= Mississippi Highway 492 =

State highway in Mississippi

Mississippi Highway 492

Route information
- Maintained by MDOT
- Length: 27.291 mi (43.921 km)
- Existed: 1950–present

Western segment
- Length: 4.312 mi (6.939 km)
- West end: MS 35 near Walnut Grove
- East end: Damascus Road near Walnut Grove

Eastern segment
- Length: 22.979 mi (36.981 km)
- West end: MS 21 / MS 487 in Sebastopol
- Major intersections: MS 15 in Union; MS 19 near House
- East end: CR 289 / CR 4300 in House

Location
- Country: United States
- State: Mississippi
- Counties: Leake, Scott, Newton, Neshoba

Highway system
- Mississippi State Highway System; Interstate; US; State
← MS 491	→ MS 493

Mississippi Highway 492 (MS 492) is a state highway in central Mississippi that consists of two separate segments. The western segment runs in the vicinity of Walnut Grove and Golden Memorial State Park. The eastern segment runs much longer and travels from Sebastopol to House, Neshoba County.

== Route description ==
The western segment of MS 492 begins just outside of the town of Walnut Grove in southern Leake County at MS 35. The road, known as Sylvanus Street, heads east and almost immediately reaches the town limits of Walnut Grove. The highway makes a sharp curve to the north where its name changes to Main Street. MS 492, traveling through the southernmost portion of the town where some businesses exist along the road, reaches an intersection with Chadwick Avenue. MS 878 continues north along Main Street here while MS 492 sharply curves to the southeast along Chadwick Avenue, passing more businesses. The road heads into a more wooded area as it passes the closed Walnut Grove Correctional Facility and exits the town limits. Crossing into Scott County, the road heads generally east along rolling hills, passing the entrance to Golden Memorial State Park. After the park entrance, state maintenance of the road ends and the road simply becomes known as Damascus Road.

Just over four miles (6.4 km) to the east of the end of the previous segment, MS 492 resumes in the town of Sebastopol at the intersection of MS 21 and MS 487. MS 492 heads southeast along Main Street mostly heading past houses. The road exits Sebastopol and Scott County by crossing into Newton County. Heading east, MS 492 travels through a mix of woods and open fields. It skirts the Neshoba County line before entering the town of Union along Jackson Road. Crossing a railroad at-grade, the state highway travels through the center of town where it passes businesses, some houses, churches, and the northern terminus of MS 489. Towards the east side of town, MS 492 crosses MS 15. It then travels in a more northeasterly direction, crossing into a rural Neshoba County. MS 492 crosses the divided MS 19 and then heads into the unincorporated community of House. It passes a store and some service stations before reaching an intersection with County Road 298 (CR 298) and CR 4300 in the community. State maintenance of the road, thus the formal end of the state highway, ends just before the intersection.

Three segments of MS 492 have formal memorial designations: Blue Star Memorial Highway within the corporate limits of Union, Robert L. Holliman Memorial Highway between Union and MS 19, and Fire Chief Mickey Lewis Yates in western Newton County.

== History ==
The first segment of MS 492 that was created was between Sebastopol and Union in 1950 along an unimproved road. The road had been fully paved by 1953. It was extended to the west to Walnut Grove (by traveling south along a portion of MS 21 from Sebastopol) and to the east to House in 1957. Between 1965 and 1967, the segment west of Sebastopol was removed from the state highway system, however a portion of it in the immediate vicinity of Walnut Grove was restored by 1977. The highway has generally remained the same since.

An extension of MS 492 further west has been proposed in Leake County since the late 1950s. It would begin at MS 487 near Tuscola and travel east through the Tuscolameta Creek valley before ending at MS 35 north of Walnut Grove. The future segment to-date remains a part of the state highway segment.

== Major intersections ==
County	Location	mi	km	Destinations	Notes
Leake		0.000	0.000	MS 35 – Harperville, Forest	Western terminus
Leake	Walnut Grove	0.445	0.716	MS 878 north (Main Street) to MS 35 north / Cole Avenue	Southern terminus of MS 878
Scott		4.312	6.939	Damascus Road	Eastern terminus of western segment
Scott	Gap in route				
Scott	Sebastopol	4.312	6.939	MS 21 / MS 487 south – Forest, Philadelphia, Standing Pine	Western terminus of eastern segment; northern terminus of MS 487
Newton	Union	18.557	29.865	MS 489 south (Main Street)	Northern terminus of MS 489
Newton	Union	19.420	31.253	MS 15 – Philadelphia, Decatur	To Laird Hospital
Neshoba		26.972	43.407	MS 19 – Philadelphia, Collinsville, Meridian	
Neshoba		27.291	43.921	CR 289 / CR 4300	Eastern terminus
1.000 mi = 1.609 km; 1.000 km = 0.621 mi
