= Mississippi Highway 21 =

State Highway in Mississippi

Mississippi Highway 21

Route information
- Maintained by MDOT
- Length: 80.3 mi (129.2 km) (73.272 mi excluding concurrencies)
- Existed: 1950–present

Major junctions
- South end: MS 35 in Forest
- MS 15 / MS 16 / MS 19 in Philadelphia
- North end: MS 39 / MS 145 / MS 397 in Shuqualak and Preston

Location
- Country: United States
- State: Mississippi
- Counties: Scott, Leake, Newton, Neshoba, Kemper, Noxubee

Highway system
- Mississippi State Highway System; Interstate; US; State
← I-20	→ I-22

Mississippi Highway 21 (MS 21) is a state highway in central Mississippi. It runs from north to south for 80.3 miles (129.2 km) and serves six counties: Scott, Leake, Newton, Neshoba, Kemper, and Noxubee.

== Route description ==
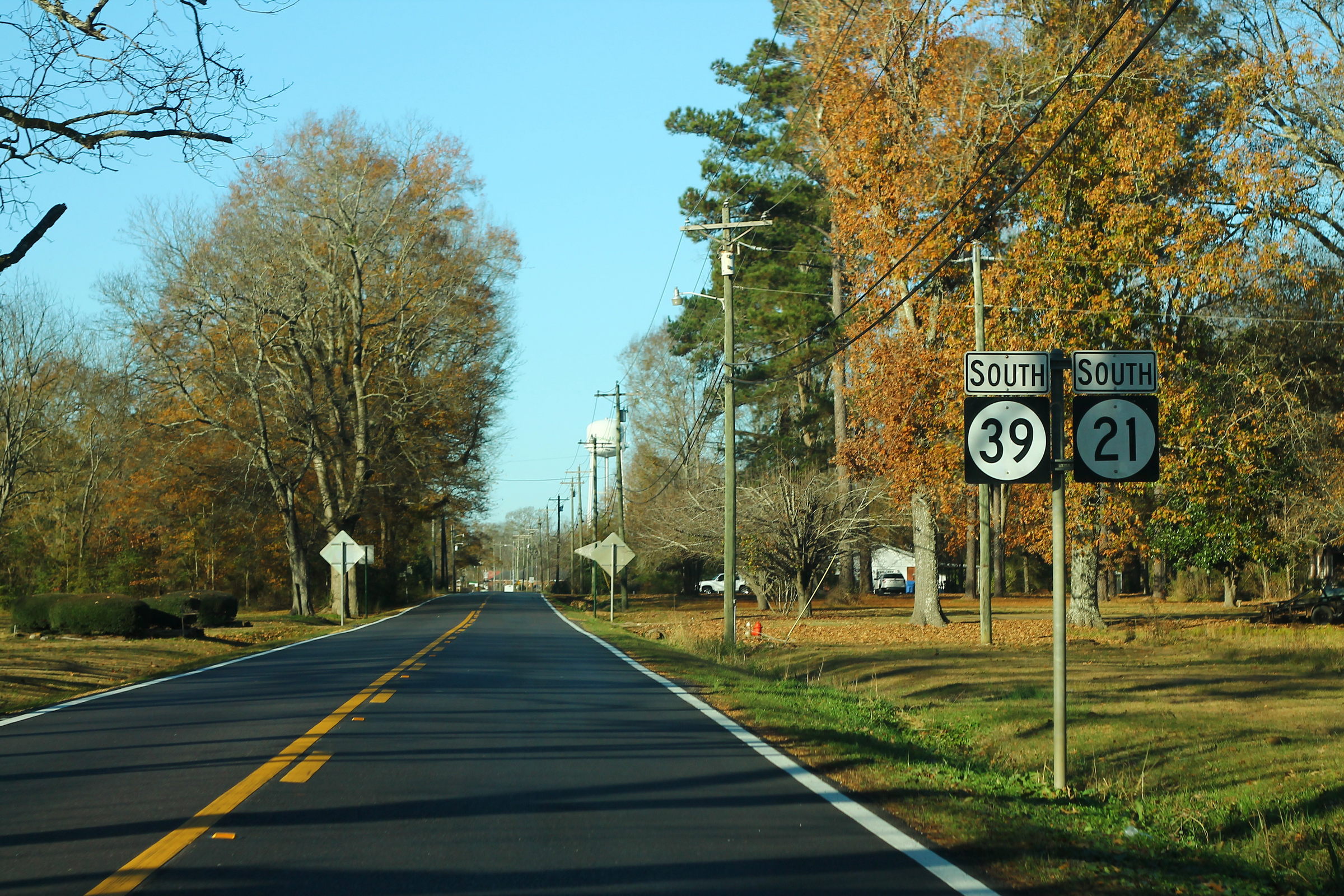
MS 21/MS 39 southbound in Shuqualak

MS 21 begins in Scott County in Forest at an intersection with MS 35 (Woodland Drive N) in the northern part of town. It heads east as two-lane highway to bypass the town along its northern outskirts for a couple of miles to have an intersection with its former alignment into downtown (Old Highway 21) before leaving Forest and curving northward. The highway winds its way north, then northeast, through mostly farmland for several miles, where it crosses Tuscolameta Creek and becomes concurrent (overlapped) with MS 492 (Damascus Road) near Golden Memorial State Park, before entering Sebastopol. MS 21/MS 492 pass by some neighborhoods and businesses before weaving its way through downtown, where MS 492 splits at an intersection with MS 487 (Main Street). MS 21 now leaves downtown and crosses into Leake County for a short distance before leaving Sebastopol and crossing into Newton County for a short distance before finally entering Neshoba County (with all this happening in less than a mile).

MS 21 heads northeast for several miles through farmland to pass through Dixon before having an intersection with MS 485 to enter a wooded area as it passes by the Neshoba County Fairgrounds and enters the Mississippi Band of Choctaw Indians Reservation. It passes through a portion of the reservation as it has an intersection with MS 488 before the reservation and entering the Philadelphia city limits. MS 21 passes through a rural portion of town before becoming concurrent with MS 15, with the two heading north as a four-lane divided highway through the Williamsville neighborhood, where they pick up MS 16, before MS 21 and MS 16 split off along MS 19 at a partial interchange. MS 16/MS 19/MS 21 have an intersection with unsigned MS 885 as they pass through a major business district before the splits into a one-way pair between Main Street and Beacon Street to pass through downtown, where MS 21 splits off onto Pecan Street just after passing by the Neshoba County Courthouse. MS 21 passes through neighborhoods as a two-lane as it turns onto Columbus Avenue before leaving Philadelphia and traveling through an even mix of farmland and woodlands for several miles, where it has an intersection with MS 491, and crosses Bogue Chitto, before passing through Coy, where it has an intersection with a county road leading to MS 393 (Road 789, provides access to Nanih Waiya) and enters Kemper County.

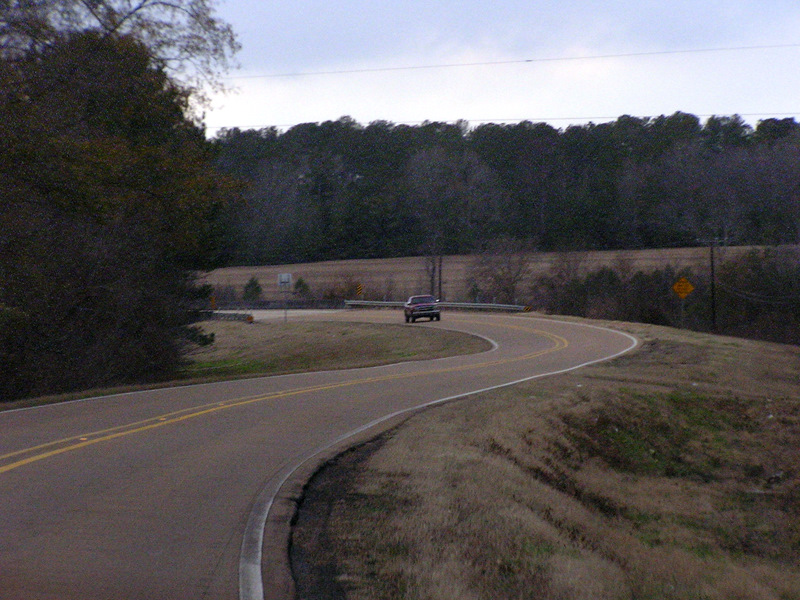
Mississippi Highway 21 southbound in northeast Neshoba County.

MS 21 travels east through farmland, then woodlands, to have an intersection with MS 397 at the Preston community before entering Noxubee County. The highway now passes northeast through rugged, hilly wooded, and remote terrain for several miles to become concurrent with MS 39 and entering Shuqualak. MS 21/MS 39 travel along Main Street as they pass through neighborhoods and downtown before coming to an intersection with MS 145, where MS 21 ends and MS 39 continues only 0.3 miles (0.48 km) west to end at an intersection with US 45.

== Major intersections ==
County	Location	mi	km	Destinations	Notes
Scott	Forest	0.0	0.0	MS 35 (Woodland Drive N) to I-20 / US 80 – Forest, Carthage	Southern terminus
Scott		15.7	25.3	MS 492 west (Damascus Road) – Walnut Grove, Golden Memorial State Park	South end of MS 492 overlap
Scott	Sebastopol	17.4	28.0	MS 487 south (Main Street) – Standing Pine MS 492 east (Main Street) – Union	Northern terminus of MS 487; east end of MS 492 overlap
Leake	No major junctions				
Newton	No major junctions				
Neshoba		29.7	47.8	MS 485 north	Southern terminus of MS 485
Neshoba	Fairview	35.6	57.3	MS 488 west – Laurel Hill, Madden	Eastern terminus of MS 488
Neshoba	Philadelphia	37.5	60.4	MS 15 south – Decatur	South end of MS 15 overlap
Neshoba	Philadelphia	37.7	60.7	MS 16 west – Carthage, Casinos	South end of MS 16 overlap
Neshoba	Philadelphia	37.9	61.0	Cooper Williams Drive - Williamsville	
Neshoba	Philadelphia	38.5	62.0	MS 15 north / MS 19 north – Kosciusko, Louisville	Interchange; north end of MS 15 overlap; south end of MS 19 overlap; no access from southbound MS 15 to MS 21 north/MS 16 east; no access from MS 21 south/MS 16 east to MS 15 north
Neshoba	Philadelphia	38.8	62.4	MS 885 north To MS 15 north / MS 19 north – Kosciusko, Louisville	Southern terminus of unsigned MS 885
Neshoba	Philadelphia	40.3	64.9	MS 16 east / MS 19 south (Main Street/Beacon Street) – De Kalb, Meridian	North end of MS 16 / MS 19 overlap
Neshoba	Philadelphia	40.6	65.3	Pecan Avenue - Louisville, Kosciusko	Former MS 15 north / MS 19 north
Neshoba		52.3	84.2	MS 491 south – Bogue Chitto	Northern terminus of MS 491
Neshoba	Coy	55.4	89.2	Road 789; To MS 393 – Nanih Waiya	
Kemper	Preston	61.2	98.5	MS 397 – Louisville, De Kalb	
Noxubee		76.1	122.5	MS 39 south – De Kalb	South end of MS 39 overlap
Noxubee	Shuqualak	80.3	129.2	MS 39 north (Main Street) to US 45 – Columbus, Meridian; MS 145 – Macon, Scooba	North end of MS 39 overlap; northern terminus
1.000 mi = 1.609 km; 1.000 km = 0.621 mi: Concurrency terminus; Incomplete access
