= Mississippi Highway 487 =

State highway in Mississippi

Mississippi Highway 487

Route information
- Maintained by MDOT and Town of Sebastopol
- Length: 25.944 mi (41.753 km)
- Existed: 1950–present

Major junctions
- South end: MS 13 in Lena
- MS 35 near Carthage
- North end: MS 21 / MS 492 in Sebastopol

Location
- Country: United States
- State: Mississippi
- Counties: Leake, Scott

Highway system
- Mississippi State Highway System; Interstate; US; State
← MS 486	→ MS 488

Mississippi Highway 487 (MS 487) is a state highway mostly within Leake County, Mississippi that travels in an arc-shape for about 26 miles (42 km). The highway is signed north–south though the overall direction runs from west to east from Lena to Sebastopol, Scott County; its purported northern terminus is lower in latitude than its southern terminus.

== Route description ==
Within the town limits of Lena, MS 487 branches off of MS 13 northeast along Grand Avenue. It heads through a mix of woods, fields, houses, and poultry farms. As it approaches the community of Tuscola, it passes an abandoned dragstrip raceway. In Tuscola, MS 487 reaches a T-intersection with MS 500 at its eastern terminus and turns to the north. The highway passes through a densely wooded area between the man-made canals of the Tuscolameta Creek. It emerges from the woods in favor of winding curves and surroundings of more open fields. MS 487 reaches MS 35 at a skewed intersection about four miles (6.4 km) southeast of Carthage. After this intersection, MS 487's heading changes to the east as it enters the census designated place of Standing Pine, part of the Choctaw reservation. Turning more towards the southeast, the highway passes through the community of Rosebud where fields mainly line the road. It curves to the south, passing through the community of Salem. Before reaching the county line, MS 487 passes a funeral home and medical clinic. At the Scott County line, state maintenance ends and the remaining 0.221 miles (0.356 km) of the highway is maintained by the town of Sebastopol, whose town limit is also at the county line. Continuing south, the road passes some houses and a small restaurant. MS 487 ends at an intersection in the town center with MS 21 and MS 492, the latter of which has a segment terminus at this intersection as well.

== History ==
The first segment of MS 487 formally designated was the section road between Lena and MS 35 in 1950. The unimproved road on which it was designated had been part of the state highway system, however, since about 1948. The highway was extended east along an unimproved road tom Sebastopol in 1957 and its alignment has generally remained since.

== Major intersections ==
County	Location	mi	km	Destinations	Notes
Leake	Lena	0.000	0.000	MS 13 (Grand Avenue / Canton Avenue)	Southern terminus
Leake	Tuscola	5.863	9.436	MS 500 west	Eastern terminus of MS 500
Leake		10.759	17.315	MS 35 – Forest, Carthage	
Scott	Sebastopol	25.944	41.753	MS 21 / MS 492 east (Main Street) – Union, Philadelphia, Forest	Northern terminus; western terminus of MS 492 segment
1.000 mi = 1.609 km; 1.000 km = 0.621 mi
