= Mississippi Highway 500 =

Highway in Mississippi

Mississippi Highway 500
- MS 500 highlighted in orange

Route information
- Maintained by MDOT
- Length: 5.798 mi (9.331 km)
- Existed: c. 1960–present

Major junctions
- West end: MS 13 in Lena
- East end: MS 487 in Tuscola

Location
- Country: United States
- State: Mississippi
- Counties: Leake

Highway system
- Mississippi State Highway System; Interstate; US; State
← MS 498	→ MS 501

Mississippi Highway 500 (MS 500) is a short state highway in central Mississippi. The route starts at MS 13 in the town of Lena, and it travels eastward across southern Leake County. The road turns northeastward after halfway to its eastern terminus, and it ends at MS 487 near Tuscola. MS 500 was designated in 1960 as a gravel road, and it was completely paved with asphalt eight years later.

== Route description ==
The route starts at a three-way junction with MS 13 in Lena, just south of MS 13's intersection with MS 487. Known as Lena and Walnut Grove Road, it travels eastward through the town. The route leaves the corporate limit of Lena past Lyle Street and enters a forested area at Ealy Road. After intersecting Storm Road, the route crosses Sweetwater Creek and begins to turn northeastward near Drystone Road. MS 500 turns north northeast of Union Ridge Road. It shifts westward slightly near Lindsey Road, and it crosses a stream that leads to a drainage ditch. The route emerges out of the forest and ends at MS 487 in Tuscola. The road continues northward as MS 487, and it travels north to MS 35 and onward to Sebastopol.

In 2016, the Mississippi Department of Transportation (MDOT) calculated as many as 670 vehicles traveling on MS 500 east of Mills Street, and as few as 580 vehicles traveling north of Dry Stone Road. The route is legally defined in Mississippi Code § 65-3-3, and is maintained by the Mississippi Department of Transportation (MDOT) as part of the state highway system.

== History ==
The designation was proposed around January 1960, helping connect Lena to MS 35. By September, MS 500 was opened as a gravel road. Paving of MS 500 was near completion in 1961, and a portion near the eastern terminus was paved by 1962. The segment near Lena was paved by 1967, and the remainder was completed one year later.

== Major intersections ==
The entire route is in Leake County.

Location	mi	km	Destinations	Notes
Lena	0.000	0.000	MS 13 (Grand Avenue)	Western terminus
Tuscola	5.798	9.331	MS 487	Eastern terminus
1.000 mi = 1.609 km; 1.000 km = 0.621 mi
