= Mississippi Highway 35 =

Highway in Mississippi

Mississippi Highway 35

Route information
- Maintained by MDOT
- Length: 274.7 mi (442.1 km) (261.323 mi excluding concurrencies)
- Existed: 1932–present

Major junctions
- South end: LA 21 at the Louisiana state line near Twin
- US 98 in Columbia; US 84 near Prentiss; US 49 in Mt. Olive; I-20 in Forest; US 80 in Forest; US 51 in Vaiden; I-55 in Vaiden; US 82 in Carrollton; US 51 in Batesville; I-55 in Batesville
- North end: MS 315 / MS 315 Scenic at Sardis Dam

Location
- Country: United States
- State: Mississippi
- Counties: Marion, Jefferson Davis, Covington, Smith, Scott, Leake, Attala, Carroll, Grenada, Tallahatchie, Panola

Highway system
- Mississippi State Highway System; Interstate; US; State
| ← MS 33 | → MS 37 |

Mississippi Highway 35 (MS 35) is a state highway in Mississippi. It runs north–south for 274.7 miles (442.1 km), beginning at the Louisiana state line and ending at a junction with MS 315 at Sardis Dam. MS 35 serves the counties of Marion, Jefferson Davis, Covington, Smith, Scott, Leake, Attala, Carroll, Grenada, Tallahatchie, and Panola.

== Route description ==
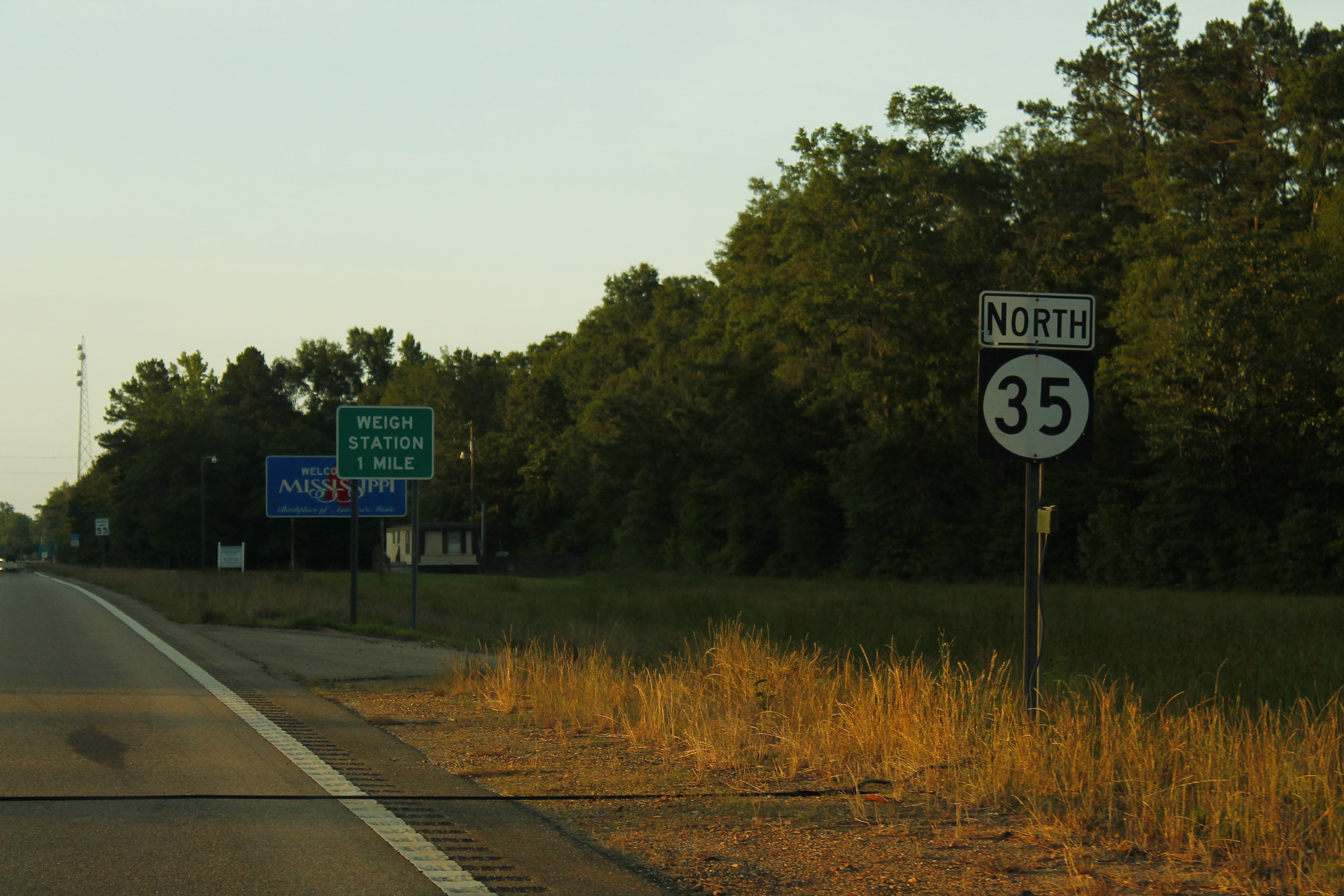
Mississippi Highway 35 northbound just past the Louisiana state line

MS 35 begins in the southern part of the state in Marion County at the Louisiana state line in the community of Twin, where it continues south as Louisiana Highway 21 (LA 21). It heads north as a two-lane highway through Twin and the community of Sandy Hook, where it has an intersection with MS 48, before paralleling the Pearl River through the communities of Pickwick, Cheraw, Natcole, and Jamestown. The highway now widens to a four-lane divided highway for a short distance before entering the community of Foxworth and becoming concurrent (overlapped) with US 98. MS 35 follows US 98 to pass just south of the main business district to have an intersection with MS 586 before splitting off and becoming concurrent with MS 13 north. MS 13/MS 35 soon narrow to two-lanes and leaves the community to cross a bridge over the Pearl River to enter the city of Columbia. The highway passes through the northern edge of town, bypassing downtown as it travels through neighborhoods and an industrial area (passing by Columbia Water Park, Mimosa Landing Campground, and the Columbia Exposition Center), before coming to an intersection with N Main Street, where MS 13 splits off and heads north while MS 35 continues northeast for several miles to leave Columbia and travel through mostly woodlands to cross into Jefferson Davis County.

MS 35 passes through the eastern part the county, traveling through a mix of farmland and wooded areas for several miles to pass through the town of Bassfield (which it mostly bypasses along its western side as it has an intersection with MS 42) before crossing into Covington County. The highway heads northeast through rural areas to cross the Bouie River and have an intersection with US 84 before entering the Mount Olive city limits. It mostly passes through neighborhoods as it bypasses downtown along its southeastern side (where it has an intersection with US 49 before leaving Mount Olive to cross Okatoma Creek and have an intersection with MS 532 before entering Smith County.

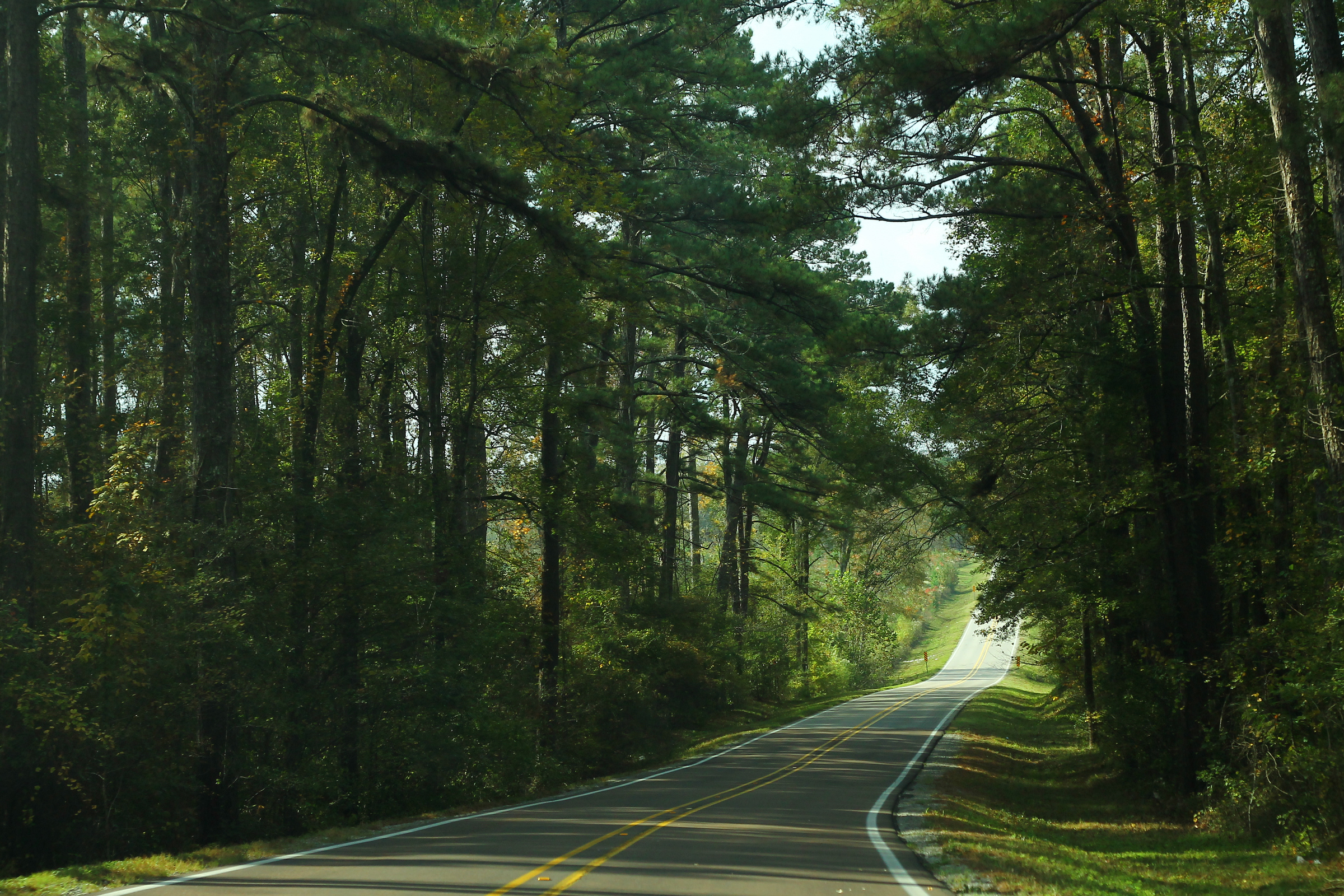
MS 35 passing through the Bienville National Forest

MS 35 travels through farmland for several miles, where it passes through the community of Zion Hill, before the town of Mize along Oak Street. It passes through neighborhoods, passing by Mize Attendance Center (K-12 School), before crossing some railroad tracks to enter downtown and becoming concurrent with MS 28 east. The highways turn east to leave Mize and pass through woodlands (where they cross Oakohay Creek) for a couple miles before MS 35 splits off and heads north through farmland to enter the town of Raleigh. MS 35 has an intersection with MS 37 just past the town's high school and its wind its way through hilly neighborhoods along Magnolia Drive for a couple miles before having an intersection with MS 540 and passing through downtown along Main Street. The highway has an intersection with MS 18 and leaves downtown to pass through some neighborhoods along Mimosa Drive for several blocks before leaving Raleigh. MS 35 travels through several patches of the Bienville National Forest, passing by the Shongelo Recreation Area, before passing through Elam and having intersections with MS 481 and MS 902.

MS 35 now enters Scott County and immediately passes through Homewood, where it has an intersection with MS 892, before entering the town of Forest at an interchange with I-20 (Exit 88). The highway widens to a four-lane divided highway here and it heads north through a business district and neighborhoods for several blocks before passing through the western edge of downtown at an intersection with US 80. It becomes an undivided highway and passes through more neighborhoods for several blocks before having an intersection with MS 21, where it leaves Forest and narrows to two-lanes. MS 35 travels through farmland for several miles, passing through the community of Harperville (where MS 882 loops through the center of town) before crossing into Leake County.

MS 35 crosses Tuscolameta Creek to enter the town of Walnut Grove, where it bypasses downtown along its west side as it has intersections with MS 492 (Sylvanus Street) and MS 878 (Main Street). The highway leaves Walnut Grove and heads northwest through farmland for several miles, where it has intersections with MS 487 and MS 488, before crossing the Pearl River into the town of Carthage. It passes through some neighborhoods before traveling through a major business district, where it has an intersection with MS 16. MS 35 now bypasses downtown along its west side and travels through neighborhoods for several blocks to have an interchange with MS 25. The highway leaves Carthage and travels through a portion of the Mississippi Band of Choctaw Indians Reservation, passing through the Redwater community, before traveling through a mix of farmland and wooded areas for several miles to enter Attala County.

MS 35 enters the community of Williamsville and becomes concurrent with MS 19 at an intersection with MS 14. MS 35/MS 19 pass along the west side of the community to have an intersection with MS 736 before crossing a bridge over the Yockanookany River to leave Williamsville and enter the Kosciusko city limits. The highway immediately has an interchange with the Natchez Trace Parkway, as well as an intersection with MS 731 (S Huntington Street), before bypassing downtown along its eastern side as a four-lane undivided highway to have an intersection with MS 735 (E Jefferson Street/Old MS 12). MS 35/MS 12 become concurrent with MS 12 west and they pass through a major business district along the northern side of town, where MS 43 joins the concurrency before MS 35 splits off as a two-lane and heads northwest to leave Kosciusko and travel through the hilly woodlands of the North Central Hills for the next several miles. MS 35 passes through the community of Hesterville, where it has an intersection with MS 440 before entering Carroll County.

MS 35 crosses the Big Black River into the town Vaiden, having an intersection with US 51 shortly thereafter as it bypasses downtown along its southern side to have a short concurrency with MS 430, where it has an interchange I-55 (Exit 174). The highway now leaves Vaiden and heads northwest through farmland, then woodlands, for the next several miles to have a short concurrency with US 82 before splitting off along MS 17 north to enter the town of Carrollton. MS 35/MS 17 travel straight through downtown along Lexington Street before crossing Big Sand Creek into the neighboring town of North Carrollton, where they pass through a neighborhood along George Street before entering downtown and coming to an intersection with Main Street, with MS 35 splitting off and turning left here while MS 17 turns right. MS 35 leaves downtown and heads through neighborhoods along Main Street before merging onto Charleston Road and winding its northwest to North Carrollton and travel through hilly and mostly wooded terrain to enter Grenada County.

MS 35 continues northwest through hilly woodlands for several miles to enter the community of Holcomb, with it bypassing downtown along its eastern and northern sides as it has an extremely short concurrency with MS 7. The highway leaves Holcomb, concurrent with MS 8 west, and they pass through mostly farmland to cross the Yalobusha River before passing through the community of Oxberry, where MS 35 splits off and heads due north to enter Tallahatchie County.

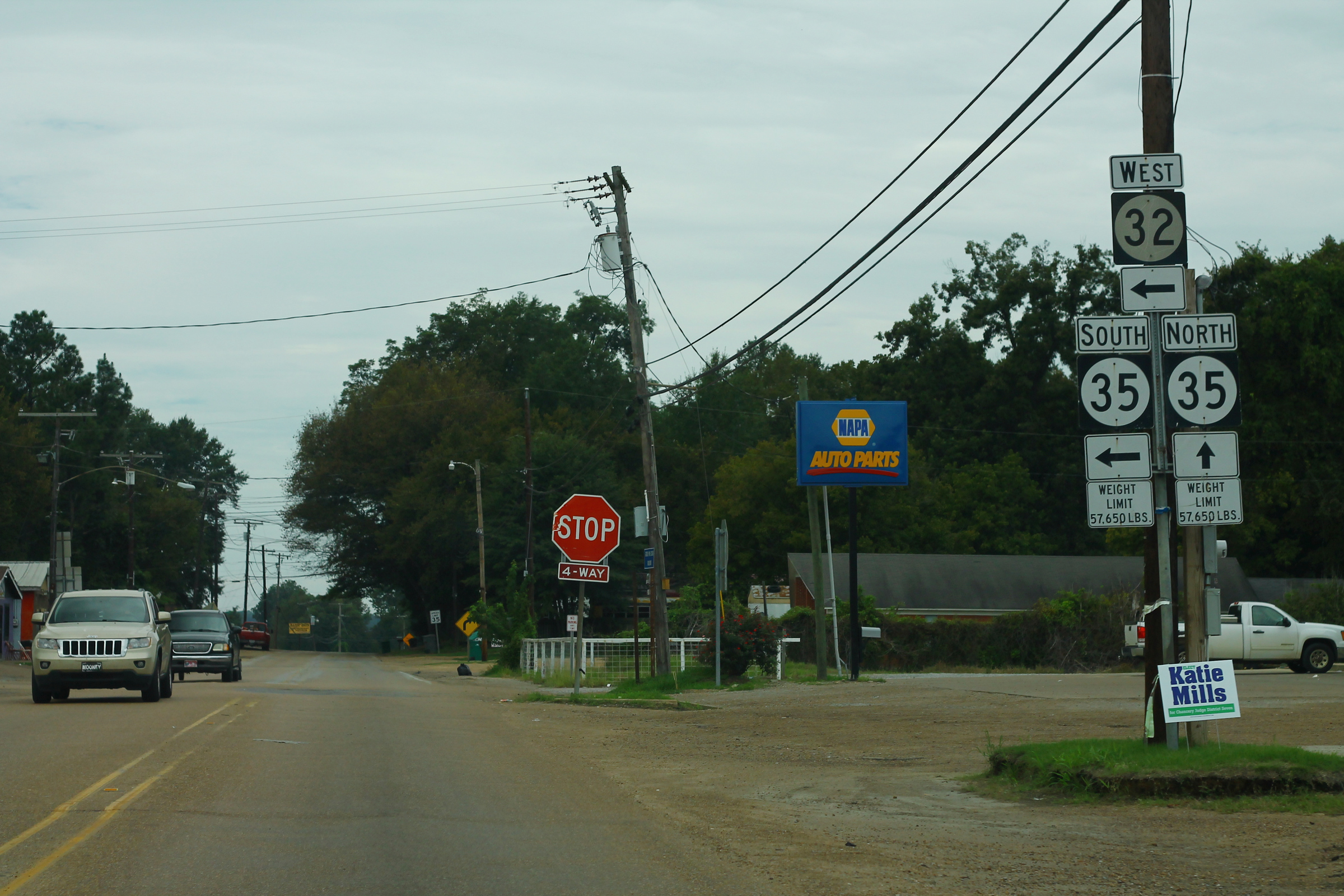
MS 35 and MS 32's intersection on the west side of downtown Charleston

MS 35 now lowers itself down some Loess bluffs to enter the Mississippi Delta region and it travels northward through flat farmland, passing through the communities of Leverett and Paynes (as well as having an intersection with MS 732 (Tallaha Road)), before becoming concurrent with MS 32 and crossing Tillatoba Creek into the town Charleston. The highway passes through some neighborhoods along Clay Street before coming to an intersection with Main Street in a business district on the west side of downtown, where MS 35 splits off and turns left to leave Charleston and pass along the eastern of the delta for several miles to enter Panola County.

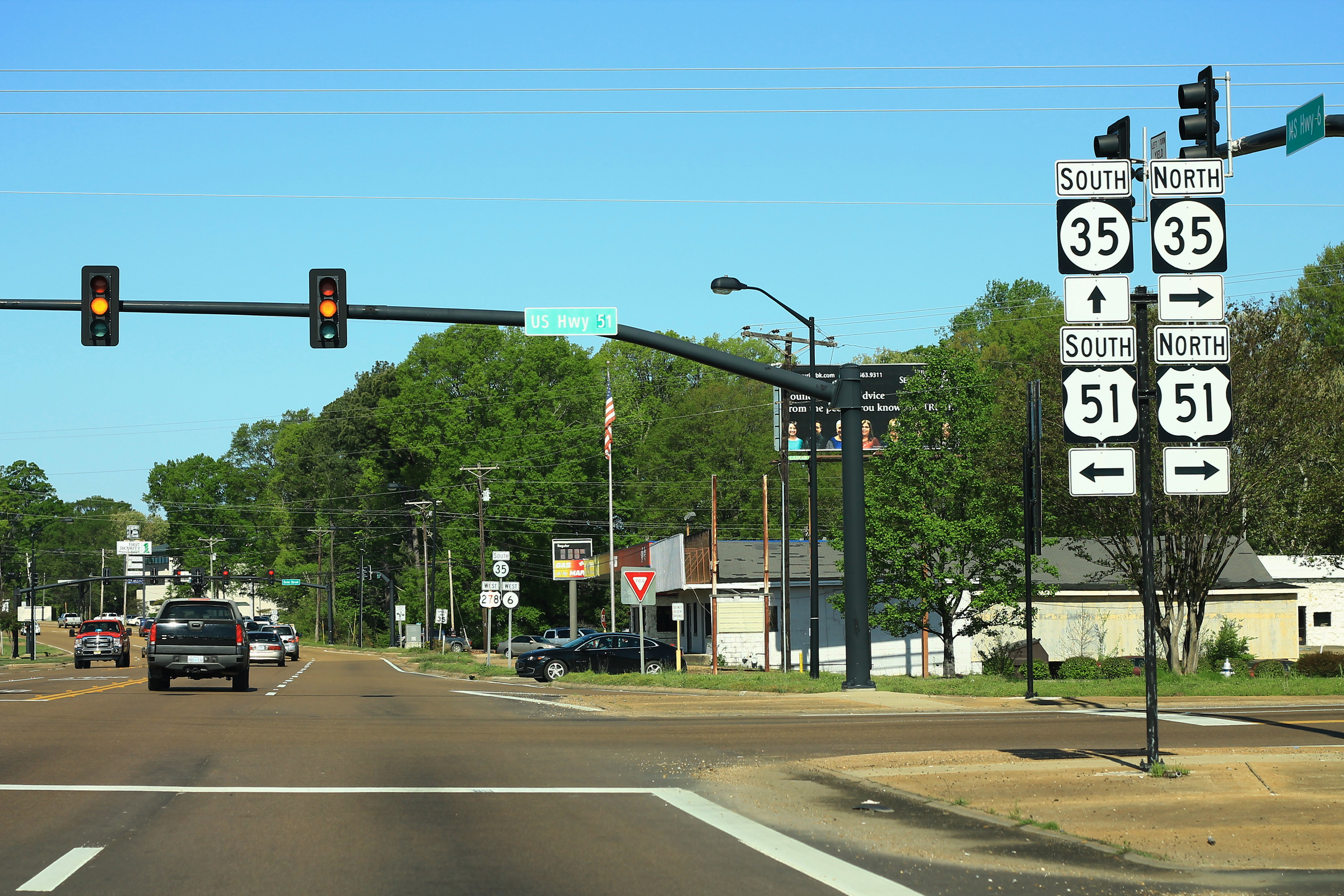
The junction of MS 6, MS 35, US 51, and US 278 in Batesville

MS 35 crosses the Yocona River has an intersection with MS 322 before climbing back up some loess bluffs out of the delta near the Tocowa community. The highway winds its way northeast through a mix of farmland and wooded areas for several miles to enter the city of Batesville, with it passing through a neighborhood before becoming concurrent with MS 6/US 278. They head east through a business district as they bypass downtown along its southern side for several blocks before widening to an undivided four-lane (at a junction with MS 725 (Eureka Street)) and coming to an intersection with US 51, with MS 35 splitting off and heading along US 51 north. US 51/MS 35 pass through a business district along the eastern side of downtown for several blocks before MS 35 turns left and splits as a two-lane along James Street (concurrent with MS 315 Scenic). MS 35/MS 315 Scenic travel through a small neighborhood before turning right onto Broadway Street to pass under US 51 and parallel a railroad through an industrial area. The highway has another interchange with I-55 (Exit 246) before leaving Batesville and heading northeast through farmland to pass by Panola County Airport and cross Hotopha Creek. MS 35/MS 315 meander up a narrow valley for a few miles to enter John W. Kyle State Park and pass along the southern shores of Lower Lake before MS 35 comes to an end at an intersection with MS 315 at the bottom of Sardis Dam, with MS 315 Scenic continuing north along MS 315 south to cross over the very top of the dam.

== History ==
=== Bridge damage ===
In 2003, the bridge in Walnut Grove was damaged by overflowing floodwaters in a river due to heavy rain and winds. Several months later, the bridge was replaced and reopened to traffic.

=== MS 35E and MS 35W ===
Mississippi Highway 35E
- Location: Collins - Taylorsville
- Existed: 1941–1950

Mississippi Highway 35W
- Location: Mount Olive - Raleigh
- Existed: 1941–1950

Between 1941 and 1950, MS 35 was split into Mississippi Highway 35E (MS 35E) and Mississippi Highway 35W (MS 35W) through Covington and Smith Counties.

A road has existed from Collins to Raleigh since 1928, with gravel layered between Collins and Taylorsville. All of the road was layered with gravel by 1932, and it became part of MS 35. By 1941, the road was renumbered to MS 35E, as a new road from Mount Olive to Raleigh was designated as MS 35W. MS 35E was also realigned onto a paved road that started at US 84 east of Collins, transitioning to a gravel road at Taylorsville. Around nine years later, MS 35E was renumbered to MS 37, and MS 35W became part of MS 35. The section of the route near Raleigh was paved by 1951, and the remaining section near Taylorsville was paved by July 1952.

=== MS 13W ===
Mississippi Highway 13W
- Location: Columbia - Louisiana state line near Sandy Hook
- Existed: 1941–1949

Mississippi Highway 13W (MS 13W) existed as a spur of MS 13 from Columbia southward to the Louisiana state line just past the community of Sandy Hook, continuing into that state as what is now Louisiana Highway 21 (LA 21). Designated in 1941, it was decommissioned and renumbered in 1949 as a southern extension of MS 35.

== Major intersections ==
| County | Location | mi | km | Destinations | Notes |
|---|---|---|---|---|---|
| Marion | Twin | 0.0 | 0.0 | LA 21 south – Bogalusa | Louisiana state line; southern terminus |
| Marion | Twin | 0.4 | 0.64 | Rankin Creek Road – Twin, John Ford Home | |
| Marion | Sandy Hook | 2.5 | 4.0 | MS 48 west – Tylertown, Sandy Hook | Eastern terminus of MS 48 |
| Marion | Foxworth | 16.2 | 26.1 | US 98 west – Tylertown, McComb | South end of US 98 overlap |
| Marion | Foxworth | 17.1 | 27.5 | MS 587 north to MS 586 – Foxworth | Southern terminus of MS 587 |
| Marion | Foxworth | 17.3 | 27.8 | US 98 east / MS 13 south – Columbia, Hattiesburg, Lumberton | North end of US 98 overlap; south end of MS 13 overlap |
| Marion | Columbia | 21.1 | 34.0 | Water Park Lane – Columbia Water Park | |
| Marion | Columbia | 21.7 | 34.9 | MS 13 north – Prentiss; N Main Street – Downtown Columbia | North end of MS 13 overlap |
| Jefferson Davis | Bassfield | 37.9 | 61.0 | MS 42 – Prentiss, Sumrall | |
| Covington | Lone Star | 47.7 | 76.8 | US 84 – Prentiss, Collins | |
| Covington | Mount Olive | 57.5 | 92.5 | US 49 – Jackson, Hattiesburg | |
| Covington | Mount Olive | 57.9 | 93.2 | MS 149 – Mount Olive | |
| Covington | | 58.8 | 94.6 | MS 532 east – Hot Coffee; 7th Street – Mount Olive | Western terminus of MS 532 |
| Smith | Mize | 68.0 | 109.4 | MS 28 west – Magee | South end of MS 28 overlap |
| Smith | | 69.3 | 111.5 | MS 28 east – Taylorsville, Laurel | North end of MS 28 overlap |
| Smith | Raleigh | 79.2 | 127.5 | MS 37 south / CR 77 south – Taylorsville | Northern terminus of MS 37 |
| Smith | Raleigh | 81.5 | 131.2 | To MS 540 – Mendenhall | |
| Smith | Raleigh | 81.9 | 131.8 | MS 18 – Puckett, Bay Springs | |
| Smith | Bienville National Forest | 86.6 | 139.4 | Shongelo Recreation Area main entrance | Access road into park |
| Smith | Elam | 88.3 | 142.1 | MS 481 north – Morton, Burns | Southern terminus of MS 481 |
| Smith | Lorena | 92.9 | 149.5 | MS 902 west – Burns | Eastern terminus of MS 902 |
| Scott | Homewood | 97.0 | 156.1 | MS 892 east | Western terminus of MS 892 |
| Scott | Forest | 103.7– 104.0 | 166.9– 167.4 | I-20 – Jackson, Meridian | I-20 exit 88 |
| Scott | Forest | 105.8 | 170.3 | US 80 – Morton, Newton, Downtown Forest | |
| Scott | Forest | 107.0 | 172.2 | MS 21 north – Philadelphia | Southern terminus of MS 21 |
| Scott | | 111.9 | 180.1 | Old Jackson Road - Hillsboro | |
| Scott | Harperville | 114.7 | 184.6 | MS 882 east (Midway Odom Road) | Western terminus of MS 882 |
| Scott | Harperville | 114.9 | 184.9 | MS 882 west (Old Hillsboro Road) | Eastern terminus of MS 882 |
| Leake | Walnut Grove | 121.5 | 195.5 | MS 492 east (Sylvanus Street) – Downtown Walnut Grove, Golden Memorial State Park | Western terminus of MS 492 |
| Leake | Walnut Grove | 122.6 | 197.3 | MS 878 east (Main Street) – Downtown Walnut Grove, Golden Memorial State Park | Western terminus of MS 878 |
| Leake | | 128.7 | 207.1 | MS 487 – Tuscola, Sebastopol | |
| Leake | | 130.3 | 209.7 | MS 488 east – Freeny, Madden | Western terminus of MS 488 |
| Leake | Carthage | 132.4 | 213.1 | MS 16 – Canton, Philadelphia | |
| Leake | Carthage | 133.5 | 214.8 | To MS 429 – Thomastown | |
| Leake | Carthage | 134.9– 135.2 | 217.1– 217.6 | MS 25 – Jackson, Louisville | Interchange |
| Attala | Williamsville | 152.9 | 246.1 | MS 14 / MS 19 south – Louisville, Philadelphia, Goodman | South end of MS 19 overlap |
| Attala | Williamsville | 153.5 | 247.0 | MS 736 east – Williamsville | Western terminus of MS 736 |
| Attala | | 153.8– 154.0 | 247.5– 247.8 | Natchez Trace Parkway | Interchange |
| Attala | Kosciusko | 154.0 | 247.8 | MS 731 north (S Huntington Street) – Downtown | Southern terminus of MS 731 |
| Attala | Kosciusko | 155.9 | 250.9 | MS 735 (E Jefferson Street/Old MS 12) – Downtown | |
| Attala | Kosciusko | 156.4 | 251.7 | MS 12 east – Ackerman | South end of MS 12 overlap |
| Attala | Kosciusko | 156.9 | 252.5 | MS 43 north (North Natchez Street) | South end of MS 43 overlap |
| Attala | Kosciusko | 157.1 | 252.8 | MS 12 west / MS 43 south / North Jackson Street – Durant, Kosciusko | North end of MS 12 / MS 43 overlap |
| Attala | Kosciusko | 157.2 | 253.0 | MS 19 north – West | North end of MS 19 overlap |
| Attala | Hesterville | 164.7 | 265.1 | MS 440 west – West | Eastern terminus of MS 440 |
| Carroll | Vaiden | 178.4 | 287.1 | US 51 – Durant, Jackson, Vaiden | |
| Carroll | Vaiden | 180.1 | 289.8 | MS 430 east – Vaiden | South end of MS 430 overlap |
| Carroll | Vaiden | 180.7– 180.8 | 290.8– 291.0 | I-55 – Jackson, Grenada | I-55 exit 174 |
| Carroll | Vaiden | 181.2 | 291.6 | MS 430 west – Blackhawk | North end of MS 430 overlap |
| Carroll | | 194.3 | 312.7 | US 82 east – Winona | South end of US 82 overlap |
| Carroll | Carrollton | 195.8 | 315.1 | US 82 west / MS 17 south – Greenwood, Lexington | North end of US 82 overlap; south end of MS 17 overlap |
| Carroll | North Carrollton | 197.3 | 317.5 | MS 17 north | North end of MS 17 overlap |
| Grenada | Holcomb | 217.6 | 350.2 | MS 7 north / MS 8 east – Grenada | South end of MS 7 / MS 8 overlap |
| Grenada | Holcomb | 217.7 | 350.4 | MS 7 south – Greenwood | North end of MS 7 overlap |
| Grenada | Oxberry | 221.5 | 356.5 | MS 8 west – Minter City, Cleveland | North end of MS 8 overlap |
| Tallahatchie | | 228.1 | 367.1 | Cascilla Road – Cascilla | Former MS 326 |
| Tallahatchie | Leverett | 228.7 | 368.1 | Leverett Lane – Leverett | |
| Tallahatchie | | 235.6 | 379.2 | MS 732 east (Tallaha Road) – Murphreesboro, Camp Lakeside | Western terminus of MS 732 |
| Tallahatchie | | 235.9 | 379.6 | MS 32 west – Webb | South end of MS 32 overlap |
| Tallahatchie | Charleston | 237.5 | 382.2 | MS 32 east – Oakland | North end of MS 32 overlap |
| Panola | | 249.6 | 401.7 | MS 322 west – Crowder | Eastern terminus of MS 322 |
| Panola | | 250.5 | 403.1 | Jeff Sanders Road – Tacowa | |
| Panola | Batesville | 262.0 | 421.6 | US 278 west / MS 6 west – Clarksdale | South end of US 278 / MS 6 overlap |
| Panola | Batesville | 262.7 | 422.8 | MS 725 north (Eureka Street) – Downtown Batesville | Southern terminus of MS 725 |
| Panola | Batesville | 263.0 | 423.3 | US 51 south / US 278 east / MS 6 east to I-55 – Memphis, Oxford, Grenada | North end of US 278 / MS 6 overlap; south end of US 51 overlap |
| Panola | Batesville | 263.8 | 424.5 | US 51 north MS 315 Scenic begins | North end of US 51 overlap; southern terminus of MS 315 Scenic; south end of MS 315 Scenic overlap |
| Panola | Batesville | 264.1 | 425.0 | Broadway Street - Downtown Batesville | |
| Panola | Batesville | 266.7– 266.8 | 429.2– 429.4 | I-55 – Memphis, Grenada | I-55 exit 246 |
| Panola | John W. Kyle State Park | 274.7 | 442.1 | MS 315 / MS 315 Scenic north | Northern terminus; northern end of MS 315 Scenic overlap |
1.000 mi = 1.609 km; 1.000 km = 0.621 mi: Concurrency terminus
