= Mississippi Highway 488 =

State highway in Mississippi

Mississippi Highway 488

Route information
- Maintained by MDOT
- Length: 25.561 mi (41.136 km)
- Existed: 1953–present

Major junctions
- West end: MS 35 near Carthage
- East end: MS 21 in Pearl River

Location
- Country: United States
- State: Mississippi
- Counties: Leake, Neshoba

Highway system
- Mississippi State Highway System; Interstate; US; State
| ← MS 487 | → MS 489 |

Mississippi Highway 488 (MS 488) is a state highway in rural central Mississippi. The highway travels for about 25.5 miles (41.0 km) in Leake and Neshoba counties.

== Route description ==
MS 488 begins at an intersection with MS 35 south of Carthage, Leake County and the Pearl River. The highway heads east through a mix of open fields and woods though two and a half miles (4.0 km) into the trip, the road reaches a small settlement named Freeny where some houses and churches surround the main intersection. It crosses Standing Pine Creek and curves to the southeast at Galillee Road. It then travels through the community of Free Trade where several churches are located in the area. MS 488 also intersects the unsigned MS 502 at Callahan Road. The road eventually curves more to the east where in a clearing, MS 488 reaches the western terminus of the unsigned MS 484 at Risher Road and Gunter Road. MS 488 enters the community of Madden where at an intersection with Dr. Brantley Road, the state highway turns to the north briefly. 1,000 feet (0.30 km) later, MS 488 reaches Thaggard Road, the eastern end of MS 502, and curves to the northeast, in front of Leake Academy. It heads through wooded lands and crosses into Neshoba County before turning to the north. At Laurel Hill, MS 488 turns to the east at an intersection where MS 484 has its eastern terminus and MS 427 has its southern terminus. Continuing east through fields and woods, the highway passes through the communities of Waldo and Hope before entering the formal limits of the census-designated place of Pearl River, part of the Choctaw reservation. In the community of Fairview, MS 488 ends at a Y intersection with MS 21, about three miles (4.8 km) west of Philadelphia.

== History ==
MS 488 was formally designated in 1953, though the portion of the road from Madden towards Philadelphia had been part of the state highway system since 1951. Since then, the highway's alignment had generally remained unchanged with only paving of the full length of the road occurring since then.

== Major intersections ==
| County | Location | mi | km | Destinations | Notes |
|---|---|---|---|---|---|
| Leake | | 0.000 | 0.000 | MS 35 – Forest, Carthage | Western terminus |
| Leake | Free Trade | 8.179 | 13.163 | MS 502 east (Callahan Road) | Western terminus of MS 502 |
| Leake | | 10.230 | 16.464 | MS 484 east (Risher Road) / Gunter Road | Western terminus of MS 484 |
| Leake | Madden | 12.630 | 20.326 | MS 502 west (Thaggard Road) | Eastern terminus of MS 502 |
| Neshoba | Laurel Hill | 16.962 | 27.298 | MS 427 north / MS 484 west (Laurel Hill Road) – Edinburg, Carthage | Southern terminus of MS 427, eastern terminus of MS 484 |
| Neshoba | Pearl River | 25.561 | 41.136 | MS 21 – Philadelphia, Sebastopol, Forest | Eastern terminus |
1.000 mi = 1.609 km; 1.000 km = 0.621 mi
