= Mississippi Highway 489 =

Highway in Mississippi

Mississippi Highway 489
- MS 489 highlighted in red

Route information
- Maintained by MDOT
- Length: 22.215 mi (35.752 km)
- Existed: 1956–present

Major junctions
- South end: US 80 in Lake
- North end: MS 492 in Union

Location
- Country: United States
- State: Mississippi
- Counties: Scott, Newton

Highway system
- Mississippi State Highway System; Interstate; US; State
← MS 488	→ MS 490

Mississippi Highway 489 (MS 489) is a state highway that runs for 22.215 miles (35.752 km) in the eastern part of the US state of Mississippi. The route's south end begins at U.S. Route 80 (US 80) in the Scott County portion of Lake. It almost immediately crosses into Newton County and runs to Conehatta. Following this, MS 489 continues northeast to its terminus at MS 492 in Union. The route, which is also partially designated as the Jason Boyd Memorial Highway, was first established in 1956, and it became fully paved in 1965.

== Route description ==
Traffic volume on Mississippi Highway 489
Location	Volume
East of School Street	2,000
North of Campground Road	1,400
South of Brewer McMullan Road	970
North of Gibson Road	1,200
North of Martin Luther King Drive	1,100
East of Bank Street	1,200
Volume: Annual average daily traffic; Source: Mississippi Department of Transportation

The southern terminus of MS 489 lies near the eastern edge of Scott County at an intersection with US 80, near Lake High School. From here, the road runs northeast for roughly 1,000 feet (300 m) before crossing into Newton County and curving north-northeast. Much of the following part of the highway is filled with large, open pastures, until the route enters a forested section about four miles (6.4 km) later. The route passes over a series of creeks, including Tuscolameta Creek and Conehatta Creek, over the next mile (1.6 km). Then, the route turns north at an intersection with Newton Conehatta Road, continuing for about three miles (4.8 km) to Conehatta.

In Conehatta, MS 489 bends to the right and continues northeast for another 13 miles (21 km) towards Union. About two miles (3.2 km) from the bend, the highway gains its designation as the Jason Boyd Memorial Highway, which it retains for the next mile. Later, the road crosses over Conehatta Creek again and passes a mix of landscapes and geographic features, including Stamper Pond. Approaching Union, the road becomes Conehatta Road and continues north. It eventually reaches a T-intersection, where the highway turns east on Gum Street, later designated as Main Street, in Union. MS 489 runs for approximately 0.35 miles (0.56 km) in this commercial section and intersects McRaven Street, just before terminating and yielding onto MS 492.

Mississippi Highway 489 is legally designated as a state highway in Mississippi Code § 65-3-3.

== History ==
MS 489 first appeared on Mississippi state highway maps in 1956, serving as a connector between US 80 and MS 492. Previously, only MS 21 and MS 15 had connected these two roads, each intersecting US 80 about ten miles (16 km) from Lake. Most of the middle section of MS 489 was unpaved until 1957, at which point only a small gravel section on the northern half of the highway remained. It was not until several years later, in 1965, that the road appeared fully paved on highway maps.

In 2021, a mile-long stretch of MS 489 within Conehatta was designated as the Jason Boyd Memorial Highway, in memory of Mississippi Department of Transportation superintendent Jason Boyd, who was killed two years earlier while removing debris from the highway.

On August 24, 2022, a short section of the highway near Conehatta was completely washed away as a result of major flooding in the area, causing the roadway to be closed. After repairs that involved replacing the roadway, MS 489 reopened a few days later on August 26.

== Major intersections ==
County	Location	mi	km	Destinations	Notes
Scott	Lake	0.000	0.000	US 80 / Church Street – Newton, Forest	Southern terminus
Newton	Union	22.215	35.752	MS 492 (East Jackson Road)	Northern terminus
1.000 mi = 1.609 km; 1.000 km = 0.621 mi
