= Mississippi Highway 13 =

Highway in Mississippi

Mississippi Highway 13

Route information
- Maintained by MDOT
- Length: 160.1 mi (257.7 km) (151.148 mi excluding concurrencies)
- Existed: 1932–present

Major junctions
- South end: US 49 just south of Maxie
- I-59 in Lumberton; US 11 in Lumberton; US 98 in Columbia; US 84 in Prentiss; US 49 in Mendenhall; I-20 in Morton; US 80 in Morton
- North end: MS 25 near Carthage

Location
- Country: United States
- State: Mississippi
- Counties: Forrest, Pearl River, Lamar, Marion, Jefferson Davis, Simpson, Rankin, Smith, Scott, Leake

Highway system
- Mississippi State Highway System; Interstate; US; State
← MS 12	→ MS 14

Mississippi Highway 13 (MS 13) is a state highway in Mississippi. It runs from north to south for 160.1 miles (257.7 km), serving the counties of Forrest, Pearl River, Lamar, Marion, Jefferson Davis, Simpson, Rankin, Smith, Scott, and Leake.

== Route description ==
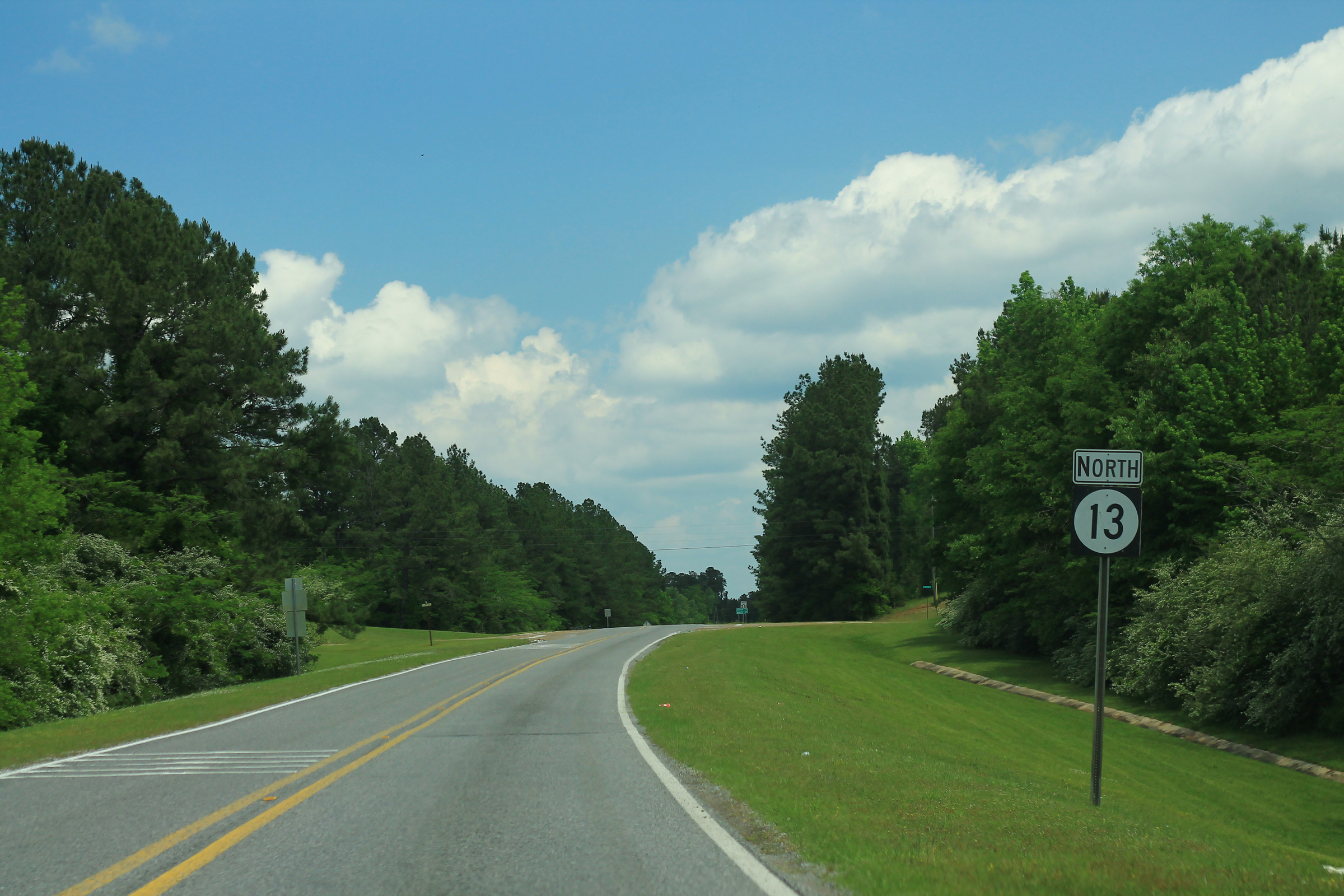
Northbound MS 13 near Morton

MS 13 begins in southern Forrest County at an intersection with US 49 just south of Maxie. It heads west as a two-lane highway through farmland, then wooded areas, for several miles, where it passes through Carnes. The highway now crosses into Pearl River County.

MS 13 continues traveling westward through rural areas, where it passes through Young and has an interchange with I-59 (Exit 41), before crossing into Lamar County and immediately entering Lumberton. The highway widens to a four-lane divided highway as it passes straight through the center of town along Main Avenue, having an intersection with US 11 directly in the center of downtown. MS 13 now narrows back to two-lanes and leaves Lumberton, passing by the city's airport and through the community of Wells Town. The highway winds its way northwest through mostly wooded areas for the next several miles, passing through Baxterville before crossing into Marion County.

MS 13 passes through woodlands for more miles before curving more northward at an intersection with MS 43 and starts paralleling the Pearl River. The highway now enters the Columbia city limits and passes by a few businesses and homes before having an intersection and becoming concurrent (overlapped) with US 98 just south of downtown, with the road continuing into downtown as Lumberton Road. They head west as a four-lane divided highway through a business district to have an intersection with MS 198 before crossing the Pearl River to leave Columbia and enter neighboring Foxworth. MS 13 splits off of US 98 and heads north along MS 35 to bypass downtown as a two-lane along its eastern side before leaving Foxworth and crossing another bridge over the river back into Columbia. MS 13/MS 35 pass through mostly neighborhoods for a few miles before MS 13 splits off to leave Columbia for the final time and head north. MS 13 travels through mostly woodlands for the next several miles to pass through Goss, where it has an intersection with MS 44, before crossing into Jefferson Davis County.

MS 13 passes through Society Hill, where it has another intersection with MS 43, before pulling away from the Pearl River and passing through mostly remote woodlands for several more miles to enter Prentiss, where it passes by a few homes and businesses before coming to an intersection and becoming concurrent with MS 184. MS 13/MS 184 bypass downtown along US 84's original bypass of the town, first passing through a business district as a four-lane divided Highway (where it has an intersection with MS 42), then as a two-lane through more rural areas (where MS 184 splits off). MS 13 heads north to have an interchange with US 84's new bypass of Prentiss before leaving the town and traveling northward through an even mix of rural farmland and wooded areas for several miles to cross into Simpson County.

MS 13 travels through rural areas for several miles, having intersections with MS 28 and yet another one with MS 43, before passing through Mendenhall, where it has interchanges with MS 149 (unsigned MS 540) and US 49 as it bypasses downtown along its west side. The highway now leaves Mendenhall and travels through rural areas, where it crosses the Strong River, before entering Rankin County.

MS 13 travels through the southeastern most corner of the county, passing through Puckett (where it has an intersection with MS 18), before entering Smith County. The highway winds its way northeast as it passes through Daniel (where it has an intersection with MS 541) and Polkville before entering Scott County.

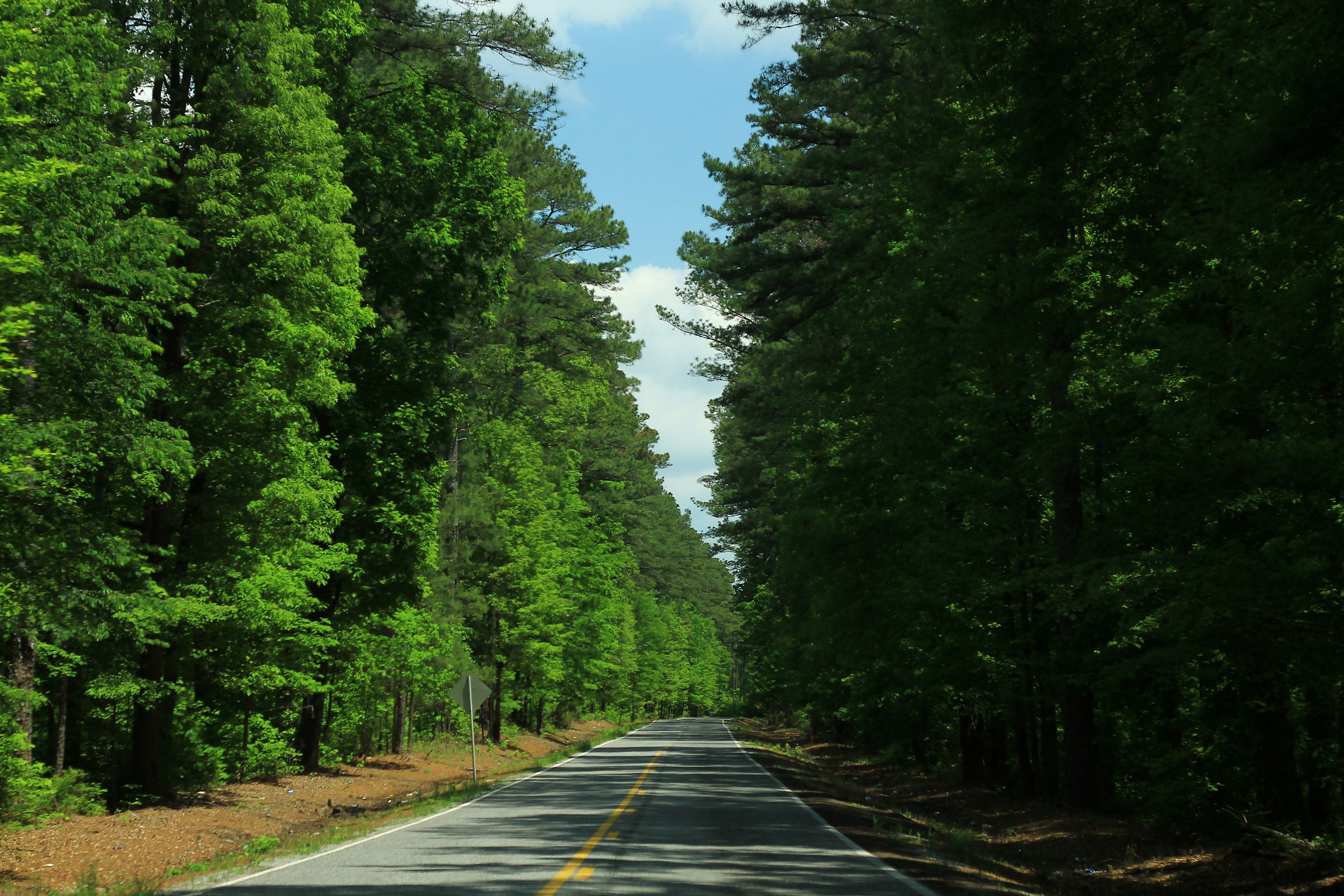
Mississippi Highway 13 passing through a portion of the Bienville National Forest

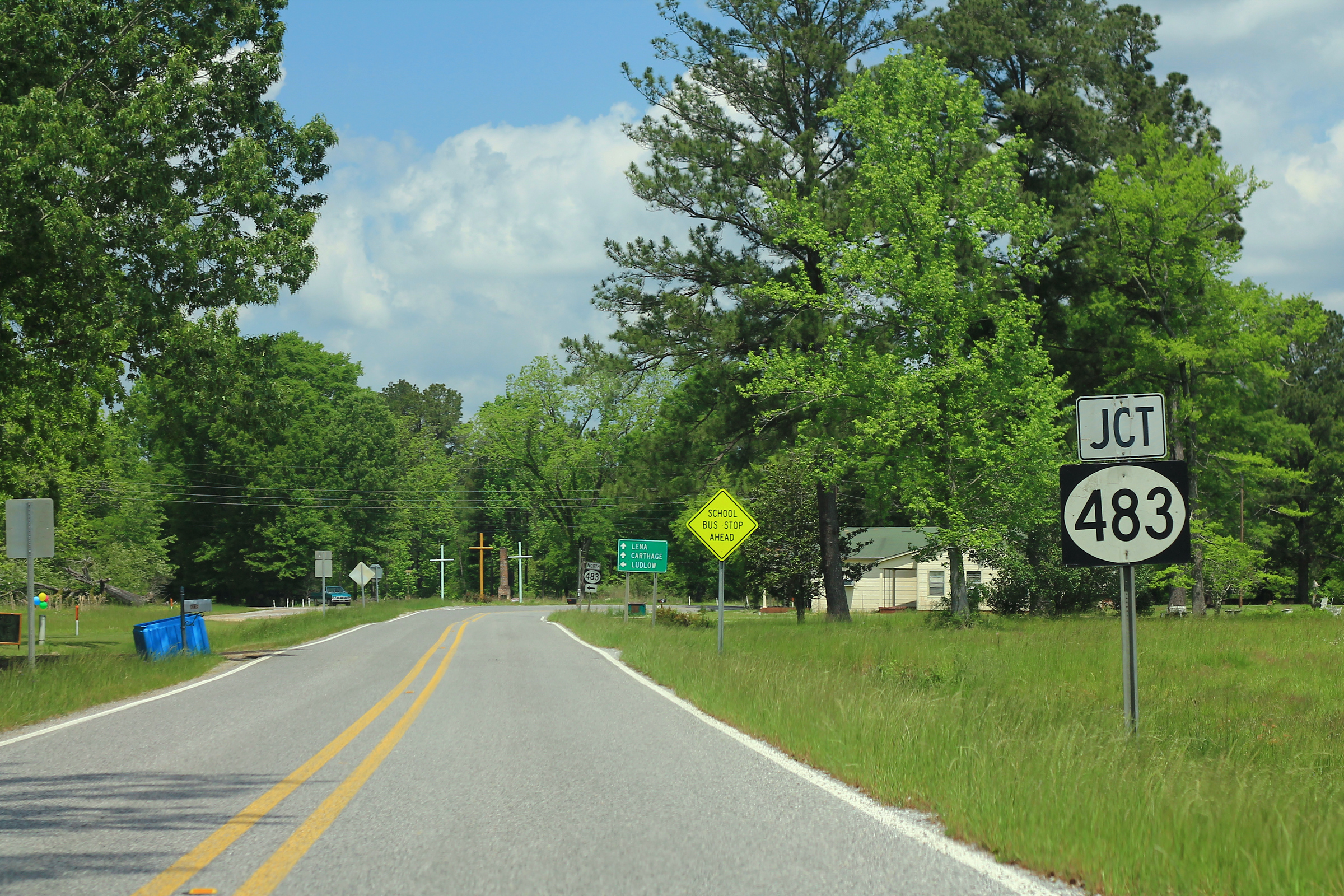
MS 13 north near its intersection with MS 483 in Forkville

MS 13 heads north through wooded areas (part of the Bienville National Forest) for several miles, where it passes through Kracker Station, before having an interchange with I-20 (Exit 77) and entering Morton. The highway passes through mostly neighborhoods, passing by Roosevelt State Park, and having an intersection with US 80 and a short concurrency with MS 481 on the west side of downtown. MS 13 now leaves Morton and passes through remote woodlands for the next several miles, with the only sign of civilization being the small community of Forkville, where it has an intersection with MS 483. It now crosses into Leake County.

MS 13 travels through farmland as it passes through Lena, where it has intersections with MS 500 and MS 487, before continuing through rural to come to an end at an intersection with MS 25 just southwest of Carthage, back along the banks of the Pearl River.

== History ==
=== MS 13W ===
Mississippi Highway 13W
- Location: Columbia - Louisiana state line near Sandy Hook
- Existed: 1941–1949

MS 13 was originally designated in 1932. It had at one time, designated in 1941, a spur route, Mississippi Highway 13W (MS 13W), which represented what is now MS 35 south of Columbia. It eventually became renumbered as a southern extension of MS 35.

=== Columbia rerouting ===
MS 13 did not originally bypass downtown Columbia as it does today. It originally entered the city from the south as Lumberton Road before becoming concurrent with MS 198/MS 35 (S High School Avenue; then part of US 98). They headed north along High School Avenue past some businesses and neighborhoods before coming to an intersection with Broad Street. MS 198 heads east (right) along Broad Street while MS 13/MS 35 headed west (left) along Broad Street to enter downtown. MS 13/MS 35 now curved northward (right) onto Main Street at the Marion County Courthouse and then passed through the downtown area. The highway then left downtown and passed through neighborhoods, where MS 35 had split off (right) onto W Lafayette Street (then Martin Luther King Jr. Drive), and continued north on Main Street through an industrial area before leaving Columbia and heading north towards Prentiss. This entire alignment was composed of two-lane streets and never crossed a bridge over the Pearl River.

== Major intersections ==
County	Location	mi	km	Destinations	Notes
Forrest		0.0	0.0	US 49 – Hattiesburg, Wiggins	Southern terminus
Pearl River	Lumberton	15.0– 15.1	24.1– 24.3	I-59 – New Orleans, Hattiesburg	I-59 exit 41
Lamar	Lumberton	17.1	27.5	US 11 – Poplarville, Hattiesburg, Little Black Creek Water Park	
Marion		39.8	64.1	MS 43 south – Picayune	Northern terminus of MS 43
Marion	Columbia	– 47.1	– 75.8	US 98 east – Hattiesburg, Downtown Columbia	South end of US 98 overlap
Marion	Columbia	49.4	79.5	MS 198 east – Columbia	Western terminus of MS 198
Marion	Foxworth	51.1	82.2	US 98 west / MS 35 south – Bogalusa, Tylertown, McComb	North end of US 98 overlap; south end of MS 35 overlap
Marion		53.8	86.6	MS 35 north – Mount Olive, Columbia	North end of MS 35 overlap
Marion	Goss	60.1	96.7	MS 44 west	Eastern terminus of MS 44; 2010 bridge over Pearl River
Jefferson Davis		64.7	104.1	MS 43 north – Oakvale, Arm	Southern terminus of MS 43
Jefferson Davis	Prentiss	75.7	121.8	MS 184 west (MS 937) – Monticello	South end of MS 184 overlap
Jefferson Davis	Prentiss	76.0	122.3	MS 42 – Bassfield	
Jefferson Davis	Prentiss	77.8	125.2	MS 184 east	North end of MS 184 overlap
Jefferson Davis		78.0– 78.3	125.5– 126.0	US 84 – Monticello, Collins	Interchange
Simpson		92.6	149.0	MS 28 – Pinola, Magee	
Simpson	Mendenhall	102.1	164.3	MS 43 south – Pinola, New Hebron	Northern terminus of MS 43
Simpson	Mendenhall	102.7– 102.8	165.3– 165.4	MS 149 (MS 540) – D'Lo, Mendenhall, D'Lo Water Park	Interchange
Simpson	Mendenhall	103.9– 104.0	167.2– 167.4	US 49 – Jackson, Hattiesburg	Interchange
Rankin	Puckett	113.0	181.9	MS 18 – Brandon, Raleigh	
Smith	Daniel	118.1	190.1	MS 541 south – White Oak	Northern terminus of MS 541
Scott	Morton	132.4– 132.6	213.1– 213.4	I-20 – Jackson, Meridian	I-20 exit 77
Scott	Morton	133.1	214.2	Roosevelt State Park (MS 888 west)	Eastern terminus of unsigned MS 888
Scott	Morton	135.3	217.7	US 80 / MS 481 south – Morton	South end of MS 481 overlap
Scott	Morton	135.9	218.7	MS 481 north – Ross Barnett Reservoir	North end of MS 481 overlap
Scott	Forkville	143.5	230.9	MS 483 north – Ludlow	Southern terminus of MS 483
Leake	Lena	153.7	247.4	MS 500 east – Tuscola	Western terminus of MS 500
Leake	Lena	153.9	247.7	MS 487 north	Southern terminus of MS 487
Leake		160.1	257.7	MS 25 – Jackson, Carthage	Northern terminus
1.000 mi = 1.609 km; 1.000 km = 0.621 mi: Concurrency terminus
