= Mississippi Highway 483 =

Highway in Mississippi

Mississippi Highway 483

Route information
- Maintained by MDOT
- Length: 9.0 mi (14.5 km)

Major junctions
- South end: MS 13 in Forkville
- North end: Utah Road in Ludlow

Location
- Country: United States
- State: Mississippi
- Counties: Scott

Highway system
- Mississippi State Highway System; Interstate; US; State
← MS 482	→ MS 484

Mississippi Highway 483 (MS 483) is a highway in Central Mississippi. The southern terminus is at MS 13 in Forkville. The northern terminus is at Utah Road in Ludlow.

== Route description ==
MS 483's southern terminus is at MS 13 in Forkville. It travels 9 miles north and its northern terminus is at Utah Road in Ludlow.

== Major intersections ==
The entire route is in Scott County.

Location	mi	km	Destinations	Notes
Forkville	0.00	0.00	MS 13 – Morton, Lena	Southern terminus
Ludlow	9.00	14.48	Utah Road; To MS 25 – Carthage, Jackson	Northern terminus
1.000 mi = 1.609 km; 1.000 km = 0.621 mi
