= Good Hope, Leake County, Mississippi =

Good Hope, Mississippi
- Unincorporated community
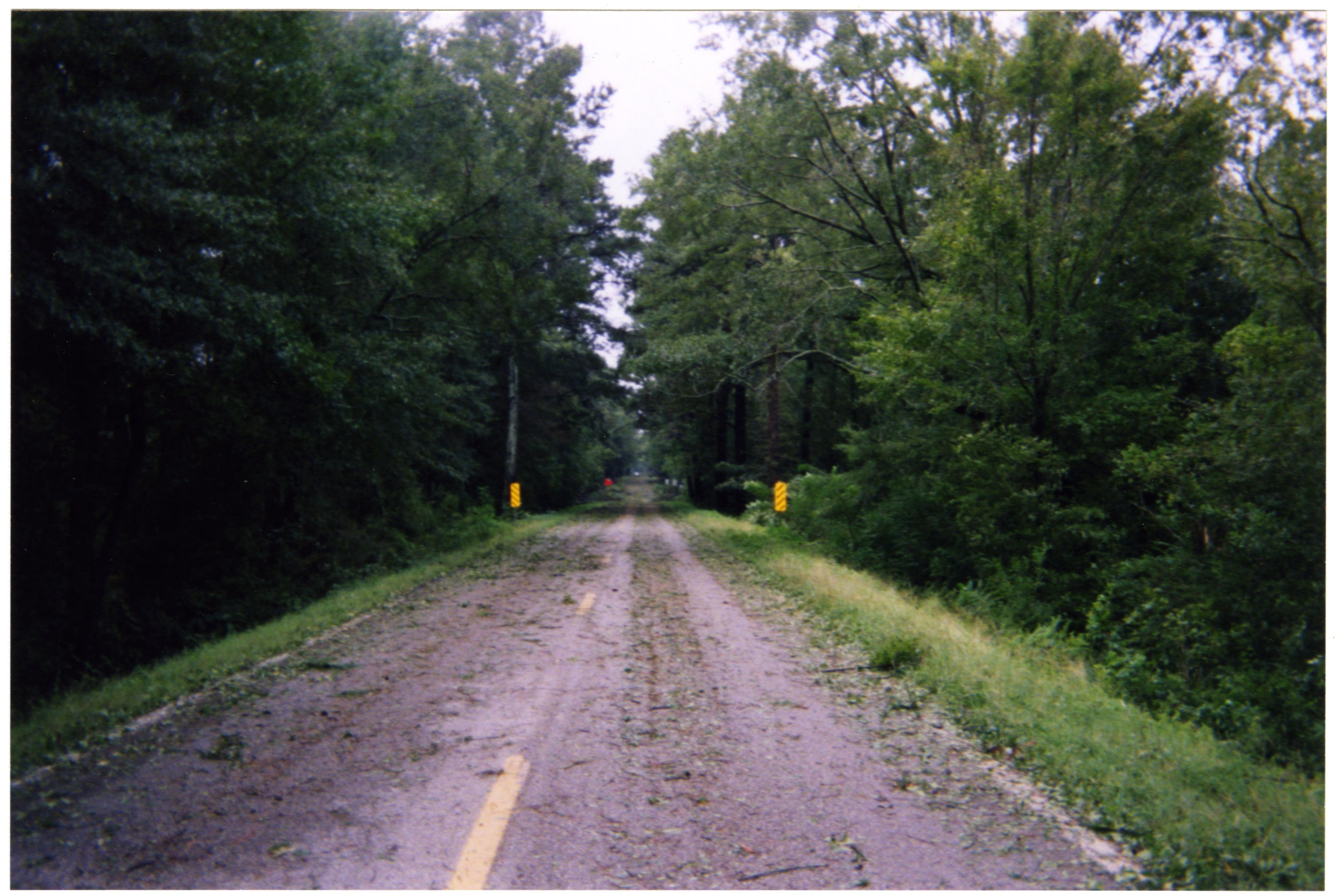

- Location within Mississippi Location within the United States
- Coordinates: 32°37′41″N 89°37′44″W
- Country: United States
- State: Mississippi
- County: Leake
- Elevation: 374 ft (114 m)
- Time zone: UTC-6 (Central (CST))
  - Summer (DST): UTC-5 (CDT)
- Area codes: 601 & 769
- GNIS feature ID: 670461

Good Hope is an unincorporated community in Leake County, Mississippi, United States. Good Hope is located on Mississippi Highway 13 10.3 miles (16.6 km) west-northwest of Walnut Grove.

== History ==
In 1900, the community was home to two churches and had a population of 100. A post office operated under the name Good Hope from 1854 to 1907. Good Hope was once home to the Good Hope Academy.
