= James Wesley Mathis =

American politician

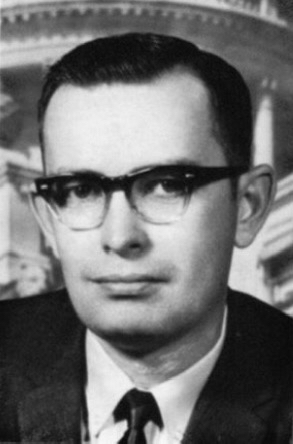

Member of the Mississippi House of Representatives
- In office 1960–1968

Personal details
- Born: September 17, 1934 Lena, Mississippi, U.S.
- Died: August 23, 2002 (aged 67) Jackson, Mississippi, U.S.

James Wesley Mathis (September 17, 1934 – August 23, 2002) was an American politician. He served as a member of the Mississippi House of Representatives.

== Life and career ==
Mathis was born in Lena, Mississippi on September 17, 1934. He was a salesman.

Mathis served in the Mississippi House of Representatives from 1960 to 1968.

Mathis died in Jackson, Mississippi on August 23, 2002, at the age of 67.
