= Oxberry, Mississippi =

- Unincorporated community
- Location within Mississippi Location within the United States
- Coordinates: 33°47′25″N 90°02′08″W
- Country: United States
- State: Mississippi
- County: Grenada
- Elevation: 171 ft (52 m)
- Time zone: UTC-6 (Central (CST))
  - Summer (DST): UTC-5 (CDT)
- ZIP code: 38940
- Area code: 662
- GNIS feature ID: 692127

Oxberry is an unincorporated community located in Grenada County, Mississippi, United States and part of the Grenada Micropolitan Statistical Area . Oxberry is approximately 10 miles (16 km) northwest of Holcomb, Mississippi and approximately 3 miles (4.8 km) south-southeast of Cascilla, Mississippi on Mississippi Highway 35.

Oxberry is named for James Oxberry, who was a Choctaw interpreter and owned the surrounding land where the community developed.

The community was once home to a saw mill and cotton gin.

A post office operated under the name Oxberry from 1891 to 1908.

Oxberry was once located on the Rankin-Memphis Road, which was a road built through Choctaw lands prior to the Treaty of Dancing Rabbit Creek.
