= The Leake County Revelers =

- Origin: Sebastopol, Mississippi, U.S.
- Genres: Country
- Years active: 1926–1950s
- Labels: Okeh Records; Columbia Records
- Past members: Will Gilmer; R. O. Mosley; Jim Wolverton; Dallas Jones

The Leake County Revelers were a country music string band popular in the U.S. South in the 1920s and 1930s. The members were from in and around Sebastopol, Mississippi, led by fiddler Will Gilmer, with R. O. Mosley on mandolin and banjo-mandolin, Jim Wolverton on five-string banjo, and Dallas Jones on guitar. The band was formed in 1926.

They made a series of 40 recordings for Okeh Records and Columbia Records from 1927 through 1930, most recorded in New Orleans, Louisiana and Jackson, Mississippi. Their biggest hit was "Wednesday Night Waltz" followed by "Goodnight Waltz", recorded in 1927. Over 195,000 copies of this records were sold by 1931 and the 78 rpm disc remained in print continuously into the 1950s.
