= Coosa, Mississippi =

- Unincorporated community
- Location within Mississippi Location within the United States
- Coordinates: 32°50′32″N 89°25′20″W
- Country: United States
- State: Mississippi
- County: Leake
- Elevation: 460 ft (140 m)
- Time zone: UTC-6 (Central (CST))
  - Summer (DST): UTC-5 (CDT)
- Area codes: 601 & 769
- GNIS feature ID: 691786

Coosa is an unincorporated community in Leake County, in the U.S. state of Mississippi.

== History ==
Coosa is a name most likely derived from the Choctaw language; it's purported to mean "reed brake". A post office called Coosa was established in 1879, and remained in operation until 1904.
