= Hopoca, Mississippi =

Unincorporated community in Mississippi, US

- Unincorporated community
- Location within Mississippi Location within the United States
- Coordinates: 32°50′03″N 89°30′23″W
- Country: United States
- State: Mississippi
- County: Leake
- Elevation: 397 ft (121 m)
- Time zone: UTC-6 (Central (CST))
  - Summer (DST): UTC-5 (CDT)
- Area codes: 601 & 769
- GNIS feature ID: 691942

Hopoca is an unincorporated community in Leake County, Mississippi, in the United States.

== History ==
The etymology of Hopoca is unclear. According to one source, Hopoca is a Choctaw name likely meaning either "distant" or "one who picks or grazes". The community was founded in the 1830s by W. M. Hall, who moved to the area from Tennessee. A post office operated under the name Hopoca from 1894 to 1907.

In 1842, the Choctaws Claim Commission met in Hopoca. The Commission was formed to disperse land after the Treaty of Dancing Rabbit Creek. Commissioners present included J.F.H. Claiborne, William M. Gwin and Charles Fisher (who was a former member of the United States House of Representatives from North Carolina and was serving as a land agent at the time).
