= Lamar Q. C. Williams =

American politician

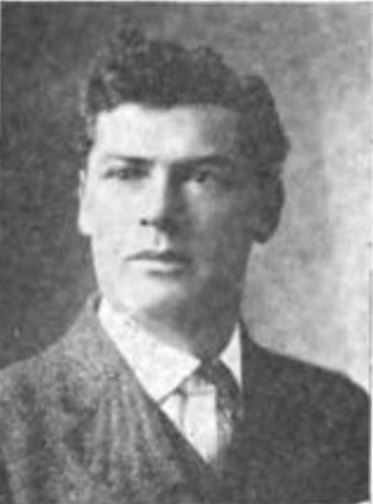
- c. 1917

Member of the Mississippi State Senate from the 13th district
- In office January 2, 1934 – August 6, 1934
- Preceded by: W. C. Mabry
- In office January 1916 – January 1920

Member of the Mississippi House of Representatives from the Newton County district
- In office January 1928 – January 1932
- In office January 1920 – January 1924

Personal details
- Born: April 18, 1881 Beech Springs, Neshoba County, Mississippi, U.S.
- Died: August 6, 1934 (aged 53) Union, Mississippi, U.S.
- Party: Democratic
- Children: 2

Lamar Quintus Cincinnatus Williams (April 18, 1881 - August 6, 1934) was an American store owner and Democratic politician. He was a member of the Mississippi Legislature, representing Newton County, in the early 20th century.

== Early life ==
Lamar Quintus Cincinnatus Williams was born on April 18, 1881, in Beech Springs, Neshoba County, Mississippi. He was the son of Oscar Lane Williams and Malee (Stewart) Williams. Williams attended the public schools of Neshoba County and Harpersville College. He attended Millsaps College, but left in his sophomore year to teach at a school, which he did from 1904 to 1909. He then opened a general mercantile business.

== Political career ==
Before 1915, was a member of the Board of Aldermen of Union, Mississippi, for two years. He was also a member of the Democratic Executive Committee of Newton County for four years. In November 1915, he was elected to represent Mississippi's 13th senatorial district as a Democrat in the Mississippi Senate, for the 1916-1920 term. In 1919, he was elected to represent Newton County in the Mississippi House of Representatives and served in the 1920-1924 term. In 1927, he was re-elected and served in the 1928-1932 term. After winning a special election in August 1933 after Senator W. C. Mabry was appointed postmaster, Williams rejoined the Senate in the 1934 session.

== Personal life and death ==
Williams was a Woodman of the World and a first-degree Mason. He married Josie Mae McDonald in 1905, and they had two children, Lamar Carruth and Mary Ella. Williams died in office of a heart attack at his home in Union, Mississippi, early on August 6, 1934, aged 53.
