= Maxie, Mississippi =

- Unincorporated community
- Location within the state of Mississippi Maxie, Mississippi (the United States)
- Coordinates: 30°58′41″N 89°11′45″W
- Country: United States
- State: Mississippi
- County: Forrest
- Time zone: UTC-6 (Central (CST))
  - Summer (DST): UTC-5 (CDT)
- GNIS feature ID: 693891

Maxie is an unincorporated area in Forrest County, Mississippi, United States. It lies within the De Soto National Forest and was a stop on the Gulf and Ship Island Railroad (G&SIRR). It had a post office from 1900 until 1967. In 1964 it had a population of 125. William Henry Bucklew, who became mayor of Laurel, Mississippi and published the Southern Baptist News, was born in Maxie. Beaverdam Creek runs through Maxie.

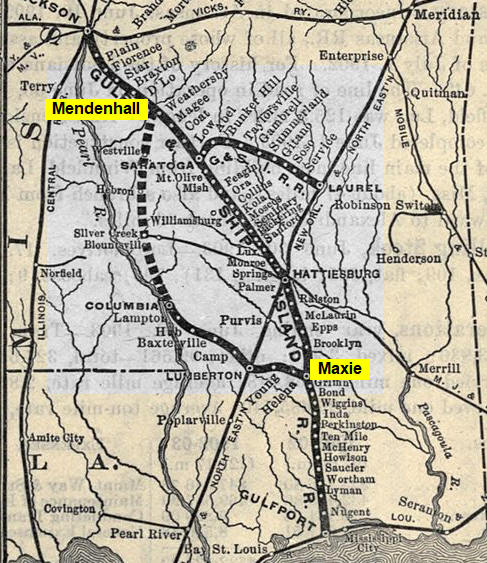
G&SIRR Maxie to Mendenhall loop

In the early 1900s, at the height of the timber boom in Mississippi, the G&SIRR built a loop off the main railroad line so as to connect Maxie to Mendenhall, Mississippi. At that time, the town of Maxie was reported to be prosperous.

Camp and Hinton Company built a rail line for forest products terminating in Maxie. Operation of the line changed hands several times and varied from forest products to freight and passengers. By about 1930, the area's forests had been depleted.

Once the virgin pine resource was exhausted in south Mississippi, small towns like Maxie, that depended on commerce in forest products, faded rapidly. In 2019, a church and cemetery were the only features bearing the Maxie name.

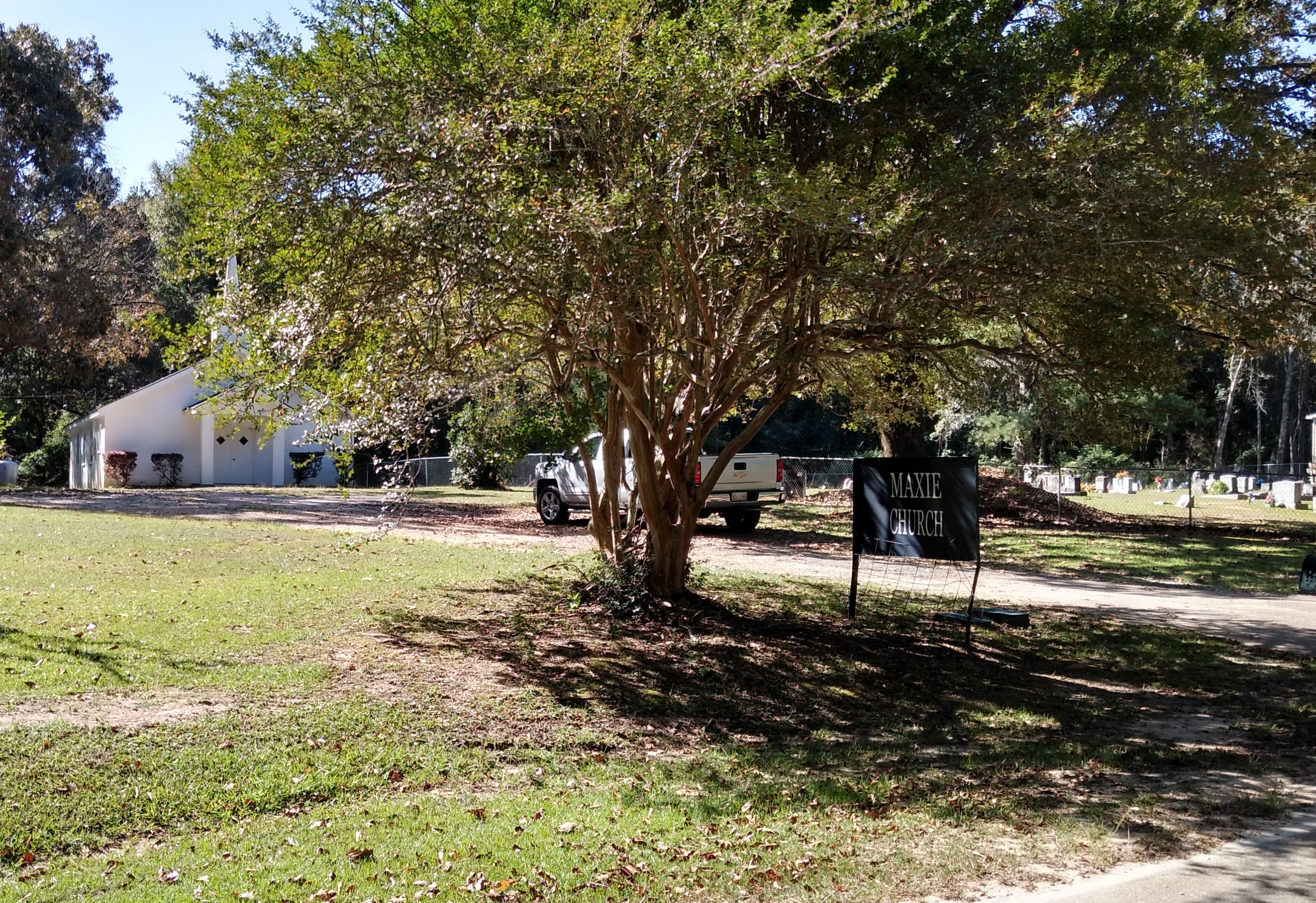
Maxie church and cemetery
