= Forkville, Mississippi =

- Unincorporated community
- Location within Mississippi Location within the United States
- Coordinates: 32°27′39″N 89°39′39″W
- Country: United States
- State: Mississippi
- County: Scott
- Elevation: 384 ft (117 m)
- Time zone: UTC-6 (Central (CST))
  - Summer (DST): UTC-5 (CDT)
- Area codes: 601 & 769
- GNIS feature ID: 711463

Forkville is an unincorporated community in Scott County, Mississippi, United States. Forkville is located at the junction of Mississippi Highway 13 and Mississippi Highway 483, 7.4 miles (11.9 km) north of Morton. Forkville had a post office until March 19, 1994.

== History ==
Forkville is named due to the fact that it is located at the fork of Mississippi Highways 13 and 483. The community was initially known as New Beach to distinguish it from the older community of the same name located to the south. The Scott County Fair was first held in Forkville prior to eventually moving to Forest.

Forkville is located on Coffee Bogue and in 1900 had a population of 22.
