= Golden Memorial State Park =

State park in Mississippi, United States

- Location within Mississippi
- Location: Leake County, Mississippi, United States
- Coordinates: 32°34′14″N 89°24′22″W
- Elevation: 463 ft (141 m)
- Administrator: Mississippi Department of Wildlife, Fisheries, and Parks
- Designation: Mississippi state park
- Website: Official website

Golden Memorial State Park is a public recreation area in the U.S. state of Mississippi located off Mississippi Highway 492, three miles (4.8 km) southeast of Walnut Grove.

== Activities and amenities ==
The day-use state park features fishing on a 15-acre (6.1 ha) spring-fed lake, picnic area, and nature trails.
