= Walnut Grove, Mississippi =

- Town
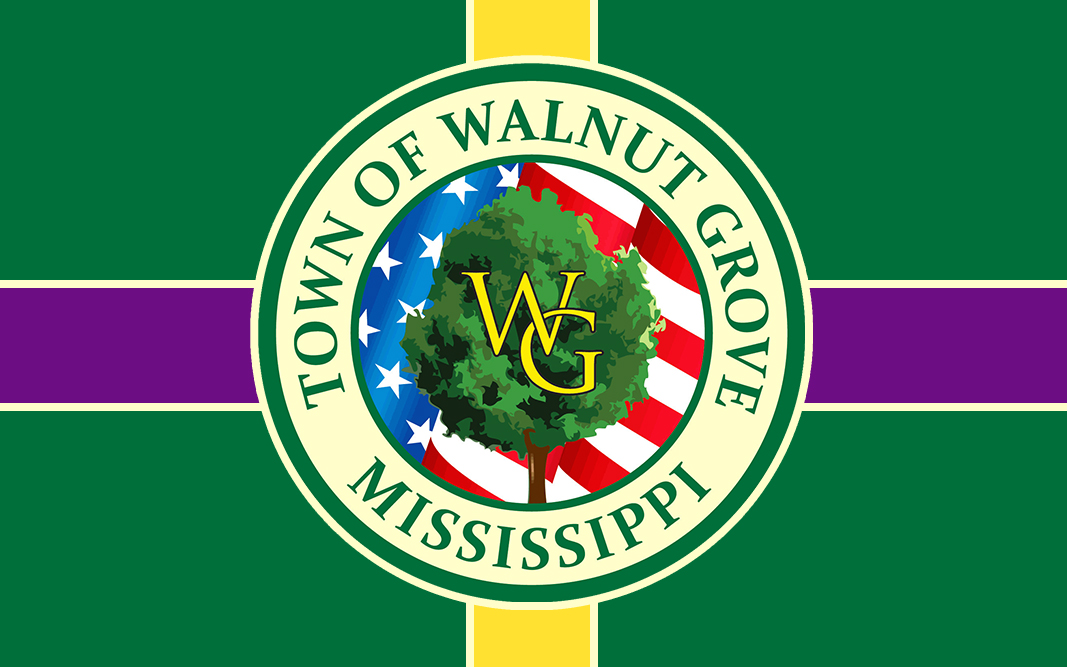
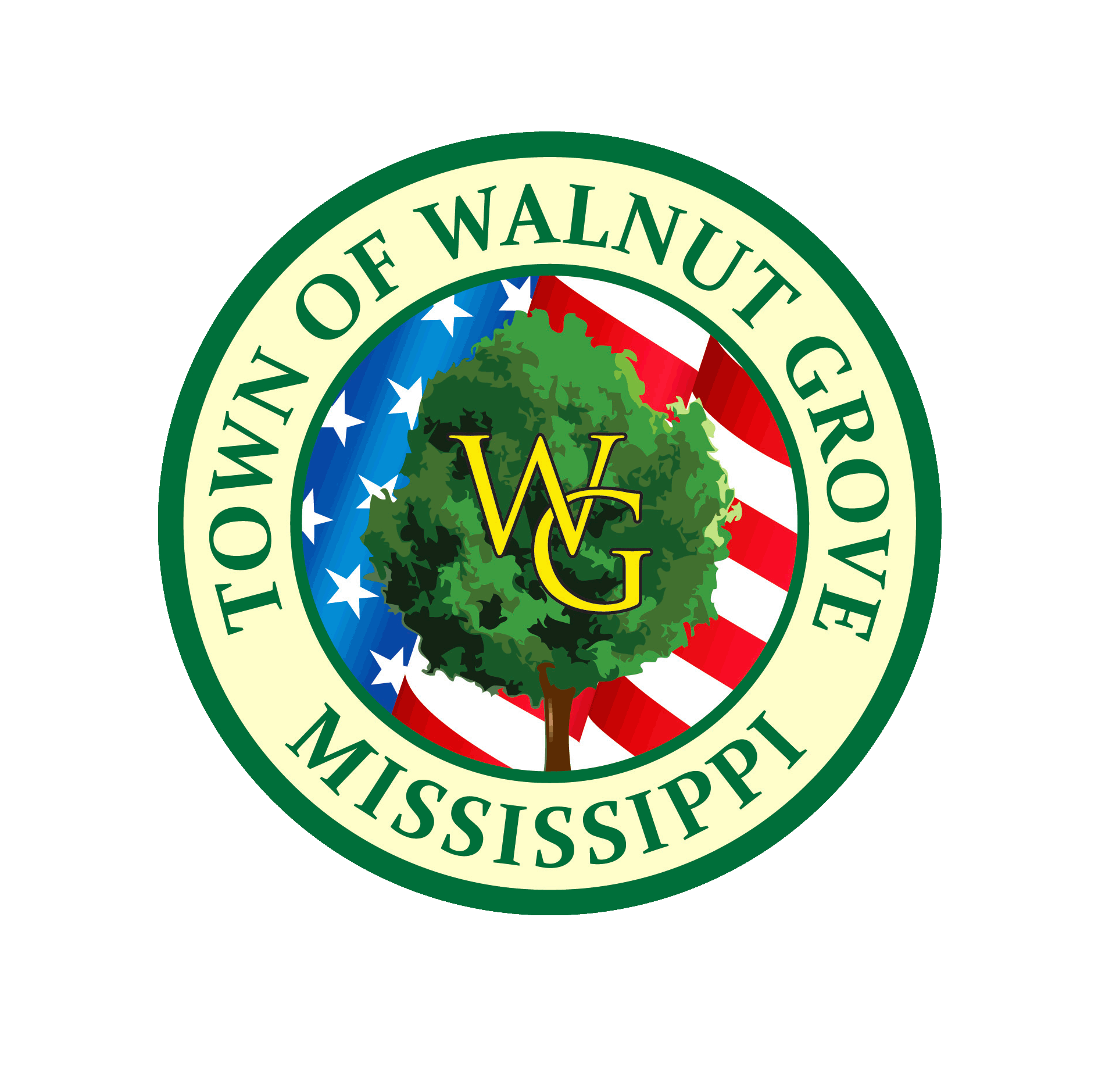
- Flag Seal

- Location of Walnut Grove, Mississippi

- Location in the United States
- Coordinates: 32°35′45″N 89°27′32″W
- Country: United States
- State: Mississippi
- County: Leake

Government
  - Mayor: Brian Gomillion
  - Board: Jerry Darby, Teresa Darby, Mike Johnson, Cindy Jones, Shantell Edwards

Area
  - Total: 1.62 sq mi (4.19 km^{2})
  - Land: 1.62 sq mi (4.19 km^{2})
  - Water: 0 sq mi (0.00 km^{2})
- Elevation: 360 ft (110 m)

Population (2020)
  - Total: 510
  - Density: 315.6/sq mi (121.86/km^{2})
- Time zone: UTC-6 (Central (CST))
  - Summer (DST): UTC-5 (CDT)
- ZIP code: 39189
- Area code: 601
- FIPS code: 28-77520
- GNIS feature ID: 0679299
- Website: www.walnutgrove-ms.com

Walnut Grove is a town in Leake County, Mississippi, United States. The population was 510 at the 2020 census, a sharp decrease from 1,911 at the 2010 census, due to the Walnut Grove Youth Correctional Facility being closed by the state in September 2016 because of repeated problems at the troubled facility. It had been privately owned and operated since 2001 under a contract with the state Department of Corrections. By 2011 it was the largest juvenile facility in the nation.

Golden Memorial State Park is located east of the town.

== History ==
Walnut Grove began as a European-American settlement in a nearby location, now referred to as "Old Walnut Grove". This area was developed as cotton plantations in the antebellum era. The town was incorporated in 1884. A post office was established in 1854, and in the early 1900s, electricity and street lights were installed.

The Jackson and Eastern Railway was completed from Union, Mississippi to Walnut Grove in 1923, and then extended to nearby Tuscola, Mississippi in 1925.

The town was surveyed at its present location in 1923. Two canals were built near Walnut Grove in the late 1920s to improve transportation. Walnut Grove received a telephone franchise in 1927, and was connected to the Forest exchange. In 1962, a sewage and water system was installed, and in 1966, natural gas was installed. In 1970, the town organized and trained a volunteer fire department, though the first fire truck was not purchased until 1974.

Walnut Grove's Town Marshal J.T. "Jake" Trest, was murdered in 1979. His killer, Edward Earl Johnson, was executed in 1987.

In 1981, William Grady Sims, was elected as mayor of Walnut Grove and was repeatedly re-elected, serving until 2012. He was one of the longest-serving mayors in the state. By 2006 the town annexed the property of the Walnut Grove Youth Correctional Facility, which had been constructed nearby in the county in 2001. It added a large area and population of prisoners to the town. As the facility was privately owned, although operated under contract to the state, it made payments to the city in lieu of taxes. In addition, the operating company appointed Sims as warden of the prison in 2009. The company's payments in lieu of taxes for the prison constituted 15% of the city's budget in 2011. State expansion of the prison population at this facility made it the largest youth facility in the nation.

In 2009, Sims took a female prisoner to a nearby motel and raped her. He was convicted of charges and sentenced to seven months in confinement. Numerous investigations of conditions at the prison resulted in a class-action suit filed in 2010 in federal court against its management and the state. The federal government started a separate investigation by the Department of Justice. Sims resigned as warden. In 2011 he was indicted on two federal charges; in February 2012 he resigned as mayor under a federal plea agreement.

In October 2011, he was ordered by the state auditor to pay "$31,530 for using city employees and equipment to work on private prisons in the area, including the one he ran."

== Geography ==
According to the United States Census Bureau, the town has a total area of 0.8 square miles (2.1 km^{2}), all land.

=== Cityscape ===
The community's town hall, post office, and library are in the central part of Walnut Grove.

== Demographics ==
Historical population
Census	Pop.	Note	%±
1890	166		—
1900	207		24.7%
1910	199		−3.9%
1930	753		—
1940	653		−13.3%
1950	517		−20.8%
1960	433		−16.2%
1970	398		−8.1%
1980	439		10.3%
1990	389		−11.4%
2000	488		25.4%
2010	1,911		291.6%
2020	510		−73.3%
U.S. Decennial Census

Walnut Grove racial composition as of 2020 (NH = Non-Hispanic) (Note: Note: the US Census treats Hispanic/Latino as an ethnic category. This table excludes Latinos from the racial categories and assigns them to a separate category. Hispanics/Latinos can be of any race.)
Race	Number	Percentage
White (NH)	135	26.47%
Black or African American (NH)	355	69.61%
Native American or Alaska Native (NH)	3	0.59%
Asian (NH)	1	0.2%
Some Other Race (NH)	2	0.39%
Mixed/Multi-Racial (NH)	6	1.18%
Hispanic or Latino	8	1.57%
Total	510	

As of the 2020 United States census, there were 510 people, 286 households, and 172 families residing in the town.

As of the census of 2000, there were 488 people, 215 households, and 127 families residing in the town. The population density was 610.2 inhabitants per square mile (235.6/km^{2}). There were 239 housing units at an average density of 298.9 units per square mile (115.4 units/km^{2}). The racial makeup of the town was 57.38% White, 40.78% African American, 0.20% Native American, 0.20% Pacific Islander, and 1.43% from two or more races. Hispanic or Latino of any race were 0.41% of the population.

There were 215 households, out of which 31.6% had children under the age of 18 living with them, 35.3% were married couples living together, 20.9% had a female householder with no husband present, and 40.5% were non-families. 36.7% of all households were made up of individuals, and 14.9% had someone living alone who was 65 years of age or older. The average household size was 2.27 and the average family size was 3.00.

In the town, the population was spread out, with 29.1% under the age of 18, 6.8% from 18 to 24, 26.0% from 25 to 44, 22.5% from 45 to 64, and 15.6% who were 65 years of age or older. The median age was 36 years. For every 100 females, there were 86.3 males. For every 100 females age 18 and over, there were 79.3 males.

The median income for a household in the town was $21,719, and the median income for a family was $27,981. Males had a median income of $21,667 versus $26,000 for females. The per capita income for the town was $11,851. About 25.2% of families and 29.8% of the population were below the poverty line, including 47.1% of those under age 18 and 15.1% of those age 65 or over.

The 2006 population estimate had 1,424 residents; this dramatic increase is due to the annexation of the Walnut Grove Correctional Facility and its inmate population. The continued growth through estimates for 2016 largely represented additional inmate population.

== Economy ==
Marco Apparel, a clothing manufacturer, opened in Walnut Grove in 1984. In 2001, it laid off more than 100 employees. The city was struggling to survive.

In 2001, the privately owned Walnut Grove Youth Correctional Facility was opened in unincorporated county land after being constructed for private operation under contract with the state; it was designed for youth offenders of 18 and under in age. Originally it was considered a model facility. But the state kept raising the age of offenders who were incarcerated there, and some prisoners aged there, so the population included young men in their 20s as well as much younger youths.

From 2003 to 2010, the prison was operated by Cornell Companies, which merged that year with GEO Group. The town annexed the prison property before 2006, thereby markedly increasing its population. The prisoners outnumbered town residents by a two to one ratio. In addition to hiring town residents as guards and staff, the prison paid the city substantial amounts in lieu of taxes, with payments making up 15% of the city's annual budget in 2011. The facility was subject of many state and federal investigations and was closed in September 2016.

== Government ==
The Town of Walnut Grove has an alderman/mayor form of government, with the mayor voting in case of a tie. City government is made up of six elected aldermen from single-member districts, a mayor elected at-large, an elected municipal clerk, and an appointed police chief.

The mayor is Brian Gomillion, elected in 2013, and the Board of Aldermen includes: Jerry Darby, Teresa Darby, Pamela Gill, Shantell Edwards, Cindy Jones, and Mike Johnson.

== Education ==
The town is served by the Leake County School District, the sole school district of the county:

- Leake County Elementary (K-6)
- Leake County High School (7–12)

In 2026, Leake County High School's high school component will consolidate into Leake Central High School, while its middle school students will be assigned to middle schools.

East Central Community College covers Leake County.

== Notable people ==
- Thomas Norman Brooks, former member of the Mississippi Senate
- Homer Casteel, Lieutenant Governor of Mississippi 1920 to 1924
- Jerrion Ealy, National Football League wide receiver
- Sue Gunter, Olympic silver medalist and member of the Basketball Hall of Fame; former coach of the LSU Lady Tigers
- Na'Taki Osborne Jelks, environmental scientist
- Edward Earl Johnson, convicted of murder. Executed in 1987.
- Ken Lewis, former CEO, President, and Chairman of the Bank of America
- Luther Riley, college basketball coach; grew up in Walnut Grove
