= Madden, Mississippi =

- Unincorporated community
- Location within Mississippi Location within the United States
- Coordinates: 32°40′44″N 89°20′53″W
- Country: United States
- State: Mississippi
- County: Leake
- Elevation: 443 ft (135 m)
- Time zone: UTC-6 (Central (CST))
  - Summer (DST): UTC-5 (CDT)
- ZIP code: 39109
- Area codes: 601 & 769
- GNIS feature ID: 673050

Madden is an unincorporated community in Leake County, Mississippi. It had a population of 74 in 2006. Madden is the home of Leake Academy, a private nonprofit Christian school grades K4 through 12. It was established in January 1970.

== History ==
A post office first began operating under the name Madden in 1880.

== Madden NFL 07 ==
Video game manufacturer EA Sports released Madden NFL 07 in Madden, because it is the only community in the United States to have the same name as football personality John Madden, for whom the game was named.

Each resident received a free Xbox 360 gaming console and a free copy of Madden NFL 07. NFL stars Jerry Rice, Warren Moon, and Marshall Faulk attended the release ceremony.

== Notable people ==
- Art Gardner, former Major League Baseball player
