= Lena, Mississippi =

- Town
- Location of Lena, Mississippi

- Location in the United States Lena, Mississippi (Mississippi)
- Coordinates: 32°35′22″N 89°35′41″W
- Country: United States
- State: Mississippi
- County: Leake

Area
  - Total: 1.66 sq mi (4.30 km^{2})
  - Land: 1.66 sq mi (4.30 km^{2})
  - Water: 0 sq mi (0.00 km^{2})
- Elevation: 344 ft (105 m)

Population (2020)
  - Total: 157
  - Density: 94.5/sq mi (36.49/km^{2})
- Time zone: UTC-6 (Central (CST))
  - Summer (DST): UTC-5 (CDT)
- ZIP code: 39094
- Area code: 601
- FIPS code: 28-40360
- GNIS feature ID: 0693710

Lena is a town in Leake County, Mississippi, United States. As of the 2020 census, Lena had a population of 157. The center of population of Mississippi is located in Lena.

== Geography ==
Lena is located in southwestern Leake County at 32°35′22″N 89°35′41″W (32.589445, -89.594788). It is 10 miles (16 km) southwest of Carthage, the county seat, and 40 miles (64 km) northeast from Jackson (straight line).

According to the United States Census Bureau, the town has a total area of 1.7 square miles (4.3 km^{2}), all land.

== Demographics ==
Historical population
Census	Pop.	Note	%±
1920	198		—
1930	432		118.2%
1940	3,700		756.5%
1950	4,736		28.0%
1960	6,295		32.9%
1970	233		−96.3%
1980	231		−0.9%
1990	175		−24.2%
2000	167		−4.6%
2010	148		−11.4%
2020	157		6.1%
U.S. Decennial Census

As of the census of 2000, there were 167 people, 77 households, and 48 families residing in the town. The population density was 99.3 inhabitants per square mile (38.3/km^{2}). There were 96 housing units at an average density of 57.1 per square mile (22.0/km^{2}). The racial makeup of the town was 90.42% White, 8.98% African American, and 0.60% from two or more races.

There were 77 households, out of which 23.4% had children under the age of 18 living with them, 54.5% were married couples living together, 3.9% had a female householder with no husband present, and 36.4% were non-families. 35.1% of all households were made up of individuals, and 24.7% had someone living alone who was 65 years of age or older. The average household size was 2.17 and the average family size was 2.76.

In the town, the population was spread out, with 21.6% under the age of 18, 6.0% from 18 to 24, 24.0% from 25 to 44, 28.7% from 45 to 64, and 19.8% who were 65 years of age or older. The median age was 44 years. For every 100 females, there were 87.6 males. For every 100 females age 18 and over, there were 79.5 males.

The median income for a household in the town was $36,250, and the median income for a family was $45,313. Males had a median income of $30,625 versus $20,625 for females. The per capita income for the town was $23,197. About 8.9% of families and 13.6% of the population were below the poverty line, including 13.8% of those under the age of eighteen and none of those 65 or over.

== Education ==
The town is served by the Leake County School District, the sole school district of the county.

East Central Community College covers Leake County.

== Notable people ==
- Joseph H. Beeman, member of the United States House of Representatives from 1891 to 1893
- Deuce McAllister, former running back for the New Orleans Saints from 2001-2008
