= Union, Mississippi =

- Town
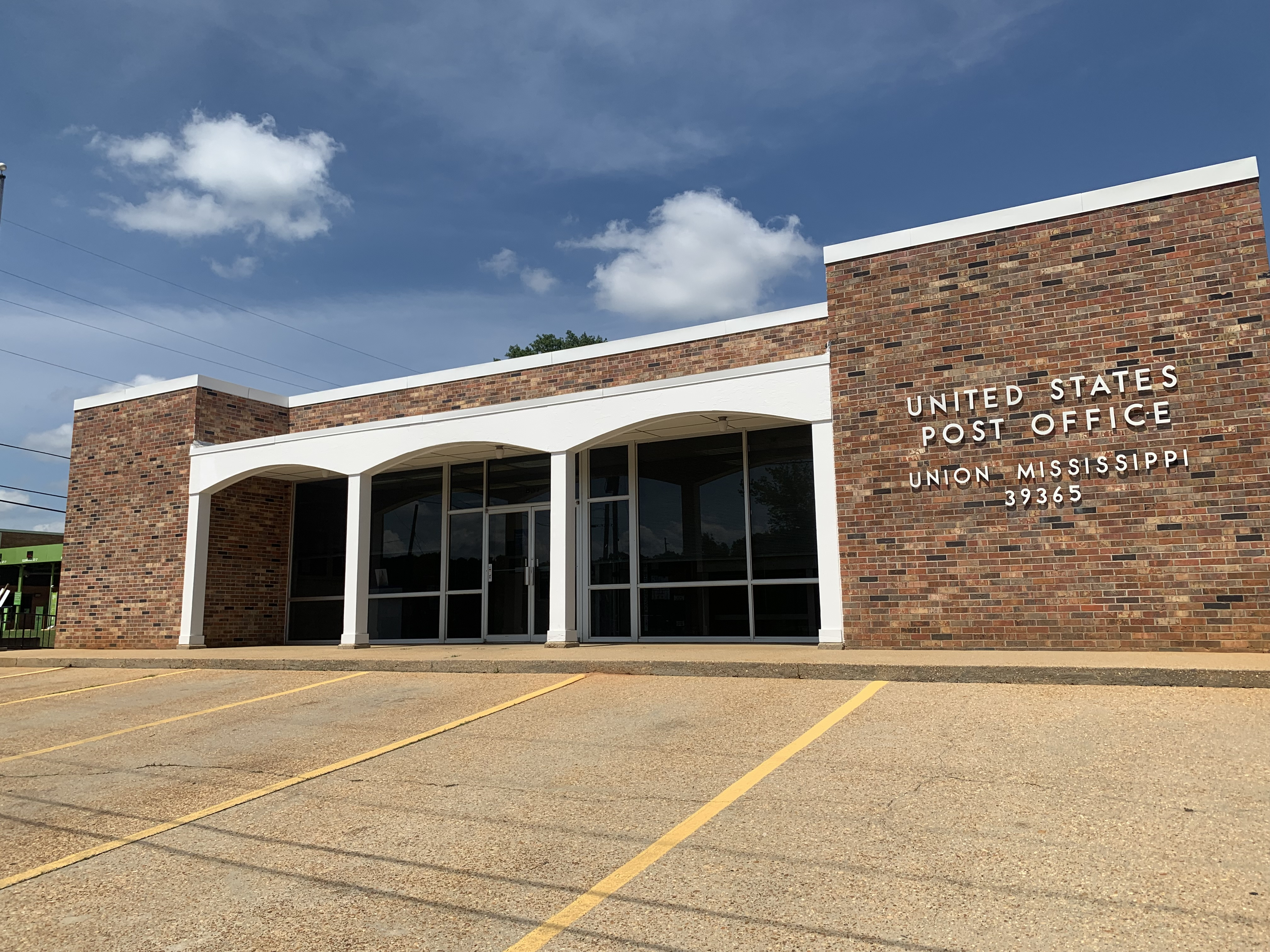
- Post Office in Union, Mississippi
- Nickname: "U-Town"
- Location of Union, Mississippi

- Location in the United States
- Coordinates: 32°34′17″N 89°7′5″W
- Country: United States
- State: Mississippi
- Counties: Newton and Neshoba

Area
  - Total: 3.42 sq mi (8.87 km^{2})
  - Land: 3.42 sq mi (8.87 km^{2})
  - Water: 0 sq mi (0.00 km^{2})
- Elevation: 482 ft (147 m)

Population (2020)
  - Total: 2,042
  - Density: 596.1/sq mi (230.15/km^{2})
- Time zone: UTC-6 (Central (CST))
  - Summer (DST): UTC-5 (CDT)
- ZIP code: 39365
- Area code: 601
- FIPS code: 28-75360
- GNIS feature ID: 0679032
- Website: www.cityofunionms.gov

Union is a town in Neshoba and Newton counties, Mississippi. The population was 2,042 at the 2020 census.

== Geography ==
Union is located at 32°34′17″N 89°7′5″W (32.571320, -89.118118). Most of the town is in Newton County with a portion extending north into adjacent Neshoba County. In the 2000 census, 1,496 of the town's 2,021 residents (74.0%) lived in Newton County and 525 (26.0%) in Neshoba County.

According to the United States Census Bureau, the town has a total area of 3.4 square miles (8.9 km^{2}), all land.

== History ==
In February 1864, General William Tecumseh Sherman crossed Newton County, burning the county seat at Decatur and was nearly captured during the Meridian Campaign. Sherman stopped during the return trip from Meridian and slept at Boler's Inn in Union. Sherman reportedly ordered the town not to be burned because the Union was what his men were fighting to save, and instead made the town a temporary headquarters.

== Demographics ==
Historical population
Census	Pop.	Note	%±
1910	693		—
1920	1,012		46.0%
1930	1,705		68.5%
1940	1,543		−9.5%
1950	1,559		1.0%
1960	1,726		10.7%
1970	1,856		7.5%
1980	1,931		4.0%
1990	1,875		−2.9%
2000	2,021		7.8%
2010	1,988		−1.6%
2020	2,042		2.7%
U.S. Decennial Census

=== 2020 census ===
As of the 2020 census, Union had a population of 2,042. The median age was 39.6 years. 26.4% of residents were under the age of 18 and 22.5% of residents were 65 years of age or older. For every 100 females there were 81.2 males, and for every 100 females age 18 and over there were 75.3 males age 18 and over. There were 705 households and 569 families residing in the town.

0.0% of residents lived in urban areas, while 100.0% lived in rural areas.

Of households, 39.3% had children under the age of 18 living in them. Of all households, 36.2% were married-couple households, 19.7% were households with a male householder and no spouse or partner present, and 39.1% were households with a female householder and no spouse or partner present. About 29.0% of all households were made up of individuals and 14.8% had someone living alone who was 65 years of age or older.

There were 800 housing units, of which 11.9% were vacant. The homeowner vacancy rate was 2.2% and the rental vacancy rate was 5.7%.

Racial composition as of the 2020 census
Race	Number	Percent
White	1,312	64.3%
Black or African American	671	32.9%
American Indian and Alaska Native	9	0.4%
Asian	4	0.2%
Native Hawaiian and Other Pacific Islander	0	0.0%
Some other race	3	0.1%
Two or more races	43	2.1%
Hispanic or Latino (of any race)	22	1.1%

=== 2000 census ===
As of the census of 2000, there were 2,021 people, 780 households, and 509 families residing in the town. The population density was 589.0 inhabitants per square mile (227.4/km^{2}). There were 884 housing units at an average density of 257.6 per square mile (99.5/km^{2}). The racial makeup of the town was 62.84% White, 35.53% African American, 0.35% Native American, 0.20% Asian, 0.05% from other races, and 1.04% from two or more races. Hispanic or Latino of any race were 0.64% of the population.

There were 780 households, out of which 31.8% had children under the age of 18 living with them, 43.1% were married couples living together, 18.8% had a female householder with no husband present, and 34.7% were non-families. 32.3% of all households were made up of individuals, and 18.1% had someone living alone who was 65 years of age or older. The average household size was 2.46 and the average family size was 3.12.

In the town, the population was spread out, with 27.2% under the age of 18, 8.6% from 18 to 24, 23.1% from 25 to 44, 19.7% from 45 to 64, and 21.5% who were 65 years of age or older. The median age was 38 years. For every 100 females, there were 79.0 males. For every 100 females age 18 and over, there were 74.0 males.

The median income for a household in the town was $21,696, and the median income for a family was $28,542. Males had a median income of $26,667 versus $17,328 for females. The per capita income for the town was $12,176. About 28.4% of families and 35.2% of the population were below the poverty line, including 49.7% of those under age 18 and 37.4% of those age 65 or over.

== Education ==
The Town of Union is served by the Union Public School District.

East Central Community College covers both Neshoba and Newton counties. It has its main campus in Decatur.

== Notable people ==
- Trent Kelly, member of the U.S. House of Representatives from Mississippi's 1st congressional district
- Billy Nicholson, member of the Mississippi House of Representatives
- William Redd, businessman and philanthropist
- Lamar Q. C. Williams, former member of the Mississippi House of Representatives and Mississippi State Senate
