= Tuscola, Mississippi =

- Unincorporated community
- Location within Mississippi Location within the United States
- Coordinates: 32°37′12″N 89°31′40″W
- Country: United States
- State: Mississippi
- County: Leake
- Elevation: 358 ft (109 m)
- Time zone: UTC-6 (Central (CST))
  - Summer (DST): UTC-5 (CDT)
- Area codes: 601 & 769
- GNIS feature ID: 695030

Tuscola is an unincorporated community in Leake County, in the U.S. state of Mississippi.

== History ==
Tuscola is located on the former Gulf, Mobile and Ohio Railroad and was once home to a cotton gin, three large lumber mills, and two general stores.

A post office was established at Tuscola in 1872, and remained in operation until 1924. The community derives its name from the first three syllables of Tuscolameta Creek, which flows near the site.

In 1900, Tuscola had a population of 41.
