= Tuscolameta Creek =

Stream in Mississippi, United States

Coordinates: 32.6187493°N 89.5000695°W

Tuscolameta Creek is a stream in the U.S. state of Mississippi.

Tuscolameta is a name derived from the Choctaw language meaning "young warrior". Variant names include "Tuscalameta", "Tuscalamita Creek", "Tushalamita", and "Tuskala Mita Creek".

In 1924, the Tuscolameta Creek received a 24-mile channelization to empty into the Pearl River.
