= Sebastopol, Mississippi =

- Town
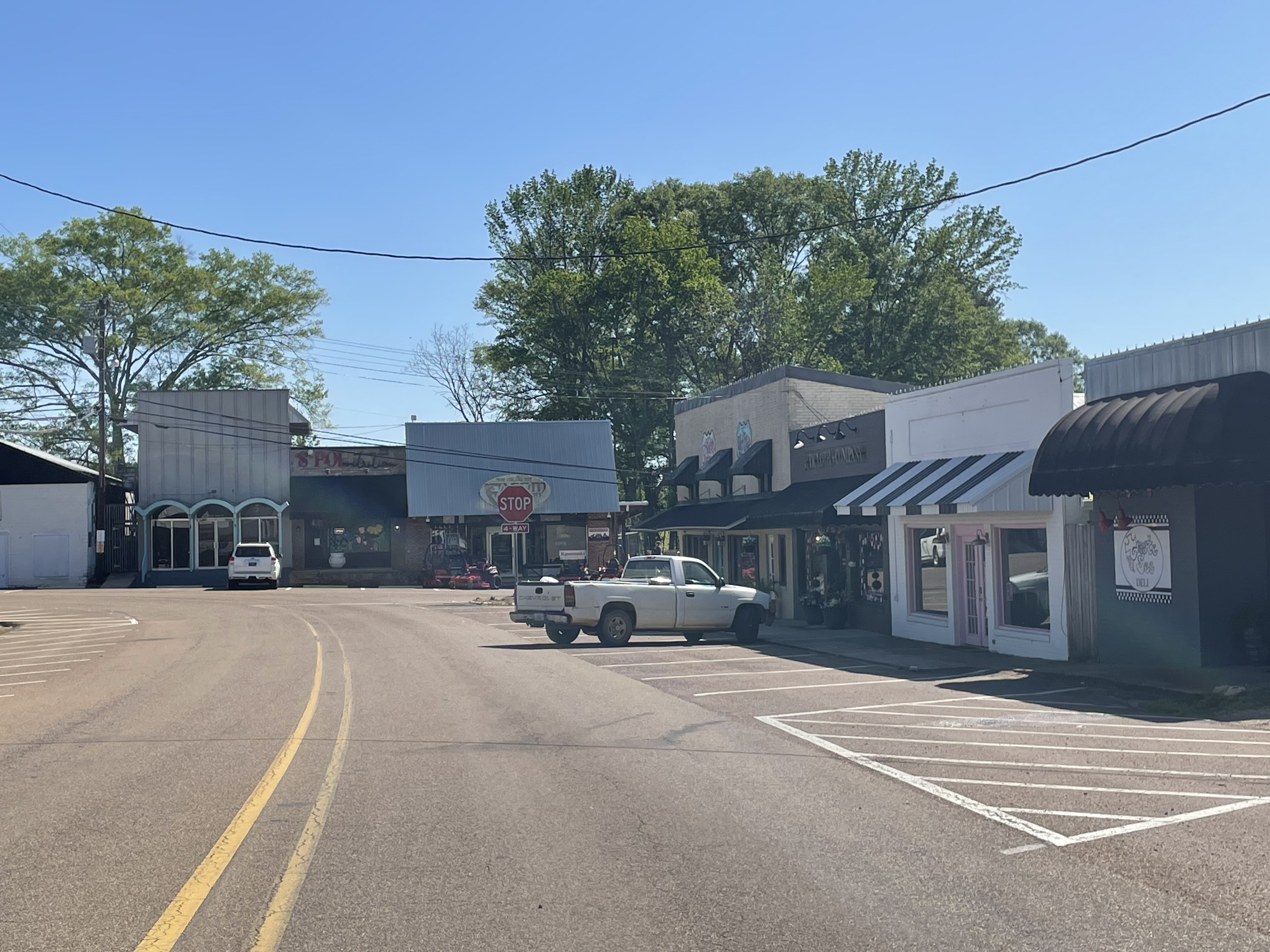
- Downtown Sebastopol

- Location of Sebastopol, Mississippi

- Location in the United States
- Coordinates: 32°34′22″N 89°20′10″W
- Country: United States
- State: Mississippi
- County: Scott, Leake

Area
  - Total: 1.57 sq mi (4.06 km^{2})
  - Land: 1.57 sq mi (4.06 km^{2})
  - Water: 0 sq mi (0.00 km^{2})
- Elevation: 420 ft (128 m)

Population (2020)
  - Total: 266
  - Density: 169.8/sq mi (65.55/km^{2})
- Time zone: UTC-6 (Central (CST))
  - Summer (DST): UTC-5 (CDT)
- ZIP code: 39359
- Area code: 601
- FIPS code: 28-66280
- GNIS feature ID: 0677487

Sebastopol is a town in Leake and Scott counties, Mississippi. The population was 266 at the 2020 census.

== History ==
Sebastopol was originally called "Hathaway Springs". The town was in existence before the Civil War but not incorporated until 1917. According to oral tradition, "a Swede" traveling through the area named the town for Sevastopol, Crimea. It is rumored that the "Swede" was Frederick Law Olmsted (of Central Park fame) who stayed at Sebastopol House in Seguin, Texas during his travels throughout the southern United States. From 1852 to 1857, Olmsted was sent to the southern United States by his employer, The New York Times, to study and write about slavery. It was published as Journeys and Explorations in the Cotton Kingdom.

Each fall season Sebastopol has Sebastopolooza–a fairly large fall festival. In 2010 Sebastopolooza had over a thousand people.

Sebastopol is centrally located between four larger towns, the towns of Forest, Carthage, Union and Philadelphia. Although the town has a local grocery store, most people drive to one of the larger towns to purchase basic household goods. The nearest theatre is a small local operation located in Philadelphia, Mississippi.

The town got access to cable TV in the late 1990s, which has yet to be offered to areas located just outside the city limits. Most local people wishing to have television must subscribe to satellite programming. This makes accessibility to high-speed internet almost impossible. On October 11, 2010, all cable services from Sky Cablevision, the only cable provider for Sebastopol, were disconnected.

== Geography ==
Most of the town is located in Scott County, with a small portion in Leake County. In the 2000 census, all of the city's 233 residents lived in Scott County. No residents lived in the Leake County portion in 2000, and one person lived there in 2006.

According to the United States Census Bureau, the town has a total area of 1.5 square miles (3.9 km^{2}), all land.

== Demographics ==
Historical population
Census	Pop.	Note	%±
1930	355		—
1940	403		13.5%
1950	330		−18.1%
1960	343		3.9%
1970	268		−21.9%
1980	314		17.2%
1990	281		−10.5%
2000	233		−17.1%
2010	272		16.7%
2020	266		−2.2%
U.S. Decennial Census

Sebastopol racial composition as of 2020 (NH = Non-Hispanic) (Note: Note: the US Census treats Hispanic/Latino as an ethnic category. This table excludes Latinos from the racial categories and assigns them to a separate category. Hispanics/Latinos can be of any race.)
Race	Number	Percentage
White (NH)	207	77.82%
Black or African American (NH)	45	16.92%
Native American or Alaska Native (NH)	1	0.38%
Mixed/Multi-Racial (NH)	3	1.13%
Hispanic or Latino	10	3.76%
Total	278	

As of the 2020 United States census, there were 266 people, 115 households, and 81 families residing in the town.

As of the census of 2000, there were 233 people, 107 households, and 66 families residing in the town. The population density was 159.4 inhabitants per square mile (61.5/km^{2}). There were 118 housing units at an average density of 80.7 per square mile (31.2/km^{2}). The racial makeup of the town was 95.28% White, 3.00% African American, 0.86% Native American, 0.86% from other races. Hispanic or Latino of any race were 1.72% of the population.

There were 107 households, out of which 28.0% had children under the age of 18 living with them, 46.7% were married couples living together, 10.3% had a female householder with no husband present, and 38.3% were non-families. 37.4% of all households were made up of individuals, and 18.7% had someone living alone who was 65 years of age or older. The average household size was 2.18 and the average family size was 2.83.

In the town, the age distribution of the population shows 21.5% under the age of 18, 9.4% from 18 to 24, 26.6% from 25 to 44, 24.9% from 45 to 64, and 17.6% who were 65 years of age or older. The median age was 40 years. For every 100 females, there were 95.8 males. For every 100 females age 18 and over, there were 92.6 males.

The median income for a household in the town was $31,250, and the median income for a family was $47,500. Males had a median income of $26,625 versus $25,000 for females. The per capita income for the town was $23,630. About 9.5% of families and 18.6% of the population were below the poverty line, including 23.8% of those under the age of eighteen and 28.2% of those sixty-five or over.

== Education ==
The portion of the town of Sebastopol in Scott County is within the Scott County School District. The district has one public K-12 school, Sebastopol Attendance Center, which has the mascot Sebastopol Bobcats.

The Leake County portion is in the Leake County School District. A 1969 desegregation order allowed people in a southern part of Leake County to attend the Scott County district's Sebastapol school. In 2010 a court ordered that such students (except those with parents with jobs in the relevant county) attend school in Leake County. This decision affected about 70-75 students.

Sebastopol also has a private school, Pine Grove Christian Academy, owned and operated by Pine Grove Pentecostal Church.

East Central Community College covers Leake and Scott counties. It operates the Forest/Scott County Career-Technical Center in Forest.

== Notable people ==
- The Leake County Revelers, country music string band
