= Leake County, Mississippi =

County in Mississippi, United States

- County
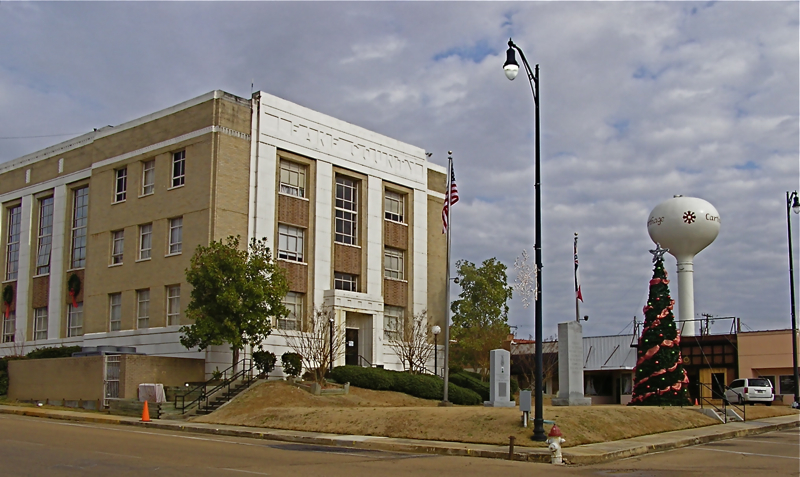
- Leake County Courthouse in Carthage

- Location within the U.S. state of Mississippi
- Coordinates: 32°45′N 89°31′W
- Country: United States
- State: Mississippi
- Founded: 1833
- Named for: Walter Leake
- Seat: Carthage
- Largest city: Carthage

Area
  - Total: 585 sq mi (1,520 km^{2})
  - Land: 583 sq mi (1,510 km^{2})
  - Water: 2.5 sq mi (6.5 km^{2}) 0.4%

Population (2020)
  - Total: 21,275
  - Estimate (2025): 21,662 ▲
  - Density: 36.5/sq mi (14.1/km^{2})
- Time zone: UTC−6 (Central)
  - Summer (DST): UTC−5 (CDT)
- Congressional district: 2nd
- Website: www.leakecountyms.org

Leake County is a county in the center of the U.S. state of Mississippi. As of the 2020 census, the population was 21,275. Its county seat is Carthage. The county is named for Walter Leake, the Governor of Mississippi from 1822 to 1825.

In 2010, the center of population of Mississippi was located in Leake County, near the town of Lena.

== Geography ==
According to the U.S. Census Bureau, the county has a total area of 585 square miles (1,520 km^{2}), of which 583 square miles (1,510 km^{2}) is land and 2.5 square miles (6.5 km^{2}) (0.4%) is water.

=== Major highways ===
- Mississippi Highway 13
- Mississippi Highway 16
- Mississippi Highway 25
- Mississippi Highway 35
- Mississippi Highway 43
- Natchez Trace Parkway

=== Adjacent counties ===
- Attala County (north)
- Neshoba County (east)
- Scott County (south)
- Madison County (west)

=== National protected area ===
- Natchez Trace Parkway (part)

== Demographics ==
Historical population
Census	Pop.	Note	%±
1840	2,162		—
1850	5,533		155.9%
1860	9,324		68.5%
1870	8,496		−8.9%
1880	13,146		54.7%
1890	14,803		12.6%
1900	17,360		17.3%
1910	18,298		5.4%
1920	16,973		−7.2%
1930	21,803		28.5%
1940	24,570		12.7%
1950	21,610		−12.0%
1960	18,660		−13.7%
1970	17,085		−8.4%
1980	18,790		10.0%
1990	18,436		−1.9%
2000	20,940		13.6%
2010	23,805		13.7%
2020	21,275		−10.6%
2025 (est.)	21,662	▲	1.8%
U.S. Decennial Census; 1790-1960 1900-1990; 1990-2000 2010-2013

=== Racial and ethnic composition ===
Leake County, Mississippi – Racial and ethnic composition Note: the US Census treats Hispanic/Latino as an ethnic category. This table excludes Latinos from the racial categories and assigns them to a separate category. Hispanics/Latinos may be of any race.
Race / Ethnicity (NH = Non-Hispanic)	Pop 1980	Pop 1990	Pop 2000	Pop 2010	Pop 2020	% 1980	% 1990	% 2000	% 2010	% 2020
White alone (NH)	11,419	11,073	11,631	11,611	10,069	60.77%	60.06%	55.54%	48.78%	47.33%
Black or African American alone (NH)	6,500	6,530	7,793	9,620	8,189	34.59%	35.42%	37.22%	40.41%	38.49%
Native American or Alaska Native alone (NH)	770	776	950	1,352	1,297	4.10%	4.21%	4.54%	5.68%	6.10%
Asian alone (NH)	2	8	30	49	78	0.01%	0.04%	0.14%	0.21%	0.37%
Native Hawaiian or Pacific Islander alone (NH)	x	x	3	0	5	x	x	0.01%	0.00%	0.02%
Other race alone (NH)	0	0	2	2	42	0.00%	0.00%	0.01%	0.01%	0.20%
Mixed race or Multiracial (NH)	x	x	91	151	365	x	x	0.43%	0.63%	1.72%
Hispanic or Latino (any race)	99	49	440	1,020	1,230	0.53%	0.27%	2.10%	4.28%	5.78%
Total	18,790	18,436	20,940	23,805	21,275	100.00%	100.00%	100.00%	100.00%	100.00%

=== 2020 census ===
As of the 2020 census, the county had a population of 21,275. The median age was 38.5 years. 25.5% of residents were under the age of 18 and 17.1% of residents were 65 years of age or older. For every 100 females there were 95.4 males, and for every 100 females age 18 and over there were 93.4 males age 18 and over.

The racial makeup of the county was 47.7% White, 38.7% Black or African American, 6.7% American Indian and Alaska Native, 0.4% Asian, <0.1% Native Hawaiian and Pacific Islander, 4.2% from some other race, and 2.3% from two or more races. Hispanic or Latino residents of any race comprised 5.8% of the population.

<0.1% of residents lived in urban areas, while 100.0% lived in rural areas.

There were 8,080 households in the county, of which 34.2% had children under the age of 18 living in them. Of all households, 42.0% were married-couple households, 18.8% were households with a male householder and no spouse or partner present, and 33.5% were households with a female householder and no spouse or partner present. About 27.7% of all households were made up of individuals and 12.8% had someone living alone who was 65 years of age or older.

There were 8,979 housing units, of which 10.0% were vacant. Among occupied housing units, 74.4% were owner-occupied and 25.6% were renter-occupied. The homeowner vacancy rate was 1.1% and the rental vacancy rate was 6.6%.

=== 2010 census ===
As of the 2010 United States census, there were 23,805 people living in the county. 49.5% were White, 40.6% Black or African American, 6.0% Native American, 0.2% Asian, 2.8% of some other race and 0.8% of two or more races. 4.3% were Hispanic or Latino (of any race).

=== 2000 census ===
As of the census of 2000, there were 20,940 people, 7,611 households, and 5,563 families living in the county. The population density was 36 people per square mile (14 people/km^{2}). There were 8,585 housing units at an average density of 15 units per square mile (5.8 units/km^{2}). The racial makeup of the county was 56.14% White, 37.42% Black or African American, 4.56% Native American, 0.15% Asian, 0.03% Pacific Islander, 1.14% from other races, and 0.57% from two or more races. 2.10% of the population were Hispanic or Latino of any race.

There were 7,611 households, out of which 34.30% had children under the age of 18 living with them, 52.20% were married couples living together, 16.50% had a female householder with no husband present, and 26.90% were non-families. 24.30% of all households were made up of individuals, and 11.70% had someone living alone who was 65 years of age or older. The average household size was 2.65 and the average family size was 3.13. In the county, the population was spread out, with 26.90% under the age of 18, 10.10% from 18 to 24, 27.00% from 25 to 44, 21.70% from 45 to 64, and 14.30% who were 65 years of age or older. The median age was 35 years. For every 100 females there were 98.00 males. For every 100 females age 18 and over, there were 94.20 males.

The median income for a household in the county was $27,055, and the median income for a family was $32,147. Males had a median income of $27,367 versus $18,307 for females. The per capita income for the county was $13,365. About 18.10% of families and 23.30% of the population were below the poverty line, including 31.90% of those under age 18 and 23.90% of those age 65 or over.

== Government and infrastructure ==
The county is quite rural, with Carthage the only city and three towns.

The Mississippi Department of Corrections contracted for development of the Walnut Grove Youth Correctional Facility, which opened in 2001 in the town of Walnut Grove. The facility was operated by the private Management and Training Corporation (MTC).

By 2006, the Town of Walnut Grove annexed the land of the prison, resulting in an apparent increase in population, which was chiefly associated with prisoners. MTC was repeatedly cited for problems with poor treatment of prisoners, and abuses within the facility. The state closed it in 2016.

== Education ==
The Leake County School District is the sole school district of the county. It includes Leake Central High School.

Choctaw Tribal School System has two tribal schools in the county: Red Water Elementary School and Standing Pine Elementary School.

East Central Community College (formerly East Central Junior College) is the area community college, including Carthage Career Advancement Center in Leake County. There was a Leake County Junior College until fall 1931, when it consolidated into East Central.

== Racial segregation in schools ==
Most white students attend private schools, while black and Hispanic children attend the local public schools.

School	Total students	White students	Black students	Hispanic students	Note
Leake County	24,000	56%	37%	2%	2010 Census
Leake Academy (private)	578	571 (99%)	0 (0%)	3 (>1%)	
Leake Central High School (public)	562	132 (20%)	373 (66%)	57 (10%)	

== Politics ==
Since 1984, Leake County has supported Republican candidates at the presidential level; however Democrats usually gain at least 40% of the vote. Since then, in only 1984, 2004, and 2024 has the Republican candidate gained over 60% of the county's vote (and the Democrat under 40%).

United States presidential election results for Leake County, Mississippi
Year	Republican		Democratic		Third party(ies)	
Year	No.	%	No.	%	No.	%
1912	11	1.05%	910	86.91%	126	12.03%
1916	31	2.08%	1,434	96.05%	28	1.88%
1920	121	9.85%	1,082	88.11%	25	2.04%
1924	48	3.68%	1,255	96.32%	0	0.00%
1928	212	11.12%	1,695	88.88%	0	0.00%
1932	14	0.73%	1,903	98.81%	9	0.47%
1936	8	0.31%	2,566	99.30%	10	0.39%
1940	17	0.60%	2,802	99.26%	4	0.14%
1944	24	0.85%	2,800	99.15%	0	0.00%
1948	12	0.46%	180	6.97%	2,392	92.57%
1952	603	18.44%	2,667	81.56%	0	0.00%
1956	220	7.34%	2,475	82.53%	304	10.14%
1960	286	8.80%	953	29.32%	2,011	61.88%
1964	4,343	96.23%	170	3.77%	0	0.00%
1968	453	7.17%	1,295	20.50%	4,568	72.32%
1972	4,217	79.13%	1,053	19.76%	59	1.11%
1976	2,952	45.36%	3,415	52.47%	141	2.17%
1980	3,624	46.83%	4,033	52.12%	81	1.05%
1984	4,663	62.04%	2,845	37.85%	8	0.11%
1988	4,168	59.86%	2,787	40.03%	8	0.11%
1992	3,943	50.64%	3,333	42.81%	510	6.55%
1996	3,017	47.60%	2,902	45.79%	419	6.61%
2000	4,114	59.18%	2,793	40.18%	45	0.65%
2004	4,962	60.42%	3,212	39.11%	38	0.46%
2008	5,148	55.01%	4,151	44.35%	60	0.64%
2012	4,863	54.14%	4,079	45.41%	41	0.46%
2016	4,782	56.60%	3,584	42.42%	83	0.98%
2020	5,228	56.83%	3,897	42.36%	75	0.82%
2024	5,143	61.37%	3,182	37.97%	55	0.66%

== Communities ==
=== City ===
- Carthage (county seat)

=== Towns ===
- Lena
- Sebastopol (mostly in Scott County)
- Walnut Grove

=== Census-designated places ===
- Redwater
- Standing Pine

=== Unincorporated communities ===
- Bolatusha
- Coosa
- Edinburg
- Good Hope
- Hopoca
- Madden
- Midway
- Ofahoma
- Thomastown
- Tuscola
- Wiggins

== See also ==
- Dry counties
- National Register of Historic Places listings in Leake County, Mississippi
