= Mississippi Highway 572 =

Highway in Mississippi

Mississippi Highway 572
- Lower Centreville Road
- MS 572 highlighted in red

Route information
- Maintained by MSHC
- Length: 10.9 mi (17.5 km)
- Existed: 1957–1967

Major junctions
- West end: Centreville
- MS 24 / MS 33 in Centreville
- East end: MS 569 near Liberty

Location
- Country: United States
- State: Mississippi
- Counties: Wilkinson, Amite

Highway system
- Mississippi State Highway System; Interstate; US; State

Mississippi Highway 572 (MS 572) is a former state highway in southwestern Mississippi. The route's western terminus was in Centreville of Wilkinson county. MS 572 traveled east and intersected MS 24 and MS 33, just east of the town. It ended at MS 569 south of Beechwood. MS 572 was designated in 1957, from MS 24 and MS 33 to MS 569. The route was extended west to Centreville, and was removed from the state highway system in 1967.

== Route description ==
As of 1965, the route was located in eastern Wilkinson and western Amite counties. All of the route was a two-laned paved road. MS 572 began at the center of Centreville, near a railroad track. The route then traveled down Park Road until it exited Wilkinson County and entered Amite County. After crossing the county line, MS 572 intersected MS 24 and MS 33, and MS 572 was also branded Lower Centreville Road. Continuing eastward, the route exited Centreville and crossed over Beaver Creek and emerged into the village of Olio. MS 572 left Olio, and ended few miles later at MS 569 at a T-intersection. Lower Centreville Road continued east, concurrent with MS 569. MS 572 was maintained by the Mississippi State Highway Commission and Amite County, as part of the state highway system.

== History ==
MS 572 was designated in 1957, connecting from MS 24/33 to MS 569. The route was fully paved when it was created. The next year, it was extended slightly to Centreville. By 1960, a section of the route in Amite County was transferred to county maintenance. MS 572 was removed from the state highway system by 1967. Today, the road is known as Park Road (unsigned Mississippi Highway 946) west of MS 24 and MS 33, and Lower Centreville Road east of it.

== Major intersections ==
The route is documented as it existed in 1965.

County	Location	mi	km	Destinations	Notes
Wilkinson	Centreville	0.0	0.0	Centreville	
Amite	Centreville	0.7	1.1	MS 24 / MS 33	
Amite		10.9	17.5	MS 569	
1.000 mi = 1.609 km; 1.000 km = 0.621 mi

== See also ==
- Mississippi Highway 577
