= National Register of Historic Places listings in Amite County, Mississippi =

Location of Amite County in Mississippi

This is a list of the National Register of Historic Places listings in Amite County, Mississippi.

This is intended to be a complete list of the properties on the National Register of Historic Places in Amite County, Mississippi, United States. Latitude and longitude coordinates are provided for many National Register properties; these locations may be seen together in a map.

There are 19 properties listed on the National Register in the county. Another property was once listed but has been removed.

This National Park Service list is complete through NPS recent listings posted October 23, 2026.

== Current listings ==
	Name on the Register	Image	Date listed	Location	City or town	Description
1	Amite County Courthouse	Amite County Courthouse	April 9, 1974 (#74001055)	Main St. 31°09′27″N 90°48′38″W	Liberty	
2	Amite Female Seminary	Amite Female Seminary	April 17, 1980 (#80002200)	Mississippi Highway 569; 31°09′37″N 90°48′20″W	Liberty	
3	Thomas Batchelor House		March 27, 1975 (#75001040)	5 miles east of Liberty of Olio Rd. 31°02′31″N 90°52′53″W	Liberty	
4	Bethany Institute		August 3, 1978 (#78001588)	East of Centreville on Mississippi Highway 48; 31°05′52″N 90°59′19″W	Centreville vicinity	
5	Bethany Presbyterian Church		June 23, 2003 (#03000553)	Junction of Mississippi Highway 48 and Perry Rd. 31°06′07″N 90°59′11″W	Centreville vicinity	
6	Decatur N. Butler House		May 1, 1984 (#84002113)	Off Mississippi Highway 567; 31°11′46″N 90°49′54″W	Liberty	
7	Felder-Richmond House		July 12, 1984 (#84002115)	Off Interstate 55; 31°08′45″N 90°35′34″W	Magnolia	
8	Hampton Lea House		July 12, 1984 (#84002120)	Lea Rd. 31°06′18″N 90°36′24″W	Magnolia	
9	Wilford Zachariah Lea House	Wilford Zachariah Lea House	October 25, 1995 (#95001181)	Mississippi Highway 569, N., 2 miles north of Liberty; 31°10′48″N 90°46′47″W	Liberty	
10	Liberty Presbyterian Church	Liberty Presbyterian Church	May 16, 1985 (#85001075)	North Church St. 31°09′31″N 90°48′33″W	Liberty	
11	McGehee House		November 25, 1983 (#83003939)	Southeast of Zion Hill; 31°15′04″N 90°47′55″W	Liberty	
12	Theodore L. McGehee Plantation House		March 1, 1996 (#96000189)	5924 Tangipahoa Rd. 31°18′38″N 90°34′20″W	Summit	
13	Pinewood		July 5, 1984 (#84002122)	South of Liberty off Greensburg Rd. 31°02′14″N 90°48′20″W	Liberty	
14	Sherman Line Rosenwald School	Sherman Line Rosenwald School	January 12, 2017 (#100000535)	3021 Sherman Church Rd. 31°08′54″N 90°33′04″W	Magnolia	
15	Sturdivant Fishweir	Sturdivant Fishweir	April 14, 1978 (#78001589)	Address restricted	Rosetta	
16	Sunnyslope		March 22, 1982 (#82003096)	Northeast of Centreville; 31°06′48″N 91°02′25″W	Centreville vicinity	
17	George Webb House		November 17, 1983 (#83003940)	East of Old Zion Hill Rd. 31°11′04″N 90°49′31″W	Liberty	
18	Westbrook Cotton Gin	Westbrook Cotton Gin	November 10, 2010 (#10000903)	395 Gillsburg Rd. 31°09′22″N 90°48′27″W	Liberty	
19	Winston Wilkinson House	Winston Wilkinson House	April 17, 1980 (#80002201)	North of Liberty on Mississippi Highway 567; 31°16′22″N 90°51′02″W	Liberty	

== Former listing ==
	Name on the Register	Image	Date listed	Date removed	Location	City or town	Description
1	Talbert-Cassels House		March 1, 1984 (#84002125)	July 16, 2008	Off Mississippi Highway 574	Gloster vicinity	Destroyed by fire on December 15, 2006

== See also ==
- List of National Historic Landmarks in Mississippi
- National Register of Historic Places listings in Mississippi
