= Mississippi Highway 569 =

Highway in Mississippi

Mississippi Highway 569
- MS 569 highlighted in purple

Route information
- Maintained by MDOT
- Length: 27.645 mi (44.490 km) (31.9 mi (51.3 km) including concurrencies)
- Existed: c. 1955–present
- History: Opened on October 17, 1958

Major junctions
- South end: LA 67 east of Norwood, LA
- MS 24 / MS 48 in Liberty
- North end: US 98 northwest of Summit

Location
- Country: United States
- State: Mississippi
- Counties: Amite, Lincoln

Highway system
- Mississippi State Highway System; Interstate; US; State
← MS 568	→ MS 570

Mississippi Highway 569 (MS 569) is a state highway in southwestern Mississippi. The route starts at the Mississippi–Louisiana state line, and it travels northeastward from that point. It intersects MS 48 southwest of Liberty, and MS 569 becomes concurrent with it. Inside Liberty, MS 569 is also concurrent with MS 24 briefly before travelling northeastward out of the city. It continues through Amite County and it ends at U.S. Route 98 (US 98) in extreme southwestern Lincoln County.

The road was designated in 1955, as part of projects initiated by the Mississippi State Highway Department (MSHD). The route was finished by 1956, and the majority of it was paved by 1958. MS 569 was officially opened in a ceremony in Liberty on October 17, 1958. The road was completely paved by 1960.

== Route description ==
Traffic volume on Mississippi Highway 569
Location	Volume
North of Homer Road	2,900
North of Street Road	1,600
Northeast of Higgins Road	3,100
South of West Borden Avenue	3,400
West of MS 584	7,000
West of Clinic Street	1,700
Northeast of Clark Road	1,000
Northeast of Cutoff Road	830
Northeast of Charles Road	970
Southeast of US 98	840
Data was measured in 2016 in terms of AADT; Source:

The route is located in Amite and Lincoln counties. MS 569 is legally defined in Mississippi Code § 65-3-3, and is maintained by the Mississippi Department of Transportation (MDOT) as part of the state highway system.

MS 569 starts at the Mississippi–Louisiana state line, where it meets the northern terminus of Louisiana Highway 67 (LA 67). The road travels northeastward, intersecting Homer Road and crossing over Beaver Creek. It then intersects Lower Centreville Road, which leads to the unincorporated area of Olio. MS 569 and Lower Centreville Road are briefly concurrent to cross the Mart Branch, and the latter continues eastward. MS 569 then crosses Mill Creek past Banks Road. Travelling through the forest and small tracts of farmland, the road turns north at Street Road. It continues over Shaw and Causey Creeks before meeting MS 48 at a three-way junction at Beechwood.

The route becomes concurrent with MS 48 and both routes travel northeastward towards Liberty. Between the routes' intersection with Enterprise Road, it crosses over Wagoner Creek and West Fork of the Amite River. The road enters Liberty past County Farm Road. MS 48 and 569 bends northward near the center of the town. Known as South Broad Street, the routes intersect West Borden Avenue and Washington Street before meeting MS 24 at a signalized intersection. The Amite County Courthouse is located to the southeast of the intersection. MS 48 and 569 become concurrent with MS 24 and travel eastward. The three routes travel along East Main Street, intersecting some city streets and the northern terminus of MS 584 at Gillsburg Road. Several yards later, MS 569 turns north, ending concurrencies with MS 24 and 48. The road then turns northeastward at Broken Street, and it leaves the city at Tower Hill Road.

The road travels northeastward across multiple creeks and meeting multiple gravel roads through the forest. An incorporated area, Hustler, is located off Rollison Road, which meets MS 569 and Thompson Road. After crossing a branch of East Fork of the Amite River, the route intersects MS 570. MS 569 enters Lincoln County past Branch Road. After crossing the county line, the route ends at US 98. The road continues as Frances Trail Southwest north of US 98.

== History ==
The route was designated in January 1955, as part of new projects announced by MSHD. The project, known as Federal Aid Secondary Project S-0242, included excavation, grading of the road from the Louisiana–Mississippi state line to the community of Beechwood, and building multiple culverts and one bridge. The contract was awarded to W.L. Wells for $314,214 (equivalent to $3,688,209 in 2024) later that month. By 1956, the road appeared on the state map, extending from the state line to Auburn, with a small section near Liberty already paved. MS 569 was extended northward along a paved road to Lucien in Franklin County by 1957. The section from the state line to Beechwood was paved by 1958, with a cost of $69,978.98 (equivalent to $783,450 in 2024). The road from Liberty to Smithdale was paved during 1958 by the Road Builders Construction Company, with a contract worth $72,432. MS 569 was officially opened on October 17, 1958, with a ribbon ceremony in Liberty. By 1960, the state map showed all of the route already paved. The section in Franklin County was removed from the state highway system by 1967.

== Major intersections ==
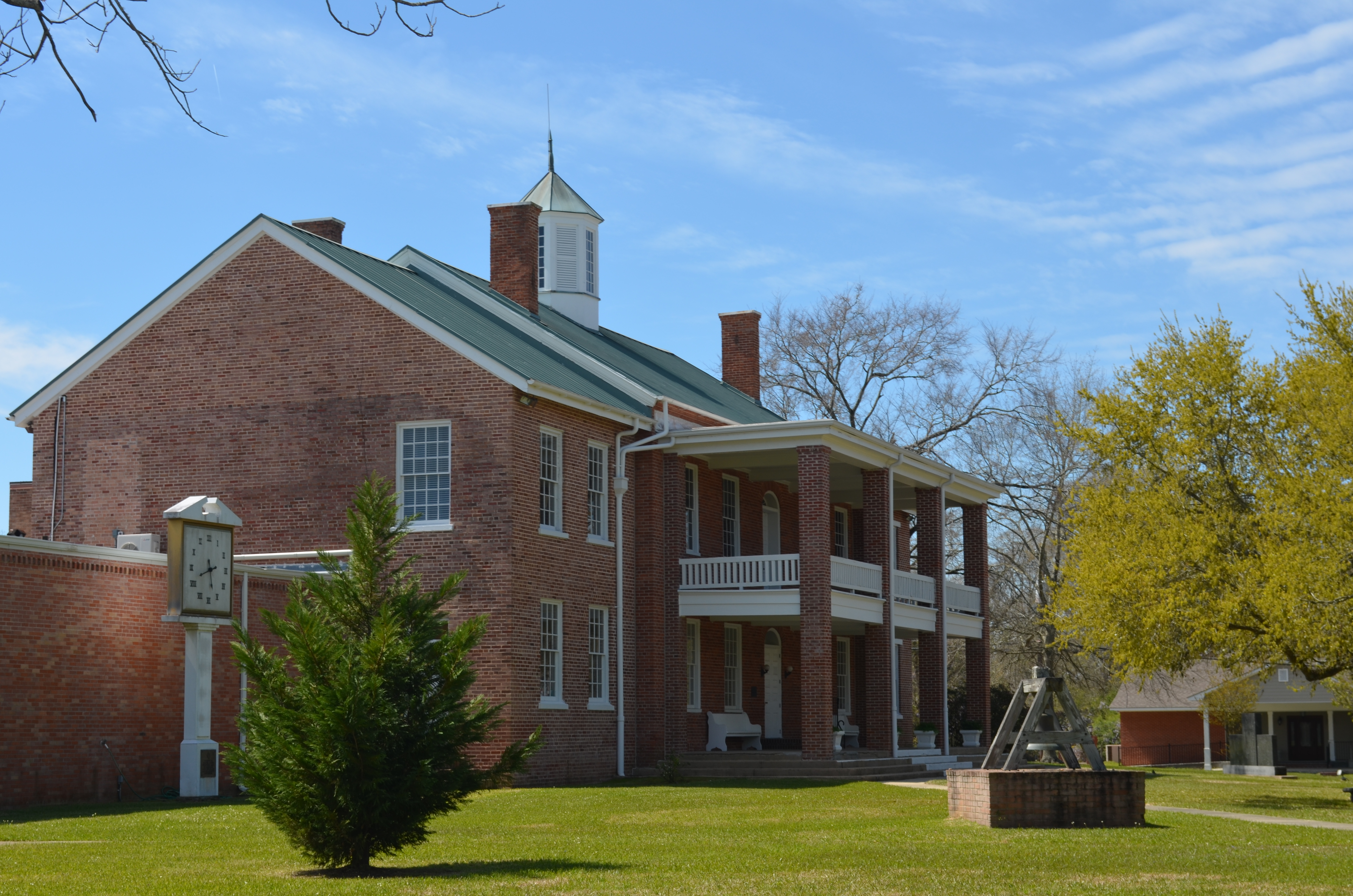
Amite County Courthouse, located at the intersection of MS 24 and MS 48/569.

County	Location	mi	km	Destinations	Notes
Amite		0.0	0.0	LA 67 south – Clinton	Southern terminus; Louisiana state line
Amite		9.6	15.4	MS 48 west – Centreville	Southern end of MS 48 concurrency
Amite	Liberty	13.6	21.9	MS 24 west (Main Street) – Gloster	Southern end of MS 24 concurrency
Amite	Liberty	13.8	22.2	MS 584 east (Gillsburg Road) – Gillsburg, Osyka	Western terminus of MS 584
Amite	Liberty	13.8	22.2	MS 24 east / MS 48 east (Main Street) – McComb	Northern end of MS 24 and MS 48 concurrency
Amite		28.4	45.7	MS 570 – Smithdale, McComb	
Lincoln		31.9	51.3	US 98 – Meadville, Summit	Northern terminus
1.000 mi = 1.609 km; 1.000 km = 0.621 mi: Concurrency terminus

== See also ==
- Mississippi Highway 572 – Now known as Lower Centreville Road
