= Mississippi Highway 24 =

Highway in Mississippi

Mississippi Highway 24
- MS 24 highlighted in red

Route information
- Maintained by MDOT
- Length: 76.0 mi (122.3 km)
- Existed: 1932–present

Major junctions
- West end: Main Street in Fort Adams
- US 61 in Woodville
- East end: I-55 / US 98 in McComb

Location
- Country: United States
- State: Mississippi
- Counties: Wilkinson, Amite, Pike

Highway system
- Mississippi State Highway System; Interstate; US; State
← MS 23	→ MS 25

Mississippi Highway 24 (MS 24) is a state highway in Mississippi, United States. The highway runs 76.0 miles (122.3 km) from Fort Adams east to an interchange with Interstate 55 (I-55) and U.S. Highway 98 (US 98) in McComb. The roadway passes through Wilkinson, Amite, and Pike counties, serving the communities of Woodville, Centreville, Gloster, and Liberty. MS 24 has concurrencies with MS 33 between Centerville and Gloster and MS 48 from Liberty to west of McComb.

MS 24 was designated in 1932 to run from Fort Adams east to Leakesville, following gravel roads across the southern part of the state. Throughout the 1930s and 1940s, much of the route was paved and realigned. The route was extended from Leakesville to the Alabama border in 1953. US 98 replaced the MS 24 designation from McComb to east of McLain in 1955, splitting MS 24 into two segments. The eastern segment was redesignated MS 594 in 1958. The eastern terminus was moved to its current location in 1967, with US 98 replacing the part leading into McComb.

== Route description ==
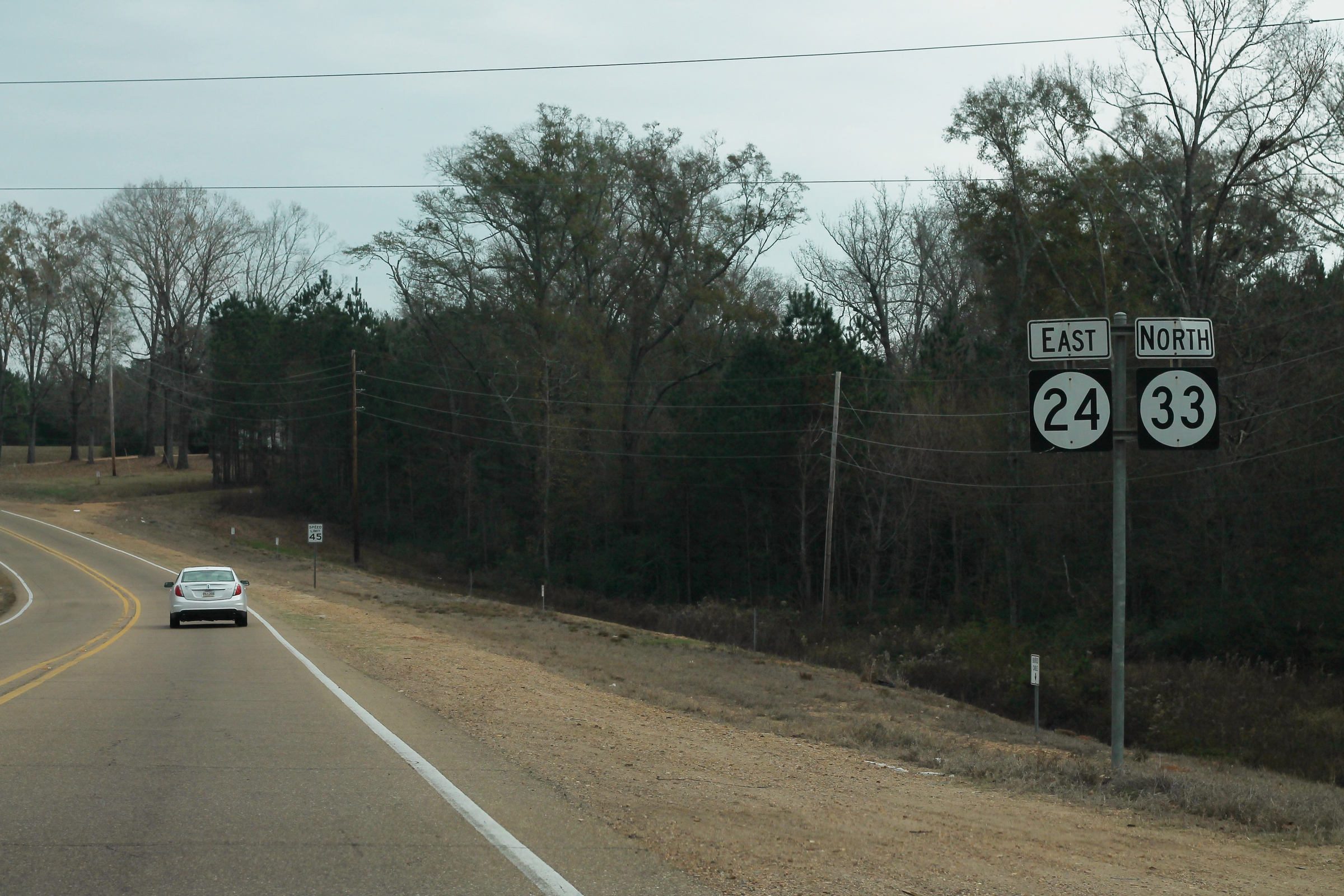
MS 24 along its concurrency (overlap) with MS 33

MS 24 begins at Main Street in Fort Adams, Wilkinson County, heading northeast as a two-lane undivided road. The highway passes through a mix of farmland and woodland before entering dense forests. The road curves to the east and continues through forested areas with some fields and homes. After passing through several miles of rural areas, MS 24 heads into Woodville and runs south through wooded residential neighborhoods. The highway turns east onto Main Street and passes homes before heading through the commercial downtown of Woodville. On the eastern edge of town, the road comes to an intersection with US 61. Past this junction, MS 24 leaves Woodville and becomes an unnamed road that runs southeast through forested areas with some development. The highway curves east and continues through a mix of farm fields and woodland. The road heads through denser areas of forests as it approaches Centreville. At this point, MS 24 bypasses the town to the south and crosses a Gloster Southern Railroad line before it reaches an intersection with MS 33. At this point, MS 33 turns east to form a concurrency with MS 24.

MS 24/MS 33 curves to the northeast and enter Amite County, passing businesses as it bypasses Centreville to the southeast. The road heads into wooded areas and curves north, intersecting the western terminus of MS 48. The highway continues north through a mix of farm fields and woodland; eventually the roadway turns to the northeast. MS 24/MS 33 becomes Captain Gloster Drive as it heads into Gloster. The road passes through wooded areas with some development as it bypasses the center of Gloster to the southeast. MS 33 splits from MS 24 by heading to the north while MS 24 curves east to leave Gloster. The highway continues east-southeast through dense forest for several miles. Farther east, the road heads through a mix of fields and woods, where the name becomes Main Street.

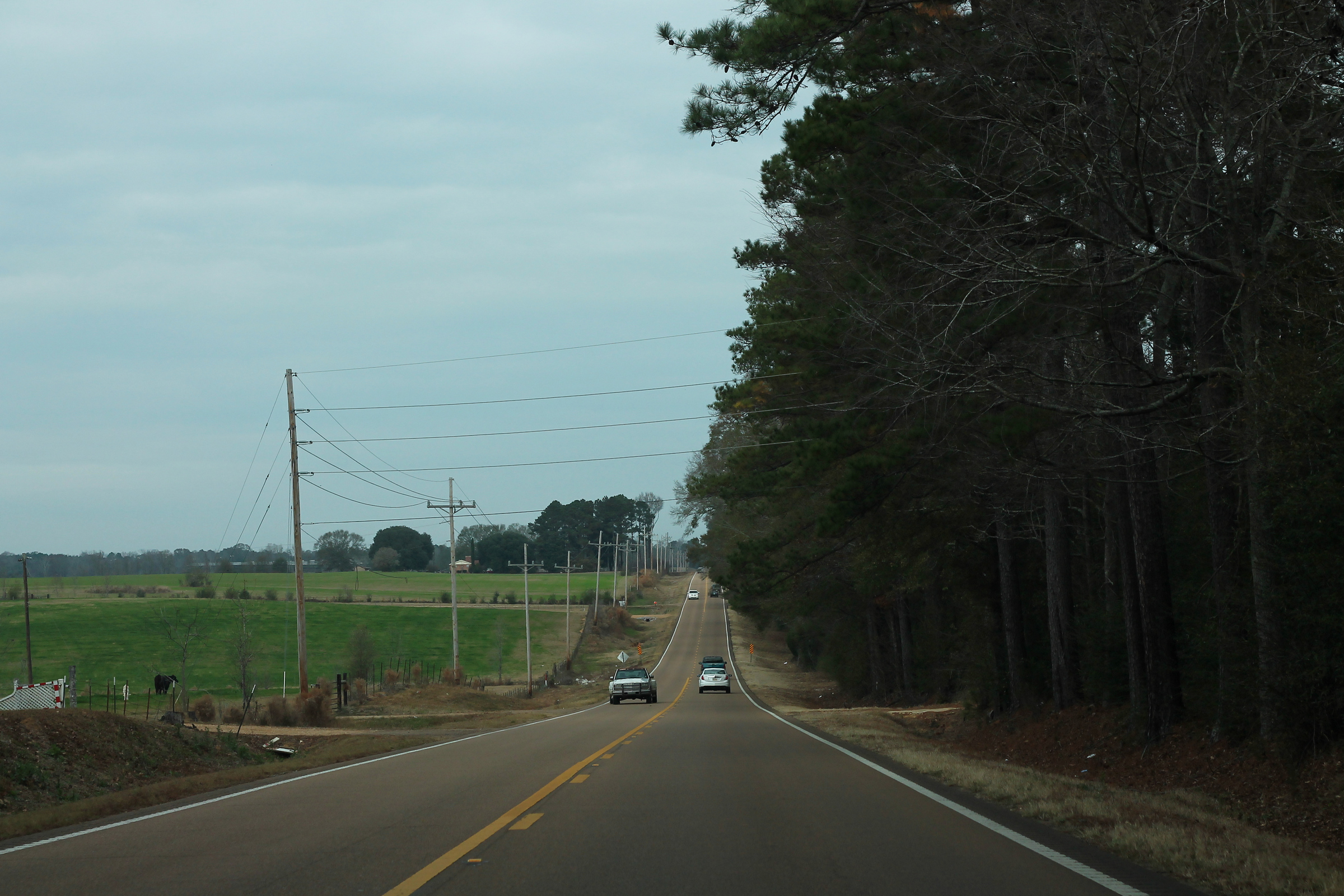
MS 24 eastbound and MS 33 northbound

MS 24 heads east to cross the West Fork of the Amite River into Liberty and intersects the southern terminus of MS 567. The highway passes commercial development and comes to an intersection with MS 48/MS 569. At this intersection, MS 48/MS 569 turn east to join MS 24 on Main Street and the road runs through the commercial downtown of Liberty. The portion of MS 24 which continues east from this point until it reaches McComb has been designated as Jerry Clower highway by Mississippi state statute 65-3-71.23. The highway intersects the western terminus of MS 584 immediately before MS 569 splits from MS 24/MS 48 by heading to the north. Following this, MS 24/MS 48 passes through more residential areas with some businesses before leaving Liberty. The road becomes unnamed and heads through a mix of farmland and woodland with occasional development, where it curves northeast. The highway continues through rural areas for several miles and turns back to the east where it crosses the East Fork of the Amite River. MS 24/MS 48 enters Pike County and passes through more farmland and forests, crossing the Tangipahoa River directly north of Lake Tangipahoa. MS 48 splits from MS 24 by heading to the south. MS 24 continues through rural areas with some businesses before ending at a cloverleaf interchange with I-55/US 98 west of McComb. At this point, the roadway continues east into McComb as part of US 98.

== History ==
By 1928, what would become MS 24 existed as gravel or unimproved roads. MS 24 was designated by 1932 to run from Fort Adams east to MS 63 north of Leakesville; the road went east to McComb before passing through Tylertown, Columbia, Hattiesburg, and New Augusta. At this time, the entire highway was gravel. In 1935, a portion of the road west of Tylertown was paved. A small portion of the road between McCallum and New Augusta was paved a year later. Paving was completed on a part of the highway east of Tylertown in 1939. In 1940, the portions of MS 24 between Foxworth and Columbia and between Beaumont and McLain were paved. That same year, new alignments for the highway were under construction between McComb and Tylertown, from US 49 south of Hattiesburg to Beaumont, and from McLain to Leakesville. In addition, construction was underway to upgrade MS 24 between Columbia and Hattiesburg.

A year later, the highway was paved between Woodville and McComb, from east of Tylertown to Foxworth, and within Lamar County between Columbia and Hattiesburg. In addition, MS 24 was shifted to a new improved alignment from Hattiesburg to west of New Augusta, following a portion of US 49 along with a newly constructed road. In 1943, the new alignment of MS 24 between McComb and Tylertown was completed. Also, the highway was paved between Columbia and the border between Marion County and Lamar County as well as west of New Augusta. In 1944, paving was completed between McLain and Leakesville. A year later, MS 24 was moved to a more direct alignment between Hattiesburg and New Augusta that bypassed Camp Shelby. MS 24 was extended east from Leakesville to the Alabama border in 1953. The same year, a portion of the highway west of Woodville was paved.

In 1955, US 98 replaced the MS 24 designation from US 51 in McComb to east of McLain; as a result, MS 24 was split into two segments. In 1957, the paved portion of MS 24 west of Woodville was extended further to the west. The eastern segment of MS 24 between McLain and the Alabama border was redesignated as MS 594 in 1958. In 1962, the highway was paved to a point east of Fort Adams. Paving was completed on the remainder of MS 24 leading to Fort Adams in 1964. In 1967, the eastern terminus of MS 24 was truncated to its current location at the interchange with I-55; US 98 replaced the route between there and US 51. Since then, MS 24 has remained on the same alignment.

== Major intersections ==
County	Location	mi	km	Destinations	Notes
Wilkinson	Fort Adams	0.0	0.0	Fort Adams Main Street	Western terminus
Wilkinson	Woodville	20.0	32.2	US 61 – Natchez, Baton Rouge	
Wilkinson	Centreville	33.4	53.8	MS 33 south / Camp Street – Baton Rouge, Centreville	West end of MS 33 concurrency
Amite	Centreville	34.4	55.4	East Joseph Street (MS 946 west) – Downtown Centreville	Eastern terminus of unsigned MS 946
Amite		35.7	57.5	MS 48 east / East Howard Street – Liberty, McComb, Centreville	Western terminus of MS 48
Amite	Gloster	42.9	69.0	East Tate Street (MS 911 north) – Downtown Gloster	Southern terminus of unsigned MS 911
Amite	Gloster	43.3	69.7	East Main Street (MS 913 north) – Downtown Gloster	Southern terminus of unsigned MS 913
Amite	Gloster	43.7	70.3	MS 33 north – Crosby	East end of MS 33 concurrency
Amite	Liberty	55.5	89.3	MS 567 north	Southern terminus of MS 567
Amite	Liberty	55.8	89.8	MS 48 west / MS 569 south (South Broad Street) – Centreville	West end of MS 48 / MS 569 concurrency
Amite	Liberty	56.0	90.1	MS 584 east (Gillsburg Road Avenue) – Gillsburg	Western terminus of MS 584
Amite	Liberty	56.1	90.3	MS 569 north (Old Jackson Road)	East end of MS 569 concurrency
Pike		74.4	119.7	MS 48 east – Magnolia, Percy Quin State Park, Quail Hollow Golf Course	East end of MS 48 concurrency
Pike		75.0	120.7	Wardlaw Road (MS 905 east)	Western terminus of unsigned MS 905
Pike	McComb	76.0	122.3	I-55 / US 98 – Tylertown, McComb, Brookhaven, New Orleans	Eastern terminus; I-55 exit 15
1.000 mi = 1.609 km; 1.000 km = 0.621 mi: Concurrency terminus
