= Homochitto =

Homochitto may refer to:

- Homochitto River, a river in Mississippi
- Homochitto, Issaquena County, Mississippi, a plantation in Issaquena County
- Homochitto, Mississippi, an unincorporated community in Amite County
- Homochitto National Forest, a national forest in Mississippi
