= Mississippi Highway 48 =

Highway in Mississippi

Mississippi Highway 48

Route information
- Maintained by MDOT
- Length: 83.6 mi (134.5 km) (64.629 mi excluding concurrencies)
- Existed: 1932–present

Major junctions
- West end: MS 24 / MS 33 in Centreville
- I-55 in Magnolia; US 51 in Magnolia
- East end: MS 35 in Sandy Hook

Location
- Country: United States
- State: Mississippi
- Counties: Amite, Pike, Walthall, Marion

Highway system
- Mississippi State Highway System; Interstate; US; State
← MS 47	→ US 49

Mississippi Highway 48 (MS 48) is a state highway in southern Mississippi. It runs from east to west for 83.6 miles (134.5 km), serving a total of four counties: Marion, Walthall, Pike, and Amite.

== Route description ==
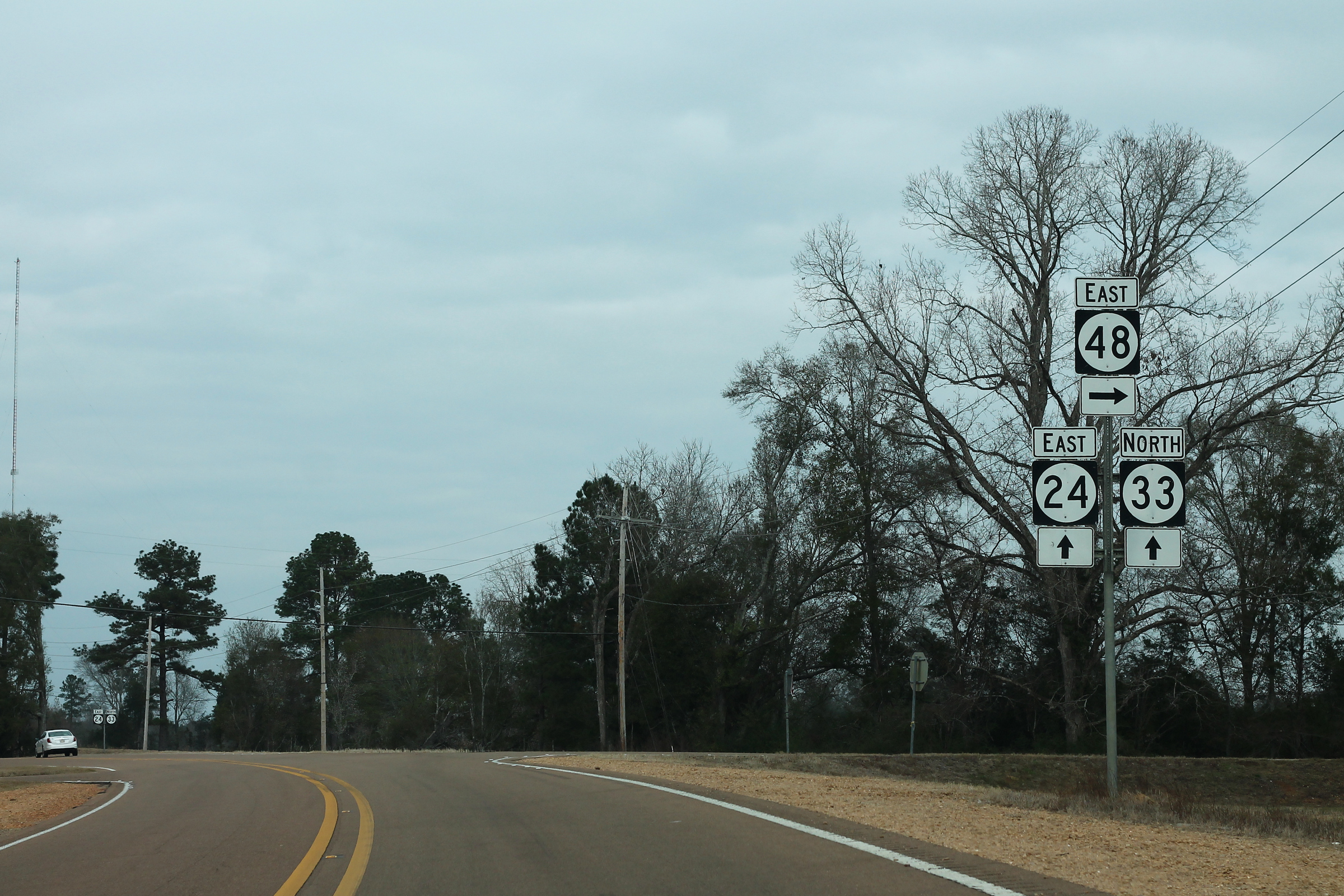
Mississippi Highway 48's western terminus at an intersection with MS 24/MS 33 at the eastern edge of Centreville

MS 48 begins in Amite County in the town of Centreville at an intersection with MS 24/MS 33 at the eastern edge of town, with the road continuing westward as E Howard Street into downtown. It immediately leaves the town and heads east through woodlands, with some farms here and there, for several miles to pass through the community of Ariel and become concurrent (overlapped) with MS 569 before crossing the West Fork of the Amite River and entering the town of Liberty. The highway enters town along S Broad Street, passing through a neighborhood before entering downtown and becoming concurrent with MS 24 (Main Street) at an intersection on the corner of the Amite County Courthouse. MS 24/MS 48/MS 569 head east along Main Street straight the center of the downtown business district, where they have an intersection with MS 584 (Gillsburg Road) and MS 569 splits off (along Old Jackson Road), and MS 24/MS 48 leave downtown and pass through neighborhoods before leaving Liberty and traveling through a mix of farmland and wooded areas for several miles, where they cross the East Fork of the Amite River, before entering Pike County.

MS 24/MS 48 travel through woodlands, where they cross the Tangipahoa River about 1.5 miles north of Lake Tangipahoa, before MS 48 splits and heads south, directly passing through Percy Quin State Park. MS 48 now has a rather large interchange with I-55 (Exit 10) as it curves eastward again to enter the town of Magnolia along Bay Street and pass through some neighborhoods. It enters downtown and has an intersection with US 51 (Clark Avenue) before passing by the Pike County Courthouse and crossing over a railroad track. The highway crosses a bridge over the Little Tangipahoa River to leave Magnolia and travel southeast through mostly farmland for several miles to enter Walthall County.

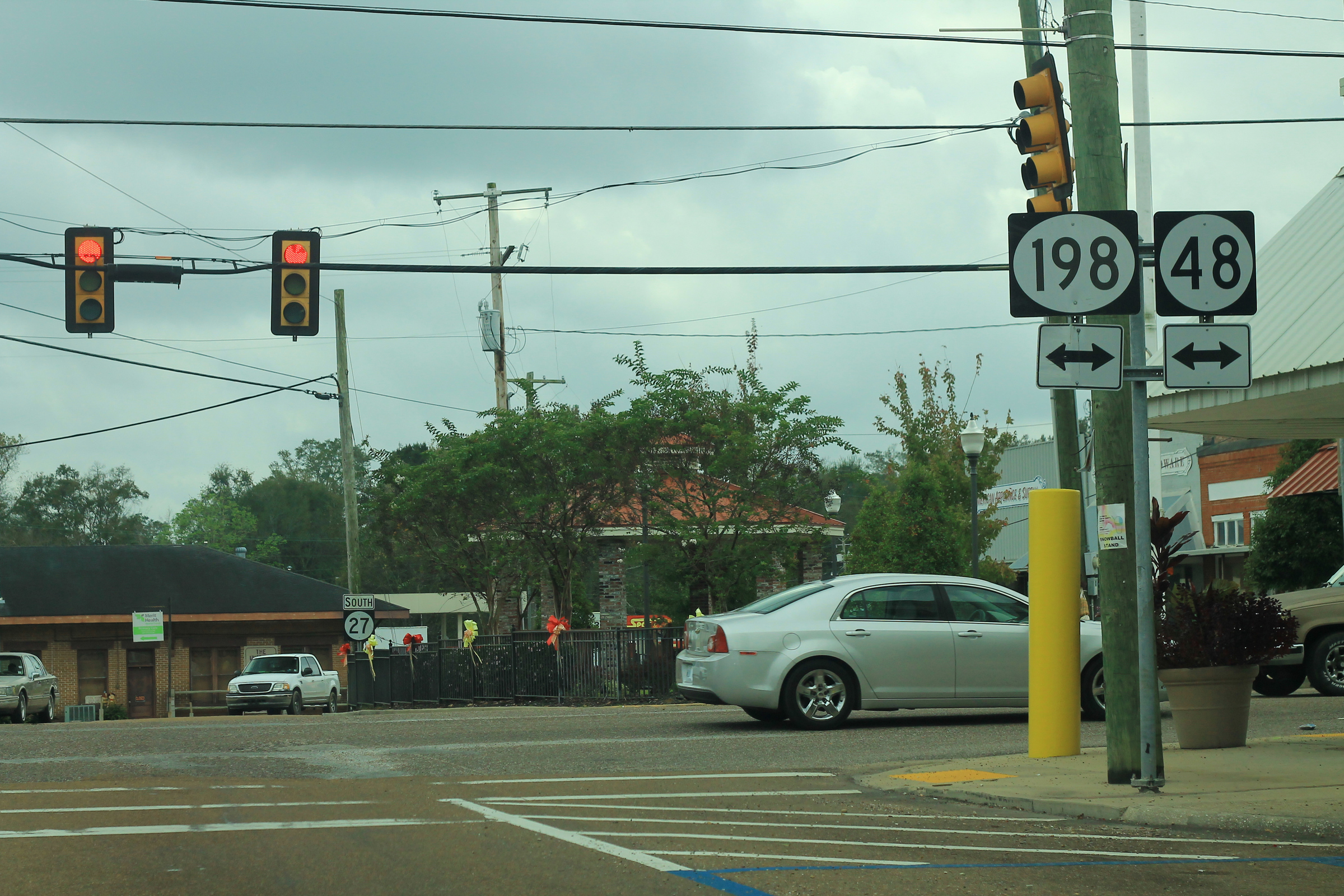
The intersection of MS 27, MS 48, and MS 198 in Tylertown

MS 48 immediately crosses the Bogue Chitto River and travels eastward through more farmland before the Tylertown city limits and becoming concurrent with MS 198. They travel along Beulah Avenue through some neighborhoods for several blocks before entering downtown and having an intersection with MS 27 (Franklinton Street/Ball Avenue) near the Walthall County Courthouse. MS 48/MS 198 continue through downtown for several blocks before leaving and passing through neighborhoods again, where they cross Magees Creek and MS 48 splits off to leave Tylertown and wind its way southeast through farmland for several miles (where it passes through the community of Dexter) to enter Marion County.

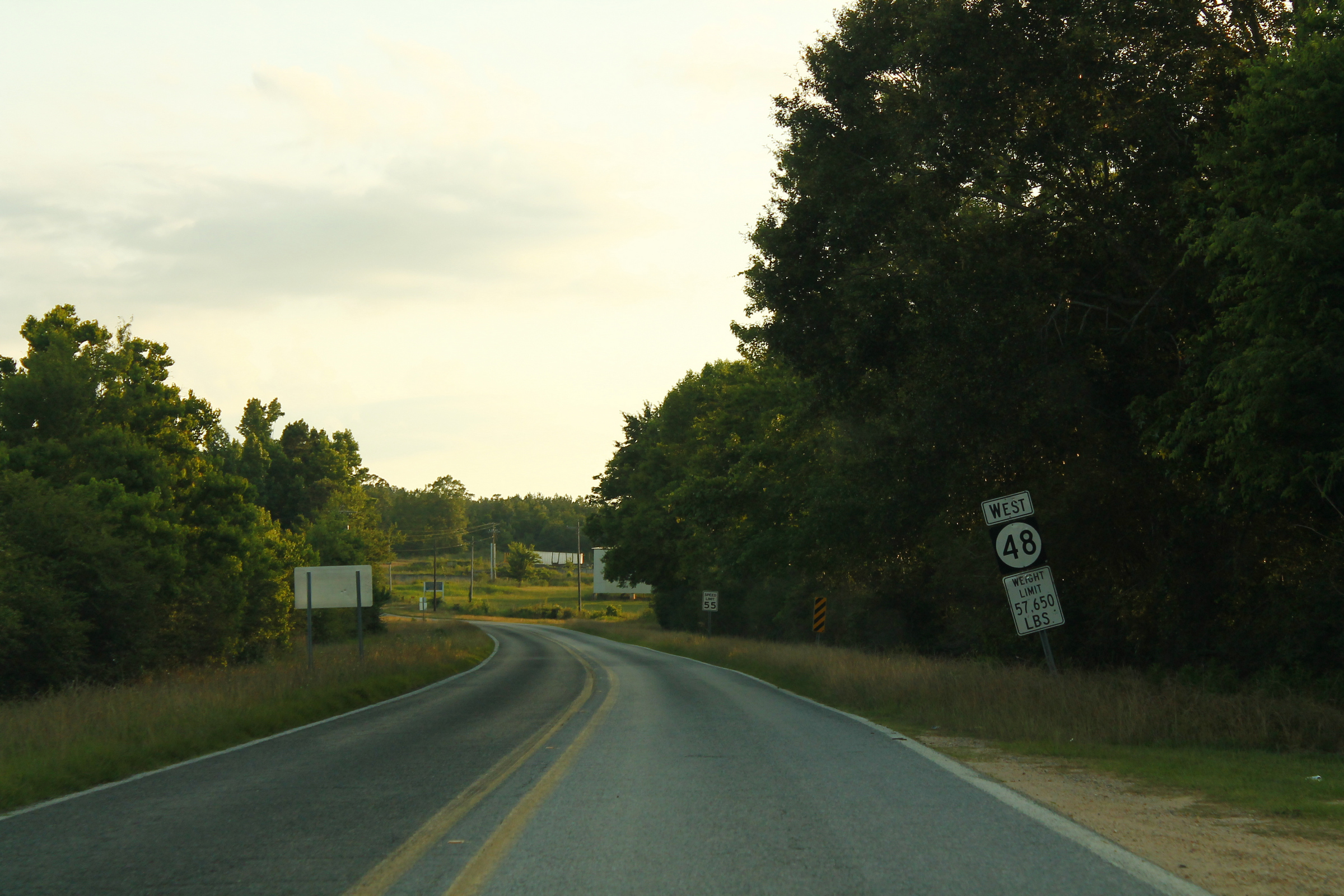
Mississippi Highway 48 looking westbound

MS 48 curves eastward again and travels through woodlands for several miles before coming to an end in the community of Sandy Hook at an intersection with MS 35, only 2.5 miles north of the Louisiana state line by road.

The entire route of Mississippi Highway 48 is a rural two-lane state highway.

== Major intersections ==
County	Location	mi	km	Destinations	Notes
Amite	Centreville	0.0	0.0	MS 24 / MS 33 / East Howard Street – Centreville, Woodville, Baton Rouge	Western terminus
Amite	Beechwood	11.0	17.7	MS 569 south – Baton Rouge	West end of MS 569 overlap
Amite	Liberty	15.0	24.1	MS 24 west (Main Street) – Gloster	West end of MS 24 overlap
Amite	Liberty	15.2	24.5	MS 584 east (Gillsburg Road) – Gillsburg	Western terminus of MS 584
Amite	Liberty	15.3	24.6	MS 569 north (Old Jackson Road)	East end of MS 569 overlap
Pike		33.6	54.1	MS 24 east – McComb	East end of MS 24 overlap
Pike	Magnolia	38.5– 38.9	62.0– 62.6	I-55 / Muddy Springs Road – McComb, New Orleans	I-55 exit 10
Pike	Magnolia	39.9	64.2	US 51 – McComb, Osyka	
Pike	Dykes Crossing	51.3	82.6	MS 575 south – Progress	Northern terminus of MS 575
Walthall	Tylertown	60.0	96.6	MS 198 west (Beulah Avenue) to US 98 – McComb	West end of MS 198 overlap
Walthall	Tylertown	60.8	97.8	MS 27 (Franklinton Street/Ball Avenue) – Monticello, Franklinton	
Walthall	Tylertown	61.6	99.1	MS 198 east (Beulah Avenue) to US 98 – Columbia	East end of MS 198 overlap
Marion	Sandy Hook	83.6	134.5	MS 35 – Sandy Hook, Columbia, Bogalusa	Eastern terminus
1.000 mi = 1.609 km; 1.000 km = 0.621 mi: Concurrency terminus
