= List of state highways in Mississippi (900–999) =

The following is a list of state highways in Mississippi between the numbers 900 and 999.

== MS 902 ==
Mississippi Highway 902
- Length: 4.261 mi (6.857 km)
- Existed: c. 1967–present

Mississippi Highway 902 (MS 902, also known as MS 35 Connector) is a state highway in central Mississippi. The route starts at MS 481 in Burns and it travels northeastwards. It travels within the Bienville National Forest and it ends at MS 35 in Lorena. The road was constructed around 1967 and was paved by 1968. The route was signed as MS 902 on state maps by 1998.

== MS 923 ==
Mississippi Highway 923
- Length: 2.34 mi (3.77 km)
- Existed: 1963–

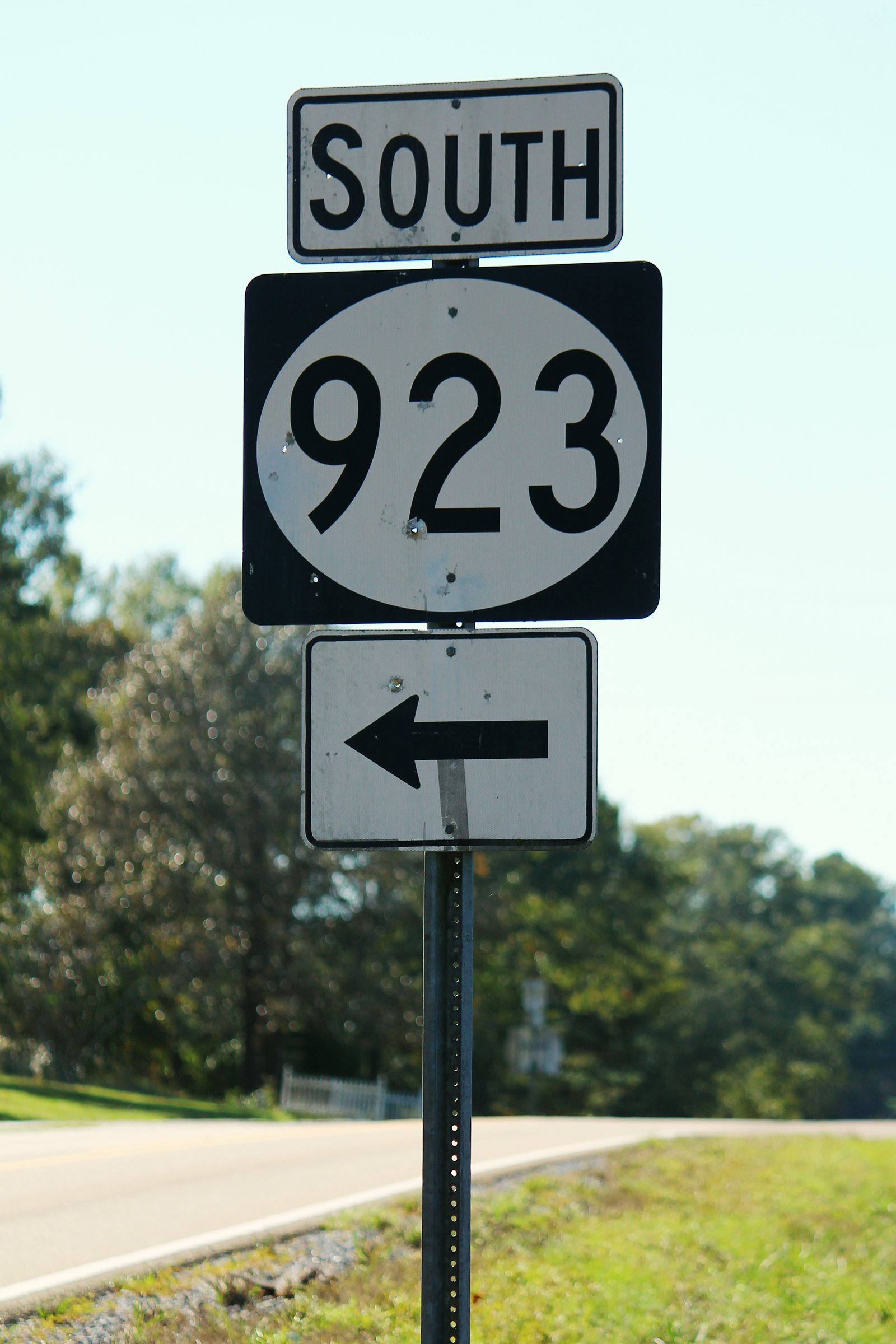
MS 584 at its intersection with MS 923

Mississippi Highway 923 (MS 923, also known as MS 584 Spur) is a state highway in southeastern Amite County, Mississippi, United States. The route starts at Louisiana Highway 1053 (LA 1053) on the Louisiana–Mississippi state border and begins traveling northwest. MS 923 ends at MS 584 and continues as P.P. Wilson Road. The route was designated in 1963, after the Mississippi Department of Transportation (MDOT) took over maintenance of the road.

All of MS 923 is located in Amite County. In 2018, MDOT calculated 240 vehicles traveling on MS 923 north of Line Creek Road on average each day. The road is legally defined in Mississippi Code § 65-3-3, as both MS 923 and MS 584 Spur, but it is signed as MS 923. The route is maintained by MDOT as part of the Mississippi State Highway System.

MS 923 begins at the Louisiana–Mississippi state line at the northern terminus of LA 1053. The route travels northward until it intersects Line Creek Road, where it turns northwest. The road travels through a rural part of Amite County, with forests to the west of the route and farmland to the east. MS 923 ends at its intersection with MS 584, and the road continues as P.P. Wilson Road.

In 1963, the route of MS 923 was accepted for maintenance by MDOT, and it was paved afterwards. The road was shown on the state highway map by 1964.

== MS 992 ==
Mississippi Highway 43 Spur
- Location: Picayune
- Length: 1.350 mi (2.173 km)

MS 43 Spur, officially inventoried as Mississippi Highway 992 (MS 992), is a short local road which runs through Picayune, Mississippi. Its northern terminus is at MS 43 and its southern terminus is just north of Goodyear Boulevard in Picayune.
