= Ray Poole =

American football player (1921–2008)

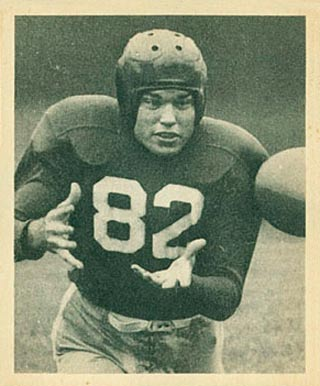
- Poole on a 1948 Bowman football card

No. 82, 79
- Positions: Defensive end, end

Personal information
- Born: April 15, 1921; Gloster, Mississippi, U.S.
- Died: April 2, 2008 (aged 86); Oxford, Mississippi, U.S.
- Listed height: 6 ft 2 in (1.88 m)
- Listed weight: 215 lb (98 kg)

Career information
- College: North Carolina; Mississippi
- NFL draft: 1944: 13th round, 125th overall pick

Career history
- New York Giants (1947–1952); Montreal Alouettes (1953-1954)

Awards and highlights
- Pro Bowl (1950); Third-team All-American (1946); First-team All-SEC (1946)

Career NFL statistics
- Receptions: 83
- Receiving yards: 1,164
- Total touchdowns: 9
- Fumble recoveries: 11
- Interceptions: 3
- Stats at Pro Football Reference

Ray Smith Poole (April 15, 1921 – April 2, 2008) was an American professional football player who was an offensive and defensive end for the New York Giants of the National Football League (NFL) from 1947 to 1952.

Born in Gloster, Mississippi, he graduated from Crosby High School in Crosby, Mississippi, then attended the University of North Carolina before transferring to the University of Mississippi. He also played baseball and basketball at Ole Miss, where his brothers Barney and Buster also became star athletes. Ray Poole was selected by the Giants in the 13th round of the 1944 NFL draft while he was serving three years in the Marines during World War II. He returned to play at Ole Miss before joining the NFL. He was named to the all-NFL team in 1950.

He later played for the Montreal Alouettes of the Canadian Football League in 1953–54, and then became an assistant coach at Ole Miss under coach Johnny Vaught. He coached at Ole Miss from 1955 to 1974, then served as head coach at Northwest Mississippi Community College for the 1979 and 1980 seasons.

Poole died of cancer at age 86.
