= Mississippi Highway 584 =

Highway in Mississippi

Mississippi Highway 584
- MS 584 highlighted in red

Route information
- Maintained by MDOT
- Length: 25.335 mi (40.773 km)

Major junctions
- West end: MS 48 / MS 24 / MS 569 in Liberty
- I-55 near Osyka
- East end: US 51 in Osyka

Location
- Country: United States
- State: Mississippi
- Counties: Amite, Pike

Highway system
- Mississippi State Highway System; Interstate; US; State
← MS 583	→ MS 585

Mississippi Highway 584 (MS 584) is a 25.1-mile-long (40.4 km) state highway in Amite and Pike counties of southern Mississippi, United States. It connects the towns of Liberty and Osyka via Gillsburg.

== Route description ==
MS 584 begins in Amite County in downtown Liberty at an intersection with MS 24/MS 48/MS 569 (Main Street). It heads south through neighborhoods along Gillsburg Road before turning east along Osyka Road to leave Liberty and continue southeast through a mix of farmland and wooded areas for the next several miles, where it crosses a bridge over the East Fork Amite River. The highway then passes through Gillsburg, where it has an intersection with MS 568 and crosses a bridge over the Tickfaw River. MS 584 continues east through rural areas for several miles, where it has it has intersections with MS 571 and MS 923 and comes very close to the Louisiana border, in some areas within less than a mile. It now crosses into Pike County and has an interchange with Interstate 55 (I-55) at its exit 1 shortly before entering Osyka. MS 584 enters the town along Liberty Street and passes southeast through neighborhoods before coming to an end at an intersection with U.S. Route 51 (US 51), just northwest of downtown. The entire route of MS 584 is a two-lane highway.

== Major intersections ==
County	Location	mi	km	Destinations	Notes
Amite	Liberty	0.000	0.000	MS 24 / MS 48 / MS 569 (Main Street)	Western terminus
Amite	Gillsburg	13.852	22.293	MS 568 – Magnolia	
Amite		14.733	23.710	MS 571 south	Northern terminus of MS 571
Amite		19.278	31.025	MS 923 south / P P Wilson Road	Northern terminus of MS 923
Pike		23.329– 23.520	37.544– 37.852	I-55 – McComb, Hammond, New Orleans	I-55 exit 1
Pike	Osyka	25.335	40.773	US 51 (Second Street) / Liberty Street – Kentwood, LA, Magnolia	Eastern terminus
1.000 mi = 1.609 km; 1.000 km = 0.621 mi
