= Drury Wall =

American politician

Member of the Mississippi House of Representatives from the Amite County district
- In office January 1916 – January 1920

Personal details
- Born: February 15, 1874 Gillsburg, Mississippi
- Died: February 17, 1953 (aged 79) McComb, Mississippi
- Party: Democrat

Drury Joseph Wall, Jr. (February 15, 1874 – February 17, 1953) was a Democratic member of the Mississippi House of Representatives, representing Amite County, from 1916 to 1920.

== Biography ==
Drury Joseph Wall, Junior was born on February 15, 1874, in Gillsburg, Amite County, Mississippi. His parents were Drury William Wall and Martha Jane (Tate) Wall. He is related to Mississippi state senator John Wall, who represented Amite County from 1837 to 1846. He married Ruby Hughes in 1894. From 1907 to 1912, he was the Justice of the Peace of Amite County. He was the Registrar of Vital Statistics of Amite County from 1912 to 1916. He was elected to the Mississippi House of Representatives as a Democrat in 1915, for the 1916–1920 term. He died on February 17, 1953, at his son's home in McComb, Mississippi.
