= Elysian Fields, Mississippi =

Elysian Fields
- Ghost town
- Location within Mississippi
- Coordinates: 31°05′21″N 91°01′30″W
- Country: United States
- State: Mississippi
- County: Amite
- Elevation: 315 ft (96 m)
- Time zone: UTC-6 (Central (CST))
  - Summer (DST): UTC-5 (CDT)
- GNIS feature ID: 685256

Elysian Fields is a ghost town in Amite County, Mississippi, United States.

Established in the early 18th century, the settlement today is uninhabited and covered by forest.

== History ==
Elysian Fields was located approximately 2.5 mi (4.0 km) east of the present city of Centreville. The settlement began in 1718 as a rest station along a pioneer trail and pony mail route.

The Spanish established a trading post at Elysian Fields in 1781, and used the site until 1789 as a place where land grants were provided to settlers arriving from the eastern American states. After Spanish rule ended in 1798, Elysian Fields became the location of the Amite County courthouse, and the town was sometimes referred to as "Amite Courthouse".

Settlers began to populate the town, and erected the New Providence Baptist Church in 1804, and the Midway Methodist Church in 1817. An auxiliary branch of the American Bible Society was established in 1823, and a post office was built in 1824.

A gazetteer from 1838 described Amite County's "chief towns" as Liberty, Centreville and Elysian Fields.

Elysian Fields relocated to Centreville in 1883 after the Yazoo and Mississippi Valley Railroad was constructed there. The former site of Elysian Fields, then called "Old Centreville", soon became extinct.
