= Coles, Mississippi =

- Unincorporated community
- Location within Mississippi Location within the United States
- Coordinates: 31°16′39″N 91°01′54″W
- Country: United States
- State: Mississippi
- County: Amite
- Elevation: 243 ft (74 m)
- Time zone: UTC-6 (Central (CST))
  - Summer (DST): UTC-5 (CDT)
- ZIP code: 39633
- Area code: 601
- GNIS feature ID: 692944

Coles is an unincorporated community located in Amite County, Mississippi, United States. Coles is approximately 5.6 miles (9.0 km) north of Gloster on Mississippi Highway 33 and a part of the McComb, Mississippi Micropolitan Statistical Area.

Coles has a zip code that is 39633.
