= Lee Robinson (American football) =

American football player (born 1987)

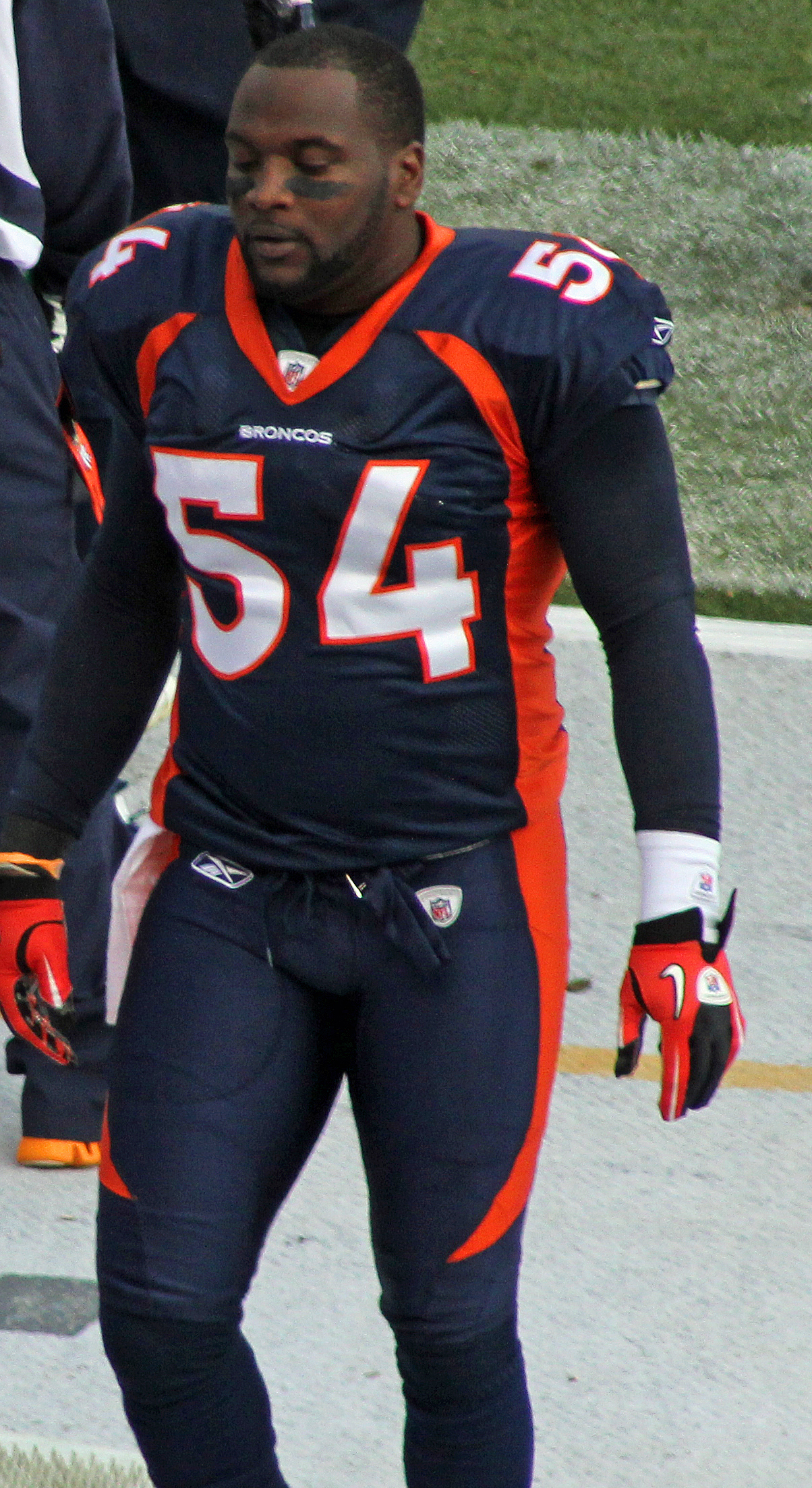
- Robinson in 2010.

No. 54
- Position: Linebacker

Personal information
- Born: April 23, 1987 (age 39); Gloster, Mississippi, U.S.
- Listed height: 6 ft 2 in (1.88 m)
- Listed weight: 253 lb (115 kg)

Career information
- High school: Amite County (Liberty, Mississippi)
- College: Alcorn State
- NFL draft: 2009: undrafted

Career history
- Denver Broncos (2009)*; Arizona Cardinals (2009)*; Tampa Bay Buccaneers (2009–2010)*; Denver Broncos (2010); Edmonton Eskimos (2011–2012); Miami Dolphins (2013)*
- * Offseason or practice squad member only

Awards and highlights
- All-SWAC (2008)

Career NFL statistics
- Tackles: 4
- Stats at Pro Football Reference

Lee Robinson (born April 23, 1987) is an American former professional football player who was a linebacker in the National Football League (NFL) and Canadian Football League (CFL). He played college football for the Alcorn State Braves and was signed by the Denver Broncos as an undrafted free agent in 2009.

Robinson was also a member of the Arizona Cardinals and Tampa Bay Buccaneers and Miami Dolphins.

After a career in football he started working for Transocean as a rstb moved up to a roughneck.

== College career ==
A two-star prospect out of Amite County High School, Robinson chose Alcorn State over Louisiana-Monroe.

== Professional career ==
=== Denver Broncos ===
Robinson went undrafted in the 2009 NFL draft but was later signed by the Denver Broncos on April 26, 2009. He was waived on September 4, 2009.

=== Arizona Cardinals ===
Robinson was signed to the Arizona Cardinals practice squad from September 6, 2009, to October 21, 2009.

=== Tampa Bay Buccaneers ===
Robinson was signed to the Tampa Bay Buccaneers practice squad on October 27. After his contract expired following the season, the Buccaneers re-signed Robinson on January 5, 2010.

He was waived on September 4, 2010, during final cuts but was re-signed to the practice squad the following day. Robinson was released from the practice squad on September 17.

=== Return to Denver Broncos ===
Robinson was signed back by the Denver Broncos to the practice squad. He was promoted to the roster on December 7, but was placed on injured reserves on December 29.

=== Edmonton Eskimos ===
In 2011, Robinson signed with the Edmonton Eskimos of the Canadian Football League. In the two seasons he played for the Eskimos, he recorded a total of six tackles and two sacks.

=== Miami Dolphins ===
On February 14, 2013, Robinson was signed by the Miami Dolphins. Miami released him on September 1, prior to the start of the regular season.
