= Amite County, Mississippi =

County in Mississippi, United States

- County
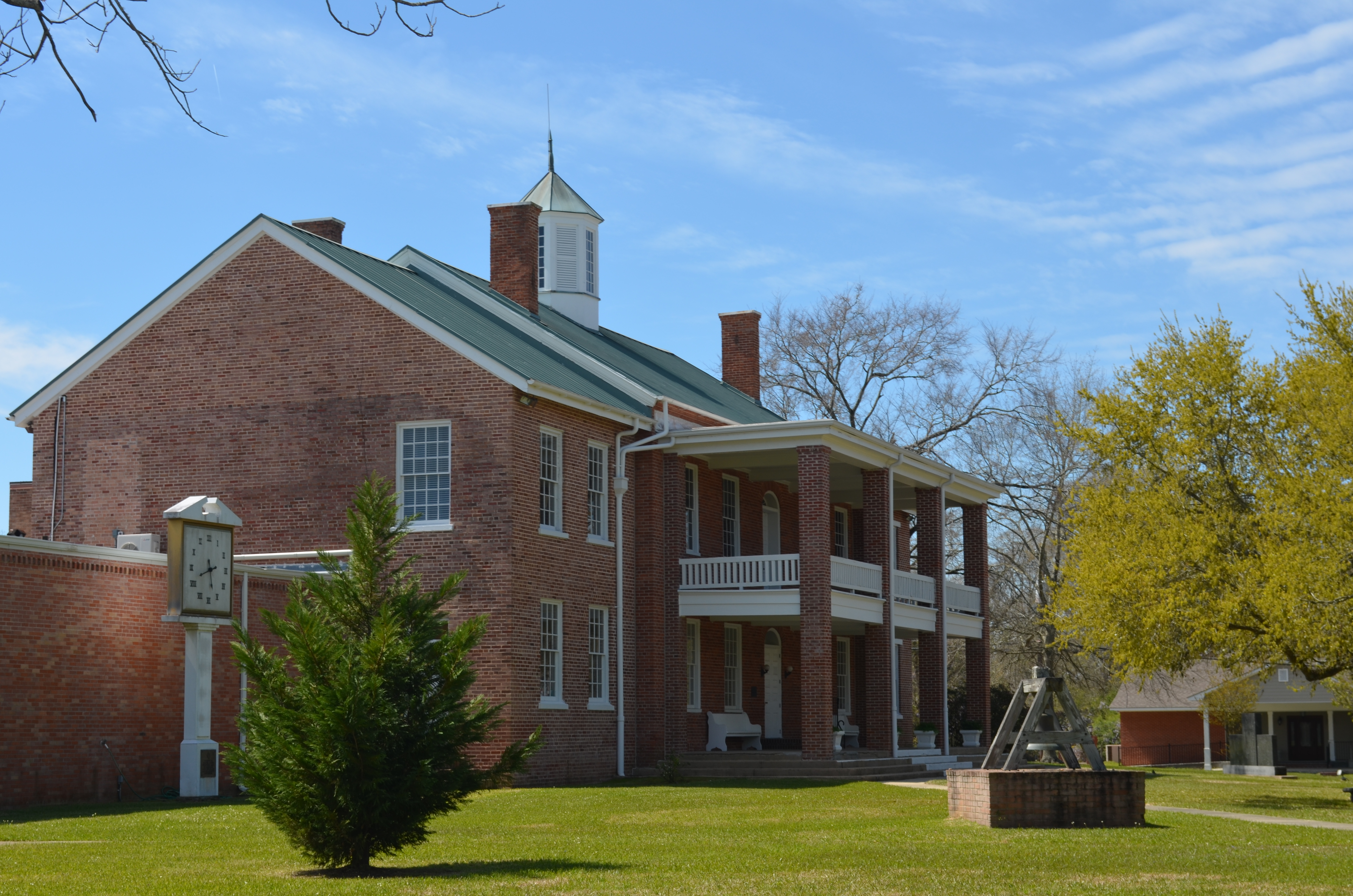
- Amite County Courthouse in Liberty

- Location within the U.S. state of Mississippi
- Coordinates: 31°10′N 90°48′W
- Country: United States
- State: Mississippi
- Founded: 1809
- Named for: Amite River
- Seat: Liberty
- Largest town: Gloster

Area
  - Total: 736 sq mi (1,910 km^{2})
  - Land: 730 sq mi (1,900 km^{2})
  - Water: 1.5 sq mi (3.9 km^{2}) 0.2%

Population (2020)
  - Total: 12,720
  - Estimate (2025): 12,487 ▼
  - Density: 17/sq mi (6.7/km^{2})
- Time zone: UTC−6 (Central)
  - Summer (DST): UTC−5 (CDT)
- Congressional district: 2nd
- Website: www.amitecounty.ms

Amite County /ˈeɪ.mɛt/ is a county located in the state of Mississippi on its southern border with Louisiana. As of the 2020 census, the population was 12,720. Its county seat is Liberty. The county is named after the Amite River, which runs through the county. Amite County is part of the McComb, MS micropolitan statistical area.

== History ==
Amite County was established in February 1809 from the eastern portion of Wilkinson County. It was named after the Amite River. French explorers had named the latter for the friendly (amitié in French) indigenous Houma people they encountered in the region.

The legislation that established the county authorized the appointment of five commissioners to find a site for the county seat, near the county's center and near a good spring; its name was to be Liberty. At this time, the total population of the county numbered about 4000 people, about 80% of whom were middle-class families of seventeenth-century Virginia stock who had gradually migrated through other frontier states. Primary religious groups were all Protestant, including Baptists, Presbyterians, and Methodists.

Completed in 1840, the courthouse in Liberty is the oldest courthouse in Mississippi in continuous use. Liberty eventually became the county's justice and business center. The county economy was based on timber from longleaf pine and the cultivation of commodity crops of cotton, indigo, and tobacco, usually on plantations worked by enslaved African Americans. Given the reliance of planters on labor-intensive crops such as tobacco and cotton, the county soon had a majority population of enslaved African Americans. Even in the antebellum period, the county seat attracted entertainers and lecturers on tour. In the 1850s, Liberty hosted opera singer Jenny Lind, known as the "Swedish Nightingale," at the Walsh building.

In 1861, the state legislature called a convention to vote on secession from the United States. David Hurst, the delegate from Amite County, voted against secession, but the majority of the state's delegates voted for it. Led by South Carolina, the largest slave-owning states were the first in the South to secede. Mississippi voted to join the Confederate States of America. During the Civil War, Captain George H. Tichenor married Margaret Anne Drane at the Liberty Baptist Church; Tichenor developed an antiseptic to treat wounds suffered by soldiers in the war. By the end of the war, 279 men from Amite County had died for the Confederate cause. Amite County was not in a theater of war.

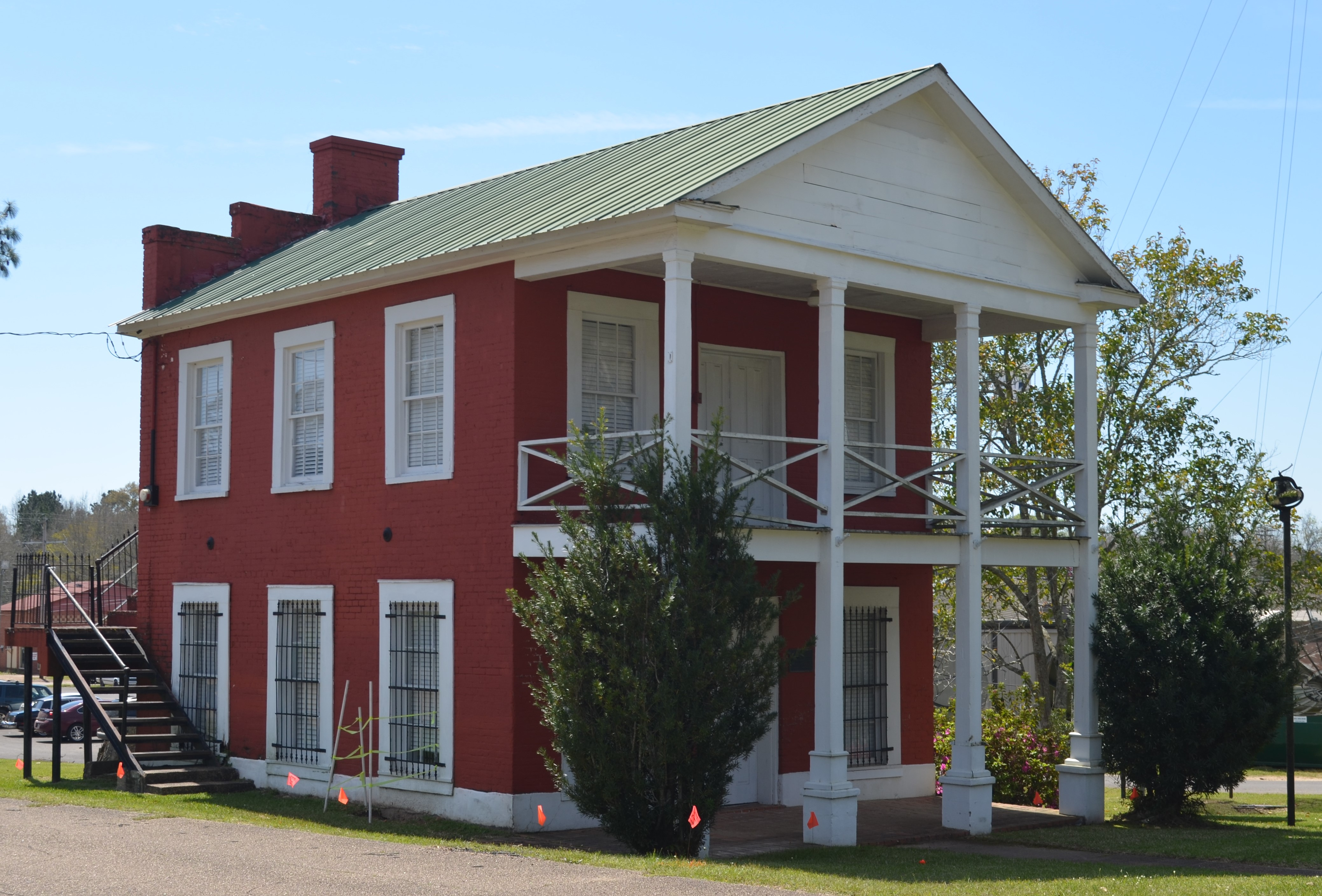
Amite Female Seminary, commonly known as the "Little Red Schoolhouse," established in 1853

A raiding party of Union cavalry, under the command of Colonel Benjamin Grierson, is known to have camped in the county nine miles east of Liberty on the evening of April 28, 1863, while conducting a deep penetration raid as part of the Vicksburg Campaign. As part of that raid, Union forces pillaged many homes and plantations. Most of the buildings of the Amite Female Seminary, with 13 pianos, were burnt; one building was spared, the small Mary Van Norman Ratcliff Building, commonly known as the "Little Red Schoolhouse."

At the end of the Civil War, Amite County's population was 60% African American. During Reconstruction, freedmen elected several African Americans to local office as county sheriff. After Reconstruction, white Democrats regained power in the state legislature through a combination of violent voter repression and fraud. They disenfranchised most African Americans and many poor whites in the state by the new 1890 state constitution, which imposed a poll tax, literacy tests, and other requirements as barriers to voter registration. These were administered by whites in a discriminatory way. Most black voters and many poor whites were dropped from the voter rolls.

=== 20th century to present ===
Racial violence, including lynchings, escalated during the Jim Crow years. The county had 14 documented lynchings in the period from 1877 to 1950; most took place around the turn of the century when disenfranchisement and imposition of Jim Crow was underway.

Blacks were excluded from the political process in the county and state until the late 1960s. African Americans were a majority in the state until the 1930s but excluded from voting, they were also excluded from juries and the entire political system.

The county continued to be based on agriculture, with cotton the basis of the economy into the 1930s. A boll weevil invasion damaged many cotton crops. Planters shifted to logging and dairy farming in the 1930s, during the Great Depression.

As agriculture was mechanized, reducing the need for farm labor, many blacks left Amite County during the first half of the 20th century in two waves of the Great Migration. In the first wave, before World War II, many moved north to Chicago and other industrial cities of the Midwest. In the second wave, they moved to the West Coast, where the burgeoning defense industry created jobs before, during, and after the war. From 1940 to 1960, the county population declined by 29%, as can be seen on the census tables below. Some rural whites also left the county for industrialized cities.

In the 1950s, local farmer E.W. Steptoe founded a chapter of the National Association for the Advancement of Colored People (NAACP) in the county. Herbert Lee, a married farmer with nine children, was among its charter members. They were working to regain constitutional civil rights, including the ability to vote. In the summer of 1961, Bob Moses from the Student Nonviolent Coordinating Committee worked in the county to organize African Americans for voter registration. He was beaten by Bill Caston, a cousin to the sheriff, near the county courthouse, and arrested. He was told to leave the county for his own safety. In the 1960s, only one African American of the total of 5,500 in Amite County was a registered voter. Even after the Voting Rights Act was passed in 1965, extensive grassroots efforts were required to register eligible voters.

Racial violence against blacks in the county escalated during the years of the Civil Rights Movement. On September 25, 1961, at the Westbrook Cotton Gin, about a dozen witnesses, both white and black, saw E.H. Hurst, a white state legislator, murder Herbert Lee in broad daylight. At the inquest that day, Hurst claimed self-defense and witnesses, intimidated by the armed white men in the courtroom, supported him. Learning that the federal government might hold a grand jury in the case, Louis Allen, an African-American veteran of World War II and witness to Lee's murder, talked to the FBI to try to gain protection if he were to testify truthfully to what he saw. They said they could not help him. Whites suspected he had talked with the FBI and began to harass him.

Allen's business was boycotted by whites, and the veteran was beaten and arrested more than once by the county sheriff. He stayed in the area to help his aging parents, but planned to leave. On January 31, 1964, he was shot and killed on his land. No one was ever prosecuted for Allen's death. Investigations since 1994 suggest that Allen was killed by Daniel (Danny) Jones, the county sheriff and son of the Ku Klux Klan's leader in the county. Danny Jones was featured as a likely perpetrator in the Allen case in a 2011 episode of 60 Minutes focusing on civil rights cold cases, but he denied an interview. He died in 2013.

Following the repression of the civil rights era and a continuing poor economy, younger African Americans continued to leave the county, seeking jobs in bigger cities. The population declined more than 11 percent from 1960 to 1970, and further declines occurred to 1980 (see census tables below.) Because of the murders of Lee and Allen, voter registration efforts had stopped in the early 1960s. African Americans did not register until after passage of the Voting Rights Act of 1965, which provided federal protection and oversight. Today the county is majority white in population.

On October 20, 1977, a rental plane carrying members of the band Lynyrd Skynyrd from Greenville, South Carolina, to LSU in Baton Rouge, Louisiana, was low on fuel and crashed in a swamp in Amite County.

Noted historic sites listed on the National Register of Historic Places include the Amite County Courthouse and the Westbrook Cotton Gin, the only one surviving of seven in the county. In addition, 19th-century plantation houses and the Liberty and Bethany Presbyterian churches are listed on the Register.

== Geography ==
According to the U.S. Census Bureau, the county has a total area of 732 square miles (1,900 km^{2}), of which 730 square miles (1,900 km^{2}) is land and 1.5 square miles (3.9 km^{2}) (0.2%) is water.

=== Major highways ===
- U.S. Highway 98
- Mississippi Highway 24
- Mississippi Highway 33
- Mississippi Highway 48
- Mississippi Highway 569
- Mississippi Highway 570
- Mississippi Highway 567
- Mississippi Highway 568
- Mississippi Highway 571
- Mississippi Highway 584

=== Adjacent counties ===
- Franklin County (north)
- Lincoln County (northeast)
- Pike County (east)
- Tangipahoa Parish, Louisiana (southeast)
- St. Helena Parish, Louisiana (south)
- East Feliciana Parish, Louisiana (southwest)
- Wilkinson County (west)

=== National protected area ===
- Homochitto National Forest (part)

=== State protected area ===
- Ethel Stratton Vance Natural Area

=== Flora and fauna ===
The flora of Amite County includes about 1000 species of vascular plants.

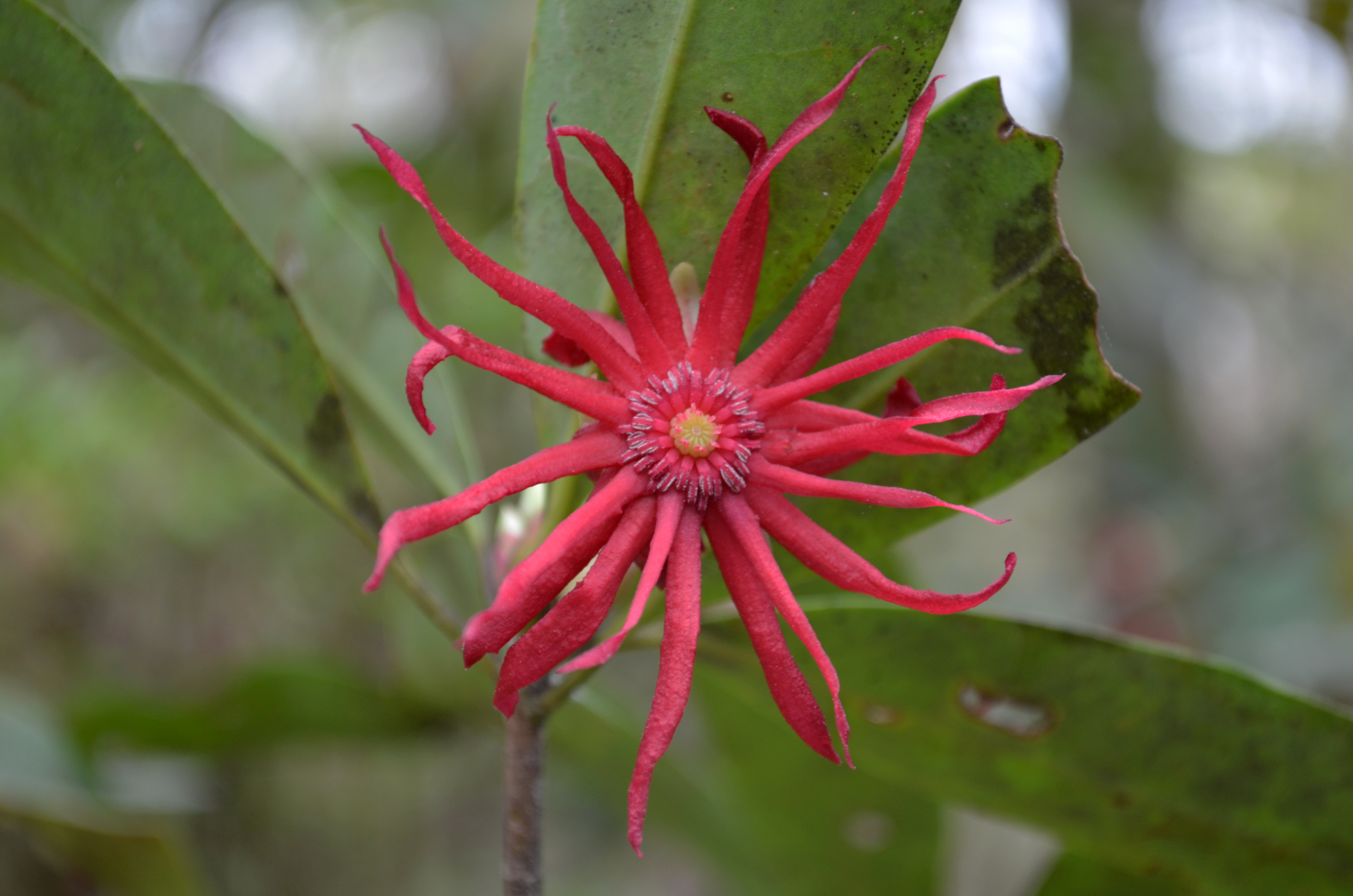
Illicium floridanum, Florida anise or stinkbush, a plant species endemic to the southeastern U.S.

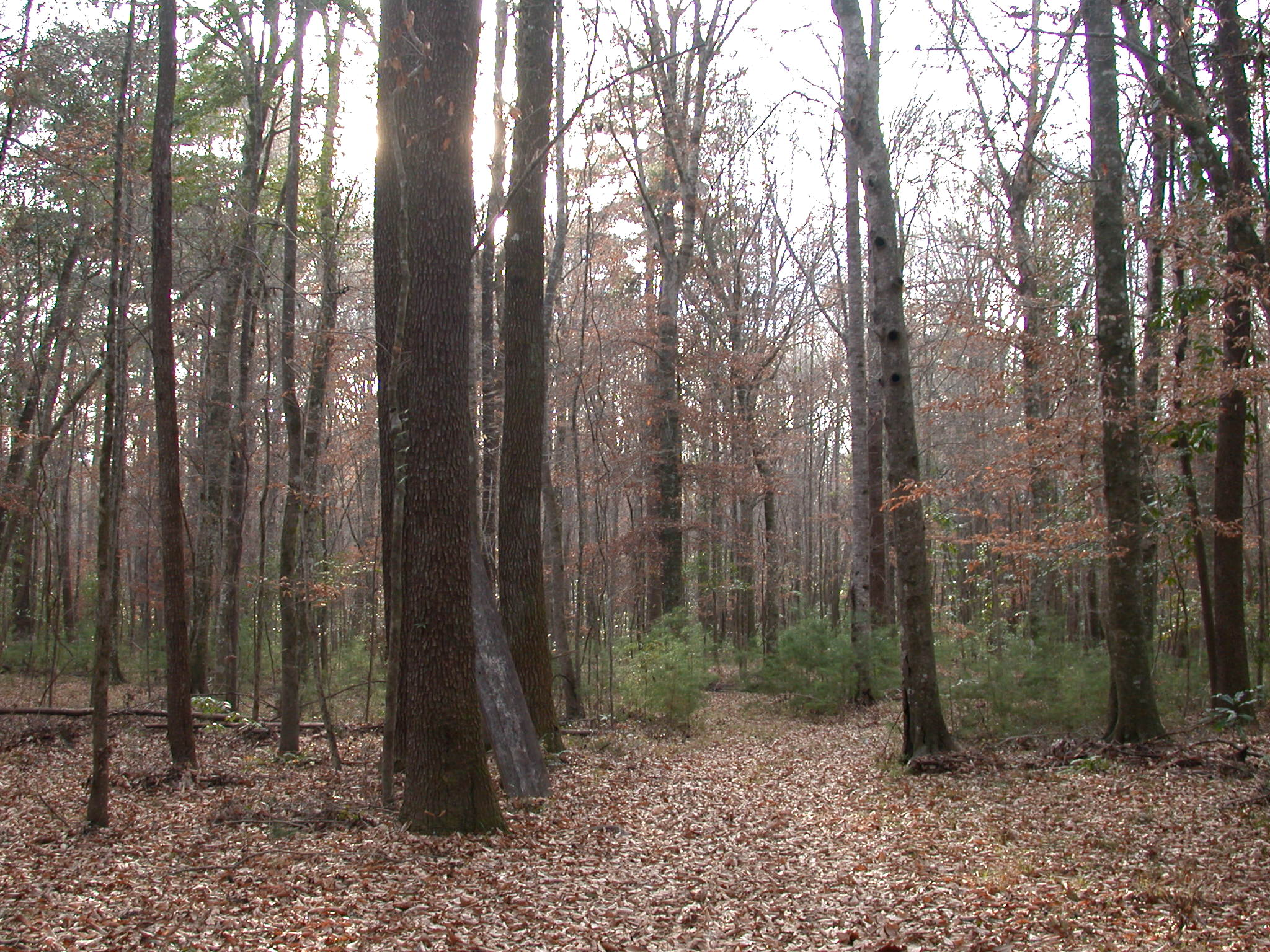
Bottomland mixed hardwood-spruce pine forest along the West Fork Amite River

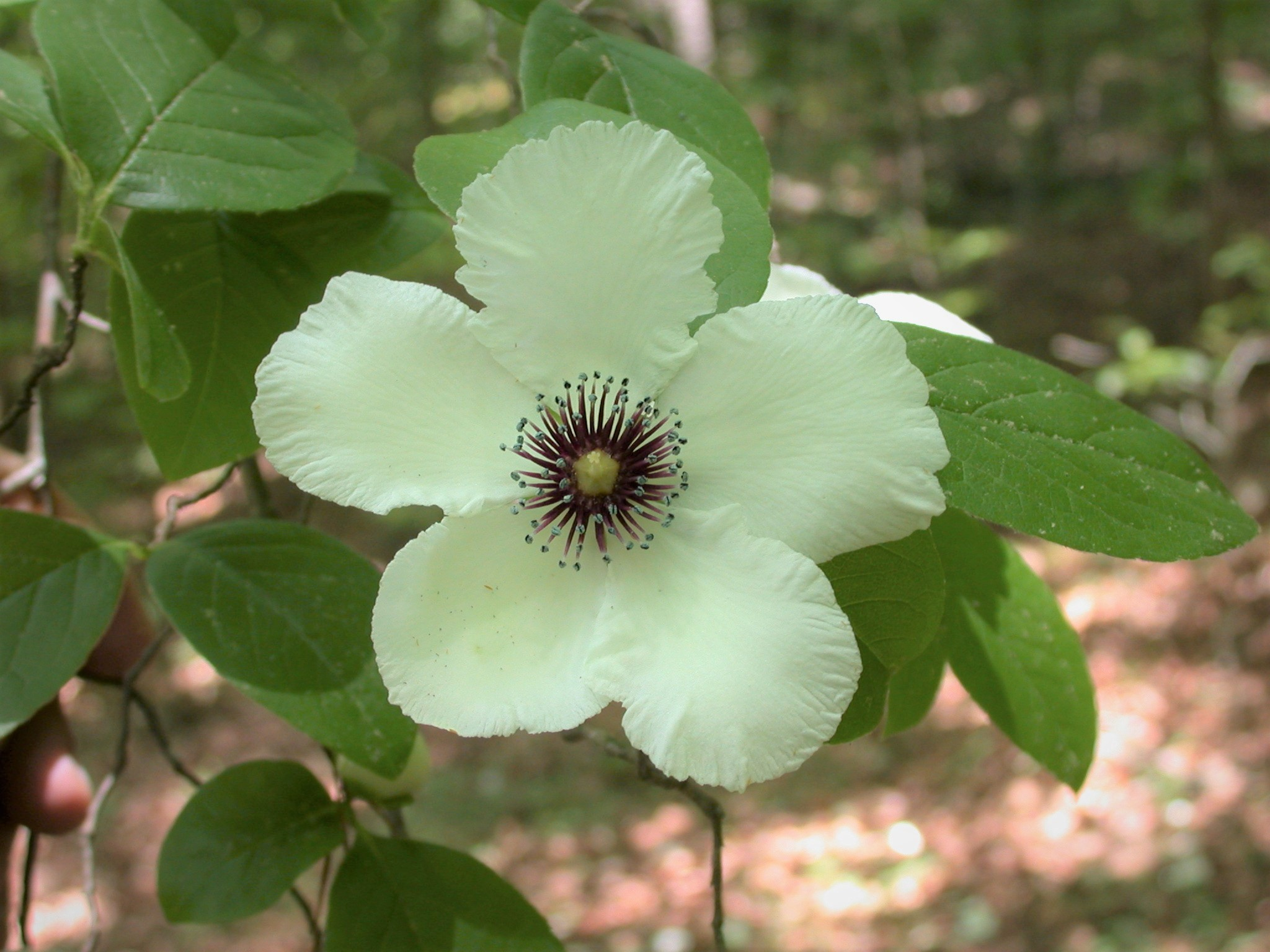
Stewartia malacodendron, or silky camellia, an uncommon species of the southeastern U.S.

== Communities ==
=== Towns ===
- Centreville (mostly in Wilkinson County)
- Crosby (partly in Wilkinson County)
- Gloster
- Liberty (county seat)

=== Unincorporated communities ===
- Bewelcome
- Coles
- Gillsburg
- Homochitto
- Hustler
- Smithdale

=== Ghost town ===
- Elysian Fields

== Demographics ==
Historical population
Census	Pop.	Note	%±
1810	4,750		—
1820	6,853		44.3%
1830	7,934		15.8%
1840	9,511		19.9%
1850	9,694		1.9%
1860	12,336		27.3%
1870	10,973		−11.0%
1880	14,004		27.6%
1890	18,198		29.9%
1900	20,708		13.8%
1910	22,954		10.8%
1920	18,960		−17.4%
1930	19,712		4.0%
1940	21,892		11.1%
1950	19,261		−12.0%
1960	15,573		−19.1%
1970	13,763		−11.6%
1980	13,369		−2.9%
1990	13,328		−0.3%
2000	13,599		2.0%
2010	13,131		−3.4%
2020	12,720		−3.1%
2025 (est.)	12,487	▼	−1.8%
U.S. Decennial Census; 1790–1960 1900–1990; 1990–2000 2010–2013 2020

=== Population ===
As mechanization of agriculture decreased the need for farm labor, the population has dropped since its peak in 1910 at 22,954, as people left in search of work in other areas. Continuing urbanization and suburbanization in other areas has also drawn people to cities of more opportunity. From a peak of population in 1910, the county had declined through 1990. In the early part of the 20th century, particularly from 1910 to 1930, and from 1940 to 1970, it was affected by the Great Migration of blacks out of the segregated society for jobs and opportunities in Midwest and later, West Coast cities. From 1910 to 1920, the population declined more than 17%, as may be seen from the census table at right. Particularly in the early 20th century, Blacks left to escape the oppression and violence associated with Jim Crow, lynchings, and their disenfranchisement after 1890.

From 1940 to 1960, the population declined by more than 29%. Rural whites also left in those years, but a much greater number of African Americans migrated to other areas. After 1930 they became a minority in the county. In 2000, they constituted nearly 43% of the population. As of the 2020 United States census, the population was 12,720.

=== 2020 census ===
As of the 2020 census, the county had a population of 12,720. The median age was 49.1 years. 19.5% of residents were under the age of 18 and 24.9% of residents were 65 years of age or older. For every 100 females there were 93.9 males, and for every 100 females age 18 and over there were 92.9 males age 18 and over.

The racial makeup of the county was 58.7% White, 38.2% Black or African American, 0.3% American Indian and Alaska Native, 0.2% Asian, <0.1% Native Hawaiian and Pacific Islander, 0.5% from some other race, and 2.2% from two or more races. Hispanic or Latino residents of any race comprised 1.0% of the population.

<0.1% of residents lived in urban areas, while 100.0% lived in rural areas.

There were 5,597 households in the county, of which 24.8% had children under the age of 18 living in them. Of all households, 43.1% were married-couple households, 22.0% were households with a male householder and no spouse or partner present, and 31.6% were households with a female householder and no spouse or partner present. About 34.1% of all households were made up of individuals and 17.5% had someone living alone who was 65 years of age or older.

There were 7,230 housing units, of which 22.6% were vacant. Among occupied housing units, 82.7% were owner-occupied and 17.3% were renter-occupied. The homeowner vacancy rate was 1.4% and the rental vacancy rate was 9.2%.

=== Racial and ethnic composition ===
Amite County, Mississippi – Racial and ethnic composition Note: the US Census treats Hispanic/Latino as an ethnic category. This table excludes Latinos from the racial categories and assigns them to a separate category. Hispanics/Latinos may be of any race.
Race / Ethnicity (NH = Non-Hispanic)	Pop 1980	Pop 1990	Pop 2000	Pop 2010	Pop 2020	% 1980	% 1990	% 2000	% 2010	% 2020
White alone (NH)	6,958	7,252	7,636	7,516	7,434	52.05%	54.41%	56.15%	57.24%	58.44%
Black or African American alone (NH)	6,293	6,026	5,756	5,396	4,835	47.07%	45.21%	42.33%	41.09%	38.01%
Native American or Alaska Native alone (NH)	1	11	16	22	25	0.01%	0.08%	0.12%	0.17%	0.20%
Asian alone (NH)	7	6	11	12	31	0.05%	0.05%	0.08%	0.09%	0.24%
Native Hawaiian or Pacific Islander alone (NH)	x	x	2	1	0	x	x	0.01%	0.01%	0.00%
Other race alone (NH)	0	0	3	4	18	0.00%	0.00%	0.02%	0.03%	0.14%
Mixed race or Multiracial (NH)	x	x	62	70	248	x	x	0.46%	0.53%	1.95%
Hispanic or Latino (any race)	110	33	113	110	129	0.82%	0.25%	0.83%	0.84%	1.01%
Total	13,369	13,328	13,599	13,131	12,720	100.00%	100.00%	100.00%	100.00%	100.00%

=== 2010 census ===
According to the 2010 U.S. census, 57.7% were White, 41.3% Black or African American, 0.2% Native American, 0.1% Asian, 0.2% of some other race and 0.6% of two or more races. 0.8% were Hispanic or Latino (of any race).

== Politics ==
Political affiliation and voting patterns in federal elections generally follow those of other traditional southern states, where strong affiliation of conservative whites to the Democratic Party dominated during the period up to and just beyond the Civil Rights era of the 1960s and 1970s. With the rise of the Republican Party of Richard Nixon and Ronald Reagan, the white population gradually began to support Republican national candidates, and ultimately shifted into the party. Given the support of the national Democratic Party leaders through the civil rights years, African-American voters affiliated with that party.

In several elections between World War II and the Civil Rights period, in a period of increasing social change, the white people of Amite County (who were the only ones able to vote in that period) voted for third-party candidates, including Dixiecrat candidate Strom Thurmond in 1948 (after Democratic President Harry S. Truman had taken action that year to integrate the military), Harry F. Byrd in 1960, and segregationist George Wallace in 1968.

United States presidential election results for Amite County, Mississippi
Year	Republican		Democratic		Third party(ies)	
Year	No.	%	No.	%	No.	%
1912	5	0.73%	666	97.08%	15	2.19%
1916	16	1.53%	1,024	97.90%	6	0.57%
1920	90	13.37%	578	85.88%	5	0.74%
1924	86	8.50%	926	91.50%	0	0.00%
1928	325	21.47%	1,189	78.53%	0	0.00%
1932	73	5.54%	1,237	93.85%	8	0.61%
1936	56	3.75%	1,421	95.24%	15	1.01%
1940	64	4.27%	1,435	95.73%	0	0.00%
1944	87	5.75%	1,426	94.25%	0	0.00%
1948	17	1.04%	55	3.37%	1,559	95.59%
1952	777	40.94%	1,121	59.06%	0	0.00%
1956	255	14.86%	802	46.74%	659	38.40%
1960	283	12.43%	338	14.85%	1,655	72.72%
1964	2,742	96.38%	103	3.62%	0	0.00%
1968	393	7.66%	1,533	29.87%	3,206	62.47%
1972	2,846	68.94%	1,185	28.71%	97	2.35%
1976	2,256	45.13%	2,574	51.49%	169	3.38%
1980	2,653	44.43%	3,229	54.08%	89	1.49%
1984	3,463	57.24%	2,569	42.46%	18	0.30%
1988	3,333	53.88%	2,834	45.81%	19	0.31%
1992	2,561	45.08%	2,608	45.91%	512	9.01%
1996	2,521	44.10%	2,824	49.41%	371	6.49%
2000	3,677	57.38%	2,673	41.71%	58	0.91%
2004	4,147	57.62%	3,012	41.85%	38	0.53%
2008	4,245	55.49%	3,348	43.76%	57	0.75%
2012	4,414	57.28%	3,242	42.07%	50	0.65%
2016	4,289	60.84%	2,697	38.26%	64	0.91%
2020	4,503	62.58%	2,620	36.41%	73	1.01%
2024	4,484	65.80%	2,246	32.96%	85	1.25%

== Education ==
There is one school district, the Amite County School District.

Amite County is in the district of Southwest Mississippi Community College.

== Notable people ==
- Louis Allen, African-American property owner and logger, murdered for civil rights activities
- Carl Elkanah Bates, President of the Southern Baptist Convention, 1970-1972
- L. C. Bates, African-American civil rights activist and the husband of Daisy Bates
- Robert P. Briscoe, World War II Navy Cross recipient and US Navy four-star Admiral
- Will D. Campbell, white Baptist minister, author, and civil rights activist
- Jerry Clower, country comedian
- J. C. Gilbert, member of Louisiana State Senate and Louisiana House of Representatives
- David Green, Mississippi state legislator and businessman
- Carl Augustus Hansberry, businessman and plaintiff in Hansberry v. Lee U.S. Supreme Court case; father of playwright Lorraine Hansberry
- William Leo Hansberry, scholar. Uncle of playwright Lorraine Hansberry
- E.H. Hurst, white Mississippi state legislator who murdered activist Herbert Lee in cold blood and was not prosecuted
- Gabe Jackson, American football player for the Oakland Raiders of the National Football League (NFL)
- Herbert Lee, married African-American farmer and father of nine, murdered in cold blood in front of witnesses in 1961 by E.L. Hurst in a civil rights case
- William F. Love, U.S. Representative from Mississippi
- T. T. Martin, evangelist and prominent figure in the anti-evolution movement in the 1920s; buried in Gloster
- Frank A. McLain, U.S. Representative from Mississippi
- Anne Moody, civil rights activist and author of Coming of Age in Mississippi
- Glenn Moore, softball coach
- Leon Perry, American football player
- Barney Poole, American football player
- Clyde V. Ratcliff, member of the Louisiana Senate from 1944 to 1948
- Andy Rodgers, Delta blues harmonicist, guitarist, singer and songwriter
- Reverend Isaac Simmons, a Black farmer, was lynched by six white men in 1944 when he refused to give up his farmland to the men.
- George H. Tichenor, inventor of an antiseptic, briefly lived and married in Liberty
- E. M. Toler, physician and coroner who served in the Louisiana State Senate from East and West Feliciana parishes
- Linda T. Walker, federal magistrate; judge for the United States District Court for the Northern District of Georgia
- James W. Washington Jr., African-American painter and sculptor
- Franklin Delano Williams, Gospel music singer
- Damien Wilson, NFL player for the Dallas Cowboys

== See also ==
- National Register of Historic Places listings in Amite County, Mississippi
