= Bewelcome, Mississippi =

- Unincorporated community
- Location within Mississippi Location within the United States
- Coordinates: 31°13′08″N 90°56′19″W
- Country: United States
- State: Mississippi
- County: Amite
- Elevation: 387 ft (118 m)
- Time zone: UTC-6 (Central (CST))
  - Summer (DST): UTC-5 (CDT)
- GNIS feature ID: 692589

Bewelcome (also Be Welcome) is an unincorporated community in Amite County, Mississippi, United States.

The settlement is located within the Homochitto National Forest.

== History ==
The Woodland United Methodist Church was established east of the settlement in 1870. A cemetery was also located there. The church closed in 2008.

Bewelcome had a post office in the early 1900s.
