= Mississippi Highway 570 =

State highway in Mississippi

Mississippi Highway 570

Route information
- Maintained by MDOT, City of McComb, Pike County
- Length: 30.247 mi (48.678 km)
- Existed: 1957–present

Western segment
- Length: 17.290 mi (27.826 km)
- West end: US 98 near Smithdale
- Major intersections: I-55 / US 98 in McComb
- East end: US 51 in McComb

Eastern segment
- Length: 12.957 mi (20.852 km)
- West end: MS 44 in McComb
- East end: MS 44 near Pricedale

Location
- Country: United States
- State: Mississippi
- Counties: Franklin, Amite, Pike

Highway system
- Mississippi State Highway System; Interstate; US; State
| ← MS 569 | → MS 571 |

Mississippi Highway 570 (MS 570) is a two-segment state highway in the U.S. state of Mississippi that travels in the vicinity of McComb. The western segment runs from U.S. Route 98 (US 98) in Franklin County to US 51 in McComb. The eastern segment runs from MS 44 in McComb to MS 44 near Pricedale.

== Route description ==
MS 570 begins in rural southeastern Franklin County at an intersection with US 98. The two-lane road heads south for about 0.7 miles (1.1 km) when it enters Amite County. After about 0.4 miles (0.64 km), at an intersection with Wroten Road and Townsend Road and adjacent to a church and cemetery, MS 570 heads east and later southeast. The road travels through the community of Smithdale but otherwise goes through wooded areas. It has an intersection with MS 569. At the Pike County line, the road curves more to the east. MS 570 enters the city limits of McComb, becomes known as Veterans Boulevard, and briefly expands to a four-lane divided highway as many businesses begin to line the road. A diamond interchange provides access to Interstate 55 (I-55) and US 98 at the former's exit 18. Immediately after the interchange, the unsigned MS 938 provides access to Mississippi Department of Transportation's (MDOT) District 7 headquarters, Uptown McComb (formerly Edgewood Mall), and other businesses. The road skirts the northern edge of a residential neighborhood before ending at a T-intersection with US 51.

The MS 570 designation resumes on the east side of McComb at the intersection of Pearl River Road, MS 44, and Locust Avenue. The highway heads north along North Locust Avenue, but as a city-maintained road through a residential neighborhood. At Avenue H and Jordan Circle, state maintenance of this segment begins and signage for MS 570 resumes. The road makes a jog to the east and exits the city limits. To the east of the town of Summit, MS 570 makes a turn to the east at the unsigned MS 906 and Horace Holmes Drive. After making a brief jog to the north, MS 570 continues east through a mix of woods and open fields. It crosses Bogue Chitto River on a 375-foot-long (114 m) bridge. At Topisaw Road, MS 570 turns to the southeast on the county-maintained West Topisaw Road S while the state maintained road continues straight along unsigned MS 591. No signage for MS 570 is present along this segment that heads south through mostly woods and one open field. MS 570 formally ends at MS 44 with the road continuing straight as West Topisaw Road S.

== History ==
MS 570 was created in 1957 along roads that had not previously been part of the state highway system. The alignment has generally remained the same since then. However, the two segments were connected via US 51 and MS 44 (Pearl River Avenue) in McComb. Though MS 591 continues north from its intersection with MS 570 past its end of state maintenance towards Ruth with the name "Highway 570," it was never part of MS 570.

== Major intersections ==
| County | Location | mi | km | Destinations | Notes |
|---|---|---|---|---|---|
| Franklin | | 0.000 | 0.000 | US 98 – Meadville, Summit | Western terminus |
| Amite | | 5.444 | 8.761 | MS 569 – Liberty | |
| Pike | McComb | 16.690– 16.797 | 26.860– 27.032 | I-55 / US 98 – New Orleans, Brookhaven | Exit 18 (I-55) |
| Pike | McComb | 16.828 | 27.082 | MS 938 north (MDOT Drive / Frontage Road) / Pikes Point Circle | Southern terminus of MS 938 |
| Pike | McComb | 17.290 | 27.826 | US 51 (Northwest Street) – Summit, McComb | Eastern terminus of western segment |
| Pike | McComb | Gap in route | | | |
| Pike | McComb | 17.290 | 27.826 | MS 44 east (Pearl River Avenue) / South Locust Street to US 98 | Western terminus of eastern segment; western terminus of MS 44 segment |
| Pike | | 19.587 | 31.522 | MS 906 west (Robb Street) / Horace Holmes Road – Southwest Mississippi Community College | Eastern terminus of MS 906 |
| Pike | | 27.493 | 44.246 | MS 591 north / West Topisaw Road N | Southern terminus of MS 591 |
| Pike | | 30.247 | 48.678 | MS 44 / West Topisaw Road S | Eastern terminus |
1.000 mi = 1.609 km; 1.000 km = 0.621 mi
