= Leon Perry =

American football player (born 1957)

No. 30
- Position: Running back

Personal information
- Born: August 14, 1957 (age 69); Gloster, Mississippi, U.S.
- Listed height: 5 ft 11 in (1.80 m)
- Listed weight: 224 lb (102 kg)

Career information
- High school: Amite County (Liberty, Mississippi)
- College: Mississippi (1976–1979)
- NFL draft: 1980: undrafted

Career history
- New York Giants (1980–1982); San Francisco 49ers (1983)*; Birmingham Stallions (1984–1985); Orlando Renegades (1985)
- * Offseason or practice squad member only

Career NFL statistics
- Rushing yards: 543
- Rushing average: 4.1
- Touchdowns: 3
- Stats at Pro Football Reference

Leon Perry Jr. (born August 14, 1957) is an American former professional football player who was a running back in the National Football League (NFL) and United States Football League (USFL). He played in the NFL for the New York Giants and in the USFL for the Birmingham Stallions and Orlando Renegades. He played college football for the Ole Miss Rebels.
