= Hustler, Mississippi =

- Unincorporated community
- Location within Mississippi Location within the United States
- Coordinates: 31°16′56″N 90°41′51″W
- Country: United States
- State: Mississippi
- County: Amite
- Elevation: 443 ft (135 m)
- Time zone: UTC-6 (Central (CST))
  - Summer (DST): UTC-5 (CDT)
- GNIS feature ID: 691954

Hustler is an unincorporated community in Amite County, Mississippi, United States.

The settlement is located along Mississippi Highway 569, 10.9 mi (17.5 km) northeast of Liberty.

Hustler had a population of 18 in 1900. The post office closed in 1905.
