= George H. Tichenor =

American physician

George Humphrey Tichenor
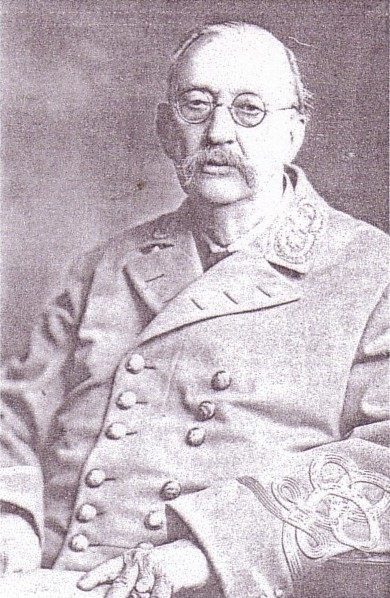
- George H. Tichenor, as U.C.V. Louisiana Division Commander, 1916–1918
- Born: April 17, 1837; Ohio County, Kentucky
- Died: January 14, 1923 (aged 86); Louisiana
- Resting place: Roselawn Cemetery
- Known for: Antiseptic surgery
- Medical career
- Profession: Physician

George Humphrey Tichenor (April 12, 1837 – January 14, 1923) was a Kentucky-born physician who introduced antiseptic surgery while in the service of the Confederate States of America. Thereafter, in private practice in Canton (Madison County), Mississippi, he developed the formula that became "Dr. Tichenor's Antiseptic."

== Early life and education ==
Tichenor was born in Ohio County in western Kentucky to Rolla Tichenor and the former Elizabeth Hymphrey. He was educated in private schools.

== Career ==
Initially, Tichenor was a businessman in Franklin (Williamson County), Tennessee, when the American Civil War began. After the American Civil War had begun, in 1861, he entered military service with the 22nd Tennessee Cavalry Regiment.

In 1863, he became an enrolling Confederate officer, and thereafter an assistant surgeon, during which time he is believed to have been the first in the Confederacy to have used antiseptic surgery. Tichenor experimented with the use of alcohol as an antiseptic on wounds. He was badly wounded in the leg in 1863, and amputation was recommended. He insisted on treating his wounds with an alcohol-based solution of his own devising. His wound healed, and he regained the use of his leg.

His potential reputation as a humanitarian was clouded by his fierce regional loyalty; Tichenor insisted that his techniques be used only on injured Confederates, never on Union prisoners.

An unconfirmed story was later circulated that Dr. Tichenor's antiseptic was granted the first patent issued by the Confederate government. An image of the Confederate Battle Flag remained on the product label well into the 20th century.

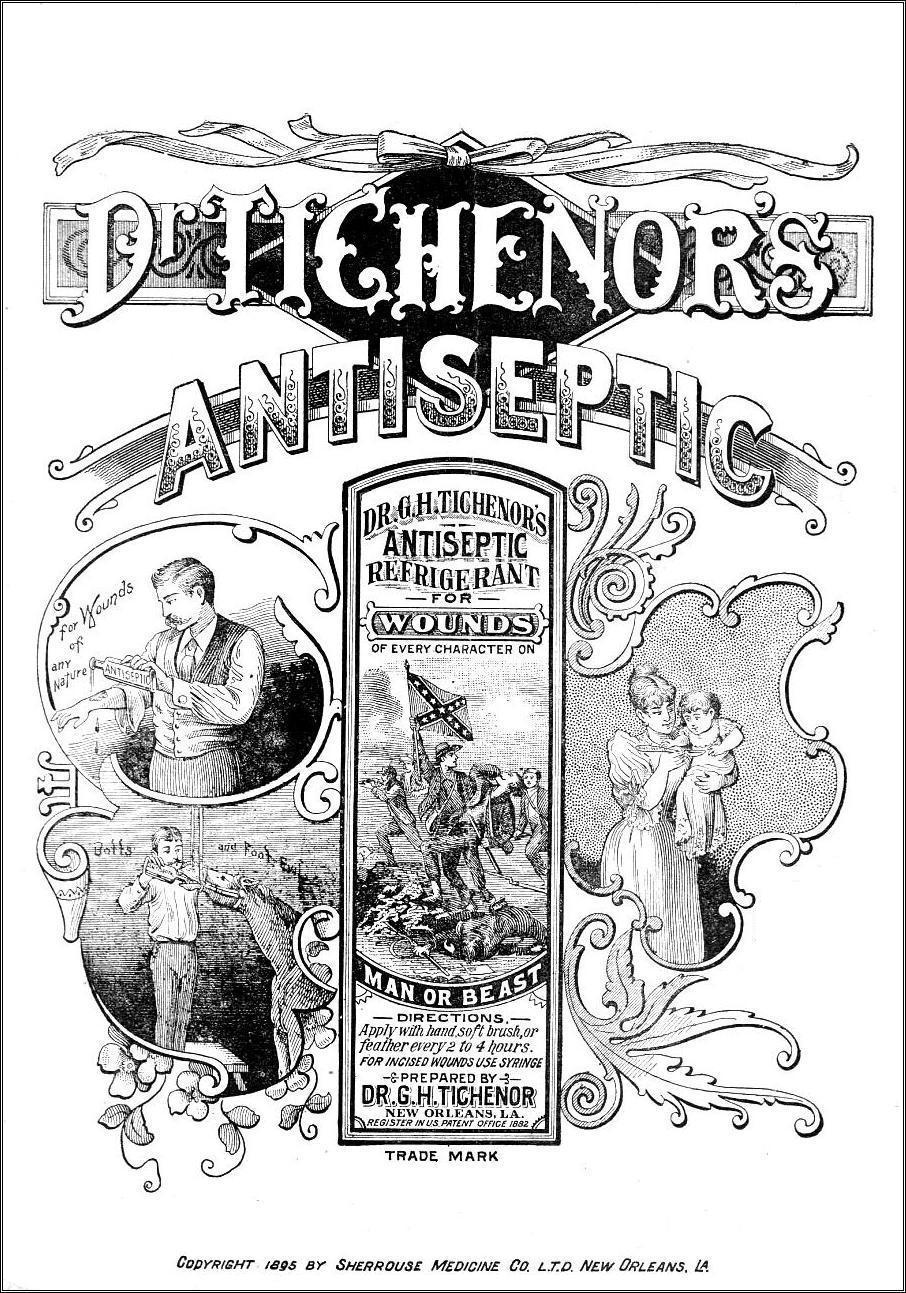
1895 advertisement for Dr. Tichenor's Antiseptic

Tichenor developed his antiseptic formula in Canton, Mississippi, and thereafter practiced medicine in Baton Rouge, Louisiana, from 1869 to 1887. He started bottling Dr. Tichenor's Patent Medicine in New Orleans; the formula, consisting of alcohol, oil of peppermint, and arnica, was originally marketed as useful for a wide variety of complaints for both internal and external use for man and animal. A patent was registered in 1882. The company producing this liquid was incorporated in 1905 and is still in existence, though the recommended uses are now more modest: principally as a mouthwash and topical antiseptic.

== Personal life ==
Tichenor married the former Margaret A. Drane of Kentucky while they were in Canton. They had three sons: Rolla A. Tichenor, George H. Tichenor Jr., and Elmore Drane Tichenor. He was a member of the Masonic Lodge and the Baptist Church. He was adjutant general and commander of the Louisiana division of the United Confederate Veterans.

He is interred in Roselawn Memorial Park in Baton Rouge, La.
