= Homochitto, Mississippi =

- Unincorporated community
- Location within Mississippi Location within the United States
- Coordinates: 31°19′12″N 90°59′02″W
- Country: United States
- State: Mississippi
- County: Amite
- Elevation: 164 ft (50 m)
- Time zone: UTC-6 (Central (CST))
  - Summer (DST): UTC-5 (CDT)
- GNIS feature ID: 693516

Homochitto is an unincorporated community in Amite County, Mississippi, United States.

== History ==
Homochitto was named after the Homochitto River.
