= Bethany Presbyterian Church =

Historic church in Mississippi, United States

- U.S. National Register of Historic Places
- Location within Mississippi Location within the United States
- Nearest city: Centreville, Mississippi
- Coordinates: 31°6′7″N 90°59′11″W
- Area: less than one acre
- Built: 1855
- Architectural style: Greek Revival
- NRHP reference No.: 03000553
- Added to NRHP: June 23, 2003

Bethany Presbyterian Church is a historic church in Ariel, Mississippi, United States, near the incorporated towns of Centreville and Liberty. The church is along Mississippi Highway 48. The one-roomed church building once saw congregations over 100 every Sunday, but those numbers have dwindled in recent years. The church was listed on the National Register of Historic Places in 2003.

== Description ==
The Bethany Presbyterian Church is a large one-room church painted white and built of cypress wood. The church is raised off the ground by massive wooden beams and features a green metal roof and green shuttered windows. Wooden pews inside the church were split down the middle to divide men and women during services. Also on the grounds is a cemetery, with many of the headstones dating back to the 1800s.

The gabling of the church is in the Greek Revival style, a commonly-found trait among 19th-century buildings.

== History ==
The church was founded on October 8, 1808, by the Reverend James Smylie and the Reverend William Montgomery, making the church the fourth-oldest Presbyterian church in the Mississippi Territory and the second-oldest in terms of continuous existence. The first building was a log structure about 4 miles (6.4 km) south of the present location. This building was used until 1832. Smylie was noted for his efforts in preaching to enslaved populations. A catechism allowing his teaching was allowed by the regional synod.

The second building of the church, called "New Bethany" was built c. 1831, along Beaver Creek, about 3 miles (4.8 km) south of the current location. A one-room schoolhouse was also near the second building. A fire destroyed the building, prompting the construction of a third church.

The current church building was constructed in 1855. In the 1800s, the church regularly pulled in over 100 attendees. Prior to the American Civil War, enslaved people would sit in the rear, and after they were emancipated, formerly enslaved Black people continued to attend until the 1920s. The construction of Camp Van Dorn in the 1940s displaced many of the residents along Highway 48, meaning many of the church's attendees were affected.

In June 1958, an educational building was constructed on the property. In 1973, the church split away from the Presbyterian Church in the United States and joined the more conservative Presbyterian Church in America.

A 2003 Enterprise-Journal report found that only ten members regularly attended, with half of that total being the pastor's family. That year, on June 23, the church was added to the National Register of Historic Places.
