= Homochitto, Issaquena County, Mississippi =

Homochitto, Mississippi
- Plantation
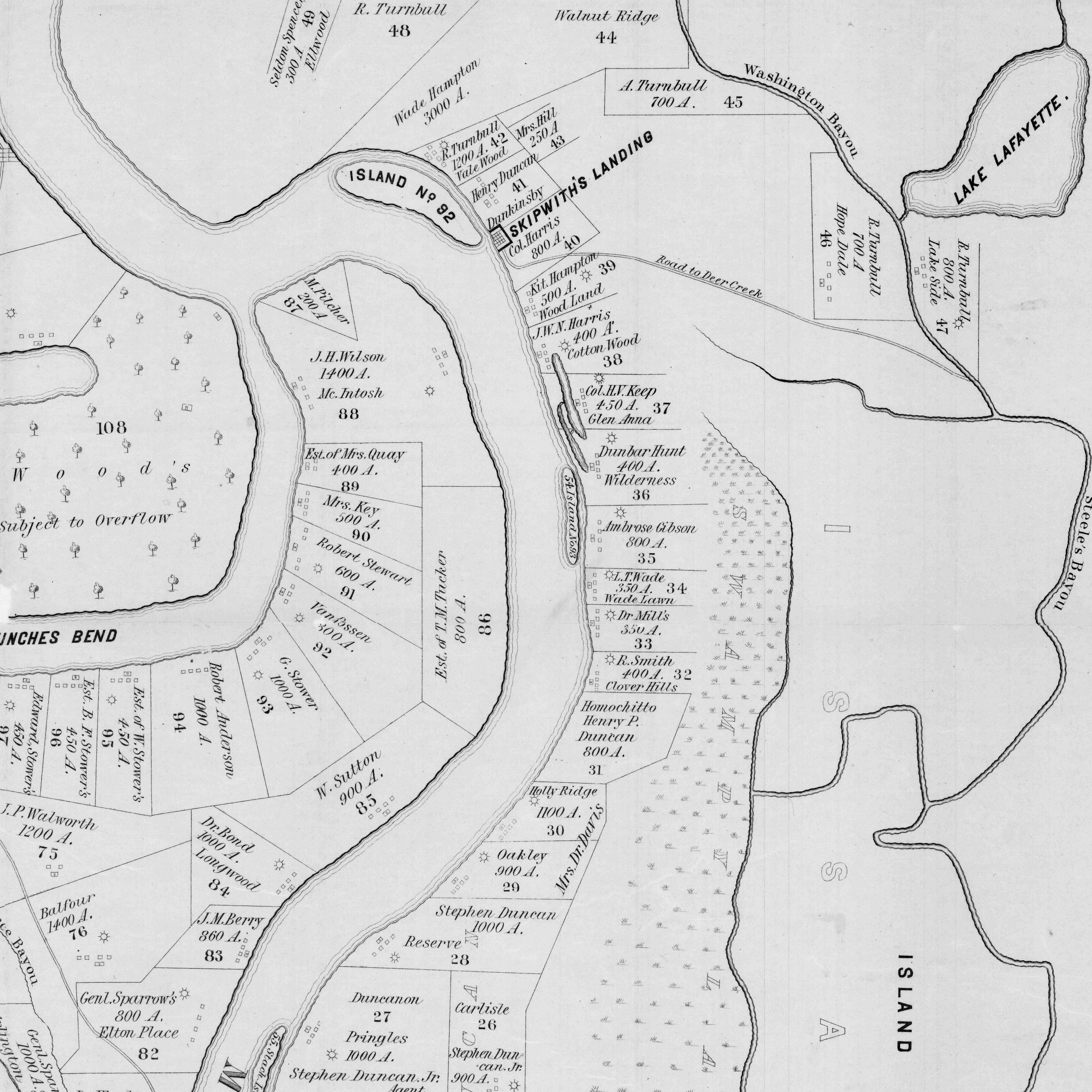
- Part of Issaquena County c. 1866–1874 showing location of Homochitto along the Mississippi River

- Location within Mississippi Location within the United States
- Coordinates: 32°52′03″N 91°03′36″W
- Country: United States
- State: Mississippi
- County: Issaquena
- Elevation: 98 ft (30 m)
- Time zone: UTC-6 (Central (CST))
  - Summer (DST): UTC-5 (CDT)
- GNIS feature ID: 687598

Homochitto was an 800-acre (320 ha) plantation located directly on the Mississippi River in Issaquena County (initially the lower portion of Washington County), Mississippi, United States. According to one source, Homochitto is a Choctaw name likely meaning "big red", and was earlier applied to the Homochitto River in Mississippi.

Homochitto Plantation was owned by Stephen Duncan. The 1831 tax rolls indicated that Duncan enslaved 96 individuals on the 1,520 acres (6.2 km^{2}) property.

In 1865, following the abolition of slavery, a number of freedmen were listed at the Homochitto Plantation. Duncan had a reconstruction contract "Disapproved for insufficient compensation to freedmen". The plantation was included on a U.S. government map of lands available for lease during the Reconstruction period. The map lists Homochitto as property 31, and indicates that unlike neighboring plantations, it has no main residence, no slave quarters, and no cotton gin. The legal owner is listed as Henry P. Duncan.
