= Amite County School District =

School district in Mississippi

Address
- 533 Maggie Street Liberty, Amite County, Mississippi; United States

District information
- Grades: K-12
- Schools: 4
- District ID: 2800420

Students and staff
- Students: 871
- Teachers: 92.59 FTE
- Student–teacher ratio: 9.41:1

Other information
- Website: www.amite.k12.ms.us

The Amite County School District (ACSD) is a public school district based in Liberty, Mississippi (USA). The district's boundaries parallel those of Amite County. In addition to Liberty, the district includes Gloster and the Amite County portions of Centreville and Crosby.

== Schools ==
- Amite County Elementary School (Liberty; Grades K-6)
- Amite County Middle School (Liberty; Grades 7-8)
- Amite County High School (Liberty; Grades 9-12)
- Amite County Career And Technical Center (Liberty; Grades 9-12)

== Demographics ==
=== 2006-07 school year ===
There were a total of 1,309 students enrolled in the Amite County School District during the 2006–2007 school year. The gender makeup of the district was 49% female and 51% male. The racial makeup of the district was 84.26% African American, 15.13% White, 0.53% Hispanic, and 0.08% Native American. All of the district's students were eligible to receive free lunch.

=== Previous school years ===
School Year	Enrollment	Gender Makeup		Racial Makeup				
School Year	Enrollment	Female	Male	Asian	African American	Hispanic	Native American	White
2005-06	1,500	49%	51%	–	83.73%	0.73%	0.07%	15.47%
2004-05	1,338	49%	51%	–	82.66%	0.30%	0.07%	16.97%
2003-04	1,436	49%	51%	–	81.69%	0.63%	–	17.69%
2002-03	1,488	49%	51%	0.07%	82.12%	0.40%	–	17.41%

== Accountability statistics ==
	2006-07	2005-06	2004-05	2003-04	2002-03
District Accreditation Status	Accredited	Accredited	Advised	Accredited	Advised
School Performance Classifications
Level 5 (Superior Performing) Schools	0	0	0	0	0♥♥
Level 4 (Exemplary) Schools	0	0	0	0	0
Level 3 (Successful) Schools	1	1	1	2	0
Level 2 (Under Performing) Schools	2	2	2	1	2
Level 1 (Low Performing) Schools	0	0	0	0	1
Not Assigned	0	0	0	0	0

== See also ==
- List of school districts in Mississippi
