= Crosby, Mississippi =

Crosby
- Town
- Location of Crosby, Mississippi

- Location in Mississippi Crosby (the United States)
- Coordinates: 31°16′44″N 91°3′41″W
- Country: United States
- State: Mississippi
- Counties: Wilkinson, Amite

Area
  - Total: 2.13 sq mi (5.51 km^{2})
  - Land: 2.12 sq mi (5.49 km^{2})
  - Water: 0.0077 sq mi (0.02 km^{2})
- Elevation: 171 ft (52 m)

Population (2020)
  - Total: 242
  - Density: 114.2/sq mi (44.08/km^{2})
- Time zone: UTC-6 (Central (CST))
  - Summer (DST): UTC-5 (CDT)
- ZIP code: 39633
- Area code: 601
- FIPS code: 28-16620
- GNIS feature ID: 0693015

Crosby is a town in Amite and Wilkinson counties, Mississippi, United States. It is part of the McComb, Mississippi micropolitan statistical area. Its population was 242 at the 2020 census.

== History ==
Crosby was originally named Dayton in 1884, as a tribute to landowner David Day, who provided a right-of-way for the Yazoo and Mississippi Valley Railroad (Y&MV). In 1900, the population of Dayton was 30.

By 1916, the Foster Creek Lumber Company had acquired around 52,000 acres (21,000 ha) of timberland in Wilkinson and Amite Counties, which included Dayton. At that time, two Stephenson brothers from Michigan were building several sawmills in south Mississippi and purchased the Foster Creek Lumber Company landholdings. The Stephenson brothers had a new sawmill constructed as well as a new town that included modern homes, a commissary, and post office near the Y&MV railroad. The old town of Dayton was moved to the new town which was renamed Stephenson. By July 1917, the sawmill was completed and started processing lumber. Because the Stephenson brothers were most interested in building sawmills rather than operating them, they sold their interest in the Foster Creek Lumber and Manufacturing Company in 1918.

The Foster Creek Lumber Company sawmill at Stephenson continued to operate through the 1920s. Because the company was heavily mortgaged, it was negatively impacted by the Great Depression in 1929, and the sawmill closed in 1931.

In January 1934, L.O. Crosby Sr., a wealthy, self-made lumberman from Picayune, Mississippi purchased Foster Creek Lumber and Manufacturing Company including the sawmill, the town of Stephenson, and 55,000 acres (22,000 ha) of timberland. The town of Stephenson was renamed Crosby on April 4, 1934. L.O. Crosby reactivated the Stephenson sawmill in 1934 under the name Crosby Lumber and Manufacturing Company, and the sawmill continued to operate for another 28 years, shutting down in November 1963.

In 1965, Crosby Lumber and Manufacturing sold its landholdings in the area to St. Regis Paper Company, and the Crosby sawmill was sold to Hood Lumber Company.

== Geography ==
Crosby straddles the boundary between Amite County on the north and east and Wilkinson County on the west. In the 2000 census, 258 of the town's 360 residents (71.7%) lived in Wilkinson County and 102 (28.3%) in Amite County. According to the United States Census Bureau, the town has a total area of 2.1 square miles (5.5 km^{2}), of which 2.1 square miles (5.5 km^{2}) is land and 0.47% is water.

== Demographics ==
Historical population
Census	Pop.	Note	%±
1940	1,489		—
1950	1,152		−22.6%
1960	705		−38.8%
1970	491		−30.4%
1980	349		−28.9%
1990	465		33.2%
2000	360		−22.6%
2010	318		−11.7%
2020	242		−23.9%
U.S. Decennial Census

=== Racial and ethnic composition ===
Crosby town, Mississippi – Racial and ethnic composition Note: the US Census treats Hispanic/Latino as an ethnic category. This table excludes Latinos from the racial categories and assigns them to a separate category. Hispanics/Latinos may be of any race.
Race / Ethnicity (NH = Non-Hispanic)	Pop 2000	Pop 2010	Pop 2020	% 2000	% 2010	% 2020
White alone (NH)	100	62	55	27.78%	19.50%	22.73%
Black or African American alone (NH)	259	253	175	71.94%	79.56%	72.31%
Native American or Alaska Native alone (NH)	0	1	0	0.00%	0.31%	0.00%
Asian alone (NH)	0	0	0	0.00%	0.00%	0.00%
Native Hawaiian or Pacific Islander alone (NH)	0	0	0	0.00%	0.00%	0.00%
Other race alone (NH)	0	0	2	0.00%	0.00%	0.83%
Mixed race or Multiracial (NH)	1	2	8	0.28%	0.63%	3.31%
Hispanic or Latino (any race)	0	0	2	0.00%	0.00%	0.83%
Total	360	318	242	100.00%	100.00%	100.00%

=== 2020 census ===
According to the 2020 United States census, there were 242 people, 99 households, and 59 families residing in the town; its racial and ethnic makeup in 2020 was 72.31% Black or African American, 22.73% non-Hispanic white, 4.13% other or mixed, and 0.83% Hispanic or Latino of any race.

== Education ==
The town of Crosby is served by two public school districts: Amite County and Wilkinson County (for the Wilkinson County portion).

Both counties are in the district of Southwest Mississippi Community College.

== Notable people ==
- Boyd Brown, former tight end for the Denver Broncos and New York Giants
