= Gillsburg, Mississippi =

- Unincorporated community
- Location within Mississippi Location within the United States
- Coordinates: 31°01′31″N 90°39′21″W
- Country: United States
- State: Mississippi
- County: Amite
- Elevation: 302 ft (92 m)
- Time zone: UTC-6 (Central (CST))
  - Summer (DST): UTC-5 (CDT)
- GNIS feature ID: 690914

Gillsburg, also spelled as Gillsburgh, is an unincorporated community in Amite County, Mississippi, United States. The community is part of the McComb, Mississippi Micropolitan Statistical Area.

== History ==
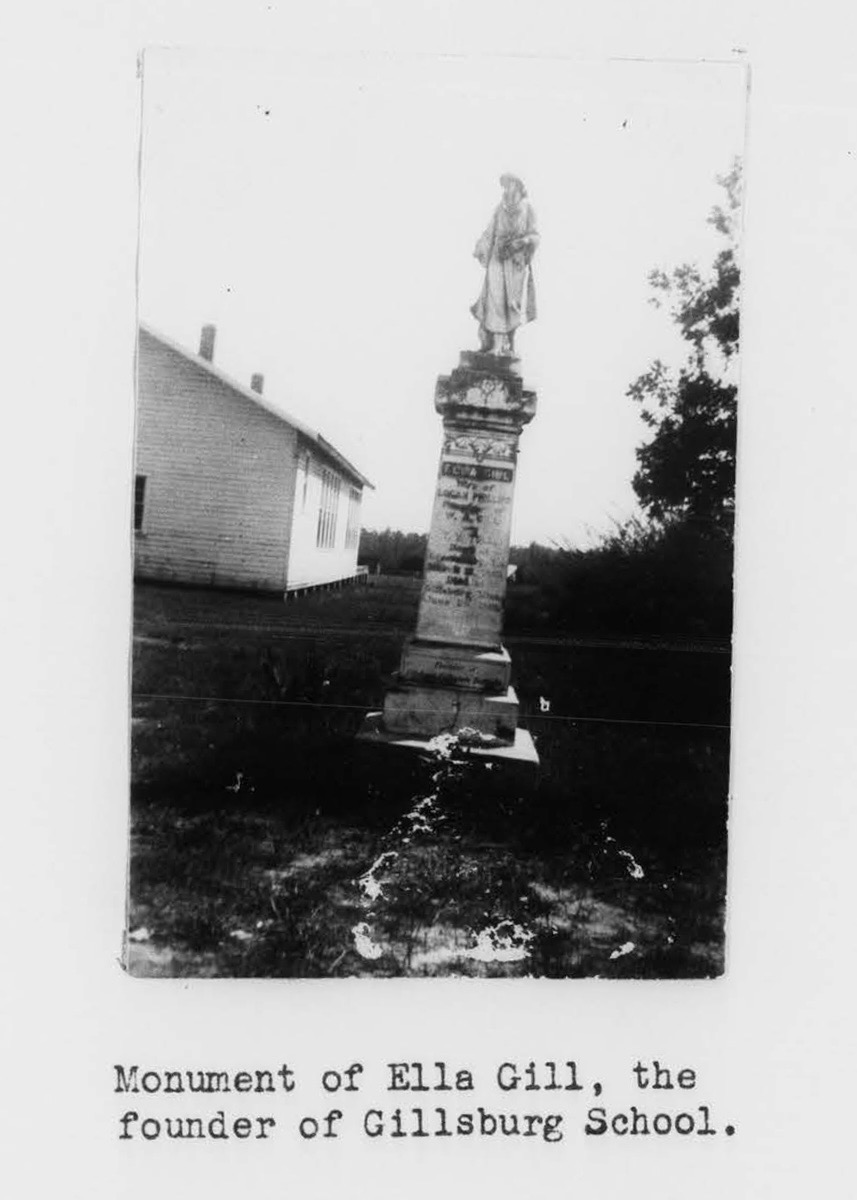
Monument of Ella Gill, the founder of GILLSBURG school

According to the history of Amite County produced by the WPA in the 1930s: "GILLSBURG was named for W. A. Gill, its founder. T. C. Schilling in his history states: 'That it was in the year 1882 that he established in Amite County, by his own efforts and with his own money, the Gillsburg Collegiate Institute, a high school which has lived longer and accomplished more than any other in this section. Moving his family and business interests from Greensburg, La., his former home, to Amite County, he built a splendid village, which took his name, and which soon became a center of influence for miles around'. Gillsburg is today a prosperous little village, its mercantile interests being represented by only two stores, Stewart & Williams, and the store of Miller Reynolds. A church, a school, and a gin comprise other public interests. The population of Gillsburg is small, but the section in which it is located is thickly settled and represent areas of the county."

Gillsburg was the location of the October 20, 1977 plane crash that killed three members of the band Lynyrd Skynyrd. A rental plane carrying the band between shows from Greenville, South Carolina, to LSU in Baton Rouge, Louisiana, was low on fuel and crashed in a swamp in Gillsburg. The crash killed singer/songwriter Ronnie Van Zant, guitarist Steve Gaines, vocalist Cassie Gaines, assistant road manager Dean Kilpatrick, pilot Walter McCreary, and co-pilot William Gray. The other band members were seriously injured in the crash.

Gillsburg was home to the Wall family, one of the last black families to be held in peonage in the United States.

A post office operated under the name Gillsburgh from 1879 to 1892 and under the name Gillsburg from 1892 to 1915.

=== Tornadoes ===
Gillsburg has been struck by two tornadoes rated F3/EF3 in intensity. The first of these (possibly a tornado family) tracked from Gloster and into parts of Gillsburg on April 6, 1935, killing 14 and injuring 220. The second struck on December 13, 1977, injuring two, though this tornado was rated F2 by Grazulis.

== Notable persons ==
- Drury Wall, member of the Mississippi House of Representatives from 1916 to 1920
- Frank Wall, member of the Mississippi House of Representatives from 1952 to 1960
