= Beechwood, Mississippi =

- Unincorporated community Census designated place
- Location in the United States
- Coordinates: 32°19′49″N 90°49′08″W
- Country: United States
- State: Mississippi
- County: Warren

Area
  - Total: 6.32 sq mi (16.38 km^{2})
  - Land: 6.27 sq mi (16.23 km^{2})
  - Water: 0.062 sq mi (0.16 km^{2})
- Elevation: 217 ft (66 m)

Population (2020)
  - Total: 3,469
  - Density: 554/sq mi (213.8/km^{2})
- Time zone: UTC-6 (Central (CST))
  - Summer (DST): UTC-5 (CDT)
- ZIP code: 39180
- Area code: 601
- FIPS code: 28-04705
- GNIS feature ID: 2586582

Beechwood is an unincorporated community and census-designated place (CDP) in Warren County, Mississippi, United States. The population was 3,469 at the 2020 census.

== Demographics ==
Historical population
Census	Pop.	Note	%±
2010	3,426		—
2020	3,469		1.3%
U.S. Decennial Census; 2010 2020

Beechwood first appeared as a census designated place in the 2010 U.S. census.

=== Racial and ethnic composition ===
Beechwood CDP, Mississippi – Racial and ethnic composition Note: the US Census treats Hispanic/Latino as an ethnic category. This table excludes Latinos from the racial categories and assigns them to a separate category. Hispanics/Latinos may be of any race.
Race / Ethnicity (NH = Non-Hispanic)	Pop 2010	Pop 2020	% 2010	% 2020
White alone (NH)	1,853	1,686	54.09%	48.60%
Black or African American alone (NH)	1,414	1,601	41.27%	46.15%
Native American or Alaska Native alone (NH)	8	2	0.23%	0.06%
Asian alone (NH)	35	39	1.02%	1.12%
Native Hawaiian or Pacific Islander alone (NH)	0	0	0.00%	0.00%
Other race alone (NH)	0	9	0.00%	0.26%
Mixed race or Multiracial (NH)	27	53	0.79%	1.53%
Hispanic or Latino (any race)	89	79	2.60%	2.28%
Total	3,426	3,469	100.00%	100.00%
