= Centreville, Mississippi =

Centreville
- Town
- Location of Centreville, Mississippi

- Location in Mississippi Centreville (the United States)
- Coordinates: 31°5′9″N 91°3′54″W
- Country: United States
- State: Mississippi
- Counties: Wilkinson, Amite

Area
  - Total: 2.32 sq mi (6.00 km^{2})
  - Land: 2.32 sq mi (6.00 km^{2})
  - Water: 0 sq mi (0.00 km^{2})
- Elevation: 384 ft (117 m)

Population (2020)
  - Total: 1,258
  - Density: 543.2/sq mi (209.72/km^{2})
- Time zone: UTC-6 (Central (CST))
  - Summer (DST): UTC-5 (CDT)
- ZIP code: 39631
- Area code: 601
- FIPS code: 28-12740
- GNIS feature ID: 0668288
- Website: townofcentrevillems.org

Centreville is a town in Amite and Wilkinson counties, Mississippi, United States. It is part of the McComb, Mississippi micropolitan statistical area. Its population was 1,258 in 2020.

Bethany Presbyterian Church is a historic church in Centreville, built in 1855, and added to the National Register of Historic Places in 2003.

The town was incorporated in 1880, and it was a small settlement in the years prior. In 1880, the Yazoo and Mississippi Valley R.R. ran along the border between Wilkinson and Amite counties. Because the station was approximately midway between Liberty and Woodville and about midway between Natchez and Baton Rouge, it was appropriately named Centreville.

== Geography ==
Centreville is located within Wilkinson County, with a portion in adjacent Amite County. In the 2000 census, 1,433 of the town's 1,680 residents (85.3%) lived in Wilkinson County and 247 (14.7%) in Amite County.

According to the United States Census Bureau, the town has a total area of 2.3 square miles (6.0 km^{2}), all land.

== Demographics ==
Historical population
Census	Pop.	Note	%±
1900	590		—
1910	865		46.6%
1920	161		−81.4%
1930	134		−16.8%
1940	1,163		767.9%
1950	2,025		74.1%
1960	1,229		−39.3%
1970	1,819		48.0%
1980	1,844		1.4%
1990	1,771		−4.0%
2000	1,680		−5.1%
2010	1,684		0.2%
2020	1,258		−25.3%
U.S. Decennial Census

=== Racial and ethnic composition ===
Centreville town, Mississippi – Racial and ethnic composition Note: the US Census treats Hispanic/Latino as an ethnic category. This table excludes Latinos from the racial categories and assigns them to a separate category. Hispanics/Latinos may be of any race.
Race / Ethnicity (NH = Non-Hispanic)	Pop 2000	Pop 2010	Pop 2020	% 2000	% 2010	% 2020
White alone (NH)	543	392	322	32.32%	23.28%	25.60%
Black or African American alone (NH)	1,131	1,286	897	67.32%	76.37%	71.30%
Native American or Alaska Native alone (NH)	1	0	3	0.06%	0.00%	0.24%
Asian alone (NH)	0	0	1	0.00%	0.00%	0.08%
Native Hawaiian or Pacific Islander alone (NH)	0	0	0	0.00%	0.00%	0.00%
Other race alone (NH)	0	0	5	0.00%	0.00%	0.40%
Mixed race or Multiracial (NH)	1	1	24	0.06%	0.06%	1.91%
Hispanic or Latino (any race)	4	5	6	0.24%	0.30%	0.48%
Total	1,680	1,684	1,258	100.00%	100.00%	100.00%

=== 2000 census ===
According to the 2020 United States census, there were 1,258 people, 724 households, and 374 families residing in the town; the racial and ethnic composition of the town was 71.3% Black and African American, 25.6% non-Hispanic white, 0.24% Native American, 0.08% Asian, 2.31% multiracial or of another race/ethnicity, and 0.48% Hispanic or Latino of any race in 2020. According to the 2020 American Community Survey, its median household income was $30,682.

== Education ==
Most of Centreville is served by the Wilkinson County School District, although the portion that lies in Amite County is served by the Amite County School District.

Private schools:

- Centreville Academy

Both Amite and Wilkinson counties are in the district of Southwest Mississippi Community College.

== Notable people ==
- Robert P. Briscoe, World War II Navy Cross recipient and US Navy four-star Admiral
- William A. Dickson, U.S. Representative from 1909 to 1913
- Girault M. Jones, seventh Bishop of Louisiana in The Episcopal Church
- John N. Kennedy, United States Senator from Louisiana
- Albert Lewis, Hall of Fame member of the Kansas City Chiefs; retired to a ranch in Centreville.
- Anne Moody, civil rights activist and author of Coming of Age in Mississippi
- Melanie Sojourner, member of the Mississippi State Senate
- Louis Leon Thurstone, psychologist
- Kevin Windham, pro motocross, supercross racer
