= Gloster, Mississippi =

Gloster
- Location of Gloster, Mississippi

- Location in Mississippi Gloster (the United States)
- Coordinates: 31°11′49″N 91°1′9″W
- Country: United States
- State: Mississippi
- County: Amite

Government
  - Mayor: Wayne Jerry Norwood

Area
  - Total: 1.82 sq mi (4.72 km^{2})
  - Land: 1.82 sq mi (4.72 km^{2})
  - Water: 0 sq mi (0.00 km^{2})
- Elevation: 423 ft (129 m)

Population (2020)
  - Total: 897
  - Density: 491.8/sq mi (189.88/km^{2})
- Time zone: UTC-6 (Central (CST))
  - Summer (DST): UTC-5 (CDT)
- ZIP code: 39638
- Area code: 601
- FIPS code: 28-27820
- GNIS feature ID: 0693304
- Website: www.amitecounty.ms/cities/gloster.php

Gloster is a town in central Amite County, Mississippi, United States. The population was 897 at the 2020 census.

== History ==
Gloster was incorporated on March 11, 1884.

It was largely founded as a railroad town. Gloster was named after the engineer who put the Yazoo and Mississippi Valley R.R. through in the 1880s.

Drax Biomass operates a 450,000-metric-ton (440,000-long-ton) per year wood pellet production facility in Gloster. The facility was expected to create 45 jobs, and is called Amite BioEnergy.

=== Economic revival ===
Governor Tate Reeves of Mississippi came down to Gloster to announce Claw Forestry Services will build a $200 million sawmill on about 50 acres comprising the former Georgia-Pacific mill site and the adjoining former elementary school property. The elementary school has been closed for many years. Mayor Jerry Norwood said the announcement is "one of the proudest moments in my life, and my proudest moment as mayor."

William VanDevender, chief executive officer of Claw, said once the plant is up and running, it should produce about 250 million board-feet of lumber a year, using about 1 million tons of logs annually, and make sales of more than $100 million a year. VanDevender and other Claw officials "recognize the quality of the workforce and the quality of the timber basket in Southwest Mississippi," Reeves said after the presentation. "This will benefit not just the 130 families that have workers at the plant, but boost timber owners across a four to five-county region."

Governor Reeves said he "expects Southwest Mississippi Community College will play a large role in providing training for employees at the plant.

Gloster Forestry announced: "In connection with the new sawmill facility, efforts are underway to resume operation of the Gloster Southern Railroad to further revitalize industry and jobs in the underserved community."

The new sawmill facility started operation in 2024. Also a grant of $52,000,000 was received to rebuild the Gloster Southern Railroad on the existing right-of-way.

== Demographics ==
Historical population
Census	Pop.	Note	%±
1890	1,142		—
1900	1,661		45.4%
1910	1,486		−10.5%
1920	1,079		−27.4%
1930	1,139		5.6%
1940	1,232		8.2%
1950	1,467		19.1%
1960	1,369		−6.7%
1970	1,401		2.3%
1980	1,726		23.2%
1990	1,323		−23.3%
2000	1,073		−18.9%
2010	960		−10.5%
2020	897		−6.6%
U.S. Decennial Census

=== Racial and ethnic composition ===
Gloster town, Mississippi – Racial and ethnic composition Note: the US Census treats Hispanic/Latino as an ethnic category. This table excludes Latinos from the racial categories and assigns them to a separate category. Hispanics/Latinos may be of any race.
Race / Ethnicity (NH = Non-Hispanic)	Pop 2000	Pop 2010	Pop 2020	% 2000	% 2010	% 2020
White alone (NH)	467	319	230	43.52%	33.23%	25.64%
Black or African American alone (NH)	584	618	633	54.43%	64.38%	70.57%
Native American or Alaska Native alone (NH)	0	1	3	0.00%	0.10%	0.33%
Asian alone (NH)	0	0	1	0.00%	0.00%	0.11%
Native Hawaiian or Pacific Islander alone (NH)	0	1	0	0.00%	0.10%	0.00%
Other race alone (NH)	0	0	1	0.00%	0.00%	0.11%
Mixed race or Multiracial (NH)	3	3	13	0.28%	0.31%	1.45%
Hispanic or Latino (any race)	19	18	16	1.77%	1.88%	1.78%
Total	1,073	960	897	100.00%	100.00%	100.00%

=== 2020 census ===
According to the 2020 census, there were 897 people in Gloster. As of the census of 2010, there were 960 people, 223 households, and 114 families residing in the town.

=== 2010 census ===
In 2010, the racial makeup of the town was 54.99% African American, 44.18% White, 0.56% from other races, and 0.28% from two or more races. Hispanic or Latino of any race were 1.77% of the population. In 2020, the racial makeup was 70.57% African American, 25.64% non-Hispanic white, 0.33% Native American, 1.56% other or mixed, and 1.78% Hispanic or Latino of any race.

== Education ==
Gloster is in the Amite County School District.

== Notable people ==
- Carl Augustus Hansberry, civil rights activist and real estate broker, father of playwright Lorraine Hansberry, litigant in Hansberry v. Lee (1940)
- William Leo Hansberry, scholar and Afrocentrist, professor at Howard University, brother of Carl Hansberry
- Rita Martinson – American politician (born 1937)
- Leon Perry – American football player (born 1957)
- Barney Poole – American football player (1923–2005)
- Jim Poole – American football player (1915–1994)
- Ray Poole – American football player (1921–2008)
- Lee Robinson – American football player (born 1987)

== See also ==
- List of towns in Mississippi
