= National Register of Historic Places listings in Lawrence County, Mississippi =

Location of Lawrence County in Mississippi

This is a list of the National Register of Historic Places listings in Lawrence County, Mississippi.

This is intended to be a complete list of the properties and districts on the National Register of Historic Places in Lawrence County, Mississippi, United States. Latitude and longitude coordinates are provided for many National Register properties and districts; these locations may be seen together in a map.

There are 31 properties and districts listed on the National Register in the county.

This National Park Service list is complete through NPS recent listings posted October 30, 2026.

== Current listings ==
	Name on the Register	Image	Date listed	Location	City or town	Description
1	Armstrong-Lee House		September 29, 1980 (#80002262)	Mississippi Highway 43; 31°30′26″N 90°01′57″W	Monticello	
2	Bahala Creek Bridge	Bahala Creek Bridge	November 16, 1988 (#88002417)	Spans Bahala Creek on a county road, southwest of Oma; 31°42′17″N 90°12′00″W	Oma	
3	Boyd-Cothern House		September 29, 1980 (#80002258)	West of Jayess; 31°21′34″N 90°13′29″W	Jayess	
4	Buckley House	Buckley House	September 29, 1980 (#80002267)	West of New Hebron; 31°44′09″N 90°00′13″W	New Hebron	
5	Bush House		September 29, 1980 (#80002268)	East of New Hebron on Mississippi Highway 42; 31°43′36″N 89°58′49″W	New Hebron	
6	Cannon House		September 29, 1980 (#80002263)	Mississippi Highway 43; 31°30′51″N 90°02′09″W	Monticello	
7	Crane-Mason House		September 29, 1980 (#80002264)	Southwest of Monticello; 31°29′09″N 90°14′24″W	Monticello	
8	Douglas House		September 29, 1980 (#80002275)	East of Sontag; 31°38′53″N 90°10′30″W	Sontag	
9	Fox House		September 29, 1980 (#80002277)	Northeast of Wanilla; 31°39′14″N 90°07′34″W	Wanilla	
10	George Mound (22LW591)	George Mound (22LW591)	March 1, 1987 (#87000138)	Address restricted	Oma	
11	Gunnell House		September 29, 1980 (#80002259)	West of Topeka; 31°25′35″N 90°14′25″W	Jayess	
12	Hilliard House	Hilliard House	September 29, 1980 (#80002278)	Northeast of Wanilla; 31°39′55″N 90°07′23″W	Wanilla	
13	Johnson-White House		September 29, 1980 (#80002276)	East of Sontag; 31°38′52″N 90°11′06″W	Sontag	
14	Knapp-Stephens House		September 29, 1980 (#80002269)	Southwest of New Hebron; 31°39′02″N 90°01′28″W	New Hebron	
15	Lawrence County Courthouse	Lawrence County Courthouse	March 4, 1993 (#93000146)	Northern side of Broad St. between Jefferson and Washington Sts. 31°33′14″N 90°06′17″W	Monticello	
16	Longino House	Longino House	August 21, 1972 (#72000697)	Caswell St. 31°33′13″N 90°06′10″W	Monticello	
17	Lowe-Steen Site (22LW511)	Lowe-Steen Site (22LW511)	March 1, 1987 (#87000134)	Address restricted	Monticello	
18	Mill Creek Site	Mill Creek Site	June 9, 1978 (#78001609)	Address restricted	Monticello	
19	Monticello Consolidated School		July 9, 1991 (#91000879)	125 E. Broad St. 31°33′14″N 90°06′29″W	Monticello	
20	New Orleans Great Northern Railroad Depot	New Orleans Great Northern Railroad Depot	October 31, 1995 (#95001193)	Bounded by U.S. Highway 84 and the former Gulf, Mobile and Ohio railroad tracks 31°33′19″N 90°06′45″W	Monticello	
21	Newsom-Lane House		September 29, 1980 (#80002270)	Mississippi Highway 43; 31°43′15″N 89°59′01″W	New Hebron	
22	Newsom-Smith House		September 29, 1980 (#80002271)	Mississippi Highway 43; 31°44′26″N 89°58′42″W	New Hebron	
23	Price-Stephens House		September 29, 1980 (#80002272)	Mississippi Highway 43; 31°40′01″N 90°03′28″W	New Hebron	
24	River Road		March 11, 2011 (#11000108)	Between Mississippi Highway 43 and Conerly Rd. 31°28′19″N 90°01′46″W	Oak Vale vicinity	
25	Robbins House		September 29, 1980 (#80002260)	East of Topeka; 31°24′51″N 90°06′15″W	Jayess	
26	Rogers House		September 29, 1980 (#80002274)	South of Silver Creek; 31°32′47″N 90°00′05″W	Silver Creek	
27	A.L. Smith House		September 29, 1980 (#80002265)	North of Monticello on Mississippi Highway 27; 31°35′42″N 90°06′08″W	Monticello	
28	Stringer House		September 29, 1980 (#80002273)	Southwest of New Hebron; 31°41′47″N 90°02′53″W	New Hebron	
29	June and Nora Thompson House		July 27, 2005 (#05000739)	Sutton Rd., 0.3 miles (0.48 km) north of its junction with Crooked Creek Rd. 31°43′37″N 90°01′15″W	New Hebron	
30	Tynes House		September 29, 1980 (#80002261)	East of Topeka; 31°25′00″N 90°10′03″W	Jayess	
31	Wilson House		September 29, 1980 (#80002266)	Southwest of Monticello; 31°29′16″N 90°13′56″W	Monticello	

== See also ==
- List of National Historic Landmarks in Mississippi
- National Register of Historic Places listings in Mississippi
