= Silver Creek, Mississippi =

- Town
- Location of Silver Creek, Mississippi

- Location in the United States
- Coordinates: 31°36′17″N 90°0′6″W
- Country: United States
- State: Mississippi
- County: Lawrence

Area
  - Total: 1.49 sq mi (3.87 km^{2})
  - Land: 1.49 sq mi (3.87 km^{2})
  - Water: 0 sq mi (0.00 km^{2})
- Elevation: 269 ft (82 m)

Population (2020)
  - Total: 175
  - Density: 117.2/sq mi (45.25/km^{2})
- Time zone: UTC-6 (Central (CST))
  - Summer (DST): UTC-5 (CDT)
- ZIP code: 39663
- Area codes: 601, 769
- FIPS code: 28-67960
- GNIS feature ID: 0677792

Silver Creek is a town in Lawrence County, Mississippi, United States. As of the 2020 census, Silver Creek had a population of 175. Silver Creek is accessed from U.S. Route 84 and Mississippi Highway 43. The film Jesse James' Women (1954) was filmed in Silver Creek.

== History ==
The area was settled around 1820 by the Kirby, Neal, Longino, Price and Williams families. Originally named "The Hall", it was changed in 1893 to Silver Creek for a nearby stream.

A depot was established in Silver Creek when the Pearl & Leaf Rivers Railroad (later Illinois Central Railroad) was completed in 1903.

In 1993, the Illinois Central Railroad abandoned the former Illinois Central line. The Columbia and Silver Creek Railroad was a shortline railroad that operated between Silver Creek and Columbia until 1992. The Rogers House, south of Silver Creek, is listed on the National Register of Historic Places.

== Geography ==
Silver Creek is located in eastern Lawrence County at 31°36′17″N 90°0′6″W (31.604656, -90.001588). U.S. Route 84 runs along the southern edge of the town, leading southwest 7 miles (11 km) to Monticello, the county seat, and east 8 miles (13 km) to Prentiss. Mississippi Highway 43 runs through the center of Silver Creek as Front Street, leading north 9 miles (14 km) to New Hebron. Highway 43A leads south from Silver Creek 8 miles (13 km) to Arm.

According to the United States Census Bureau, the town of Silver Creek has a total area of 1.5 square miles (3.9 km^{2}), all land. The eastern border of the town is a waterway called Silver Creek; it is a south-flowing tributary of the Pearl River.

== Demographics ==
Historical population
Census	Pop.	Note	%±
1910	544		—
1920	252		−53.7%
1930	341		35.3%
1940	278		−18.5%
1950	275		−1.1%
1960	229		−16.7%
1970	257		12.2%
1980	272		5.8%
1990	190		−30.1%
2000	209		10.0%
2010	210		0.5%
2020	175		−16.7%
U.S. Decennial Census

As of the census of 2000, there were 209 people, 81 households, and 60 families residing in the town. The population density was 197.0 inhabitants per square mile (76.1/km^{2}). There were 96 housing units at an average density of 90.5 per square mile (34.9/km^{2}). The racial makeup of the town was 93.30% White, 1.91% African American, 2.87% Asian, and 1.91% from two or more races.

There were 81 households, out of which 34.6% had children under the age of 18 living with them, 58.0% were married couples living together, 12.3% had a female householder with no husband present, and 24.7% were non-families. 24.7% of all households were made up of individuals, and 13.6% had someone living alone who was 65 years of age or older. The average household size was 2.58 and the average family size was 2.98.

In the town, the population was spread out, with 26.8% under the age of 18, 5.3% from 18 to 24, 28.2% from 25 to 44, 23.4% from 45 to 64, and 16.3% who were 65 years of age or older. The median age was 36 years. For every 100 females, there were 90.0 males. For every 100 females age 18 and over, there were 93.7 males.

The median income for a household in the town was $32,656, and the median income for a family was $35,625. Males had a median income of $29,063 versus $19,375 for females. The per capita income for the town was $12,507. About 6.2% of families and 13.4% of the population were below the poverty line, including 8.0% of those under the age of eighteen and 17.1% of those 65 or over.

== Education ==
The town of Silver Creek is served by the Lawrence County School District.

== Notable people ==
- I.V. Barnes, baseball player with the Kansas City Monarchs in the Negro leagues during the 1930s
- Alice Rose George, writer, poet, curator, photography editor
- Virgil A. Griffith, justice of the Supreme Court of Mississippi from 1928 to 1949
- Curtis L. Waller, lawyer, politician, and judge
