= Mississippi Highway 43 =

State Highway in Mississippi

Mississippi Highway 43
- Segments of MS 43 in red, MS 43 Spur in blue, MS 43A in purple

Route information
- Length: 235.526 mi (379.042 km)
- Existed: 1949–present

Southern segment
- Length: 83.2 mi (133.9 km)
- South end: US 90 in Bay Saint Louis
- Major intersections: I-10 in Bay Saint Louis; I-59 in Picayune; US 11 in Picayune
- North end: MS 13 in Lampton

Middle segment
- Length: 51.8 mi (83.4 km)
- South end: MS 13 near Oak Vale
- Major intersections: US 84 from Monticello to Silver Creek
- North end: MS 13 in Mendenhall

Northern segment
- Length: 108.7 mi (174.9 km)
- South end: MS 18 in Puckett
- Major intersections: I-20 in Pelahatchie; US 80 in Pelahatchie; MS 471 in Goshen Springs
- North end: Attala Road 3122 (Winfry Road) near Kilmichael

Location
- Country: United States
- State: Mississippi
- Counties: Hancock, Pearl River, Marion, Jefferson Davis, Lawrence, Simpson, Rankin, Madison, Leake, Attala

Highway system
- Mississippi State Highway System; Interstate; US; State
← MS 42	→ MS 44

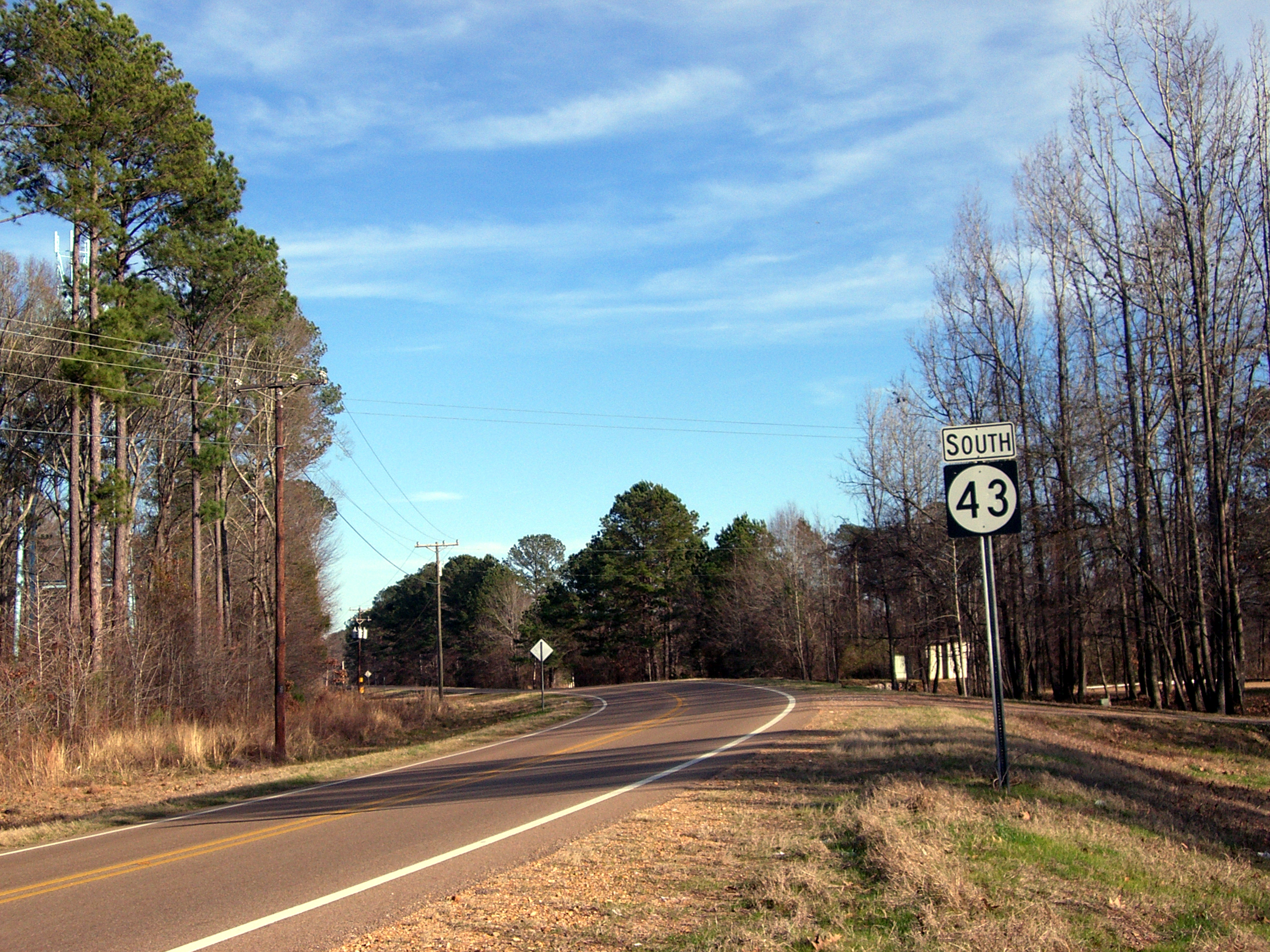
MS 43 as it passes through Goshen Springs, near the Ross Barnett Reservoir.

Mississippi Highway 43 (MS 43) is a state highway in Mississippi that generally runs north–south in three segments: the first from US 90 near Bay St. Louis to MS 13 south of Columbia, resuming at MS 13 in southern Jefferson Davis County to end near Mendenhall, and finally starting again at MS 18 near Puckett to end at Attala Road 3122 in northern Attala County. It traverses approximately 235 miles (378 km), serving Hancock, Pearl River, Marion, Jefferson Davis, Lawrence, Simpson, Rankin, Madison, Leake, and Attala counties.

== Route description ==
=== Southern segment ===
MS 43, concurrent with MS 603, begins in Hancock County just west of Bay St. Louis in Waveland at an intersection with US 90. The highway heads north through a business district as a four-lane undivided boulevard before widening to a divided highway as it leaves Waveland and curves to the northwest. MS 43/MS 603 pass through the suburban community of Shoreline Park for the next several miles to cross Bayou La Croix and have an interchange with I-10 at Exit 13. The heads northward through rural terrain for the next few miles, where it narrows to two-lanes and has an intersection with the access road for Stennis International Airport, which also houses many of the county's services. MS 43/MS 603 meet Texas Flat Road before crossing the Jourdan River and passing through the town of Kiln, where MS 43 splits from MS 603. MS 43 passes northwestward through rural areas (and the community of Wiehe) for several miles, crossing the Jourdan River for a second time, before entering Pearl River County.

MS 43 heads west through farmland to enter the city of Picayune, where it passes through neighborhoods before widening to a four-lane divided highway and coming to an interchange with I-59 (Exit 4), with MS 43 following I-59 north to Exit 6, where it crosses Hobolochitto Creek. MS 43 heads west from Exit 6 as a four-lane divided highway through a mix of neighborhoods and businesses to have an intersection with US 11. The highway narrows to two-lanes as it leaves Picayune, crossing Hobolochitto Creek again before having an intersection with MS 43 Spur (MS 992/Beech Street). MS 43 winds its way northwest through farmland and wooded areas for several miles, passing through the Cybur community, before turning northward and coming to an intersection with MS 26 at the Crossroads community.

The highway now parallels the Pearl River as it winds its way north through wooded areas for several miles to cross into Marion County, coming to an end shortly thereafter at an intersection with MS 13 between Columbia and Lumberton.

=== Middle segment ===
MS 43 begins in Jefferson Davis County at an intersection with MS 13 just north of Society Hill and heads west as a two-lane highway through woodlands to pass through Oak Vale, where it crosses into Lawrence County.

MS 43 turns northwest through farmland, passing through Arm, before crossing the Silver Creek and having an intersection with MS 43A. The highway continues northwest to have a short concurrency with MS 184, just across the Pearl River from Monticello, before joining US 84 east for a few miles. US 84/MS 43 enter the Silver Creek city limits at another intersection with MS 184 before MS 43 splits off at an intersection with MS 43A, winding its way through town along Front Street, where it has its final intersection with MS 184 (Southern Avenue). MS 43 leaves Silver Creek and heads northeast to enter New Hebron, where it passes through town along Jones Street, Main Avenue, and Franklin Street, having intersections with both MS 915 (unsigned/Jones Street) and MS 42 (Indiana Avenue). The highway heads north to leave New Hebron and straddle the line with Jefferson Davis County before crossing into Simpson County.

MS 43 heads northeast through a mix of woods and farmland as it has an intersection with MS 478 and passes through Shivers. It then comes to an intersection with MS 28, which it briefly follows westward as it has an intersection with MS 472 and passes through Pinola. The highway winds it way northeast as it parallels the Strong River for several miles before entering Mendenhall and immediately coming to an end at another intersection with MS 13 just west of downtown.

=== Northern segment ===
MS 43 begins in Rankin County in Puckett at an intersection with MS 18 just northwest of downtown. It winds its way northward as a two-lane highway through farmland for several miles to have an interchange with I-20 (Exit 68) before passing through Pelahatchie, where it has an intersection with US 80. The highway winds its way northwest to have an intersection with MS 481 before passing through Sand Hill, Koch (where it has an interchange with MS 25), and Goshen Springs (where it has an intersection with MS 471) before crossing a Causeway over the Ross Barnett Reservoir (part of the Pearl River) into Madison County.

MS 43 immediately has an interchange with the Natchez Trace Parkway at Madisonville before passing northward through Canton, bypassing downtown along its eastern side while having a short concurrency with MS 16. The highway now turns northeast through mostly wooded areas for the next several miles, where it passes through Sharon, before crossing into Leake County.

MS 43 begins paralleling the Natchez Trace as it passes through the community of Thomastown, where it has a junction with MS 429, before continuing northeast for several more miles before crossing into Attala County.

MS 43 becomes concurrent with MS 14 for a couple of miles to enter the Kosciusko outskirts, where it follows a beltway around downtown while having an intersection with MS 735 and concurrencies with MS 12, MS 19, and MS 35. The highway heads north out of Kosciusko through remote terrain for several miles to the Montgomery County line, where MS 43 comes to an end at an intersection with Winfry Road.

Access to MS 407 can be achieved via a right onto Winfry Road for a 0.5 miles (0.80 km) before turning left onto Ellis Road for 4.5 miles (7.2 km).

== Major intersections ==
County	Location	mi	km	Destinations	Notes
Hancock	Waveland	0.0	0.0	US 90 / Nicholson Avenue – Bay St. Louis, New Orleans, Buccaneer State Park, Beaches	Southern terminus of MS 43 and MS 603; southern end of MS 603 overlap
Hancock		5.4– 5.5	8.7– 8.9	I-10 – New Orleans, Mobile	I-10 exit 13
Hancock	Kiln	11.2	18.0	MS 603 north	Northern end of MS 603 overlap
Pearl River	Picayune	28.9	46.5	I-59 south – Picayune, New Orleans	Southern end of I-59 overlap; MS 43 south follows exit 4
Pearl River	Picayune	30.6	49.2	I-59 north – Hattiesburg	Northern end of I-59 overlap; MS 43 north follows exit 6
Pearl River	Picayune	32.3	52.0	US 11 – Picayune, Poplarville	
Pearl River		34.4	55.4	Beech Street (MS 992 south)	Northern terminus of MS 43 Spur (MS 992)
Pearl River	Crossroads	52.9	85.1	MS 26 – Bogalusa, Poplarville	
Marion		83.2	133.9	MS 13 – Columbia, Lumberton	Northern terminus of southern section of MS 43
Gap in route
Jefferson Davis		0.0	0.0	MS 13 – Prentiss, Columbia	Southern terminus of middle section of MS 43
Lawrence		13.1	21.1	MS 43A north – Silver Creek	Southern terminus of MS 43A
Lawrence		17.0	27.4	MS 184 west – Monticello	Southern end of MS 184 overlap
Lawrence		17.7	28.5	MS 184 east	Northern end of MS 184 overlap
Lawrence		18.1	29.1	US 84 west – Monticello, Brookhaven	Southern end of US 84 overlap
Lawrence		19.1	30.7	MS 184 west – Monticello	Eastern terminus of Monticello section of MS 184
Lawrence		21.8	35.1	US 84 east / MS 184 begins – Silver Creek	Western terminus of Silver Creek section of MS 184
Lawrence		22.7	36.5	MS 184 east – Prentiss MS 43A south – Arm	Northern end of MS 184 overlap; northern terminus of MS 43A
Lawrence	Silver Creek	23.6	38.0	MS 184 (Southern Avenue)	
Lawrence	New Hebron	32.6	52.5	Jones Street (MS 915 north) to MS 42	Southern terminus of MS 915
Lawrence	New Hebron	33.0	53.1	MS 42 (Indiana Avenue) – Prentiss	
Simpson	Shivers	37.0	59.5	MS 478 west	Eastern terminus of MS 478
Simpson		42.8	68.9	MS 28 east – Magee	Southern end of MS 28 overlap
Simpson		43.4	69.8	MS 472 west	Eastern terminus of MS 472
Simpson	Pinola	44.2	71.1	MS 28 west – Hazlehurst	Northern end of MS 28 overlap
Simpson	Mendenhall	51.8	83.4	MS 13 – Mendenhall, Jackson, Prentiss	Northern terminus of middle section of MS 43
Gap in route
Rankin	Puckett	0.0	0.0	MS 18 – Puckett, Brandon, Jackson	Southern terminus of southern section of MS 43
Rankin	Pelahatchie	16.2– 16.4	26.1– 26.4	I-20 – Jackson, Meridian	I-20 exit 68
Rankin	Pelahatchie	17.4	28.0	US 80 – Brandon, Morton	
Rankin		27.2	43.8	MS 481 south – Leesburg, Morton	Northern terminus of MS 481
Rankin	Koch	33.1– 33.4	53.3– 53.8	MS 25 – Jackson, Carthage	Interchange
Rankin		35.9	57.8	MS 471 south – Brandon	Northern terminus of MS 471
Madison	Madisonville	39.5– 39.8	63.6– 64.1	Natchez Trace Parkway	Interchange
Madison	Canton	45.2	72.7	MS 16 west (Canton Parkway) to I-55 / US 51	Southern end of MS 16 overlap
Madison	Canton	46.4	74.7	MS 16 east (East Peace Street) – Downtown Canton, Carthage	Northern end of MS 16 overlap
Madison		61.0	98.2	MS 17 – Camden, Pickens	
Leake	Thomastown	74.5	119.9	MS 429 – Sallis, Carthage	
Attala		86.3	138.9	MS 14 west – Newport, Goodman	Southern end of MS 14 overlap
Attala		87.1	140.2	MS 14 east / South Natchez Street – Kosciusko, Louisville	Northern end of MS 14 overlap
Attala		88.9	143.1	MS 12 west – Durant	Southern end of MS 12 overlap
Attala		89.3	143.7	MS 735 north – Downtown Kosciusko	Southern terminus of MS 735; old MS 12
Attala	Kosciusko	91.6	147.4	MS 19 north / MS 35 north (North Jackson Street) – Vaiden, Kosciusko	Southern end of MS 19 / MS 35 overlap
Attala	Kosciusko	91.8	147.7	MS 12 east / MS 19 south / MS 35 south – Ackerman	Northern end of MS 12 / MS 19 / MS 35 overlap
Attala		108.7	174.9	Winfry Road / County Road 3122	To MS 407; northern terminus of northern section of MS 43; end of state maintenance; intersection located along Montgomery County line
1.000 mi = 1.609 km; 1.000 km = 0.621 mi: Concurrency terminus

== Related routes ==
=== Highway 43 Spur ===
Mississippi Highway 43 Spur
- Location: Picayune
- Length: 1.350 mi (2.173 km)

MS 43 Spur, officially inventoried as Mississippi Highway 992 (MS 992), is a short local road which runs through Picayune, Mississippi. Its northern terminus is at MS 43 and its southern terminus is just north of Goodyear Boulevard in Picayune. In accordance with its MS 992 designation, MS 43 Spur is the highest numbered state highway in the entire state of Mississippi.

The entire route is in Pearl River County.

Location	mi	km	Destinations	Notes
Picayune	0.00	0.00	N Beech Street/Goodyear Boulevard	End of state maintenance; southern terminus; road continues as N Beech Street
	1.35	2.17	MS 43 – Kiln, Columbia	Northern terminus
1.000 mi = 1.609 km; 1.000 km = 0.621 mi

=== Highway 43A ===
Mississippi Highway 43A
- Location: Lawrence County
- Length: 5.6 mi (9.0 km)

Mississippi Highway 43A (MS 43A) is an unsigned 5.6-mile-long (9.0 km) alternate route of MS 43 in Lawrence County, Mississippi.

MS 43A begins at an intersection with MS 43 just northwest of the community of Arm. It heads north through rural areas, running parallel to the Silver Creek, for several miles to enter the town of Silver Creek and come to an end at an intersection with MS 184/MS 43. The entire route of MS 43A is a two-lane highway. The route is not legally defined in Mississippi Code § 65-3-3, and is a county road and city street not maintained by MDOT. A single MS 43A shield sign exists at the northern terminus at MS 184 in Silver Creek.

Major intersections

The entire route is in Lawrence County.

Location	mi	km	Destinations	Notes
	0.0	0.0	MS 43 – Monticello, Columbia	Southern terminus
	4.8	7.7	US 84 – Monticello, Prentiss	
Silver Creek	5.6	9.0	MS 43 / MS 184 – Monticello, New Hebron	Northern terminus
1.000 mi = 1.609 km; 1.000 km = 0.621 mi
