= Mississippi Highway 478 =

Highway in Mississippi

Mississippi Highway 478

Route information
- Maintained by MDOT
- Length: 7.0 mi (11.3 km)

Major junctions
- West end: MS 472 in Schley
- East end: MS 43 in Shivers

Location
- Country: United States
- State: Mississippi
- Counties: Simpson

Highway system
- Mississippi State Highway System; Interstate; US; State
← MS 477	→ MS 481

Mississippi Highway 478 (MS 478) is a highway in central Mississippi. Its western terminus is at MS 472 in Schley. It goes east, and its eastern terminus is at MS 43 in Shivers.

== Route description ==
MS 478 begins at MS 472 in Schley. It continues east towards Shivers and takes a slight right at the junction of Shivers Road. Its eastern terminus is at MS 43 in Shivers.

== Major intersections ==
The entire route is in Simpson County.

Location	mi	km	Destinations	Notes
Schley	0.00	0.00	MS 472 east / Lower Rockport Road / Rockport-New Hebron Road	Western terminus; western terminus of eastern segment of MS 472
Shivers	7.00	11.27	MS 43 – New Hebron, Mendenhall	Eastern terminus
1.000 mi = 1.609 km; 1.000 km = 0.621 mi
