= Mississippi Highway 540 =

State highway in Mississippi

Mississippi Highway 540

Route information
- Maintained by MDOT, Simpson County, City of Raleigh
- Length: 32.320 mi (52.014 km)
- Existed: 1958–present

Western segment
- Length: 10.576 mi (17.020 km)
- West end: MS 469 in Harrisville
- East end: MS 149 in D'Lo

Eastern segment
- Length: 21.744 mi (34.994 km)
- West end: MS 149 in Mendenhall
- Major intersections: US 49 in Mendenhall
- East end: MS 35 in Raleigh

Location
- Country: United States
- State: Mississippi
- Counties: Simpson, Smith

Highway system
- Mississippi State Highway System; Interstate; US; State
← MS 537	→ MS 541

Mississippi Highway 540 (MS 540) is a state highway through Simpson and Smith counties in central Mississippi. First created in 1958, the highway consists of two segments- one running about 10 1/2 miles (16.9 km) from Harrisville to D'Lo and a second 21.7-mile-long (34.9 km) road from Mendenhall to Raleigh.

== Route description ==
The western segment of MS 540 begins in the unincorporated community of Harrisville at an intersection with MS 469. The two-lane road heads through some curves descending in elevation, but eventually settles on an easterly course. MS 540 heads through wooded areas passing a few houses that were built along old alignments of the road. Changing to a slight east northeast heading, the highway crosses through wooded terrain with some rolling hills. The road's course changes back to due east as it changes its name to Jupiter Road and enters the town of D'Lo. After passing some houses, MS 540 crosses a railroad before the state highway ends at an intersection with MS 149 and East 4th Street.

MS 540's eastern segment begins at a T-intersection with MS 149 southeast of downtown Mendenhall, but still within the city limits. The road heads northeast and almost immediately intersects U.S. Route 49 (US 49), a divided highway. It changes to a more easterly course making several reverse curves as it heads through wooded areas. At the community of Martinville, the road reaches a four-way all-way stop intersection with MS 541. Immediately past this intersection, state maintenance of MS 540 ends and the road is county maintained for the next 0.2 miles (0.32 km). Continuing east, MS 540 heads through a mix of woods and open fields passing some houses along the way. The road curves to the northeast and enters Smith County. At the community of Traxler, the road heads through more rolling hills, passes a few churches, and crosses Oakohay Creek. MS 540 enters the city of Raleigh and shortly after crossing into city limits, state maintenance again ends. Heading past small houses, the highway, known as Cohay Road, heads east. Before reaching MS 35, the road makes a sharp curve to the north and then ends at a skewed intersection with MS 35.

== History ==
The first section of MS 540 formally designated as a part of the state highway system occurred in 1958. Dating back to 1956, a portion of current MS 540 west of Raleigh was part of MS 543. Originally, MS 540 had only run from MS 541 at Martinsville to a junction with MS 543 west of Raleigh. By 1960, MS 540 had taken over the state highway to Raleigh (MS 543 had been completely decommissioned) and along a newly designated highway west to US 49 in Mendenhall. After US 49 was relocated on a road bypassing Mendenhall around 1968, MS 540 was slightly extended along the former US 49 mainline through downtown Mendenhall to a point about 0.19 miles (0.31 km) northwest of its interchange with MS 13. This portion along former US 49 was removed from MS 540 when MS 149 was formally designated.

The western segment of MS 540 between Harrisville and D'Lo was created along some existing roads and newly constructed roads. Construction began in May 2004 on 9.8 miles (15.8 km) of new highway. Though part of the state highway system, the work was performed by Simpson County. The highway was completed in October 2006.

== Major intersections ==
County	Location	mi	km	Destinations	Notes
Simpson	Harrisville	0.000	0.000	MS 469	Western terminus
Simpson	D'Lo	10.576	17.020	MS 149 / East 4th Street	Eastern terminus of western segment
Simpson	Gap in route				
Simpson	Mendenhall	10.576	17.020	MS 149	Western terminus of eastern segment
Simpson	Mendenhall	10.722	17.255	US 49 – Jackson, Hattiesburg	
Simpson	Martinville	17.055	27.447	MS 541 – Magee, Puckett	
Smith	Raleigh	32.320	52.014	MS 35 (Magnolia Drive / Main Street) – Forest, Bay Springs, Mize	Eastern terminus
1.000 mi = 1.609 km; 1.000 km = 0.621 mi
