= Mississippi Highway 472 =

State highway in Mississippi

Mississippi Highway 472

Route information
- Maintained by MDOT and Simpson County
- Length: 25.825 mi (41.561 km)
- Existed: 1957–present

Western segment
- Length: 13.468 mi (21.675 km)
- West end: Whitworth Street near Hazlehurst
- East end: MS 27 in Rockport

Eastern segment
- Length: 12.357 mi (19.887 km)
- West end: MS 478 near Schley
- East end: MS 28 / MS 43 near Pinola

Location
- Country: United States
- State: Mississippi
- Counties: Copiah, Simpson

Highway system
- Mississippi State Highway System; Interstate; US; State
← MS 471	→ MS 473

Mississippi Highway 472 (MS 472) is a two-lane wide state highway in Copiah and Simpson counties, Mississippi. The highway consists of two segments- a western segment that runs from outside of Hazlehurst to Rockport that is signed and state maintained, and an eastern segment which is unsigned and maintained by Simpson County. The route number was created in 1957 and had once extended as far west as Carpenter.

== Route description ==
MS 472's western segment begins in the community of Shady Grove, about 2.6 miles (4.2 km) east of Hazlehust, at an intersection with East Whitworth Street. The cross road was previously MS 28, now located about 0.6 miles (0.97 km) to the north. State maintenance of the highway officially begins about 200 feet (61 m) beyond the center of this intersection. MS 472 heads southeast on a winding road through rolling terrain. For the first five miles (8.0 km), the highway heads through a mix of open fields and woods, with some small homes and churches being located along the road. After that point, the surroundings of the road become more rural with very few homes being present on the road. Before the segment ends, MS 472 reaches a T intersection with Rockport Road in front of a church. MS 472 turns to the east and continues for another 1 1/4 miles (2.0 km) where it ends at an intersection with MS 27 in the community of Rockport.

MS 472 officially resumes in Simpson County, across the Pearl River from Rockport. This section, however is not maintained by the state. The unsigned highway, but officially designated section, begins at the intersection of Shivers Road and Rockport New Hebron Road outside of the community of Schley and in front of an abandoned general store. Shivers Road to the east of this point carries MS 478, but like MS 472, it too is unsigned and not state maintained. MS 472 heads north along the county road before curving to the northeast and merging onto Bridgeport Road. At the community of Bridgeport, at a poultry farm, MS 472 turns onto a road formally named County 472. The road heads through a mostly wooded rural area, generally paralleling the Strong River. It also passes more poultry farms, small houses, and churches. In the community of Pinola, the road and the official state highway designation, ends at an intersection with MS 28 and MS 43.

== History ==
MS 472 was designed in 1957 along its current segments and an additional segment in northwest Copiah County. The additional segment ran from MS 18 at the community of Carpenter, just south of Utica Junior College. Portions of the road were improved to be paved over the next few years until the highway was completely removed from state maps by 1967. The route would not be restored to the state map until 1998, and was only located along the Shady Grove-Rockport segment. The road had not been formally decommissioned, however. County maps published by the state continued to show MS 472 through this time. At least in 1980, a 4.82-mile-long (7.76 km) portion of the eastern segment west from MS 28/MS 43 was state maintained.

== Major intersections ==
County	Location	mi	km	Destinations	Notes
Copiah	Shady Grove	0.000	0.000	Whitworth Street	Western terminus
Copiah	Rockport	13.468	21.675	MS 27 – Georgetown, Monticello	Eastern terminus of western segment
Gap in route
Simpson	Schley	13.468	21.675	MS 478 east (Shivers Road) / Rockport New Hebron Road	Western terminus of eastern segment; western terminus of MS 478
Simpson	Pinola	25.825	41.561	MS 28 / MS 43 – Pinola, Magee	Eastern terminus
1.000 mi = 1.609 km; 1.000 km = 0.621 mi
