= Alice Rose George =

American writer, poet, curator, and photography editor (1944–2020)

- fair use image only
- Born: October 23, 1944; Silver Creek, Mississippi
- Died: December 22, 2020; Los Angeles, California
- Occupation(s): Writer, poet, curator, photography editor

Alice Rose George (October 23, 1944 – December 22, 2020) was an American writer, poet, curator, and photography editor.

== Early life ==
Alice Rose George was born in Silver Creek, Mississippi, the daughter of James George and Louise Fairman George. Her parents were farmers; her mother was also a trained pianist. She learned to play piano and graduated from Monticello High School in 1962, and from H. Sophie Newcomb Memorial College in New Orleans in 1966, with a degree in English.

== Career ==
George was assistant photo editor at Time magazine in the late 1960s. Throughout her career in magazines (including Fortune and GEO), she nurtured and promoted early-career photographers, including Mitch Epstein, Peter Hujar, Duane Michals, Gilles Peress, Alec Soth, Nan Goldin, Jim Goldberg, Susan Meiselas, Lisa Kereszi, Philip-Lorca diCorcia, and Joel Sternfeld. In 1997, she was on the staff of the Center for Documentary Studies at Duke University. In the aftermath of the September 11 attacks, she co-curated an exhibition of professional and amateur photographs documenting life in New York City, with proceeds benefiting a relief fund; that show became a book, Here is New York.

George was also a poet whose work appeared in Bomb, The Paris Review, The New Republic, and The Atlantic, and in two collections, Ceiling of the World (1995) and Two Eyes (2015). She taught in the MFA program at the University of Hartford.

== Publications ==
- Flesh and Blood: Photographers' Images of Their Own Families (1992, photography, edited with Abigail Heyman and Ethan Hoffman)
- Ceiling of the World (1995, poems)
- A New Life: Stories and Photographs from the Suburban South (1997, co-edited with Alex Harris)
- Twenty-five and Under: Photographers (1997, co-edited with Robert Coles)
- Hope Photographs (1998, photography, with Lee Marks)
- Here is New York: A Democracy of Photographs (2002, photography, co-edited with Gilles Peress, Michael Shulan, and Charles H. Traub)
- Two Eyes (2015, poems)

== Personal life ==
George was living in Los Angeles at the time of her death in December 2020, from a head injury after a fall. She was 76 years old.
