= Oma, Mississippi =

- Unincorporated community
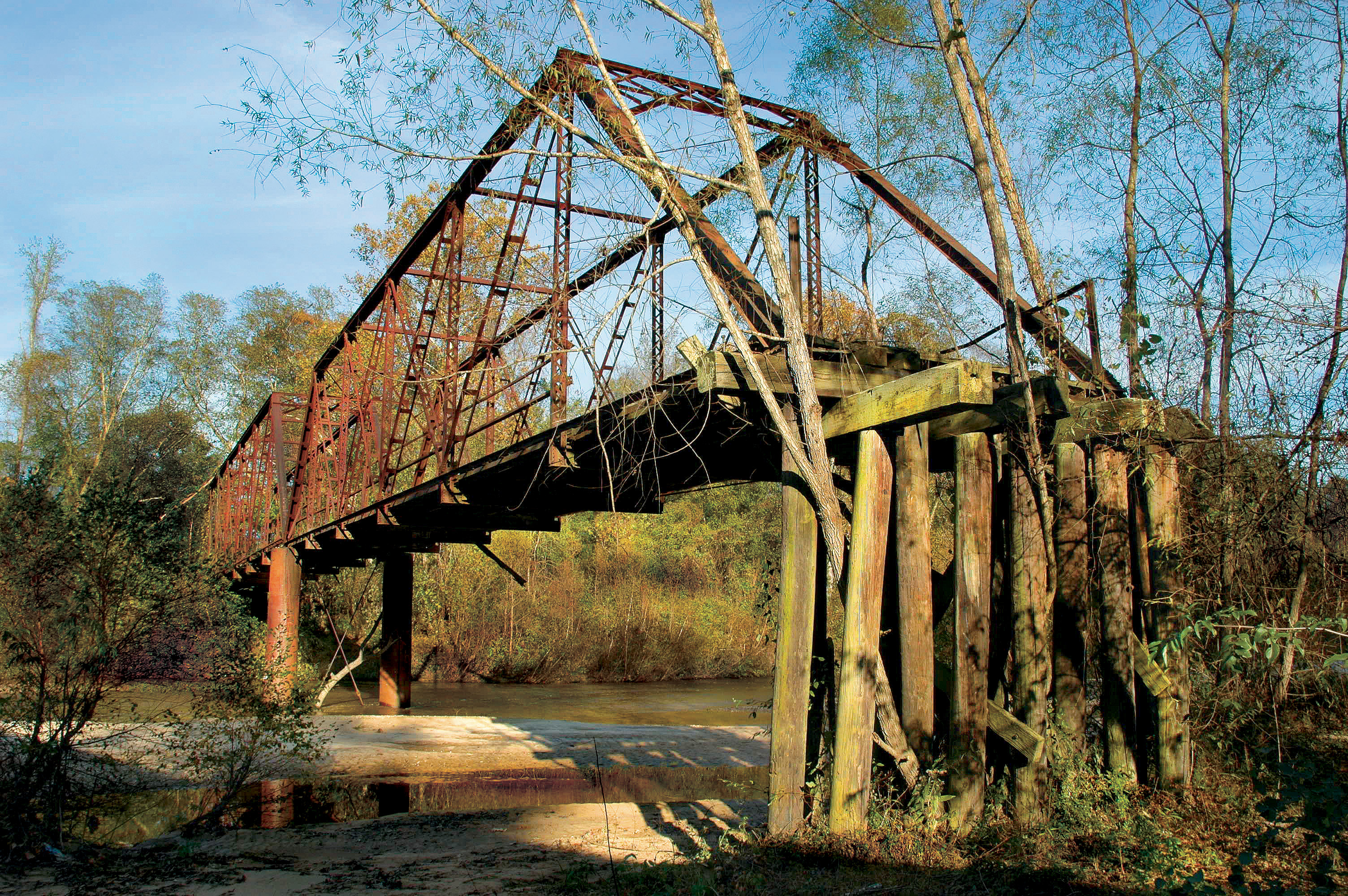
- The Bahala Creek Bridge

- Location within Mississippi Location within the United States
- Coordinates: 31°43′36.59″N 90°08′41.31″W
- Country: United States
- State: Mississippi
- County: Lawrence
- Elevation: 220 ft (67 m)
- Time zone: UTC-6 (Central (CST))
  - Summer (DST): UTC-5 (CDT)
- Area codes: 601 & 769
- GNIS feature ID: 692126

Oma is an unincorporated community in northern Lawrence County in the U.S. state of Mississippi. The community is located along Mississippi Highway 27, about a mile south of the Copiah County border and 12 miles (19 km) north of the Lawrence County seat of Monticello.

The community was established following the construction of a general store and New Orleans Great Northern Railroad train depot in 1906. Throughout the early 20th century, Oma experienced growth as a hub for the timber industry. Following the depletion of the timber resources, the community experienced decline. In 1967, it was estimated that about sixty people lived in Oma.

== Geography ==
The community is located along Mississippi Highway 27, about 12 miles (19 km) north of Monticello and about a mile and a half south of the Copiah County line. Bahala Creek passes through Oma.

== History ==
Prior to the community's foundation, the land was located on the upper line of territory granted by the 1805 Treaty of Mount Dexter, in which the Choctaws ceded land to the United States.

=== Foundation and growth ===
In 1906, the New Orleans Great Northern Railroad started laying tracks from Monticello into northeastern Lawrence County. That same year, Homer E. Little of nearby Rockport built a general store near the proposed location of the train depot. Newly married, Little named the community "Oma" after his bride, Naomi, who went by the name of Oma. Little's father in law, John B. Moore, was an early partner in the general store and was a co-founder of the community. The community garnered the nickname "the Little hamlet of Oma," after the founding Little family. Locals pronounce the name as "Omer."

A passenger train made its first ever scheduled stop in Oma in 1909, the same year that the historic Bahala Creek Bridge was constructed over Bahala Creek in the community's vicinity. A post office began operating in Oma in 1910, with the community's Baptist church constructed around the same year. The church was built in the Gothic architecture style that was commonplace for churches in the area at the time. Shortly thereafter, a commissary, cotton gin, school, hotel, and sawmill, in addition to the general store and post office, were present in Oma. A physician established a practice in the community as well.

Much of the community's industry was devoted to forestry, with trees being cleared to continue building more railroad tracks. The cultivation of corn and cotton was also a prominent industry. In the late 1920s, Harvey Young opened a wood veneer mill, which employed forty to fifty people. In 1932, the International Paperwood Company bought much of the surrounding land area to use for lumber.

=== Decline ===
Federal agricultural policies during the Great Depression decreased interest among farmers in cultivating the area, while forestry resources were being depleted due to overharvesting. By the early 1950s, the railroad, then named the Gulf, Mobile and Ohio Railroad, had ceased passenger service to Oma.

A 1967 article in The Clarion-Ledger estimated the community's population to be around sixty people. The post office was located inside the Little General Store, which also served as a community meeting place and voting precinct that served around 200 registered voters. The article noted that the sawmill, hotel, and cotton gin had been demolished, while the school had been merged into the school district of Monticello. The commissary building and veneer mill still stood, but had been abandoned.

The Oma Baptist Church closed in 1970, after its pastor moved away and attendance dwindled down to around eight to ten people. The decision was made amongst attendees to close the church. A 1982 article in The Clarion-Ledger highlighted the abandoned building.

Amid the encroaching trees and underbrush that seek to envelope [sic] the old church and hide it from sight, the white tower and steeple reach unobstructed toward the heavens. The small country church stands like an enchanted castle in a fairy tale that time forgot. ... Oma Baptist Church stood in the middle of the community as a witness of an era gone by. It carried on a silent vigil as the railroad community around it thrived, survived, and slowly died.

— Margaret Nagle, "Remnant of an era gone by", The Clarion-Ledger (July 12, 1982)

The post office ceased operation in 1974. The Illinois Central Gulf Railroad formally abandoned a stretch of railroad between Wanilla and Byram, which included Oma's station, in 1977. The Little General Store closed in February 1982. The George Mound, a prehistoric mound in the Oma vicinity, was listed on the National Register of Historic Places in 1987. The following year, the Bahala Creek Bridge was listed on the National Register for its architectural significance. The Pratt truss bridge represented a common style of bridges built in the 20th century in Mississippi.

== Education ==
The community, as with all of Lawrence County, falls under the jurisdiction of the Lawrence County School District, which operates Lawrence County High School in Monticello. Lawrence County, including Oma, also falls into the district of Copiah–Lincoln Community College in Wesson.

== Notable people ==
- Ahmad Hardy, college football player for the Missouri Tigers
- Thomas Jefferson Young, author
