= Little Bahala Creek =

Stream in Mississippi, U.S.

Coordinates: 31.7051652°N 90.2217547°W

Little Bahala Creek is a stream in the U.S. state of Mississippi. It is a tributary to Big Bahala Creek.

Bahala most likely is the Choctaw language word meaning "(standing) mulberry". A variant name is "Reed River".
