= Mississippi Highway 481 =

State highway in Mississippi

Mississippi Highway 481

Route information
- Maintained by MDOT and City of Morton
- Length: 35.487 mi (57.111 km)
- Existed: 1953–present

Major junctions
- South end: MS 35 near Burns
- I-20 near Morton; US 80 / MS 13 in Morton
- North end: MS 43 in West Leesburg

Location
- Country: United States
- State: Mississippi
- Counties: Smith, Scott, Rankin

Highway system
- Mississippi State Highway System; Interstate; US; State
← MS 478	→ MS 482

Mississippi Highway 481 (MS 481) is a state highway in the west-central region of Mississippi running just under 35 1/2 miles (57.1 km) in length, signed as a north–south highway. The highway, designated in 1953, runs from MS 35 in rural Smith County inside the Bienville National Forest to MS 43 in West Leesburg, Rankin County.

== Route description ==
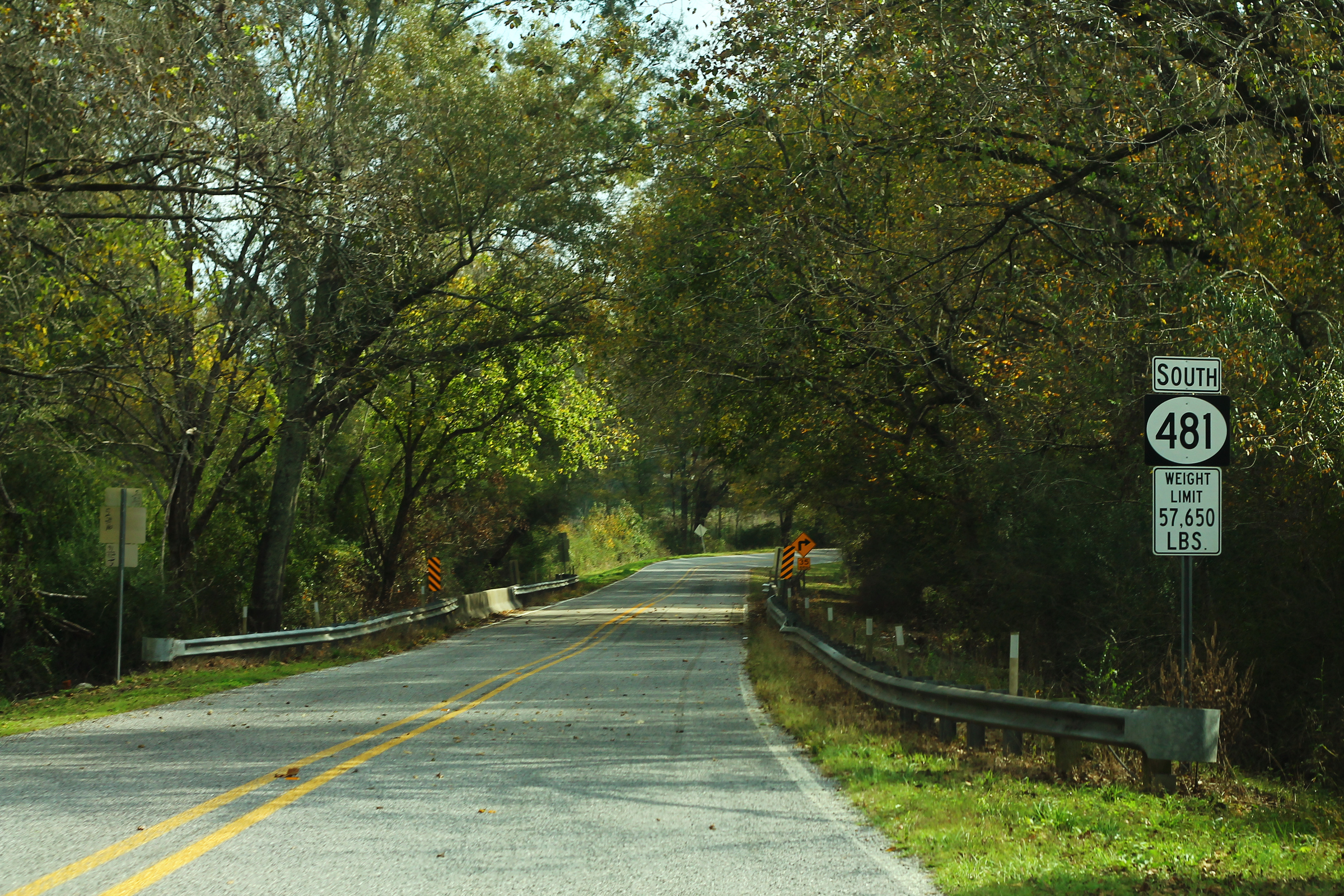
MS 481 southbound within the Bienville National Forest near MS 902

MS 481 begins at a rural T-intersection with MS 35 in the Bienville National Forest. The two-lane state highway heads west, making numerous S curves in a wooded area. Some houses and sheds line the road as well. In the settlement of Burns, the highway meets MS 902, a former connector of MS 481, at its southern terminus. MS 481 continues in a general westerly direction, through a more forested area, until turning north at the settlement of Trenton. The highway enters Scott County and continues north through the national forest. It reaches the unincorporated settlement of Pulaski where houses, churches, and a post office surround the settlement's main intersection. As MS 481 continues to head north, it reaches Interstate 20 (I-20) at a diamond interchange (exit 80) with no traveler's services provided in the vicinity.

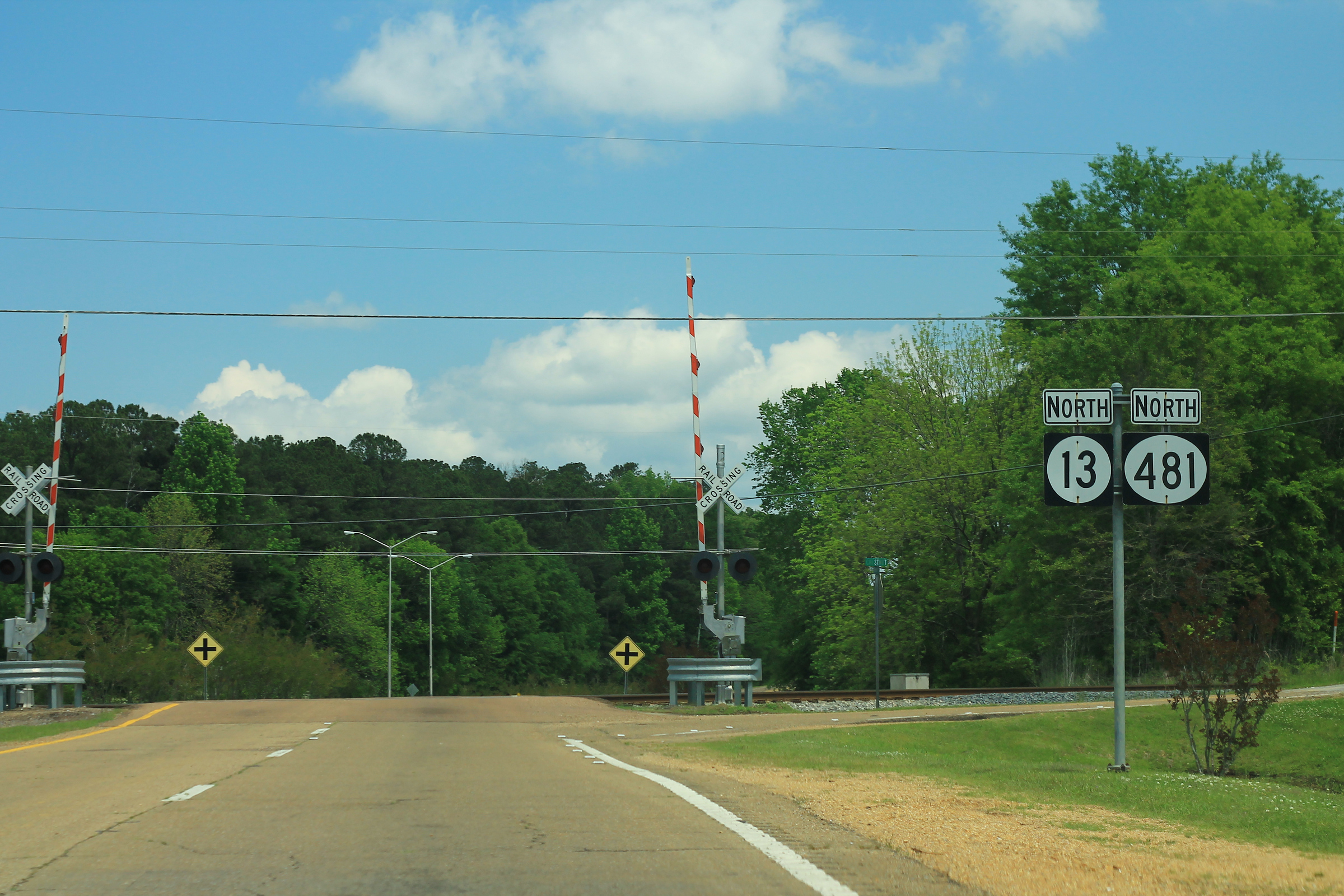
Concurrency of MS 481 and MS 13 in Morton

North of the interchange, MS 481 turns to the northwest. At the Morton city limits, the road name changes to Fifth Street, state maintenance ends, and city maintenance continues for the next 0.8 miles (1.3 km). This portion of the highway is signed "To MS 481" with shields and "Hwy 481 S" on street signs. Houses surround the highway inside the city limits. The road curves to due north where business begin to line the road. At a signalized intersection with U.S. Route 80 (US 80), MS 481 heads west along it forming a concurrency. At this point, the highway is two lanes, but includes a center turn lane. Less than one mile (1.6 km) later, US 80/MS 481 reach a four-way stop-controlled intersection with MS 13. MS 481 turns north along MS 13, a four-lane divided highway, first crossing a railroad at-grade before narrowing to a two-lane road. At the next intersection, MS 481 breaks off the MS 13 concurrency to head northwest along a two-lane road. Curving to the north, MS 481 reaches a clearing where farm fields surround the road. The state highway formally exits the national forest before curving to the west at the community of Branch. Crossing into Rankin County, MS 481 passes through Leesburg. Later, at the settlement of West Leesburg, also known as Billbros Corner, MS 481 reaches its end at MS 43.

== History ==
MS 481 was created in 1953 only running from MS 35 to Morton, though previously, the portion from Morton to West Leesburg had been part of the state highway system as a portion of MS 43. The extension of MS 481 north of Morton, restoring the road to the state highway system, occurred in 1956. A new bypass around the west side of Morton opened in 1974 and MS 481 was routed onto it. The rerouting led to the removal of a 0.7-mile-long (1.1 km) section of road, still officially named "Hwy 481 N," from the state highway system.

== Major intersections ==
County	Location	mi	km	Destinations	Notes
Smith		0.000	0.000	MS 35 – Forest, Raleigh	Southern terminus
Smith		2.102	3.383	MS 902 east – Forest	Western terminus of MS 902
Scott		17.954– 18.171	28.894– 29.243	I-20 – Meridian, Jackson	Exit 80 (I-20)
Scott	Morton	21.731	34.973	US 80 east	Southern end of US 80 concurrency
Scott	Morton	22.667	36.479	US 80 west / MS 13 south to I-20 – Jackson, Puckett, Roosevelt State Park	Northern end of US 80 concurrency; southern end of MS 13 concurrency; to Scott Regional Hospital
Scott	Morton	23.320	37.530	MS 13 north / Highway 481 N	Northern end of MS 13 concurrency
Rankin		35.487	57.111	MS 43 – Pisgah, Sand Hill, Pelahatchie, Ross Barnett Reservoir	Northern terminus
1.000 mi = 1.609 km; 1.000 km = 0.621 mi: Concurrency terminus
