= Harrisville, Mississippi =

- Unincorporated community
- Location within Mississippi Location within the United States
- Coordinates: 31°58′20″N 90°04′40″W
- Country: United States
- State: Mississippi
- County: Simpson
- Elevation: 420 ft (130 m)
- Time zone: UTC-6 (Central (CST))
  - Summer (DST): UTC-5 (CDT)
- ZIP code: 39082
- Area codes: 601 & 769
- GNIS feature ID: 670985

Harrisville is an unincorporated community in Simpson County, Mississippi, United States. Its zip code is 39082.

Harrisville sits mainly at the junction between Mississippi Highway 469, which connects to Florence and Pinola, and Highway 540, which connects to D'Lo. The community is part of the Jackson Metropolitan Statistical Area. The two main churches are the Harrisville United Methodist Church and the Harrisville Baptist Church.

In 1900, Harrisville had a population of 68 and had several stores, churches, and a cotton gin.

Harrisville is served by the Harrisville Volunteer Fire Department and the Harrisville Public Library.
