= Keith Daniels =

American football coach (1948–2000)

Biographical details
- Born: c. 1948; Monticello, Mississippi, U.S.
- Died: October 2, 2000 (aged 51–52); Hattiesburg, Mississippi, U.S.
- Education: Mississippi College (1969)

Playing career
- 1966–1967: Copiah–Lincoln
- 1968: Henderson State
- Position: Quarterback

Coaching career (HC unless noted)
- 1969: Monticello HS (MS) (assistant)
- 1970: McCluer Academy (MS)
- 1971–1974: Copiah Academy (MS)
- 1975 (spring): Rice (GA)
- 1975: Rice (RB)
- 1976: Heritage Academy (MS) (JV)
- 1977: Ole Miss (RB)
- 1978: East Tennessee State (RB)
- 1979: East Tennessee State (OC)
- 1980: Memphis State (QB)
- 1981: North Texas State (OC)
- 1982–1986: Southern Miss (OC)
- 1987–1988: Ole Miss (RB)
- 1989: Mississippi State (OC/QB)
- 1990–1991: Arkansas State (OC/RB)
- 1992–1994: Ole Miss (RB)
- 1995–2000: Pearl River

Head coaching record
- Overall: 21–34 (junior college); 27–19–2 (high school)

Keith J. Daniels (born c. 1948 – October 2, 2000) was an American college football coach. He was the head football coach for Pearl River Community College from 1995 until his death in October 2000.

== Early life and playing career ==
Daniels grew up in the late-1940s in Monticello, Mississippi. He attended Monticello High School where he played high school football. After his graduation in June 1966, he enrolled in Copiah–Lincoln Community College and played college football as a quarterback. After two seasons he transferred to Henderson State, but after two knee surgeries in three seasons ended his playing career, he transferred for a third time to Mississippi College. He received his degree from Mississippi College in 1969.

== Coaching career ==
While working on Daniel's degree with Mississippi College, he was an assistant football coach for his alma mater, Monticello High School. After one season he was hired as the head football coach for McCluer Academy. He served that position for one season and posted a 7–2–1 record. In 1971, he was hired away from McCluer and joined Copiah Academy as the team's second all-time head coach. In four seasons he led the school to a 20–17–1 record with his best team coming in his last season, 1974, as the team finished 8–3. He finished both his head coaching tenures with a combined record of 27–19–2.

In the spring of 1975, Daniels joined Rice as a graduate assistant. Before the season began he was promoted to ends coach before transitioning to running backs coach. After one season in the college ranks he was hired as the head junior varsity coach for Heritage Academy. He served that role for one season before becoming the running backs coach for Ole Miss.

In 1978, Daniels was hired as the running backs coach for East Tennessee State. He was promoted to offensive coordinator for the following season. In 1980, he resigned from East Tennessee State to become the quarterbacks coach for Memphis State. After one season he was hired as the offensive coordinator for North Texas State. In 1982, he was hired for the same position for Southern Miss. He maintained the role for five seasons, his longest tenured position to that point in his career, before he was hired for his second stint as the running backs coach for Ole Miss. After two seasons he was hired as the offensive coordinator and quarterbacks coach for Mississippi State. He resigned following the season. Daniels became the offensive coordinator for his fifth team as he was hired by Arkansas State alongside coaching the running backs. He was named interim head coach after Al Kincaid was fired. In 1992, he began his third stint as the Ole Miss running backs coach. Head coach Billy Brewer was fired after an investigation by the NCAA resulted in probation. He was retained under interim head coach Joe Lee Dunn, but was ultimately not retained when Tommy Tuberville was hired.

In 1995, Daniels was hired as the head football coach for Pearl River, replacing Willie Coats. He accepted the position with the reasoning that he was "tired of the instability at the major college level" and that he was tired of moving. In his first season he led the team to a 7–3 record and a three-way tie for second place in the Mississippi Association of Community and Junior Colleges (MACJC). Over the next four years the team finished 2–8 in 1996, 5–5 in 1997, 2–8 in 1998, and 3–7 in 1999. In 2000, Pearl River began the season with a 2–3 record before Daniels was hospitalized and subsequently died. He finished his tenure with a 21–34 record.

== Personal life and death ==
Daniels was married to Charlotte Hartzog and they had one daughter together. On October 2, 2000, Daniels was hospitalized after suffering a stroke at 5 a.m. He died later that day at Forrest General Hospital.

== Head coaching record ==
=== Junior college ===
Year	Team	Overall	Conference	Standing	Bowl/playoffs
Pearl River Wildcats (Mississippi Association of Community and Junior Colleges) (1995–2000)
1995	Pearl River	7–3	4–2	T–2nd (South)	
1996	Pearl River	2–8	1–5	T–6th (South)	
1997	Pearl River	5–5	2–4	T–5th (South)	
1998	Pearl River	2–8	1–5	7th (South)	
1999	Pearl River	3–7	1–5	6th (South)	
2000	Pearl River	2–3 (Note: Following Daniels' death, Mike Humphreys served as interim head coach for the remaining five games of the season. Pearl River finished the year with an overall record of 4–6.)	0–1		
Pearl River:		21–34	9–22		
Total:		21–34			

=== High school ===
Year	Team	Overall	Conference	Standing	Bowl/playoffs
McCluer Academy Golden Eagles () (1970)
1970	McCluer Academy	7–2–1			
McCluer Academy:		7–2–1			
Copiah Academy Colonels () (1971–1974)
1971	Copiah Academy	5–2–1			
1972	Copiah Academy	3–6			
1973	Copiah Academy	4–6			
1974	Copiah Academy	8–3			
Copiah Academy:		20–17–1			
Total:		27–19–2			
