= Adrian Lee =

Adrian Lee may refer to:

- Adrian Lee (musician), English musician
- Adrian Lee (actor), Australian actor
- Adrian Gordon Lee, member of the Mississippi House of Representatives
- Adrian Lee (character), a character in the TV series The Secret Life of the American Teenager
