= Mississippi Highway 902 =

Highway in Mississippi

Mississippi Highway 902
- MS 902 highlighted in violet

Route information
- Maintained by MDOT
- Length: 4.261 mi (6.857 km)
- Existed: c. 1967–present

Major junctions
- West end: MS 481 near Burns
- East end: MS 35 near Lorena

Location
- Country: United States
- State: Mississippi
- Counties: Smith

Highway system
- Mississippi State Highway System; Interstate; US; State
← MS 897	→ MS 903

Mississippi Highway 902 (MS 902, also known as MS 35 Connector) is a state highway in central Mississippi. The route starts at MS 481 in Burns and it travels northeastwards. It travels within the Bienville National Forest and it ends at MS 35 in Lorena. The road was constructed around 1967 and was paved by 1968. The route was signed as MS 902 on state maps by 1998.

== Route description ==
All of MS 902 is located in Smith County. In 2018, the Mississippi Department of Transportation (MDOT) calculated 210 vehicles traveling on MS 902 north of County Road 32-A (CO 32-A) on average each day. The road is legally defined in Mississippi Code § 65-3-3, as both MS 902 and MS 35 Connector, but it is signed as MS 902. The route is maintained by MDOT as part of the Mississippi State Highway System.

MS 902 starts at a three-way junction with MS 481 in the unincorporated area of Burns and travels northward. As the route is completely within the Bienville National Forest, the majority of the road is surrounded by forests, with several farms located along the way. It then intersects CO 502-A, a gravel spur route of CO 502, and CO 32-A, which travels to MS 35 near Lemon. MS 902 turns northeastwards south of CO 32-B, and continues in that direction until it ends at MS 35 in Lorena. The road continues as CO 32, which ends at CO 541 northwest of Klein.

== History ==
Around 1967, a gravel road from MS 481 to MS 35 was constructed within the Bienville National Forest in Smith County, and it was paved one year later. The road was signed as MS 902 on the state highway map by 1998.

== Major intersections ==
The entire route is in Smith County.

Location	mi	km	Destinations	Notes
Burns	0.000	0.000	MS 481 – Morton, Raleigh	Western terminus
Lorena	4.261	6.857	MS 35 – Forest, Raleigh	Eastern terminus
1.000 mi = 1.609 km; 1.000 km = 0.621 mi
