= Lawrence County High School =

Lawrence County High School can refer to several high schools in the United States:

- Lawrence County High School (Alabama) — Moulton, Alabama
- Lawrence County High School (Kentucky) — Louisa, Kentucky
- Lawrence County High School (Mississippi) — Monticello, Mississippi
- Lawrence County High School (Tennessee) — Lawrenceburg, Tennessee
