= Summerland, Mississippi =

- Unincorporated community
- Location within Mississippi Location within the United States
- Coordinates: 31°47′57″N 89°21′37″W
- Country: United States
- State: Mississippi
- County: Smith
- Elevation: 308 ft (94 m)
- Time zone: UTC-6 (Central (CST))
  - Summer (DST): UTC-5 (CDT)
- Area codes: 601 & 769
- GNIS feature ID: 678399

Summerland is an unincorporated community in Smith County, Mississippi, United States.

Summerland is located on the former Illinois Central Gulf Railroad.

A post office operated under the name Summerland from 1893 to 1955.

In 1900, Summerland had a population of 75 and two general stores. The community also had a bank and school.

The Summerland Oil Field is named for the community.
