= Abigail Heyman =

American photographer (1942–2013)

- Born: Abigail Heyman; August 1, 1942; Danbury, Connecticut, U.S.
- Died: May 28, 2013 (aged 70); New York City, U.S.
- Education: Sarah Lawrence College
- Occupations: Photographer, photojournalist, educator
- Notable work: Growing Up Female (1974)
- Children: Lazar Bloch

Abigail Heyman (August 1, 1942 – May 28, 2013) was an American photographer, photojournalist, and educator. She was a department director and a teacher at the International Center of Photography in Manhattan from the mid-1980s until the 1990s. She published Growing Up Female: A Personal Photo-Journal in 1974.

== Early life and education ==
Heyman was born in Danbury, Connecticut, to real estate developer Lazarus Heyman and Annette Heyman. Abigail was the second of two children. Abigail was the younger sister to her brother, businessman Samuel J. Heyman, who was born March 1, 1939.

She attended Sarah Lawrence College with intentions of becoming a writer, and graduated in 1964.

== Life and work ==
She began the study of photography once she was out of college and attended some photography workshops. Heyman continued to gain knowledge about photography through freelance shooting.

=== Books and exhibitions ===
Her first photography exhibit was in New York 1972 and in 1974 she published the book that won her acclaim, Growing Up Female: A Personal Photo-Journal. For the book, she photographed women in their everyday, limited roles. There are young girls playing with dolls, housewives caring for screaming infants, strippers, and young women waiting to be asked to dance. She called the work "one feminist's point of view" of the narrow range of choices women had in life. In the most controversial and striking images, she photographed herself having an abortion. The book sold over 35,000 copies, which is rare for photograph collections. She soon after published another book, this time focusing on working women: Butcher, Baker, Cabinetmaker (1978). Later on, in 1987, Heyman published another book titled, Dreams and Schemes: Love and Marriage in Modern Times. This book contained black and white photographs with whole extended families of the bride and groom's children from former marriages.

=== The wedding project ===
Along with her other responsibilities related to her company, Heyman took the time to focus on wedding photography as a personal project. This project developed from her work documenting family life and her reflections in deciding to marry a second time. In attending over 200 weddings by the age of 44, Heyman discovered that every wedding has its own story. She sought to find this story, along with the reasoning as to why people get married. Heyman fully immersed herself into her photography sessions at weddings by not only acting like a guest with a camera, but by engaging with the couples through questions. She also photographed weddings because there was something in her own weddings that remained unresolved. Going to other people's weddings with a camera has put her in touch with her personal drama, too.

=== Career ===
Heyman was the first woman to be invited by Charles Harbutt, into the photographer's collective Magnum Photos, where she was active from 1974 and 1981. Heyman was also a photojournalist, her work appearing in Time, Life, Ms., Harpers and The New York Times Magazine.

In the mid-1980s she was director of the documentary and photojournalism department at the International Center of Photography (now International Center of Photography) in Manhattan. In the 1990s, Heyman joined the International Center of Photography in Manhattan as director of the documentary and photojournalism department.

In 1981, Heyman, along with Harbutt, Mark Godfrey, Mary Ellen Mark, and Joan Liftin, co-founded Archive Pictures Inc., an international documentary photographers' cooperative agency in New York City.

During her busy career in the 1980s, Heyman filed a lawsuit on her brother, Samuel, in 1982. She filed for breach of trust as a fiduciary in certain family trusts. However, her brother denied these charges and the claim was dismissed. Though her work is most identified with the Feminist Movement, the specificity and deeply psychological nature of what she captured transcended the movement itself. As Ms. Liftin told The New York Times this June, "As a feminist, she was not so much about marching. She took pictures that showed what the marching was about."

Heyman died on May 28 at the age of 70 due to heart failure. She is survived by her mother, Annette Heyman, of Palm Beach, Florida, and her son, Lazar Bloch, of Brooklyn, New York.

== Personal life ==
Heyman married for the first time at the age of 23, after graduating from college. She then married her second husband in 1978, with whom she had a son named Lazar Bloch.

== Archive and legacy ==
Heyman's photographic work is preserved at Mana Contemporary in Jersey City, New Jersey.

In 2019, Heyman was part of the exhibition, "Eve Arnold, Abigail Heyman, and Susan Meiselas: Untouched Women" held at Arles Les Rencontres de la Photography.

== Bibliography ==
- Growing Up Female: A Personal Photo-Journal. New York, NY: Holt, Rinehart, and Winston, Inc. 1974. ISBN 9780030124518.
- Butcher, Baker, Cabinetmaker (1978)
- Dreams & Schemes: Love and Marriage in Modern Times (1987)
- Editor, with Ethan Hoffman and Alice Rose George, Flesh & Blood: Photographers' Images of Their Own Families (1992)
