= Smith County, Mississippi =

County in Mississippi, United States

- County
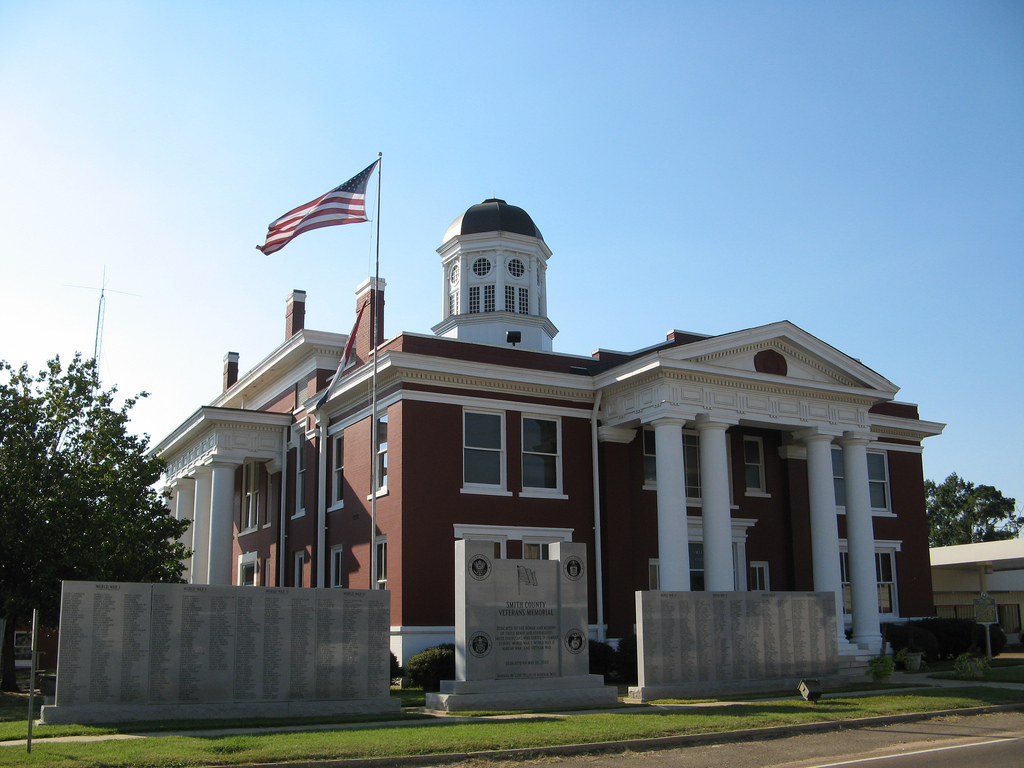
- Smith County Courthouse in Raleigh

- Location within the U.S. state of Mississippi
- Coordinates: 32°01′N 89°30′W
- Country: United States
- State: Mississippi
- Founded: 1833
- Named for: David Smith
- Seat: Raleigh
- Largest town: Taylorsville

Area
  - Total: 637 sq mi (1,650 km^{2})
  - Land: 636 sq mi (1,650 km^{2})
  - Water: 1.0 sq mi (2.6 km^{2}) 0.2%

Population (2020)
  - Total: 14,209
  - Estimate (2025): 13,991 ▼
  - Density: 22.3/sq mi (8.63/km^{2})
- Time zone: UTC−6 (Central)
  - Summer (DST): UTC−5 (CDT)
- Congressional district: 3rd
- Website: www.smithcountyms.gov

Smith County is a county located in the U.S. state of Mississippi. As of the 2020 census, the population was 14,209. Its county seat is Raleigh.

== History ==
Smith County is named for Major David Smith.

== Geography ==
According to the U.S. Census Bureau, the county has a total area of 637 square miles (1,650 km^{2}), of which 636 square miles (1,650 km^{2}) is land and 1.0 square mile (2.6 km^{2}) (0.2%) is water.

=== Major highways ===
- Mississippi Highway 13
- Mississippi Highway 18
- Mississippi Highway 28
- Mississippi Highway 35
- Mississippi Highway 37
- Mississippi Highway 540
- Mississippi Highway 481
- Mississippi Highway 501
- Mississippi Highway 902

=== Adjacent counties ===
- Scott County (north)
- Jasper County (east)
- Jones County (southeast)
- Covington County (south)
- Simpson County (west)
- Rankin County (northwest)

=== National protected area ===
- Bienville National Forest (part)

== Demographics ==
Historical population
Census	Pop.	Note	%±
1840	1,961		—
1850	4,071		107.6%
1860	7,638		87.6%
1870	7,126		−6.7%
1880	8,088		13.5%
1890	10,635		31.5%
1900	13,055		22.8%
1910	16,603		27.2%
1920	16,178		−2.6%
1930	18,405		13.8%
1940	19,403		5.4%
1950	16,740		−13.7%
1960	14,303		−14.6%
1970	13,561		−5.2%
1980	15,077		11.2%
1990	14,798		−1.9%
2000	16,182		9.4%
2010	16,491		1.9%
2020	14,209		−13.8%
2025 (est.)	13,991	▼	−1.5%
U.S. Decennial Census; 1790-1960 1900-1990; 1990-2000 2010-2013

=== Racial and ethnic composition ===
Smith County, Mississippi – Racial and ethnic composition Note: the US Census treats Hispanic/Latino as an ethnic category. This table excludes Latinos from the racial categories and assigns them to a separate category. Hispanics/Latinos may be of any race.
Race / Ethnicity (NH = Non-Hispanic)	Pop 1980	Pop 1990	Pop 2000	Pop 2010	Pop 2020	% 1980	% 1990	% 2000	% 2010	% 2020
White alone (NH)	11,770	11,456	12,268	12,421	10,582	78.07%	77.42%	75.81%	75.32%	74.47%
Black or African American alone (NH)	3,146	3,237	3,728	3,758	3,111	20.87%	21.87%	23.04%	22.79%	21.89%
Native American or Alaska Native alone (NH)	7	16	16	18	20	0.05%	0.11%	0.10%	0.11%	0.14%
Asian alone (NH)	8	7	15	13	19	0.05%	0.05%	0.09%	0.08%	0.13%
Native Hawaiian or Pacific Islander alone (NH)	x	x	1	2	0	x	x	0.01%	0.01%	0.00%
Other race alone (NH)	5	1	6	2	22	0.03%	0.01%	0.04%	0.01%	0.15%
Mixed race or Multiracial (NH)	x	x	52	79	257	x	x	0.32%	0.48%	1.81%
Hispanic or Latino (any race)	141	81	96	198	198	0.94%	0.55%	0.59%	1.20%	1.39%
Total	15,077	14,798	16,182	16,491	14,209	100.00%	100.00%	100.00%	100.00%	100.00%

=== 2020 census ===
As of the 2020 census, the county had a population of 14,209. The median age was 44.1 years. 22.4% of residents were under the age of 18 and 20.4% of residents were 65 years of age or older. For every 100 females there were 93.3 males, and for every 100 females age 18 and over there were 91.1 males age 18 and over.

The racial makeup of the county was 74.7% White, 21.9% Black or African American, 0.1% American Indian and Alaska Native, 0.1% Asian, <0.1% Native Hawaiian and Pacific Islander, 0.8% from some other race, and 2.3% from two or more races. Hispanic or Latino residents of any race comprised 1.4% of the population.

<0.1% of residents lived in urban areas, while 100.0% lived in rural areas.

There were 5,692 households in the county, of which 29.3% had children under the age of 18 living in them. Of all households, 49.9% were married-couple households, 17.9% were households with a male householder and no spouse or partner present, and 28.1% were households with a female householder and no spouse or partner present. About 27.6% of all households were made up of individuals and 12.8% had someone living alone who was 65 years of age or older.

There were 6,622 housing units, of which 14.0% were vacant. Among occupied housing units, 84.9% were owner-occupied and 15.1% were renter-occupied. The homeowner vacancy rate was 1.3% and the rental vacancy rate was 10.1%.

== Communities ==
=== Towns ===
- Mize
- Raleigh (county seat)
- Taylorsville
- Polkville

=== Village ===
- Sylvarena

=== Unincorporated communities ===
- Burns
- Cohay
- Summerland
- Traxler
- White Oak

=== Ghost town ===
- Shongelo

== Politics ==
Smith County is currently a Republican stronghold, although, like most of Mississippi, it was heavily Democratic up until the 1960s. Recently, in 2024 Republican presidential candidate Donald Trump broke 80% of the vote in the county for the first time since 1972.

United States presidential election results for Smith County, Mississippi
Year	Republican		Democratic		Third party(ies)	
Year	No.	%	No.	%	No.	%
1912	12	1.31%	854	93.13%	51	5.56%
1916	30	2.28%	1,271	96.51%	16	1.21%
1920	265	21.10%	968	77.07%	23	1.83%
1924	49	4.22%	1,081	93.11%	31	2.67%
1928	419	22.42%	1,450	77.58%	0	0.00%
1932	17	1.07%	1,576	98.81%	2	0.13%
1936	17	1.00%	1,676	98.94%	1	0.06%
1940	27	1.46%	1,826	98.49%	1	0.05%
1944	165	6.30%	2,456	93.70%	0	0.00%
1948	33	1.48%	295	13.23%	1,901	85.28%
1952	738	24.39%	2,288	75.61%	0	0.00%
1956	277	10.89%	2,055	80.81%	211	8.30%
1960	353	11.98%	1,568	53.22%	1,025	34.79%
1964	4,045	94.44%	238	5.56%	0	0.00%
1968	437	8.48%	352	6.83%	4,367	84.70%
1972	4,419	92.35%	329	6.88%	37	0.77%
1976	3,147	54.75%	2,434	42.35%	167	2.91%
1980	3,772	59.50%	2,474	39.02%	94	1.48%
1984	5,116	76.24%	1,573	23.44%	21	0.31%
1988	4,573	72.76%	1,660	26.41%	52	0.83%
1992	4,106	60.49%	1,968	28.99%	714	10.52%
1996	3,371	58.47%	1,858	32.23%	536	9.30%
2000	4,838	74.11%	1,620	24.82%	70	1.07%
2004	5,577	78.33%	1,496	21.01%	47	0.66%
2008	6,265	75.44%	1,968	23.70%	72	0.87%
2012	6,049	74.69%	1,979	24.44%	71	0.88%
2016	5,928	77.72%	1,617	21.20%	82	1.08%
2020	6,458	77.55%	1,791	21.51%	78	0.94%
2024	6,146	80.07%	1,486	19.36%	44	0.57%

== Education ==
There is one school district in the county, Smith County School District.

The county is in the zone for Jones College.

== See also ==
- Dry counties
- National Register of Historic Places listings in Smith County, Mississippi
