= Thomas Jefferson Young (author) =

American novelist

- Born: October 1, 1921; Oma, Mississippi, U.S.
- Died: March 31, 1995 (aged 73); Winnsboro, Louisiana, U.S.

Thomas Jefferson Young (October 1, 1921 – March 31, 1995), known professionally as Jefferson Young, was an American author known for his 1953 book A Good Man.

== Early life ==
Thomas Jefferson Young was born on October 1, 1921, in the community of Oma, Mississippi, a small hamlet north of the town of Monticello. He was born to Clara Boutwell Young and Thomas Shelby Young. Young graduated from Monticello High School, and enrolled in Hinds Junior College in January 1940, graduating in 1941.

Young then served as a bomber pilot in Europe for the Eighth Air Force during World War II. (Note: It is unclear how many years Young served. The Mississippi Encyclopedia states two years, while his biography page on the condensed version of A Good Man from Reader's Digest gives three years.) He subsequently enrolled at the Missouri School of Journalism at the University of Missouri and graduated in June 1946.

== Career ==
Young spent two years with the American Association of Oilwell Drilling Contractors in Dallas, working in an editorial and public relations position. He submitted a novel in progress to the Eugene F. Saxton Memorial Trust Fellowship, a program for emerging writers to receive funds to complete book projects. He received the grant in 1951 and moved to New Orleans shortly thereafter.

=== A Good Man ===
In 1953, Young's novel, A Good Man, was published. The book was about a Black tenant farmer, Albert Clayton, striving for self-respect and dignity while working on the farm of a white man named John Tittle in Piney Woods, Mississippi. The book was met with praise, including a selection from the Book of the Month service and a condensed version published in Reader's Digest. The New York Times called A Good Man "so good a book that Mr. Young’s future career is certain to be followed eagerly."

He was enrolled at Tulane University for graduate school at the time, though later dropped out after less than a year of study.

== Later life and death ==
Despite the praise, Young did not release another work. In the 1960s, he returned to Oma and lived in the house his parents had built. He died in Winnsboro, Louisiana, on March 31, 1995.
