= John M. Perkins =

American Christian minister, civil rights activist and author (1930–2026)

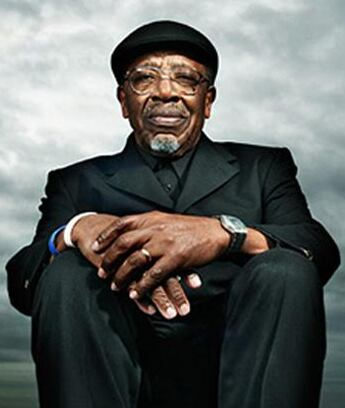
- Born: June 16, 1930; New Hebron, Mississippi, U.S.
- Died: March 13, 2026 (aged 95); Jackson, Mississippi, U.S.
- Resting place: Oak Ridge M.B. Church Cemetery, New Hebron, Mississippi
- Occupations: Minister; civil rights activist; author
- Spouse: Vera Mae Buckley (m. 1951)
- Children: 8

John M. Perkins (June 16, 1930 – March 13, 2026) was an American Christian minister, civil rights activist and author. He was the founder and president of the John & Vera Mae Perkins Foundation with his wife, Vera Mae Perkins. Perkins was also co-founder of the Christian Community Development Association (CCDA).

== Early life ==
John M. Perkins was born on June 16, 1930, in New Hebron, Mississippi. His mother died of pellagra when he was just seven months old. Abandoned by his father, he was raised by his grandmother and extended family, who worked as sharecroppers. He dropped out of school in third grade. In 1947, he moved away from Mississippi at the urging of his family, who worried that he might be in danger following the fatal shooting of his brother, Clyde, by a police officer. He settled in southern California. In June 1951, Perkins married Vera Mae Buckley; earlier that year, he had been drafted into the U.S. Armed Forces. Perkins served in Okinawa during the Korean War. In 1957, Perkins's son, Spencer, invited him to church and Perkins converted to Christianity.

== Career ==
In 1960, Perkins moved with his wife and children from California to Mendenhall, Mississippi, which neighbors his childhood hometown of New Hebron. There, in 1964, he established Voice of Calvary Bible Institute.

In Mendenhall, Vera Mae started running a day-care center from their home that from 1966 to 1968 became part of the federally funded Head Start Program.

In 1965, Perkins supported voter registration efforts in Simpson County, and in 1967 he became involved in school desegregation when he enrolled his son Spencer in the previously all-white Mendenhall High School.

In the fall of 1969, Perkins became the leader in an economic boycott of white-owned stores in Mendenhall. On February 7, 1970, following the arrest of students who had taken part in a protest march in Mendenhall, Perkins was arrested and tortured by white police officers in Brandon Jail.

In 1976, he published a book, A Quiet Revolution: The Christian response to human need, a strategy for today, which outlined his religious philosophy, revolving around the "three Rs": relocation, redistribution and reconciliation.

By the mid-seventies, Voice of Calvary, Jackson and Mendenhall Ministries were operating thrift stores, health clinics, a housing cooperative, and classes in Bible and theology. Perkins was in demand as a speaker in evangelical churches, colleges, and conventions across the country.

In 1981, Perkins handed over executive leadership of Voice of Calvary to Lem Tucker. 1982, the Perkinses returned to California, where Perkins founded Harambee Christian Family Center and the John Perkins Foundation, in Pasadena.

In 1989, Perkins founded the Christian Community Development Association (CCDA), a network of evangelical congregations and organizations working in deprived urban settings. CCDA sought to invite evangelicals into social justice and civil rights.

After the death of his son Spencer in 1998, Perkins established the Spencer Perkins Center, the youth arm of the John M. Perkins Foundation. It has developed youth programs such as After School Tutoring, Summer Arts Camp, Junior and College Internship Program, Good News Bible Club, Young Life and Jubilee Youth Garden. The foundation also has a housing arm, Zechariah 8, providing affordable housing for low-to-moderate-income families, with a focus on single mothers.

On September 17, 2016, Perkins became President Emeritus of the John & Vera Mae Perkins Foundation as his three daughters, Elizabeth, Priscilla, and Deborah Perkins, became co-presidents of the organization.

== Death and memorials ==
Perkins died under hospice care at his home in Jackson, Mississippi, on March 13, 2026, at the age of 95. On March 20, 2026, Perkins would lie in state at Jackson City Hall. Later that day, was transferred to New Horizon Church International in Jackson, where a wake was held. A homegoing service was then held for Perkins at this church on March 21, 2026, with Jackson mayor John Horhn also declaring the day "John M. Perkins Day." Perkins was then buried at Oak Ridge M.B. Church Cemetery in New Hebron, Mississippi, with Hohrn also later confirming that the burial of Perkins in fact took place on March 21, 2026.

== Recognition ==
In 2012, Calvin College began the John M. Perkins Leadership Fellows, a program for students concerned with community injustice.

In 2004, Seattle Pacific University opened the John Perkins Center for Reconciliation, Leadership Training, and Community Development.

In 2009, the band Switchfoot released the song "The Sound (John M. Perkins' Blues)". The song was inspired by Perkins's book Let Justice Roll Down.

== Honorary doctorates ==
- Belhaven University
- Covenant College
- Geneva College
- Gordon College
- Huntington University
- King University
- Millsaps College
- North Park University
- Northern Seminary
- Nyack College
- Seattle Pacific University
- Spring Arbor University
- Taylor University
- Virginia University of Lynchburg
- Wheaton College
- Whitworth University
- Wesley Biblical Seminary
- Jackson State University

== John M. Perkins Fellows & Legacy programs ==
- Calvin University
- Wesley Seminary at Indiana Wesleyan University
- Jackson State University
- Moody Bible Institute
- New Orleans Baptist Theological Seminary
- Northern Seminary of Illinois
- Seattle Pacific University
- University of Virginia, Charlottesville
- Wake Forest School of Divinity

== Awards ==
- 1972 Ford Foundation Fellow
- 1978–1980 Distinguished Black American
- 1980 Mississippi Religious Leadership Man of the Year
- 1980 Who's Who of International Intellectuals
- 1980 John W. Dixon Outstanding Community Service Award
- 1984 Black Business Association of Pasadena/Altadena Humanitarian of the Year
- 1986 NAACP's Ruby McKnight Williams Award
- 1988 American Biographical Institute
- 1988 Personalities of America, 4th ed., Richmond Barthè Historical Society
- 2005 Mighty Men of Valor Lifetime Achievement Award
- 2008 Jordon Lifetime Achievement Award, Evangelical Christian Publishers Association
- 2010 Mississippi Medal of Service Award
- 2016 Beautiful are the Feet Award, Samuel Dewitt Proctor Conference
- 2016 Spirit of Healing Award, Los Angeles Christian Health Centers
- 2017 Game Changer Agent Award, The Forge for Families, Houston, TX
- 2017 For My People Award, Jackson State University
- 2017 The Gospel Coalition Book Awards Finalist
- 2018 Brooks Hays Award, Second Baptist Church, Little Rock, AR
- 2019 Living Legend Award, New Hope Baptist Church, Jackson, MS
- 2019 Chuck Colson Conviction & Courage Award, Biola University
- 2019 Abraham Kuyper Prize, Calvin College
- 2019 Emma Elzy Award, The United Methodist Church, MS
- 2019 John & Vera Mae Perkins Co-Laborer with Christ Award, Indiana Wesley Seminary
- 2020 World Magazine's Daniel of the Year

== Books ==
- Let Justice Roll Down. Regal Books, 1976 ISBN 978-0-8307-4307-0.
- A Quiet Revolution: The Christian Response to Human Need, a Strategy for Today. Word Books, 1976. ISBN 978-0-87680-793-4.
- With Justice for All. Regal Books, 1982 ISBN 978-0-8307-0754-6.
- Beyond Charity: The Call to Christian Community Development. Baker Books, 1993. ISBN 978-0-8010-7122-5.
- He's My Brother: Former Racial Foes Offer Strategy for Reconciliation. Baker Books, 1994. ISBN 978-0-8007-9214-5.
- Resurrecting Hope. Regal, 1995. ISBN 978-0-8307-1810-8.
- Restoring At-Risk Communities: Doing It Together and Doing It Right. Baker Books, 1996 ISBN 978-0-8010-5463-1.
- Linking Arms, Linking Lives: How Urban-Suburban Partnerships Can Transform Communities. Baker Books, 2008. ISBN 978-0-8010-7083-9.
- Follow Me to Freedom: Leading as an Ordinary Radical. Regal Books, 2009. ISBN 978-0-8307-5120-4.
- Welcoming Justice: God's Movement Toward Beloved Community. Intervarsity Press, 2009. ISBN 978-0-8308-3453-2.
- Leadership Revolution: Developing the Vision & Practice of Freedom & Justice. Regal, 2012. ISBN 978-0-8010-1817-6
- Making Neighborhoods Whole: A Handbook for Christian Community Development. Intervarsity Press, 2013 ISBN 978-0-8308-3756-4.
- Dream with Me: Race, Love, and the Struggle We Must Win. Baker Books, 2017. ISBN 978-0-8010-0778-1.
- One Blood: Parting Words to the Church on Race. Moody Publishers, 2018. ISBN 978-0-8024-1801-2.
- He Calls Me Friend: The Healing Power of Friendship in a Lonely World. Moody Publishers, 2019. ISBN 978-0-8024-1936-1.
- Count It All Joy: The Ridiculous Paradox of Suffering. Moody Publishers, 2021. ISBN 978-0-8024-2175-3.
- Go and Do: Nine Axioms on Peacemaking and Transformation From the Life of John Perkins, 2022. ISBN 978-1-7252-9936-8.
