= Westville, Simpson County, Mississippi =

Westville, Mississippi
- Ghost town
- Location within Mississippi Location within the United States
- Coordinates: 31°51′59″N 89°56′29″W
- Country: United States
- State: Mississippi
- County: Simpson
- Elevation: 420 ft (128 m)
- Time zone: UTC-6 (Central (CST))
  - Summer (DST): UTC-5 (CDT)
- GNIS feature ID: 671358

Westville was an unincorporated community in Simpson County, Mississippi, United States, located approximately 1.8 mi (2.9 km) southeast of Pinola. It is now considered a ghost town.

== History ==
The settlement was named for Colonel Cato West. Westville was designated as the county seat in 1824 and served to 1900, when the seat was moved to Mendenhall. In 1905, the seat was briefly returned to Westville, but was returned to Mendenhall the next year. Westville was incorporated in 1836.

The courthouse was built in 1827, but it was destroyed by fire a few years later. It was rebuilt in brick, and burned down again. It was rebuilt a second time, again in brick. After the county seat moved to Mendenhall, Westville declined markedly. It was essentially abandoned later in the century.
