= Lawrence County Courthouse (Mississippi) =

- U.S. National Register of Historic Places
- Mississippi Landmark
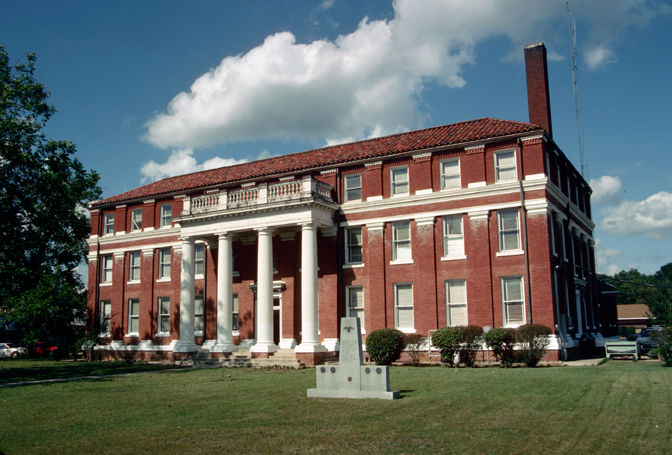
- Lawrence County Mississippi Courthouse in 1993

- Location within Mississippi
- Interactive map showing the location for Lawrence County Courthouse
- Location: Broad Street between Jefferson and Washington Streets, Monticello, Mississippi
- Coordinates: 31°33′15″N 90°6′17″W
- Area: 1.8 acres (0.73 ha)
- Built: 1913
- Architect: Reuben Hunt, et al.
- Architectural style: Classical Revival
- NRHP reference No.: 93000146
- USMS No.: 077-MON-0001-NR-ML

Significant dates
- Added to NRHP: March 4, 1993
- Designated USMS: August 20, 1986

The Lawrence County Courthouse is a government building for Lawrence County, Mississippi, United States, located in the county seat of Monticello. It was built in 1913 and was listed on the National Register of Historic Places on March 4, 1993. It was declared a Mississippi Landmark in 1986.

== See also ==
- List of Mississippi Landmarks
- National Register of Historic Places listings in Lawrence County, Mississippi
