= Rose Bascom =

American trick rider (1922–1993)

- Occupation: Rodeo competitor
- Discipline: Trick riding
- Born: January 25, 1922; Mount Olive, Mississippi, US
- Died: September 23, 1993 (aged 71); St. George, Utah, US

Honors
- National Cowgirl Museum and Hall of Fame

Rose Bascom also known as Texas Rose Bascom (January 25, 1922 – September 23, 1993) is a 1981 National Cowgirl Museum and Hall of Fame trick rider inductee.

== Life ==
Rose Bascom was born Ethel Rose Flynt on January 25, 1922, near Mount Olive, Mississippi, in Covington County, Mississippi. Bascom was of Cherokee-Choctaw Native American descent.

== Career ==
Bascom lived in Arm, Mississippi. She learned fancy trick roping from her brother-in-law, Earl Bascom. After learning to trick ride and rope from Pearl Elder, Rose performed for the first time at the Columbia Rodeo in 1937 becoming known as the "Queen of the Mississippi Cowgirls."

Rose became so adept at trick roping she later toured throughout the world and became known as the "World's Greatest Female Trick Roper". She is the only known female trick roper to master the skill of spinning three ropes at the same time—twirling a rope in each hand and a third one in her mouth (teeth or toes).

In 1937, Rose married Weldon Bascom, a professional rodeo competitor. Soon she became known by the monicker, "World's Greatest Female Trick Roper". The newspaper press dubbed her act "the most beautiful stage performance in the world". She toured with the USO.

In 1938, Rose and her husband moved to Fort Worth, Texas, where he worked for the Fort Worth Stock Yards. In 1939, Rose and Weldon moved to Rock Springs, Wyoming, where Weldon worked in the coal mines.

During her career, Texas Rose Bascom was a professional trick roper, trick rider, and movie actress. She became known as "Queen of the Trick Ropers".

Texas Rose joined the United Service Organizations entertainment troupe to tour around the world. She developed a fluorescent trick rope act which was billed "The Most Beautiful Stage Performance in the World".

Bascom and her husband retired to the Rush Lake Ranch near St. George, Utah. She died at the age of 71 on September 23, 1993.

== Legacy ==
- National Cowgirl Hall of Fame, inducted in 1981
- Utah Cowboy and Western Heritage Museum, inducted in 2013.
- Mississippi Rodeo Hall of Fame, inducted in 2017.
