= Growing Up Female =

1974 book by Abigail Heyman

Growing Up Female: A Personal Photo-Journal
- Author: Abigail Heyman
- Language: English
- Genre: Photography
- Publication date: 1974

Growing Up Female: A Personal Photo-Journal (1974) was a "landmark" book of photography by Abigail Heyman (1942–2013). The book pioneered American feminism in photography by documenting stereotypical women's roles.

== History ==
Heyman introduced the book, writing "this book is about women, and their lives as women, from one feminist’s point of view." The book collected photographs of Heyman's life, "challenge[ing] assumptions about being a woman", and "documented the female experience from a feminist perspective." The black and white images in the book include women doing beauty and domestic tasks such as women as mothers, preparing food, wearing curlers, and grocery shopping. It also contained images of young girls; and demonstrated how female stereotypes were reinforced for girls starting at a young age. According to The New York Times, "[i]n one of the book’s most arresting images, Ms. Heyman photographed herself undergoing an abortion." That image alone, set the tone of the book due to the controversial topic of abortions.

While Growing Up Female: A Personal Photo-Journal is a photo journal, it is safe to assume that there would be no text whatsoever unless the author is giving a brief description of the photos at the beginning of the story (which Heyman did). However, when you look through this photo journal there are four pages that have some form of text. Above the second photo in the journal showcasing a little girl in a bathroom, it says "My aunt use to say, "You're a pretty girl. You'll do well." This pushes the stance on feminism that the photos already had even further. Even from a young age, women were constantly being told or pushed to believe that beauty is everything and is one of the only things what will guaranteed them a good life. This still stems into modern day culture at times due to the overwhelming pressure of beauty standards placed on women today. While it is less demanding due to body positivity and the movements to support individuality, it is still an issue faced by millions.

Around the sixth page of the journal, two contrasting images of women are presented side by side. On the left, a blonde woman is depicted in a cheerleading or marching band uniform, while the adjacent image shows a brunette woman in casual attire holding a football. This juxtaposition highlights the contrast between traditional female stereotypes and more varied expressions of gender roles. Societal pressures surrounding women's appearance and the subversion of conventional gender norms—particularly regarding participation in male-dominated sports—have remained persistent themes across multiple decades.

Andy Grundberg described the book as "test[ing] the line between reportage and personal expression."

During the 1970s, the work sold more than 35,000 copies, and was a mainstay of women's bookstores and feminist literature displays, along with Our Bodies, Ourselves.
