= Clint Rotenberry =

American politician

Clinton Grice Rotenberry Jr.

Member of the Mississippi House of Representatives
- In office 1992–2007

Personal details
- Born: January 12, 1953 Mendenhall, Mississippi, U.S.
- Party: Republican
- Education: Belhaven University
- Occupation: Politician, Businessman

Clinton Grice Rotenberry Jr. (born January 12, 1953) is a former American politician and businessman.

Born in Mendenhall, Mississippi, Rotenberry went to Belhaven University and is the owner of Rotenberry Realty in Mendenhall, Mississippi. Rotenberry served in the Mississippi House of Representatives from 1992–2007. Rotenberg was a Republican.
