= Columbia and Silver Creek Railroad =

Overview
- Headquarters: Columbia, Mississippi
- Reporting mark: CLSL
- Locale: Mississippi
- Dates of operation: 1982–1992
- Predecessor: Illinois Central
- Successor: Gloster Southern

Technical
- Track gauge: 4 ft 8 1/2 in (1,435 mm) (standard gauge)
- Length: 28.7 miles (46.2 km)

The Columbia and Silver Creek Railroad (reporting mark CLSL) was a shortline railroad formerly operating between a connection with the Illinois Central at Silver Creek to Columbia, 28.7 miles (46.2 km). Later the railroad shifted location from the Columbia line to a branch from Taylorsville to Soso, Mississippi, and was owned by Richard Abernathy. Currently the original line exists as part of the Gloster Southern Railroad, while the newer segment was abandoned.

== History ==
Originally built by the Gulf and Ship Island Railroad between Columbia and Silver Creek around 1905, the railroad was later acquired by the Illinois Central.

The Illinois Central sold the Columbia - Silver Creek line to the Marion County Railroad Authority in March 1982. Traffic consisted of paper, forest products, chemicals, furniture. Service began shortly thereafter, and the line was sold November 1, 1988 to the Gloster Southern. However, operations ended on the line in December 1995.

A second segment ran from an Illinois Central connection at Taylorsville and ended at Soso, for a distance of 10.5 miles (6.1 km). This section was owned by Richard Abernathy, but ceased operations in 1992.
