= Merry Hell, Mississippi =

- Unincorporated community
- Location within Mississippi Location within the United States
- Coordinates: 31°48′23″N 89°39′45″W
- Country: United States
- State: Mississippi
- County: Simpson
- Elevation: 413 ft (126 m)
- Time zone: UTC-6 (Central (CST))
  - Summer (DST): UTC-5 (CDT)
- Area codes: 601 & 769
- GNIS feature ID: 707312

Merry Hell is an unincorporated community in Simpson County, Mississippi, in the United States.

== History ==
Merry Hell was so named from the family feuds of the early Scottish settlers.
