= Martinas Rankin =

American football player (born 1994)

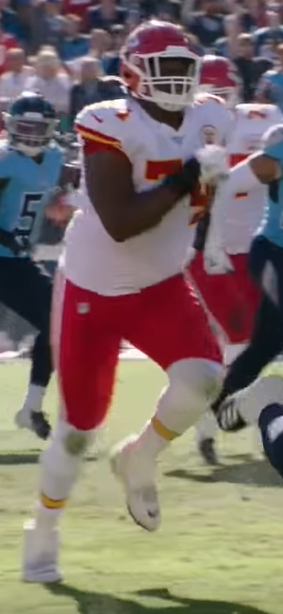
- Rankin with the Kansas City Chiefs in 2019

No. 74, 75, 77
- Position: Offensive tackle

Personal information
- Born: October 20, 1994 (age 32); Jackson, Mississippi, U.S.
- Listed height: 6 ft 5 in (1.96 m)
- Listed weight: 311 lb (141 kg)

Career information
- High school: Mendenhall (Mendenhall, Mississippi)
- College: Mississippi State
- NFL draft: 2018: 3rd round, 80th overall pick

Career history
- Houston Texans (2018); Kansas City Chiefs (2019–2020)

Awards and highlights
- Super Bowl champion (LIV); Kent Hull Trophy (2017); First-team All-SEC (2017)

Career NFL statistics
- Games played: 23
- Games started: 10
- Stats at Pro Football Reference

Martinas Orlando Rankin (born October 20, 1994) is an American former professional football player who was an offensive tackle in the National Football League (NFL). He played college football for the Mississippi State Bulldogs and was selected by the Houston Texans in the third round of the 2018 NFL draft. He was also a member of the Kansas City Chiefs.

== Early life ==
After playing at Mendenhall High School in Mendenhall, Mississippi, Rankin spent two years at Mississippi Gulf Coast Community College in Perkinston, Mississippi. He was rated as the ninth best junior college recruit by 247Sports and committed to play at Mississippi State over offers from Oklahoma, Florida, Louisville, Missouri, Ohio State, Ole Miss, Texas, and others.

== College career ==
Rankin redshirted in 2015 and earned a starting job as a junior in 2016. He had a breakout year in 2017, winning the Kent Hull Trophy and being named to the 2017 All-SEC football team.

== Professional career ==
=== Pre-draft ===
Before his senior season, Rankin was projected as a first round pick in the 2018 NFL draft by several writers. Rankin's draft stock began to slide after he sustained an ankle injury during the season and also had mediocre performances against LSU and Auburn. On November 16, 2017, it was announced that Rankin had accepted his invitation to play in the 2018 Senior Bowl. On January 20, 2018, it was reported that Rankin would be unable to play in the Senior Bowl due to an ankle injury he sustained in the TaxSlayer Bowl. Rankin attended the NFL Scouting Combine in Indianapolis, but did not perform any drills due to the foot injury he sustained. On March 28, 2018, he attended Mississippi State's pro day, but chose to only perform the broad jump and vertical jump. Rankin also attended a private meetings with representatives from the Cincinnati Bengals and Denver Broncos. At the conclusion of the pre-draft process, Rankin was projected to be a second or third round pick by NFL draft experts and scouts. He was ranked as the fourth best offensive tackle by Scouts Inc. and was ranked the seventh best offensive tackle in the draft by DraftScout.com and Sports Illustrated.

Pre-draft measurables
Height	Weight	Arm length	Hand span	Vertical jump	Broad jump
6 ft 4 3/8 in (1.94 m)	308 lb (140 kg)	33 3/4 in (0.86 m)	10 1/8 in (0.26 m)	29 in (0.74 m)	9 ft 0 in (2.74 m)
All values from NFL Combine /Mississippi State's Pro Day

=== Houston Texans ===
The Houston Texas selected Rankin in the third round with the 80th overall pick in the 2018 NFL draft. Rankins was the eighth offensive tackle drafted in 2018. The pick used to draft Rankin was acquired in a trade that sent Duane Brown to the Seattle Seahawks. On May 10, 2018, the Texans signed Rankin to a four-year, $3.54 million contract that includes a signing bonus of $901,268.

External videos
- Texans draft Martinas Rankin 80th overall
- NFL Draft Profile: Martinas Rankin

The Texans stated they drafted Rankin to play offensive tackle although many scouts and draft experts viewed him as an interior offensive lineman in the NFL. During rookie minicamp, Rankin sustained a foot injury which required surgery and was sidelined for the entire training camp.

=== Kansas City Chiefs ===
On August 31, 2019, Rankin was traded to the Kansas City Chiefs in exchange for running back Carlos Hyde. He started five games at left guard before suffering a knee injury in Week 10. He was placed on injured reserve on November 11. During his absence, the Chiefs went on to win Super Bowl LIV over the San Francisco 49ers, their first championship in 50 years.

Rankin was placed on the active/physically unable to perform list (PUP) at the start of training camp on July 31, 2020. He was moved to the reserve/PUP list at the start of the regular season on September 5. Rankin was activated on November 10. He was placed on the reserve/COVID-19 list by the Chiefs on November 16, and activated on November 23.

Rankin was waived by Kansas City on June 17, 2021.
