= Johnson-White House =

Historic house in Mississippi, United States

- U.S. National Register of Historic Places
- Location within Mississippi Location within the United States
- Nearest city: Sontag, Mississippi
- Coordinates: 31°38′52″N 90°11′6″W
- Area: 4.9 acres (2.0 ha)
- Built: 1820
- Built by: Andrew Johnson, Sr.
- Architectural style: Dog trot
- MPS: Lawrence County Folk and Vernacular TR
- NRHP reference No.: 80002276
- Added to NRHP: September 29, 1980

The Johnson-White House near Sontag, Mississippi was built c. 1820 by settler Andrew Johnson, Sr. It is the oldest dog trot style house in the county.

By 1980 the breezeway had been closed off to make an additional room in the house, and a gable had been added overhead. The property also included two log buildings: a smokehouse with half-notched corners and another outbuilding with saddle-notched corners.

It was listed on the National Register in 1980.
