= Adrian Gordon Lee =

American politician

Member of the Mississippi House of Representatives
- In office 1964–1968

Personal details
- Born: August 3, 1929 Pinola, Mississippi, U.S.
- Died: June 6, 2004 (aged 74) Ocean Springs, Mississippi, U.S.
- Party: Independent
- Spouse: Joan Alsup
- Education: Louisiana Tech University

Adrian Gordon Lee (August 3, 1929 – June 6, 2004) was an American politician. He served as an Independent member of the Mississippi House of Representatives.

== Life and career ==
Lee was born in Pinola, Mississippi. He attended Lake Providence High School, Northeast College and Louisiana Tech University.

In 1964, Lee was elected to the Mississippi House of Representatives, serving until 1968.

Lee died on June 6, 2004 in Ocean Springs, Mississippi, at the age of 74.
