= Traxler, Mississippi =

- Unincorporated community
- Location within Mississippi Location within the United States
- Coordinates: 32°00′36″N 89°38′58″W
- Country: United States
- State: Mississippi
- County: Smith
- Elevation: 568 ft (173 m)
- Time zone: UTC-6 (Central (CST))
  - Summer (DST): UTC-5 (CDT)
- Area codes: 601 & 769
- GNIS feature ID: 672867

Traxler is an unincorporated community in Smith County, Mississippi, United States.

A post office operated under the name Traxler from 1900 to 1937.

The Traxler Oil Field is named for the community.
