= Arm, Mississippi =

- Unincorporated community
- Location within Mississippi Location within the United States
- Coordinates: 31°30′11″N 90°00′58″W
- Country: United States
- State: Mississippi
- County: Lawrence
- Elevation: 243 ft (74 m)
- Time zone: UTC-6 (Central (CST))
  - Summer (DST): UTC-5 (CDT)
- Area codes: 601 & 769
- GNIS feature ID: 666367

Arm is an unincorporated community in Lawrence County, Mississippi, United States. Arm is located on Mississippi Highway 43 6.4 miles (10.3 km) east-southeast of Monticello, and 2.3 miles (3.7 km) south of the junction with Mississippi Highway 43A.

== History ==
When the Gulf and Ship Island Railroad was built through the area in 1905, the town of Arm was founded and named for W.J Armstrong who owned land near the railroad. A sawmill was built and a village developed, flourishing for a while until the mill was removed. In 1910, Arm had two sawmills, five general stores, and physician. By 1919, the community supported four sawmills. Since then, Arm became a farming center with one church and a store with a post office.

== Notable people ==
- Earl W. Bascom, rodeo champion
- Texas Rose Bascom, rodeo trick rider
