= Lisa Kereszi =

American photographer and professor

- Born: 1973; Chester, Pennsylvania, USA
- Known for: Photography
- Website: www.lisakereszi.com

Lisa Kereszi (born 1973) is an American photographer and professor from Pennsylvania.

== Life and work ==
Kereszi grew up in Pennsylvania where her father owned a junkyard in Trainer and her mother owned and ran an antique store. Kereszi earned a BA from Bard College working with Stephen Shore and others. After graduating from Bard, she began working as an assistant to Nan Goldin. After NYC, she attended Yale University in 2000 to earn an MFA. She has been associated with the university since 2004 as a faculty member.

Her work uses color photography and deals with both fantasy and the idea of home. In the realm of fantasy or "places around the cultural fringe", her projects have included haunted houses both operating and during daylight hours, burlesque dancers, and strip clubs. For work about home, she photographed her grandfather's junkyard, culminating in a book published in 2012 about which The New York Times remarked the junkyard was "a perfect place for an artist to be born."

She has done commissions for Yale University, T: The New York Times Style Magazine, and Orion. Her commercial clients include Nike, IBM, and Capitol Records.

== Publications ==
- Governors Island: Photographs by Lisa Kereszi & Andrew Moore. New York City: Public Art Fund, 2005. ISBN 0960848835.
- Fun and Games. Nazraeli Press, 2009. ISBN 1590052579.
- Joe's Junk Yard. Damiani, 2012. ISBN 8862082304.
- Lisa Kereszi: The More I Learn About Women. J&L Books, 2014. ISBN 0989531112.

== Collections ==
Kereszi's work is held in the following permanent public collections:

- Whitney Museum of American Art, New York City
- Ogden Museum of Southern Art, New Orleans, LA
- Yale University Art Gallery, New Haven, CT
- Brooklyn Museum, Brooklyn, New York City
