= Koch, Mississippi =

- Unincorporated community
- Location within Mississippi Location within the United States
- Coordinates: 32°29′45″N 89°53′11″W
- Country: United States
- State: Mississippi
- County: Rankin
- Elevation: 341 ft (104 m)
- Time zone: UTC-6 (Central (CST))
  - Summer (DST): UTC-5 (CDT)
- Area codes: 601 & 769
- GNIS feature ID: 691990

Koch is an unincorporated community in Rankin County, Mississippi, United States. Koch is located on the former Gulf, Mobile and Ohio Railroad.
