= Bahala Creek =

Stream in Mississippi, U.S.

Bahala Creek Big Bahala Creek, Mulberry Creek
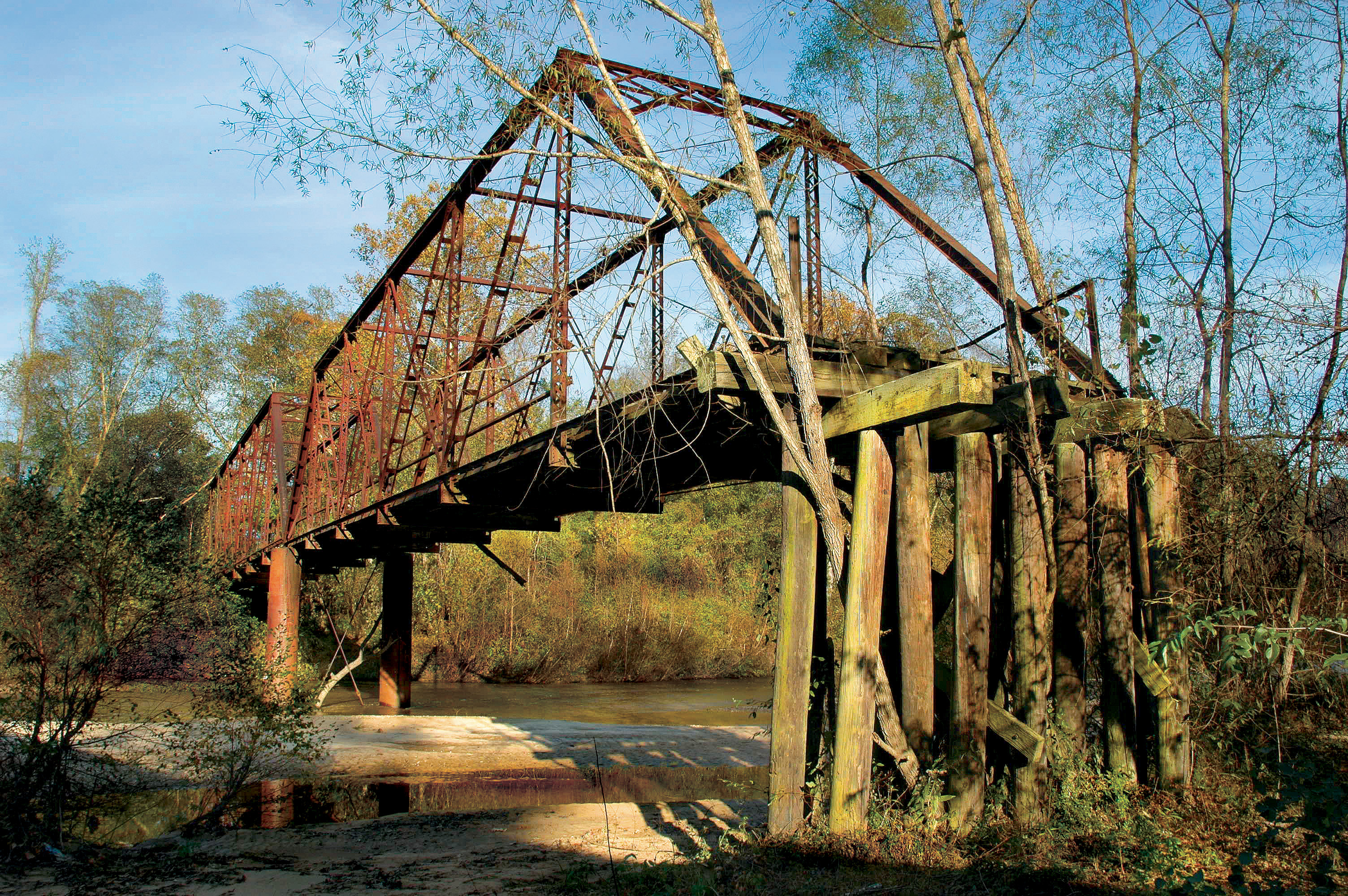
- The Bahala Creek Bridge over the creek in Oma

- Location of the mouth in Mississippi
- Etymology: Likely from Choctaw "bihi," meaning mulberry, and "hieli," meaning "standing"

Location
- Country: United States
- State: Mississippi
- Counties: Lincoln, Copiah, Lawrence

Physical characteristics
- Source
  - location: Hazlehurst, Mississippi
  - coordinates: 31°52′27.58″N 90°22′47.33″W
  - elevation: 453 ft (138 m)
- Mouth: Pearl River
  - location: near Monticello, Mississippi
  - coordinates: 31°41′14.60″N 90°06′49.31″W
  - elevation: 190 ft (58 m)

Bahala Creek is a stream in the U.S. state of Mississippi. It is a tributary of the Pearl River.

== Etymology ==
"Bahala" (Note: Alternatively spelled "Behala" or "Bihala" on some early maps) (pronounced buh-HAY-la or buh-HAL-uh) is most likely derived from the Choctaw language, where "bihi" is defined as mulberry trees and "hieli" is defined as "standing." This is corroborated by an 1818 map, which referred to the creek as "Mulberry Creek." A variant name is "Big Bahala Creek."
