= Sontag, Mississippi =

- Unincorporated community
- Location within Mississippi Location within the United States
- Coordinates: 31°39′09″N 90°12′15″W
- Country: United States
- State: Mississippi
- County: Lawrence
- Elevation: 259 ft (79 m)
- Time zone: UTC-6 (Central (CST))
  - Summer (DST): UTC-5 (CDT)
- ZIP code: 39665
- Area codes: 601 & 769
- GNIS feature ID: 677977

Sontag is an unincorporated community in northwest Lawrence County, Mississippi. It is the nearest community to Johnson-White House, a house listed on the U.S. National Register of Historic Places that was designed by architect Andrew Johnson. The community is located near the former Mississippi Central Railroad (later purchased by the Illinois Central Railroad and the line was purchased by current owner, the Canadian National Railway). In 1900, the population was 25.
