= Lawrence County High School (Mississippi) =

Location
- 713 West Thomas E. Jolly Drive; Monticello, Mississippi 39654; United States; 31.5457°N 90.1161°W

Information
- Motto: Achievement. Advancement. Accountability
- Principal: Tawanna Thornton
- Staff: 37.83 (on an FTE basis)
- Grades: 9–12
- Gender: Coeducational
- Enrollment: 564 (2023–2024)
- Student to teacher ratio: 14.91
- Colors: Cardinal, black and white
- Mascot: Cougars
- Website: lchs.lawcosd.org

Lawrence County High School is a public high school located in Monticello, Mississippi, United States.

== General information ==
- Lawrence County High School is part of the Lawrence County School District and serves students in grades 9-12.
- Located in Monticello, Mississippi, Lawrence County High School serves approximately 650 students.
- According to the Mississippi Department of Education's 2010 Accountability Results, Lawrence County High School has an 80.5% graduation rate.
- Lawrence County High School is under the direction of principal Tawanna Thorton.

== Athletics ==
Lawrence County High School's Athletic Director and Head Coach of the LCHS Cougar Football team is Mike Davis. The Lawrence County High School mascot is the Cougar.

LCHS Athletics
	Male Athletics	Female Athletics
Football	Varsity
Basketball	Varsity & Jr. Varsity	Varsity
Baseball	Varsity
Softball		Varsity
Soccer	Varsity	Varsity

- Leading the Cougar Boys' Basketball team to two state championships, Miami Heat's Erick Dampier is a graduate of Lawrence County High School.
- In 2008, Patrick Sutton, then a student at Lawrence County High School, won the silver medal in the International Powerlifting Federation's Men's Sub-Junior category in Potchefstroom, South Africa.

== Notable alumni ==
- Ahmad Hardy, college football running back for the Louisiana–Monroe Warhawks
- Addie Carver, beauty pageant titleholder and former Miss Teen USA 2024
