= Rockport, Mississippi =

- Unincorporated community
- Location within Mississippi Location within the United States
- Coordinates: 31°47′42″N 90°09′23″W
- Country: United States
- State: Mississippi
- County: Copiah
- Elevation: 270 ft (82 m)
- Time zone: UTC-6 (Central (CST))
  - Summer (DST): UTC-5 (CDT)
- GNIS feature ID: 676770

Rockport is an unincorporated community in Copiah County, Mississippi.

Located a short distance west of the Pearl River, Rockport was once a thriving railway town, though little remains of the original settlement.

== History ==
Indigenous people first occupied the area. Archeological remnants located near Rockport include pottery, copper beads, a sharpened point of a stake, skeletons, and mounds.

The Galilee Baptist Church established west of the settlement in 1825, and is still located there.

Rockport established in 1849.

From 1856 to 1956, Rockport had a post Office.

A company of the Confederate States Army was organized in Rockport in July 1861. Known as the "Rockport Steel Blades", they were part of the 6th Mississippi Infantry Regiment.

In 1870, a bill was introduced in the Mississippi State Senate to establish a ferry across the Pearl River at Rockport.

The early settlement had a drug store, barber shop, stores, Masonic lodge, and hotel called the Rockport Hotel.

The New Orleans, Jackson and Great Northern Railroad was built through the settlement in 1909, and Rockport was a flag stop. Trains like The Rebel once passed through Rockport. The line is now abandoned.

By 1937, Rockport contained only a small store, gas station, post office and church.

== Climate ==
Climate data for Rockprt, Mississippi (1981-2010 normals)
Month	Jan	Feb	Mar	Apr	May	Jun	Jul	Aug	Sep	Oct	Nov	Dec	Year
Average precipitation inches (mm)	5.36 (136)	6.23 (158)	5.17 (131)	4.97 (126)	4.75 (121)	4.39 (112)	4.51 (115)	4.44 (113)	3.52 (89)	4.17 (106)	4.67 (119)	5.72 (145)	57.9 (1,471)
Average snowfall inches (cm)	0.0 (0.0)	0.0 (0.0)	0.1 (0.25)	0.0 (0.0)	0.0 (0.0)	0.0 (0.0)	0.0 (0.0)	0.0 (0.0)	0.0 (0.0)	0.0 (0.0)	0.0 (0.0)	0.0 (0.0)	0.1 (0.25)
Average precipitation days (≥ 0.01 in)	8.7	8.5	7.8	6.4	7.9	8.8	9.2	7.9	5.6	5.9	7.0	8.8	92.5
Average snowy days (≥ 0.01 in)	0	0	0.1	0	0	0	0	0	0	0	0	0	0.1
Source: NOAA
