= Monticello High School (Mississippi) =

School in Monticello, Mississippi

Monticello High School was a public high school in Monticello, Lawrence County, Mississippi.

It was apparently closed down after the 1986 football season. The school mascot was the Red Devil; the school colors maroon and white.

The School Room of the Lawrence County Regional Historical Museum houses yearbooks and trophies from this school.

== Notable alumni ==
- Mark Green, Republican Representative of Tennessee's 7th congressional district.
- Thomas Jefferson Young, author
