= Burns, Mississippi =

- Unincorporated community
- Location within Mississippi Location within the United States
- Coordinates: 32°08′08″N 89°32′52″W
- Country: United States
- State: Mississippi
- County: Smith
- Elevation: 410 ft (120 m)
- Time zone: UTC-6 (Central (CST))
  - Summer (DST): UTC-5 (CDT)
- Area codes: 601 & 769
- GNIS feature ID: 692775

Burns is an unincorporated community in Smith County, Mississippi, United States.

A post office operated under the name Burns from 1882 to 1974.

In 1900, Burns had a population of 62.

Burns is served by the Burns Baptist Church and the Burns Community Church (a member of the Association of Independent Methodists).
