= Lawrence County School District (Mississippi) =

School district in Mississippi

The Lawrence County School District is a public school district based in Monticello, Mississippi (USA). The district's boundaries parallel that of Lawrence County. The Lawrence County School District is under the administration of Tammy Fairburn.

There were a total of 2,322 students enrolled in the Lawrence County School District during the 2006–07 school year.

== Schools ==
- Lawrence County High School (Grades 9-12)
  - Tawanna C. Thornton, Principal
- Lawrence County IMPACT Center (Grades 5-12)
  - Carla Bell, Director
- Lawrence County Technology & Career Center (Grades 9-12)
  - Darrel Turner, Director
- Rod Paige Middle School (Grades 5-8)
  - Lenard King, Principal
- Monticello Elementary School (Grades K-4)
  - Cynthia Carr Williamson, Principal
- New Hebron Attendance Center (Grades K-8)
  - Ronnie Morgan, Principal
- Topeka Tilton Attendance Center (Grades K-8)
  - John Bull, Principal

== Demographics ==
=== 2006–07 school year ===
There were a total of 2,322 students enrolled in the Lawrence County School District during the 2006–07 school year. The gender makeup of the district was 49% female and 51% male. The racial makeup of the district was 42.33% African American, 56.20% White, 0.95% Hispanic, and 0.52% Asian. 55.7% of the district's students were eligible to receive free lunch.

=== Previous school years ===
| School Year | Enrollment | Gender Makeup | | Racial Makeup | | | | |
| School Year | Enrollment | Female | Male | Asian | African American | Hispanic | Native American | White |
|---|---|---|---|---|---|---|---|---|
| 2005–06 | 2,396 | 50% | 50% | 0.38% | 42.40% | 0.67% | 0.17% | 56.39% |
| 2004–05 | 2,346 | 50% | 50% | 0.30% | 39.64% | 0.60% | – | 59.46% |
| 2003–04 | 2,400 | 50% | 50% | 0.29% | 40.96% | 0.50% | – | 58.25% |
| 2002–03 | 2,391 | 50% | 50% | 0.21% | 40.19% | 0.54% | – | 59.05% |

== Accountability statistics ==
| | 2006–07 | 2005–06 | 2004–05 | 2003–04 | 2002–03 |
|---|---|---|---|---|---|
| District Accreditation Status | Accredited | Accredited | Accredited | Accredited | Accredited |
School Performance Classifications
| Level 5 (Superior Performing) Schools | 2 | 1 | 1 | 0 | 0 |
| Level 4 (Exemplary) Schools | 1 | 3 | 3 | 4 | 4 |
| Level 3 (Successful) Schools | 2 | 1 | 1 | 1 | 1 |
| Level 2 (Under Performing) Schools | 0 | 0 | 0 | 0 | 0 |
| Level 1 (Low Performing) Schools | 0 | 0 | 0 | 0 | 0 |
| Not Assigned | 0 | 0 | 0 | 0 | 0 |

== See also ==
- List of school districts in Mississippi
