= Pinola, Mississippi =

- Unincorporated community
- Location within Mississippi Location within the United States
- Coordinates: 31°52′38″N 89°57′43″W
- Country: United States
- State: Mississippi
- County: Simpson
- Elevation: 312 ft (95 m)
- Time zone: UTC-6 (Central (CST))
  - Summer (DST): UTC-5 (CDT)
- ZIP code: 39149
- Area codes: 601 & 769
- GNIS feature ID: 675921

Pinola is an unincorporated community in Simpson County, Mississippi, United States. Its zip code is 39149.

== History ==
Pinola is named for the surrounding pine forests. Many of the building in Pinola was constructed from buildings that were moved from nearby Westville. The town was partially destroyed by a fire in 1912.

Pinola is located on the former Illinois Central Railroad and was incorporated on November 9, 1903.

In 1906, Pinola had a population of 300, two sawmills, a cotton gin, several stores, a school, and a bank, The Pinola Bank.

== Education ==
Simpson Central School, a kindergarten-8th grade school that is part of the Simpson County School District, is located in Pinola.

== Notable people ==
- Adrian Gordon Lee, member of the Mississippi House of Representatives from 1964 to 1968
