= Simpson County, Mississippi =

County in Mississippi, United States

- County
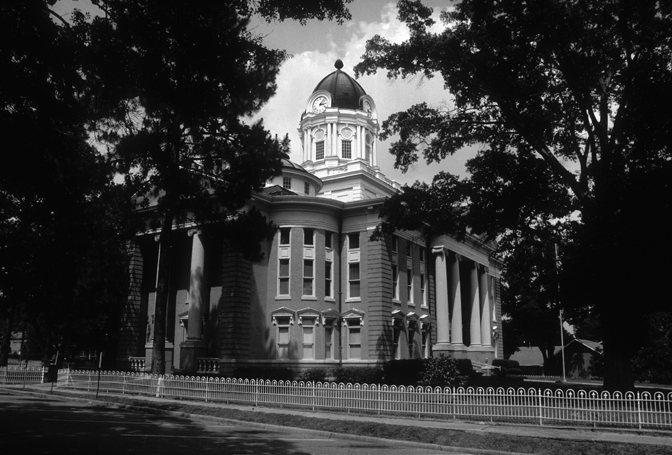
- Simpson County Courthouse in Mendenhall

- Location within the U.S. state of Mississippi
- Coordinates: 31°55′N 89°55′W
- Country: United States
- State: Mississippi
- Founded: 1824
- Named for: Josiah Simpson
- Seat: Mendenhall
- Largest city: Magee

Area
  - Total: 590 sq mi (1,500 km^{2})
  - Land: 589 sq mi (1,530 km^{2})
  - Water: 1.3 sq mi (3.4 km^{2}) 0.2%

Population (2020)
  - Total: 25,949
  - Estimate (2025): 25,498 ▼
  - Density: 44.1/sq mi (17.0/km^{2})
- Time zone: UTC−6 (Central)
  - Summer (DST): UTC−5 (CDT)
- Congressional district: 3rd
- Website: simpsoncountyms.com

Simpson County is a county located in the U.S. state of Mississippi. Its western border is formed by the Pearl River, an important transportation route in the 19th century. As of the 2020 census, the population was 25,949. The county seat is Mendenhall. The county is named for Josiah Simpson (1787–1817), a territorial judge who also served as a delegate to Mississippi's Constitutional Convention. Simpson County is part of the Jackson, Mississippi metropolitan area.

== Geography ==
According to the U.S. Census Bureau, the county has a total area of 590 square miles (1,500 km^{2}), of which 589 square miles (1,530 km^{2}) is land and 1.3 square miles (3.4 km^{2}) (0.2%) is water.

=== Major highways ===
- U.S. Highway 49
- Mississippi Highway 13
- Mississippi Highway 28
- Mississippi Highway 43
- Mississippi Highway 149

=== Adjacent counties ===
- Rankin County (north)
- Smith County (east)
- Covington County (southeast)
- Jefferson Davis County (south)
- Lawrence County (southwest)
- Copiah County (west)

== Demographics ==
Historical population
Census	Pop.	Note	%±
1830	2,680		—
1840	3,380		26.1%
1850	4,734		40.1%
1860	6,080		28.4%
1870	5,718		−6.0%
1880	8,008		40.0%
1890	10,138		26.6%
1900	12,800		26.3%
1910	17,201		34.4%
1920	18,109		5.3%
1930	20,897		15.4%
1940	22,024		5.4%
1950	21,819		−0.9%
1960	20,454		−6.3%
1970	19,947		−2.5%
1980	23,441		17.5%
1990	23,953		2.2%
2000	27,639		15.4%
2010	27,503		−0.5%
2020	25,949		−5.7%
2025 (est.)	25,498	▼	−1.7%
U.S. Decennial Census; 1790-1960 1900-1990; 1990-2000 2010-2013

=== Racial and ethnic composition ===
Simpson County, Mississippi – Racial and ethnic composition Note: the US Census treats Hispanic/Latino as an ethnic category. This table excludes Latinos from the racial categories and assigns them to a separate category. Hispanics/Latinos may be of any race.
Race / Ethnicity (NH = Non-Hispanic)	Pop 1980	Pop 1990	Pop 2000	Pop 2010	Pop 2020	% 1980	% 1990	% 2000	% 2010	% 2020
White alone (NH)	16,100	16,086	17,686	17,131	15,928	68.68%	67.16%	63.99%	62.29%	61.38%
Black or African American alone (NH)	7,135	7,732	9,432	9,624	8,803	30.44%	32.28%	34.13%	34.99%	33.92%
Native American or Alaska Native alone (NH)	15	46	32	35	36	0.06%	0.19%	0.12%	0.13%	0.14%
Asian alone (NH)	9	22	35	78	84	0.04%	0.09%	0.13%	0.28%	0.32%
Native Hawaiian or Pacific Islander alone (NH)	x	x	3	34	2	x	x	0.01%	0.12%	0.01%
Other race alone (NH)	1	0	6	16	62	0.00%	0.00%	0.02%	0.06%	0.24%
Mixed race or Multiracial (NH)	x	x	127	198	648	x	x	0.46%	0.72%	2.50%
Hispanic or Latino (any race)	181	67	318	387	386	0.77%	0.28%	1.15%	1.41%	1.49%
Total	23,441	23,953	27,639	27,503	25,949	100.00%	100.00%	100.00%	100.00%	100.00%

=== 2020 census ===
As of the 2020 census, the county had a population of 25,949. The median age was 40.4 years. 24.0% of residents were under the age of 18 and 18.1% of residents were 65 years of age or older. For every 100 females there were 94.9 males, and for every 100 females age 18 and over there were 90.6 males age 18 and over.

The racial makeup of the county was 61.6% White, 34.1% Black or African American, 0.2% American Indian and Alaska Native, 0.3% Asian, <0.1% Native Hawaiian and Pacific Islander, 0.9% from some other race, and 2.9% from two or more races. Hispanic or Latino residents of any race comprised 1.5% of the population.

<0.1% of residents lived in urban areas, while 100.0% lived in rural areas.

There were 10,014 households in the county, of which 31.9% had children under the age of 18 living in them. Of all households, 45.1% were married-couple households, 18.8% were households with a male householder and no spouse or partner present, and 30.6% were households with a female householder and no spouse or partner present. About 27.1% of all households were made up of individuals and 12.3% had someone living alone who was 65 years of age or older.

There were 11,559 housing units, of which 13.4% were vacant. Among occupied housing units, 75.8% were owner-occupied and 24.2% were renter-occupied. The homeowner vacancy rate was 1.2% and the rental vacancy rate was 10.1%.

== Communities ==
=== Cities ===
- Magee
- Mendenhall

=== Town ===
- D'Lo

=== Village ===
- Braxton

=== Unincorporated communities ===
- Harrisville
- Merry Hell
- Pinola
- Sanatorium
- Saratoga

=== Ghost town ===
- Westville

== Politics ==
Simpson county used to be democratic in the Solid South era, but it has since become more republican. It has not supported a Democratic presidential candidate since 1956, nor any third-party candidates since 1968.^{[citation needed.]}

United States presidential election results for Simpson County, Mississippi
Year	Republican		Democratic		Third party(ies)	
Year	No.	%	No.	%	No.	%
1912	19	2.79%	606	88.86%	57	8.36%
1916	34	3.38%	966	96.02%	6	0.60%
1920	109	10.63%	902	88.00%	14	1.37%
1924	100	6.15%	1,518	93.42%	7	0.43%
1928	231	10.88%	1,893	89.12%	0	0.00%
1932	47	2.36%	1,941	97.59%	1	0.05%
1936	48	1.92%	2,445	98.04%	1	0.04%
1940	40	1.70%	2,316	98.26%	1	0.04%
1944	78	3.06%	2,470	96.94%	0	0.00%
1948	59	2.29%	171	6.65%	2,342	91.06%
1952	878	24.09%	2,767	75.91%	0	0.00%
1956	467	14.64%	2,140	67.11%	582	18.25%
1960	606	18.89%	1,034	32.23%	1,568	48.88%
1964	4,949	94.81%	271	5.19%	0	0.00%
1968	875	12.47%	1,079	15.37%	5,064	72.16%
1972	5,669	85.87%	871	13.19%	62	0.94%
1976	4,291	53.91%	3,600	45.23%	69	0.87%
1980	5,190	55.60%	4,015	43.01%	129	1.38%
1984	5,983	67.04%	2,894	32.43%	47	0.53%
1988	6,151	66.69%	3,016	32.70%	56	0.61%
1992	5,358	57.45%	3,213	34.45%	755	8.10%
1996	4,455	56.56%	2,851	36.19%	571	7.25%
2000	6,254	65.32%	3,227	33.71%	93	0.97%
2004	7,138	68.15%	3,272	31.24%	64	0.61%
2008	7,641	60.59%	4,817	38.20%	152	1.21%
2012	7,424	60.61%	4,723	38.56%	102	0.83%
2016	7,393	64.74%	3,874	33.93%	152	1.33%
2020	7,635	64.62%	4,037	34.17%	143	1.21%
2024	7,552	68.07%	3,479	31.36%	63	0.57%

== Education ==
Simpson County School District is the local school district.

It is in the district of Copiah–Lincoln Community College, and has been since 1934. The district maintains the Simpson County Center.

== See also ==
- Dry counties
- National Register of Historic Places listings in Simpson County, Mississippi
