= New Hebron, Mississippi =

- Town
- Flag Seal

- Location of New Hebron, Mississippi

- Location in the United States
- Coordinates: 31°43′59″N 89°58′55″W
- Country: United States
- State: Mississippi
- County: Lawrence

Area
  - Total: 0.67 sq mi (1.73 km^{2})
  - Land: 0.67 sq mi (1.73 km^{2})
  - Water: 0 sq mi (0.00 km^{2})
- Elevation: 371 ft (113 m)

Population (2024)
  - Total: 506
  - Density: 576.4/sq mi (222.55/km^{2})
- Time zone: UTC-6 (Central (CST))
  - Summer (DST): UTC-5 (CDT)
- ZIP code: 39140
- Area code: 601
- FIPS code: 28-51360
- GNIS feature ID: 0674644

New Hebron is a town in Lawrence County, Mississippi. A 2024 census puts the population at 506.

== Geography ==
According to the United States Census Bureau, the town has a total area of 0.7 square miles (1.8 km^{2}), all land.

== Demographics ==
Historical population
Census	Pop.	Note	%±
1910	191		—
1920	237		24.1%
1930	306		29.1%
1940	298		−2.6%
1950	303		1.7%
1960	271		−10.6%
1970	456		68.3%
1980	470		3.1%
1990	373		−20.6%
2000	447		19.8%
2010	447		0.0%
2020	386		−13.6%
U.S. Decennial Census

At the 2000 census, there were 447 people, 179 households and 124 families residing in the town. The population density was 668.1 inhabitants per square mile (258.0/km^{2}). There were 205 housing units at an average density of 306.4 per square mile (118.3/km^{2}). The racial makeup of the town was 93.96% White, 5.59% African American, and 0.45% from two or more races. Hispanic or Latino of any race were 1.34% of the population.

There were 179 households, of which 33.0% had children under the age of 18 living with them, 60.9% were married couples living together, 7.3% had a female householder with no husband present, and 30.2% were non-families. 29.1% of all households were made up of individuals, and 16.2% had someone living alone who was 65 years of age or older. The average household size was 2.50 and the average family size was 3.09.

26.6% of the population were under the age of 18, 8.1% from 18 to 24, 26.4% from 25 to 44, 21.5% from 45 to 64, and 17.4% who were 65 years of age or older. The median age was 36 years. For every 100 females, there were 82.4 males. For every 100 females age 18 and over, there were 87.4 males.

The median household income was $32,500 and the median family income was $37,679. Males had a median income of $31,094 and females $24,167. The per capita income was $15,495. About 9.8% of families and 14.6% of the population were below the poverty line, including 11.1% of those under age 18 and 15.3% of those age 65 or over.

== Education ==
The Town of New Hebron is served by the Lawrence County School District.

== Religion ==
New Hebron has three churches: New Hebron Pentecostal Church, New Hebron Baptist Church and New Hebron United Methodist Church.

== Notable people ==
- Erick Dampier - NBA player for the Dallas Mavericks; played at Lawrence County High School in Monticello and for Mississippi State University.
- Major Everett - running back in the NFL for the Philadelphia Eagles, Cleveland Browns and the Atlanta Falcons; played high school American football at New Hebron High School and at Mississippi College.
- John M. Perkins, Christian minister and civil rights activist
