= Mendenhall, Mississippi =

- City
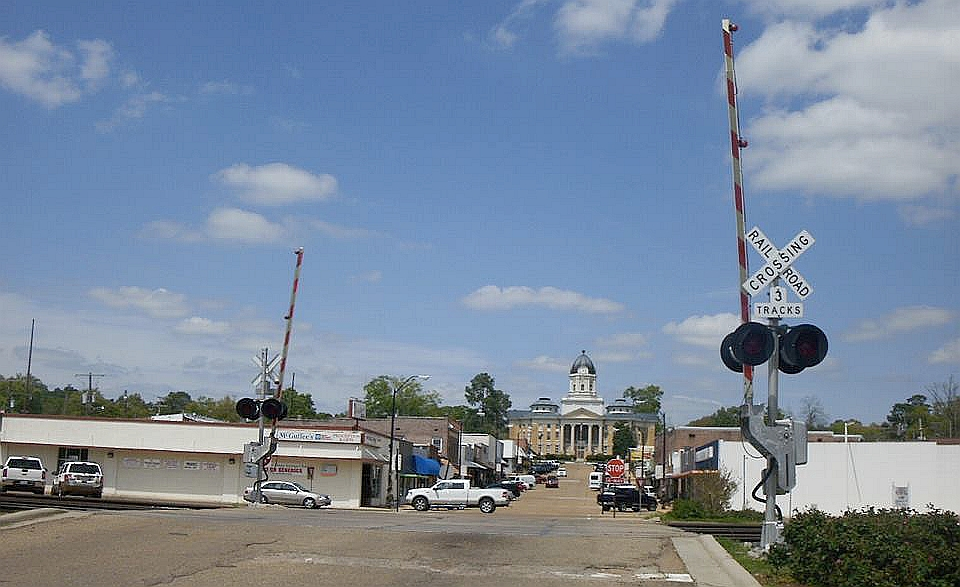
- Downtown Mendenhall in April 2014; the Simpson County Courthouse is seen in the background.

- Flag

- Location of Mendenhall, Mississippi

- Location in the United States
- Coordinates: 31°57′40″N 89°52′3″W
- Country: United States
- State: Mississippi
- County: Simpson

Government
  - Type: Mayor-Council
  - Mayor: Todd Booth
  - Board of Aldermen: Donnie Thomas; Robert Mangum; Jana Miller; Sandra Weeks; Tim Gray

Area
  - Total: 5.36 sq mi (13.89 km^{2})
  - Land: 5.35 sq mi (13.85 km^{2})
  - Water: 0.012 sq mi (0.03 km^{2})
- Elevation: 335 ft (102 m)

Population (2020)
  - Total: 2,199
  - Density: 411.1/sq mi (158.74/km^{2})
- Time zone: UTC−6 (Central (CST))
  - Summer (DST): UTC−5 (CDT)
- ZIP code: 39114
- Area code: 601
- FIPS code: 28-46600
- GNIS feature ID: 0673476
- Website: www.cityofmendenhall.com

Mendenhall is a city in and the county seat of Simpson County, Mississippi, United States. As of the 2020 census, Mendenhall had a population of 2,199. Mendenhall is part of the Jackson, Mississippi metropolitan area.

== History ==
Mendenhall was originally called Edna, to honor the wife of developer Phillip Didlake. After learning that a town with that name already existed in Mississippi, the city had its name changed to Mendenhall to honor Thomas Mendenhall, a citizen and lawyer from Westville, Mississippi (which has become a ghost town).

Mendenhall is the county seat of Simpson County. The county courthouse was built in 1907 by architect Andrew J. Byron.

Weathersby, named for one of its founding families, was an unincorporated census-designated community 2.7 miles (4.3 km) southeast of Mendenhall, and 7.4 miles (11.9 km) northeast of Magee. According to Charles Baldwin, Simpson County Tax Collector, Mendenhall annexed Weathersby in the 1980s.

== Geography ==
According to the United States Census Bureau, the city has a total area of 5.3 square miles (14 km^{2}), of which 5.3 square miles (14 km^{2}) is land and 0.04 square miles (0.10 km^{2}) (0.37%) is water.

== Demographics ==
Historical population
| Census | Pop. | Note | %± |
|---|---|---|---|
| 1910 | 606 | | — |
| 1920 | 637 | | 5.1% |
| 1930 | 919 | | 44.3% |
| 1940 | 1,282 | | 39.5% |
| 1950 | 1,539 | | 20.0% |
| 1960 | 1,946 | | 26.4% |
| 1970 | 2,402 | | 23.4% |
| 1980 | 2,533 | | 5.5% |
| 1990 | 2,463 | | −2.8% |
| 2000 | 2,555 | | 3.7% |
| 2010 | 2,504 | | −2.0% |
| 2020 | 2,199 | | −12.2% |
U.S. Decennial Census

=== 2020 census ===
As of the 2020 census, Mendenhall had a population of 2,199. The median age was 38.7 years. 25.1% of residents were under the age of 18 and 18.3% were 65 years of age or older. For every 100 females there were 87.8 males, and for every 100 females age 18 and over there were 84.3 males age 18 and over.

0.0% of residents lived in urban areas, while 100.0% lived in rural areas.

There were 888 households in Mendenhall, of which 35.0% had children under the age of 18 living in them. Of all households, 38.7% were married-couple households, 18.7% were households with a male householder and no spouse or partner present, and 37.2% were households with a female householder and no spouse or partner present. About 30.3% of all households were made up of individuals and 14.6% had someone living alone who was 65 years of age or older.

There were 1,060 housing units, of which 16.2% were vacant. The homeowner vacancy rate was 4.3% and the rental vacancy rate was 14.1%.

Mendenhall racial composition as of 2020
| | Num. | Perc. |
|---|---|---|
| White (non-Hispanic) | 1,348 | 61.3% |
| Black or African American (non-Hispanic) | 743 | 33.8% |
| Native American | 2 | 0.09% |
| Asian | 3 | 0.14% |
| Other/Mixed | 74 | 3.37% |
| Hispanic or Latino | 29 | 1.32% |

== Entertainment attractions ==
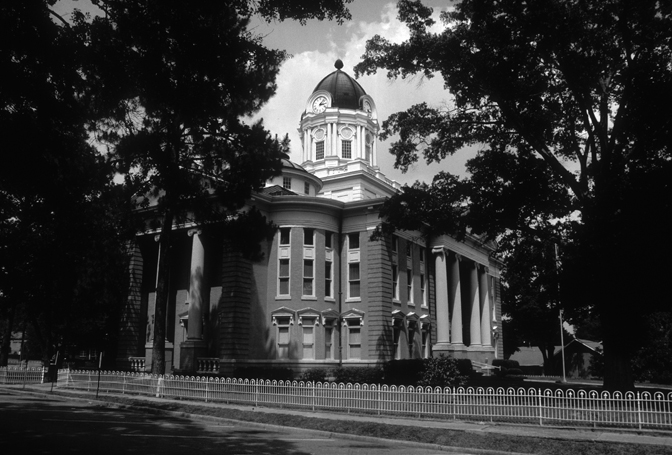
Simpson County Courthouse. Photo by Calvin Beale.

Mendenhall had a movie theatre called the Star Theatre, built by Edgar French, Ben Slay and Lonnie Burnham. Located on Main Street, the building boasted a one-screen auditorium with a balcony. It also featured a pool hall and three offices upstairs, one of which housed the city's Chamber of Commerce. The theatre opened for business on November 9, 1938 with the western Born to the West. The price of admission was 11 cents and a box of popcorn was a dime. A man from Prentiss was initially hired to run the theatre, but he was soon "sent packing" and Edgar French told his son, George Lewis French, "You're taking over that picture show".

Lewis French, who had worked in his father's ice plant growing up and was trained as a bookkeeper at Clarks Commercial College in Jackson, had no experience in running a movie theatre. He went to New Orleans to learn how to book movies and run the projection equipment. Aside from time spent serving in Europe as a radio man during World War II, French continued to operate the Star Theatre until he decided to close it in 1971.

During the late 1960s, the Star Theatre had problems with vandalism and growing racial tensions among its young patrons who objected to maintaining segregation. Under Jim Crow customs, black customers were required to sit in the segregated balcony and this only changed after new U.S. legislation was enacted and ended such practices.

In October 1979, a newly remodeled and fully integrated Star Theatre reopened. The theatre enjoyed revived popularity until competition from video arcades and cable TV forced Collins to close some three years later.

The theatre was repainted when used as a location for the film My Dog Skip. Heavy rains caused the roof to collapse in April 2008. The theatre burned down in 2016.

== Notable people ==
- Pauline Braddy, drummer
- Willie Camper, fourth-tallest verified human (8 ft 7 in)
- Chris Caughman, Mississippi state senator
- Xavier Dampeer, professional football player
- Larry Hardy, professional football player
- Stephen Hobbs, professional football player
- Bee King, Mississippi state senator
- John M. Perkins, civil rights activist
- Paul Ramsey, Christian ethicist
- Martinas Rankin, professional football player
- Clint Rotenberry, Mississippi state representative
- Price Wallace, Mississippi state representative
