= List of state highways in Mississippi =

- Standard route shields

Highway names
- Interstates: Interstate X (I-X)
- US Highways: U.S. Route X (US X)
- State: Mississippi Highway X (MS X)

System links
- Mississippi State Highway System; Interstate; US; State

State highways in Mississippi are maintained by the Mississippi Department of Transportation. The state numbers its highways in a grid-like pattern, much like the U.S. Route numbering scheme. One and two-digit routes are primary highways.

Odd-numbered routes run north–south and start from MS 1, which runs along the Mississippi River, to MS 25, which runs near the Alabama border. In addition to routes 1 through 25, routes 27 through 41 repeat this pattern over the first several routes, still increasing in number from west to east, and routes 43 and higher generally run in the southern part of the state.

Even-numbered routes run east–west; these start from MS 2, which runs near the Tennessee state line, and continue to MS 26, which runs in the southern part of the state. With the exception of MS 28, the next several even routes are aligned over routes 2 through 26 in a similar fashion.

== Exceptions to the numbering scheme ==
There are several state highways that are out of place; they do not fit the numbering scheme:

- MS 5 runs east of MS 7.
- MS 22 runs between MS 16 and MS 18.
- MS 23 runs east of MS 25.
- MS 27 runs between MS 33 and MS 35.
- MS 28 runs between MS 18 and MS 24, but it was MS 20 before I-20 was built.
- MS 29 runs between MS 37 and MS 39.
- MS 46 runs between MS 32 and MS 42.
- MS 50 runs between MS 32 and MS 42, but it was MS 10 before I-10 was built (this fit into the grid, between MS 8 and MS 12).
- MS 67 runs between MS 53 and MS 57, but it was MS 55 before I-55 was built.
- MS 76 was the number given to the Pontotoc bypass in place of MS 6; this may be the number for the entire Corridor V of the Appalachian Development Highway System The bypass was recently renamed MS 6/US 278 after the completion of the corridor portion that reconnects west of Tupelo. It has since been applied to another section of Corridor V in Itawamba County.

=== Three-digit highways ===
Three-digit highways are organized by their first digit. Routes beginning with a 1 are aborted alignments of U.S. Routes; these include highways 145, 149, 161, 172, 178, 182, 184, and 198. These highways are scattered over their "parent" routes, and have segments beginning and ending in several cities. The exception is MS 178, which covers almost all of the old road (US 78 was relocated onto a new freeway alignment throughout the entire state). U.S. Routes 11, 51, 65, 80, 90, and 278 do not have corresponding state highways (11, 51, 80 and 90 all largely parallel an Interstate highway, while 65 is extremely short within the state and 278 was only recently extended westward), but most of them have at least one aborted alignment.

Highway 245 in Okolona and Crawford is the only three-digit Mississippi Highway to begin with a 2. This is because it is the old alignment of Alternate US 45.

Mississippi highways 301 through 614 are secondary highways that are generally shorter than one- and two-digit highways. These routes are organized so that the 300s run in the northern part of the state, the 400s run in the north-central section, the 500s run in the south-central section, and the 600s run in the most southern section. These routes are numbered like other state highways, with odd routes running north–south and even routes running east–west. The numbering generally increases from the east / north to the west / south within their respective areas.

The state of Mississippi also maintains a system of mostly unsigned state highways, numbered ranging from 701 to 992.

Finally, Mississippi has several scenic highways that run near the state's lakes. These include Scenic Routes 32, 304, 315, and 333. They are signed with a blue shield and run loops connecting to the state's normal highways of the same number. For example, Scenic Route 304 runs from I-55 in Hernando along MS 304 west to MS 301, turning south to loop around Arkabutla Lake and connect to MS 306 and I-55 in Coldwater.

== List of numbered Mississippi state highways ==
Each of the numbered Mississippi state highways are listed below with their termini.

Number	Length (mi)	Length (km)	Southern or western terminus	Northern or eastern terminus	Formed	Removed	Notes
MS 1	154.074	247.958	US 61 in Onward	US 49 in Powell	1932	current	
MS 2	44.267	71.241	MS 5 near Hickory Flat	SR 22 at the Tennessee state line near Corinth	c. 1932	current	Two segments
MS 3	191.732	308.563	US 61 in Redwood	US 61 in Lake Cormorant	1932	current	
MS 4	159.755	257.101	Bailey Road in Fox Island	MS 25 in Dennis	1935	current	
MS 5	26.467	42.595	MS 178 / MS 705 in Hickory Flat	MS 7 near Michigan City	1932	current	Two segments
MS 6	138.811	223.395	MS 161 in Clarksdale	MS 25 in Amory	1932	current	
MS 7	168.209	270.706	US 49W / MS 12 in Belzoni	SR 18 at the Tennessee state line in Michigan City	1932	current	
MS 8	167.868	270.157	MS 1 in Rosedale	US 278 in Wise Gap	1932	current	
MS 9	116.118	186.874	MS 12 in Ackerman	MS 30 near New Albany	1932	current	
MS 9W	20.192	32.496	MS 9 near Bruce	MS 7 near Taylor	1956	current	
MS 12	199.020	320.292	MS 1 in James	SR 18 at the Alabama state line near Caledonia	1932	current	
MS 13	160.018	257.524	US 49 near Maxie	MS 25 near Carthage	1932	current	
MS 14	145.342	233.905	Levee Road in Mayersville	SR 32 at the Alabama state line near McLeod	1934	current	Two segments
MS 15	322.766	519.442	I-10 / I-110 near D'Iberville	SR 125 at the Tennessee state line near Walnut	1932	current	Two segments
MS 16	173.087	278.557	MS 1 in Grace	CR 30 at the Alabama state line near Scooba	1932	current	Two segments
MS 17	73.289	117.947	MS 161 in Farmhaven	CR 17 near North Carrollton	1939	current	
MS 18	180.142	289.910	Grand Gulf Road in Grand Gulf	CR 20 at the Alabama state line near Quitman	1932	current	Two segments; highway not signed on or west of US 61
MS 19	117.017	188.321	SR 10 at the Alabama state line near Whynot	US 51 in West	1932	current	
MS 21	79.857	128.517	MS 35 in Forest	MS 39 / MS 145 in Shuqualak	1950	current	
MS 22	42.899	69.039	I-20 / US 80 / MS 467 near Edwards	US 51 in Canton	1950	current	
MS 23	32.632	52.516	MS 25 in Smithville	SR 19 at the Alabama state line near Red Bay, AL	1950	current	
MS 24	75.922	122.185	Main Street in Fort Adams	I-55 / US 98 in McComb	1932	current	
MS 25	266.163	428.348	I-55 in Jackson	SR 18 at the Tennessee state line near North Crossroads	1932	current	
MS 26	77.050	124.000	LA 10 at the Louisiana state line near Bogalusa, LA	MS 198 in Lucedale	1932	current	
MS 27	120.920	194.602	LA 25 at the Louisiana state line near Tylertown	I-20 / US 61 / US 80 in Vicksburg	1937	current	
MS 28	126.299	203.259	US 61 / MS 33 in Fayette	US 84 in Calhoun	1958	current	
MS 29	76.680	123.404	MS 26 / MS 149 in Wiggins	MS 28 in Soso	1950	current	
MS 30	91.204	146.779	North Lamar Street / Molly Barr Road in Oxford	CR 98 in Mingo	1932	current	
MS 32	144.644	232.782	MS 1 in Perthshire	MS 41 / MS 245 in Okolona	1932	current	Two segments
MS 33	55.712	89.660	LA 19 at the Louisiana state line near Centreville	US 61 / MS 28 in Fayette	1950	current	
MS 35	274.412	441.623	LA 21 at the Louisiana state line near Twin	MS 315 / MS 315 Scenic in John W. Kyle State Park	1932	current	
MS 37	24.586	39.567	US 84 near Collins	MS 35 in Raleigh	c. 1950	current	
MS 39	49.757	80.076	I-20 / I-59 / US 11 / US 80 in Meridian	US 45 in Shuqualak	1932	current	
MS 41	31.375	50.493	US 45 / US 278 near Wren	MS 9 / MS 338 in Pontotoc	c. 1932	current	
MS 42	115.552	185.963	Rockport-New Hebron Road on the Lawrence-Simpson county line near New Hebron	SR 56 at the Alabama state line in State Line	1932	current	
MS 43	242.287	389.923	US 90 in Bay St. Louis	MS 407 near French Camp	1949	current	Four segments
MS 43A	6.560	10.557	MS 43 near Arm	MS 43 / MS 184 in Silver Creek	—	—	
MS 44	47.633	76.658	MS 570 in McComb	MS 42 near Sumrall	1949	current	Three segments
MS 46	23.234	37.391	Mantee Road in Mantee	MS 50 near West Point	c. 1944	current	
MS 47	23.048	37.092	MS 50 near West Point	MS 385 near Buena Vista	c. 1934	current	
MS 48	83.693	134.691	MS 24 / MS 33 in Centreville	MS 35 in Sandy Hook	1932	current	
MS 50	71.892	115.699	MS 9 in Walthall	SR 96 at the Alabama state line in Steens	1960	current	
MS 53	38.920	62.636	US 49 in Gulfport	US 11 / MS 26 in Poplarville	1950	current	
MS 57	98.408	158.372	US 90 in Fontainebleau	US 45 in State Line	1960	current	
MS 63	106.368	171.183	US 90 / MS 611 in Pascagoula	MS 184 in Waynesboro	1932	current	
MS 67	20.986	33.774	I-10 / I-110 in D'Iberville	US 49 in Saucier	1958	current	
MS 69	15.797	25.423	SR 14 at the Alabama state line near Forreston	Plymouth Road / Border Drive in Columbus	c. 1941	current	
MS 76	2.452	3.946	MS 23 in Itawamba County	SR 24 at the Alabama state line near Red Bay, Alabama	2013	current	Part of Appalachian Regional Corridor V; an unsigned 0.061-mile-long (0.098 km) segment in Tupelo connects US 278/MS 6 to International Boulevard
MS 145	115.681	186.171	US 45 near Waynesboro	Old US Highway 45 S at the Tennessee state line in Corinth	1977	current	Ten separate segments consisting of former portions of US 45
MS 149	58.073	93.459	US 49 near Wiggins	MS 161 in Clarksdale	—	—	Eight separate segments consisting of former portions of US 49 and US 49W
MS 161	19.872	31.981	US 61 / US 278 near Merigold	US 61 near Walls	1999	current	Three separate segments consisting of former portions of US 61
MS 172	11.913	19.172	US 72 / CR 961 near Burnsville	US 72 near Oldham	c. 1998	current	Former segment of US 72
MS 178	126.160	203.035	Old Highway 78 at the Tennessee state line in DeSoto	Harbor Road near Tremont	—	—	Three separate segments consisting of former portions of US 78
MS 182	42.880	69.009	US 82 near Greenville	CR 30 near Columbus	—	—	Seven separate segments consisting of former portions of US 82
MS 184	38.970	62.716	US 84 near Meadville	Dead end near Waynesboro	—	—	Nine separate segments consisting of former portions of US 84
MS 198	28.276	45.506	I-55 / US 98 in Summit	US 98 near Lucedale	—	—	Six separate segments consisting of former portions of US 98
MS 245	15.302	24.626	US 45 Alt. near Crawford	MS 145 in Shannon	c. 1998	current	Two separate segments consisting of former portions of US 45A
MS 301	23.336	37.556	MS 304 Scenic near Arkabutla	SR 175 at the Tennessee state line in Barnesville	1950	current	Two segments
MS 302	34.879	56.132	MS 161 in Walls	US 72 near Barton	1984	current	
MS 304	40.387	64.997	US 61 near Lake Cormorant	I-269 at the Tennessee state line near Olive Branch	1950	current	Mostly concurrent with I-69 and I-269
MS 305	30.785	49.544	Dead end at the Sardis Reservoir in Techville	State Line Road / Riverdale Road on the Tennessee state line in Olive Branch	1953	current	Two segments
MS 306	9.686	15.588	US 51 / MS 304 Scenic in Coldwater	MS 305 near Independence	c. 1952	current	
MS 309	25.777	41.484	MS 4 near Chulahoma	Byhalia Road on the Tennessee state line near Olive Branch	1956	current	
MS 310	44.484	71.590	MS 3 in Crenshaw	MS 7 in Malone	1950	current	
MS 311	12.779	20.566	MS 7 in Holly Springs	US 72 in Mt. Pleasant	1957	current	
MS 313	8.518	13.708	Holland Road / Old Hudsonville Road in Hudsonville	US 72 in Slayden	1949	current	
MS 314	7.278	11.713	CR 100 near Oxford	MS 7 / MS 334 in Oxford	1957	current	
MS 315	80.354	129.317	MS 9W in Paris	US 49 / US 61 near Rich	1953	current	Two segments
MS 316	22.778	36.658	Rozell Lane in Friars Point	US 278 / MS 6 near Marks	1956	current	
MS 321	9.131	14.695	MS 32 near Webb	MS 322 in Lambert	1956	current	Two segments
MS 322	43.859	70.584	MS 1 in Sherard	MS 35 near Crowder	1956	current	
MS 328	12.847	20.675	MS 315 near Water Valley	MS 7 near Markette	1957	current	
MS 330	33.271	53.544	US 51 near Tillatoba	MS 32 near Bruce	1950	current	
MS 331	13.439	21.628	MS 9 near Sarepta	MS 334 near Tula	1956	current	
MS 332	3.344	5.382	US 51 in Grenada	Toe Road near Grenada Lake	c. 1958	current	
MS 333	0.454	0.731	MS 8 in Grenada	MS 333 Scenic in Grenada	1958	current	Unsigned; fully concurrent with MS 333 Scenic
MS 334	27.772	44.695	MS 7 / MS 314 in Oxford	MS 9 near Pontotoc	1956	current	
MS 336	16.100	25.910	CR 251 / CR 287 in Lafayette Springs	MS 9 in Pontotoc	1958	current	
MS 338	11.943	19.220	US 278 / MS 6 near Thaxton	US 278 / MS 6 near Pontotoc	2007	current	
MS 340	10.144	16.325	CR 418 on the Calhoun-Chickasaw county line near Mantee	MS 15 in Woodland	1960	current	
MS 341	46.647	75.071	Hohenlinden Road on the Webster-Chickasaw county line near Mantee	MS 9 near Pontotoc	1956	current	
MS 342	7.793	12.542	MS 41 near Pontotoc	West Main Street / Faulkner Road near Pontotoc	1956	current	
MS 345	9.272	14.922	MS 9 in Pontotoc	MS 15 in Ecru	1958	current	
MS 346	9.644	15.521	Hurricane Road near Thaxton	MS 15 in Ecru	1958	current	
MS 347	3.577	5.757	MS 349 near Potts Camp	MS 349 near Potts Camp	1958	current	Unsigned, fully locally maintained
MS 348	21.441	34.506	MS 15 in New Albany	Mill Street in Guntown	1956	current	
MS 349	17.111	27.537	MS 30 near New Albany	MS 178 in Potts Camp	1953	current	
MS 350	12.933	20.814	MS 2 near Corinth	MS 25 near Counce, TN	1981	current	
MS 354	2.876	4.628	MS 15 in Walnut	CR 218 near Walnut	1956	current	
MS 355	11.931	19.201	MS 346 near Thaxton	MS 30 near New Albany	1957	current	
MS 356	16.627	26.759	Kossuth-Rienzi Road Near Rienzi	MS 365 near Jacinto	1956	current	
MS 362	10.057	16.185	MS 145 near Wheeler	CR 5051 near Marietta	1956	current	Three segments
MS 363	20.901	33.637	MS 178 near Fulton	MS 145 in Saltillo	1950	current	
MS 364	16.326	26.274	MS 30 near Booneville	MS 25 near Iuka	1950	current	Two segments
MS 365	23.278	37.462	MS 30 near Paden	MS 25 near Counce, TN	1950	current	
MS 366	8.692	13.988	MS 370 near Baldwyn	MS 371 in Marietta	1957	current	
MS 366	4.178	6.724	MS 25 in Belmont	Alabama state line at Fourth Street NW near Godlen	1958	current	
MS 367	3.977	6.400	MS 356 near Rienzi	CR 209 on the Alcorn-Tishomingo county line near Burnsville	1965	current	
MS 368	3.561	5.731	MS 2 / MS 15 in Blue Mountain	CR 700 near Blue Mountain	1956	current	
MS 369	10.212	16.435	MS 370 near Falkner	MS 15 near Walnut	1960	current	Unsigned, fully locally maintained; two segments
MS 370	50.723	81.631	MS 5 in Ashland	MS 371 near Kirkville	1956	current	Three segments
MS 371	44.347	71.370	MS 6 near Amory	MS 4 near New Site	1960	current	
MS 373	8.068	12.984	US 45 / MS 50 near Columbus	US 45 near New Hamilton	—	—	Two segments
MS 382	6.519	10.491	US 45A near Prairie	MS 25 near Aberdeen	—	—	
MS 385	11.008	17.716	MS 47 in Buena Vista	MS 32 in Van Vleet	—	—	Unsigned, fully locally maintained
MS 388	15.933	25.642	US 45A / MS 852 near Brooksville	SR 86 at the Alabama state line in Pickensville	c. 1957	current	
MS 389	25.126	40.436	MS 182 in Starkville	MS 8 in Houston	—	—	Two segments
MS 391	3.498	5.629	Brooksville Road near the Noxubee National Wildlife Refuge	Singleton Road on the Winston-Noxubee county line	—	—	Unsigned, fully locally maintained
MS 393	4.650	7.483	Nanih Waiya Road on the Neshoba-Winston county line at Nanih Waiya	MS 490 near Noxapater	—	—	
MS 395	14.645	23.569	MS 19 / CR 299 in Arlington	MS 15 / MS 490 in Noxapater	—	—	
MS 397	33.564	54.016	MS 16 near De Kalb	MS 14 in Louisville	—	—	
MS 403	3.303	5.316	US 82 / MS 15 in Mathiston	Old Highway 82 / Clarkson Road near Mathiston	—	—	
MS 404	18.797	30.251	I-55 / CR 174 near Duck Hill	MS 9 near Walthall	—	—	Two segments
MS 407	33.013	53.129	MS 12 near McCool	US 51 in Winona	—	—	Two segments
MS 411	14.513	23.356	MS 14 / CR 5001 near Zama	MS 12 / CR 3122 near McCool	—	—	
MS 413	23.352	37.581	MS 407 in Weir	MS 182 / MS 745 in Kilmichael	—	—	
MS 415	6.956	11.195	MS 9 near Ackerman	Natchez Trace Parkway / Chester Tomnolen Road near Chester	—	—	
MS 424	1.589	2.557	State Park Road in Holmes County State Park	US 51 near Durant	—	—	Unsigned
MS 425	0.975	1.569	CR 5205 in Ethel	MS 12 / CR 2101 near Ethel	—	—	Unsigned, fully locally maintained
MS 427	9.877	15.895	MS 484 / MS 488 near Pearl River	MS 25 near Marydell	—	—	Two segments
MS 429	21.737	34.982	Red Dog Road / Conway Road near Redwater	MS 12 / CR 4222 near Sallis	—	—	
MS 430	34.532	55.574	US 82 in Greenwood	US 51 in Vaiden	—	—	
MS 431	1.488	2.395	MS 429 in Sallis	MS 12 / CR 4213 near Sallis	—	—	
MS 432	16.511	26.572	MS 433 near Benton	US 51 near Pickens	—	—	
MS 433	55.864	89.904	US 61 near Valley Park	Ebenezer Coxburg Road near Zieglerville	—	—	Two segments; western segment unsigned
MS 434	4.056	6.527	US 61 near Anguilla	Richey Road / Delta City Road in Delta City	—	—	
MS 436	11.147	17.939	Lake Washington Road in Glen Allen	US 61 near Panther Burn	—	—	
MS 438	17.399	28.001	MS 1 in Wayside	Kinlock Road / Sunflower River Road near Arcola	—	—	
MS 440	6.944	11.175	MS 19 near West	MS 35 / CR 3231 in Hesterville	—	—	
MS 442	30.777	49.531	MS 448 near Shaw	US 49E near Schlater	—	—	
MS 444	6.584	10.596	MS 1 near Round Lake	US 61 / US 278 in Duncan	—	—	
MS 446	15.206	24.472	MS 1 near Benoit	US 61 in Boyle	—	—	
MS 448	31.015	49.914	MS 1 in Benoit	US 82 in Indianola	—	—	
MS 450	17.854	28.733	MS 1 near Scott	US 61 / US 278 near Shaw	—	—	
MS 454	4.826	7.767	US 82 / US 278 near Greenville	MS 1 near Greenville	—	—	
MS 462	4.623	7.440	US 61 near Port Gibson	Willows Road / Old Port Gibson Road in Wilows	—	—	
MS 463	10.056	16.184	US 51 in Madison	MS 22 near Madison	—	—	
MS 465	38.789	62.425	US 61 near Redwood	MS 1 near Fitler	—	—	
MS 467	13.897	22.365	Main Street / Port Gibson Street / Clinton Road in Raymond	I-20 / US 80 / MS 22 in Edward	—	—	
MS 468	20.404	32.837	MS 475 in Flowood	US 80 in Brandon	—	—	
MS 469	30.318	48.792	MS 28 near Georgetown	MS 468 near Brandon	—	—	
MS 471	17.762	28.585	US 80 in Brandon	MS 43 near Goshen Springs	—	—	
MS 472	25.825	41.561	Whitworth Street near Hazlehurst	MS 28 near Pinola	—	—	Two segments
MS 473	4.972	8.002	Terry Gatesville Road on the Copiah-Hinds county line near Terry	I-55 in Terry	—	—	
MS 475	7.407	11.920	MS 468 near Pearl	MS 25 in Flowood	—	—	
MS 476	0.750	1.207	US 80 / MS 18 in Jackson	Royal Oaks Drive / Robinson Street in Jackson	—	—	Unsigned, fully locally maintained
MS 477	0.575	0.925	MS 468 in Flowood	MS 25 in Flowood	—	—	Unsigned, fully locally maintained; southern extension to US 80 under construction
MS 478	7.028	11.310	MS 472 near Schley	MS 43 near Shivers	—	—	
MS 481	35.487	57.111	MS 35 near Burns	MS 43 in West Leesburg	—	—	
MS 482	7.761	12.490	MS 16 near Philadelphia	MS 491 near Bogue Chitto	—	—	
MS 483	9.034	14.539	MS 13 near Morton	Utah Road on the Leake-Scott county line near Leake	—	—	
MS 484	7.771	12.506	MS 488 near Madden	MS 427 / MS 488 near Pearl River	—	—	Unsigned, fully locally maintained
MS 485	4.082	6.569	MS 21 near Pearl River	MS 15 near Philadelphia	—	—	
MS 486	10.781	17.350	MS 16 in Philadelphia	MS 491 near DeWeese	—	—	
MS 487	25.944	41.753	MS 13 in Lena	MS 21 in Sebastopol	—	—	
MS 488	25.561	41.136	MS 35 near Carthage	MS 21 in Pearl River	—	—	
MS 489	22.215	35.752	US 80 in Lake	MS 492 in Union	—	—	
MS 490	18.242	29.358	MS 15 / MS 395 in Noxapater	Old MS 490 on the Winston-Noxubee county line near Mashulaville	—	—	
MS 491	19.287	31.039	MS 19 near Collinsville	MS 21 near Bogue Chitto	—	—	Two segments
MS 492	27.291	43.921	MS 35 near Walnut Grove	CR 298 / CR 4300 in House	—	—	Two segments
MS 493	34.807	56.016	46th Avenue / Poplar Springs Drive in Meridian	MS 397 near Bogue Chitto	—	—	Two segments; segment north of MS 16 is unsigned
MS 494	22.723	36.569	MS 15 in Union	MS 19 near Nellieburg	—	—	
MS 495	33.859	54.491	MS 493 near Meridian	MS 397 near Bogue Chitto	—	—	
MS 496	13.198	21.240	MS 19 near Meridian	CR 1 at the Alabama state line near Alamucha	—	—	
MS 498	1.000	1.609	US 45 near Porterville	Suarnooches-Porterville Road / Porterville-Alabama Road in Porterville	—	—	
MS 500	5.798	9.331	MS 13 in Lena	MS 487 near Lena	—	—	
MS 501	26.891	43.277	MS 18 near Sylvarena	US 80 in Forest	—	—	
MS 502	4.212	6.779	MS 488 near Standing Pine	MS 488 in Madden	—	—	Unsigned
MS 503	40.711	65.518	MS 528 near Heidelberg	MS 15 in Decatur	—	—	
MS 504	6.434	10.355	MS 15 near Newton	MS 503 / CR 24 near Rose Hill	—	—	
MS 505	6.592	10.609	Crosstrack Road near Newton	US 80 near Newton	—	—	
MS 508	2.219	3.571	US 45 near Waynesboro	Buckatunna-Mount Zion Road / Sturdivant Road near Waynesboro	—	—	Unsigned, fully locally maintained
MS 510	11.259	18.120	MS 145 near Shubuta	Matherville Frost Bridge Road near Matherville	—	—	
MS 511	6.598	10.618	CR 511 near Quitman	MS 18 in Quitman	—	—	
MS 512	9.295	14.959	CR 16 on the Clarke-Jasper county line near Pachuta	MS 18 / MS 145 in Quitman	—	—	Two segments
MS 513	23.692	38.129	MS 145 in Quitman	MS 18 in Rose Hill	—	—	
MS 514	8.547	13.755	MS 513 in Enterprise	MS 145 near Enterprise	—	—	
MS 528	23.682	38.112	MS 15 in Bay Springs	US 11 near Heidelberg	—	—	
MS 529	6.361	10.237	US 84 in Hebron	MS 28 in Gitano	—	—	
MS 531	12.114	19.496	MS 28 near Taylorsville	MS 18 in Bay Springs	—	—	
MS 532	16.035	25.806	MS 35 near Mount Olive	US 84 near Hebron	—	—	
MS 533	7.929	12.760	MS 28 in Soso	MS 15 / CR 157 near Stringer	—	—	
MS 535	5.589	8.995	MS 590 in Seminary	MS 588 in Eminence	—	—	
MS 536	21.322	34.314	MS 15 near Tuckers Crossing	MS 63 near Clara	—	—	
MS 537	16.160	26.007	North 5th Avenue / Northview Drive / Hoy Road in Laurel	MS 15 near Moss	—	—	
MS 540	32.320	52.014	MS 469 in Harrisville	MS 35 in Raleigh	—	—	Two segments
MS 541	36.167	58.205	Houston Road / Clem School Road near Mt. Carmel	MS 13 near Polkville	—	—	
MS 545	2.112	3.399	MS 28 near Magee	MS 149 in Magee	—	—	
MS 547	25.081	40.364	MS 28 in Allen	US 61 in Port Gibson	—	—	
MS 548	5.097	8.203	Abby Road near Hermanville	Old Port Gibson Road on the Claiborne-Copiah county line near Hermanville	—	—	
MS 550	23.144	37.247	MS 28 in Union Church	MS 184 in Brookhaven	—	—	
MS 552	30.633	49.299	Rodney Westside Road near Lorman	MS 28 near Union Church	—	—	Two segments
MS 553	23.041	37.081	US 61 in Stanton	Old Highway 61 / Popps Road / Harriston Road in Harriston	—	—	
MS 554	5.628	9.057	MS 555 near Natchez	US 61 near Stanton	1973	current	
MS 555	13.302	21.407	Ogden Road / Kingston Road near Kingston	Church Hill Road / Annas Bottom Road near Anna	1957	current	Two segments
MS 556	3.009	4.843	MS 184 in Meadville	US 98 near Bude	c. 1953	current	
MS 558	2.107	3.391	Brookway Boulevard / Saints Trail NW near Brookhaven	MS 184 in Brookhaven	—	—	
MS 563	18.514	29.795	US 61 near Woodville	MS 33 near Crosby	—	—	
MS 567	17.444	28.073	MS 24 near Liberty	US 98 near Smithdale	—	—	
MS 568	16.766	26.982	LA 43 at the Louisiana state line near Gillsburg	US 51 near Magnolia	—	—	
MS 569	31.867	51.285	LA 67 at the Louisiana state line near Woodland, LA	US 98 near Auburn	—	—	
MS 570	30.247	48.678	US 98 near Smithdale	MS 44 near Pricedale	—	—	Two segments
MS 571	1.738	2.797	LA 441 at the Louisiana state line near Gillsburg	MS 584 near Gillsburg	—	—	
MS 575	4.780	7.693	Liberty Street / Mt. Hermon Road / Magnolia Progress Road in Progress	MS 48 near Progress	—	—	
MS 583	39.635	63.786	MS 27 in Tylertown	MS 184 in Brookhaven	—	—	
MS 584	25.335	40.773	MS 24 / MS 48 / MS 569 in Liberty	US 51 in Osyka	—	—	
MS 585	10.323	16.613	US 98 near Tylertown	MS 586 in Darbun	—	—	
MS 586	12.097	19.468	MS 585 in Darbun	MS 587 in Foxworth	—	—	
MS 587	29.976	48.242	US 98 / MS 35 in Foxworth	MS 184 in Monticello	—	—	
MS 588	21.378	34.405	US 84 near Collins	MS 29 in Ellisville	—	—	
MS 589	35.757	57.545	I-59 in Purvis	US 49 near Seminary	—	—	
MS 590	22.233	35.781	US 49 near Seminary	MS 29 near Ellisville	—	—	
MS 591	0.184	0.296	MS 570 near Summit	Highway 570 near Summit	—	—	Unsigned
MS 594	5.643	9.082	MS 57 / MS 63 near Leakesville	CR 96 at the Alabama state line near Leakesville	—	—	
MS 598	3.027	4.871	US 49 near Sanford	Old Highway 49 in Sanford	—	—	
MS 601	5.42	8.72	I-10	US 90	proposed	—	Proposed route at the Port of Gulfport; also referred to as I-310
MS 603	24.973	40.190	US 90 / MS 43 in Waveland	MS 53 near Necaise	—	—	
MS 604	5.107	8.219	US 90 in Pearlington	MS 607 near Pearlington	—	—	
MS 605	12.277	19.758	US 90 in Gulfport	MS 67 near Success	—	—	
MS 606	11.801	18.992	Silver Slipper Casino near Waveland	Dead end at Jourdan River boat launch in Bay St. Louis	—	—	Unsigned, fully locally maintained
MS 607	9.776	15.733	US 90 near Shoreline Park	I-59 / US 11 near Picayune	—	—	Two segments
MS 609	20.510	33.008	US 90 in Ocean Springs	Vestry Road in Vestry	—	—	Two segments; northern segment is unsigned
MS 611	4.962	7.986	Chevron refinery entrance near Pascagoula	MS 613 in Pascagoula	—	—	Two segments; western segment is unsigned
MS 612	7.050	11.346	MS 613 near Agricola	CR 7 at the Alabama state line near Wilmer, AL	—	—	
MS 613	45.649	73.465	US 90 in Pascagoula	MS 198 in Lucedale	—	—	
MS 614	10.327	16.620	MS 63 in Wade	CR 56 at the Alabama state line near Hurley	—	—	
MS 615	4.873	7.842	US 90	MS 67	proposed	—	Proposed connector in eastern Harrison County
MS 617	1.716	2.762	Port of Pascagoula in Pascagoula	US 90 in Pascagoula	2002	current	
MS 618	4.910	7.902	MS 613 in Moss Point	US 90 near Moss Point	—	—	
MS 619	2.816	4.532	Naval Station Pascagoula in Pascagoula	MS 617 in Pascagoula	—	—	
MS 621	3.241	5.216	US 49 / MS 53 in Gulfport	John Ross Road / Highland Circle / Lorraine Road in Gulfport	—	—	Unsigned; two segments; future extensions to I-10 and connecting the current segments proposed
Proposed and unbuilt

== Highways numbered above 700 ==
Highways that are legislatively numbered between 701 and 994 run mostly along main streets and major roads through the state's towns and cities. Many of these routes are unsigned. The 700s run through the northern part of Mississippi, the 800s run through the central part, and the 900s run through the southern part. These roads are generally not arranged in any pattern because they are so short (many run less than a mile).

=== Northern Mississippi (701-795) ===
Number	Length (mi)	Length (km)	Southern or western terminus	Northern or eastern terminus	Formed	Removed	Notes
MS 701	0.559	0.900	MS 178 in Potts Camp	MS 178 in Potts Camp	—	—	Unsigned, fully locally maintained
MS 702	0.310	0.499	MS 7 in Michigan City	Jackson Street in Michigan City	—	—	Formerly signed, fully locally maintained
MS 703	1.837	2.956	MS 178 in Byhalia	MS 178 in Byhalia	—	—	Unsigned, fully locally maintained
MS 704	0.540	0.869	MS 7 in Lamar	Lamar Road in Lamar	—	—	
MS 705	0.797	1.283	MS 178 in Hickory Flat	MS 5 / MS 178 in Hickory Flat	—	—	Unsigned, fully locally maintained
MS 706	0.375	0.604	Depot Street / School Street in Sidon	US 49E / CR 557 near Sidon	—	—	
MS 713	8.282	13.329	US 61 in Tunica Resorts	I-69 / MS 304 near Lake Cormorant	2006	current	
MS 714	0.295	0.475	Main Street / Hill Street in Sledge	MS 3 in Sledge	—	—	
MS 716	1.517	2.441	Six Mile Lake Road on the Quitman-Tunica county line near Sledge	MS 315 near Sledge	—	—	Unsigned, fully locally maintained
MS 718	0.823	1.324	Herron Road in Courtland	US 51 in Courtland	—	—	
MS 720	0.799	1.286	US 51 near Pope	I-55 near Pope	—	—	
MS 722	0.681	1.096	Main Street / Pecan Street in Pope	US 51 in Pope	—	—	
MS 723	1.083	1.743	MS 32 near Bruce	CR 233 near Bruce	—	—	Unsigned, fully locally maintained
MS 724	1.708	2.749	MS 32 Scenic in Enid	US 51 near Enid	—	—	
MS 725	0.355	0.571	US 278 / MS 6 in Batesville	Panola Avenue / Broadway Street in Batesville	—	—	
MS 726	0.376	0.605	Hopson Street in Tutwiler	US 49 near Tutwiler	—	—	
MS 727	1.188	1.912	MS 32 near Oakland	US 51 / CR 211 in Oakland	—	—	
MS 728	0.653	1.051	US 49E near Sumner	North Street / Walnut Street in Sumner	—	—	
MS 729	0.384	0.618	US 51 / MS 333 Scenic near Grenada	I-55 / MS 7 / MS 333 Scenic near Grenada	1958	current	Unsigned; fully concurrent with MS 333 Scenic
MS 731	2.103	3.384	MS 35 near Kosciusko	MS 12 / MS 19 / MS 35 / MS 43 in Kosciusko	—	—	Partially signed
MS 732	1.139	1.833	MS 35 near Charleston	Tallaha Road near Charleston	—	—	
MS 733	0.888	1.429	MS 328 in Taylor	Old Taylor Road in Taylor	—	—	
MS 734	0.340	0.547	US 49E near Glendora	Main Street / Swan Lake Road in Glendora	—	—	
MS 735	4.135	6.655	MS 12 / MS 43 near Kosciusko	MS 12 in Kosciusko	—	—	
MS 736	2.023	3.256	MS 35 near Kosciusko	MS 14 near Kosciusko	—	—	
MS 738	0.718	1.156	MS 334 in Oxford	US 278 / MS 6 near Oxford	—	—	Unsigned
MS 739	1.780	2.865	MS 12 near Ethel	MS 12 in Ethel	—	—	
MS 740	1.525	2.454	US 51 in Senatobia	Shans Bottom Road near Senatobia	—	—	Possible future bypass for Mississippi Highway 4
MS 741	0.808	1.300	MS 35 / CR 1022 near Kosciusko	CR 1022 near Kosciusko	—	—	
MS 743	0.376	0.605	US 49E / US 82 / MS 7 in Greenwood	Main Street / South Street in Greenwood	—	—	Unsigned
MS 744	0.178	0.286	Dr. Martin Luther King Jr. Drive / Avenue M in Greenwood	US 82 / MS 7 in Greenwood	—	—	Unsigned
MS 745	0.719	1.157	MS 182 in Kilmichael	MS 182 / MS 413 in Kilmichael	—	—	
MS 747	4.243	6.828	Church Road / Getwell Road in DeSoto	SR 176 at the Tennessee state line in DeSoto	—	—	Unsigned, fully locally maintained
MS 758	0.272	0.438	North Church Avenue near Louisville	MS 15 / MS 25 near Louisville	—	—	Unsigned
MS 759	2.637	4.244	MS 12 near Ackerman	MS 12 near Ackerman	—	—	Unsigned
MS 760	1.622	2.610	MS 25 / CR 864 in Belmont	MS 366 in Golden	—	—	Unsigned
MS 761	0.119	0.192	MS 178 in Myrtle	Springdale Avenue / Bankhead Street in Myrtle	—	—	Unsigned
MS 762	1.267	2.039	CR 90 / CR 101 in Ingomar	MS 15 / CR 110 near Ingomar	—	—	
MS 763	2.317	3.729	US 82 near Maben	MS 15 in Maben	—	—	
MS 764	0.241	0.388	MS 9 in Blue Springs	CR 278 in Blue Springs	—	—	Unsigned
MS 765	0.509	0.819	Natchez Trace Parkway in Cumberland	MS 50 in Cumberland	—	—	
MS 766	1.242	1.999	MS 145 in Saltillo	MS 363 in Saltillo	1998	current	
MS 767	3.358	5.404	MS 25 near Belmont	4th Avenue S at the Alabama state line in Red Bay, Alabama	—	—	Unsigned, fully locally maintained
MS 768	1.990	3.203	MS 15 near Ackerman	Work Center Road / Choctaw Lake Road near Ackerman	—	—	Unsigned, fully locally maintained
MS 768A	0.913	1.469	MS 768 in the Tombigbee National Forest	MS 768A at Choctaw Lake	—	—	Unsigned, fully locally maintained
MS 769	4.648	7.480	MS 145 in Tupelo	MS 145 in Tupelo	—	—	Unsigned, fully locally maintained
MS 770	0.221	0.356	MS 9 / MS 338 in Pontotoc	MS 15 in Pontotoc	—	—	Unsigned
MS 772	1.094	1.761	CR 123 in Algoma	MS 15 / CR 124 in Algoma	—	—	
MS 773	1.915	3.082	MS 2 near Ripley	CR 500 / CR 549 near Ripley	2004	current	
MS 774	0.208	0.335	MS 145 in Nettleton	MS 6 in Nettleton	—	—	Unsigned
MS 775	0.334	0.538	MS 12 in Starkville	Hill Top Drive / Bully Boulevard in Starkville	—	—	Unsigned
MS 776	3.687	5.934	MS 6 near Nettleton	MS 371 near Amory	—	—	Unsigned, fully locally maintained
MS 777	1.080	1.738	MS 15 near Walnut	J.O. Smith Drive in Walnut	—	—	Unsigned, fully locally maintained
MS 778	0.936	1.506	Dead end in Sherman	MS 178 in Sherman	—	—	Unsigned, fully locally maintained
MS 779	0.165	0.266	US 72 in Glen	CR 262 in Glen	—	—	Unsigned, fully locally maintained
MS 780	5.042	8.114	CR 203 near Blue Springs	MS 9 in Sherman	2009	current	Unsigned
MS 781	0.236	0.380	Davis Lane / Cedar Bluff Loop in Cedarbluff	MS 50 in Cedarbluff	—	—	Unsigned, fully locally maintained
MS 782	0.218	0.351	MS 46 in Mantee	MS 15 in Mantee	—	—	
MS 784	0.740	1.191	MS 9 in Walthall	MS 9 in Walthall	—	—	
MS 785	0.794	1.278	US 72 / CR 607 in Corinth	Cass Street / Wick Street in Corinth	—	—	
MS 786	0.953	1.534	Eastgate Road / Land Road near Columbus Air Force Base	US 45 near Columbus	—	—	
MS 788	0.492	0.792	US 45A near Artesia	Front Street in Artesia	—	—	
MS 789	6.581	10.591	MS 791 near Mayhew	US 45 near Columbus	—	—	
MS 790	2.275	3.661	MS 9 near Ackerman	MS 15 near Ackerman	—	—	
MS 791	3.671	5.908	Artesia Road near Artesia	North Frontage Road near Mayhew	2008	current	
MS 792	13.077	21.045	US 45 near Trinity	MS 388 near Brooksville	1998	current	
MS 793	0.346	0.557	MS 30 / CR 961 near Paden	Stephens Street in Paden	—	—	Unsigned
MS 795	4.396	7.075	Nashville Ferry Road / Nouryon plant driveway near Columbus	MS 69 in Columbus	—	—	

=== Central Mississippi (801-897) ===
Number	Length (mi)	Length (km)	Southern or western terminus	Northern or eastern terminus	Formed	Removed	Notes
MS 801	2.853	4.591	US 51 in Crystal Springs	Frontage Road on the Copiah-Hinds county line near Crystal Springs	—	—	
MS 802	0.756	1.217	US 61 / US 278 in Alligator	Jenkins Street in Alligator	—	—	
MS 804	1.034	1.664	MS 1 near Gunnison	MS 1 in Gunnison	—	—	
MS 806	0.977	1.572	US 49W near Isola	US 49W in Isola	—	—	Unsigned, fully locally maintained
MS 808	0.556	0.895	MS 18 in Port Gibson	US 61 near Port Gibson	—	—	Unsigned, fully locally maintained; gap in route at Bayou Pierre
MS 809	0.652	1.049	Industrial Road / Harbor Front Road in Greenville	US 84 / US 278 in Greenville	—	—	Unsigned
MS 810	0.320	0.515	Quiver Street / Delta Avenue in Sunflower	US 49W near Sunflower	—	—	Unsigned, fully locally maintained
MS 812	0.592	0.953	Sunflower Street / South Front Avenue in Ruleville	US 49W in Ruleville	—	—	Unsigned, fully locally maintained
MS 814	5.917	9.522	MS 1 in Greenville	MS 1 in Greenville	—	—	Unsigned
MS 816	0.156	0.251	Pond Avenue / East Grand Avenue in Inverness	MS 149 in Inverness	—	—	Unsigned
MS 817	0.245	0.394	Jenny Washington Street / J. W. Matthews Street in Pace	MS 8 near Pace	—	—	
MS 818	0.234	0.377	Main Street / Railroad Street in Cruger	US 49E in Crueger	—	—	Unsigned
MS 819	0.332	0.534	Old Highway 18 in Hermanville	MS 18 in Hermanville	—	—	
MS 820	0.258	0.415	West Park Avenue / North Main Street in Drew	US 49W in Drew	—	—	Unsigned, fully locally maintained
MS 822	6.483	10.433	Frontage Road in Vicksburg	Old US Highway 80 in Bovina	1998	current	
MS 824	0.333	0.536	Jefferson Street / Holland Street / Rolling Fork Road in Anguilla	US 61 / MS 14 in Anguilla	1998	current	
MS 826	2.316	3.727	US 61 near Rolling Fork	MS 14 near Rolling Fork	c. 1957	current	
MS 830	2.140	3.444	US 49 in Bentonia	US 49 in Bentonia	—	—	
MS 832	0.096	0.154	5th Avenue / West Pond Street in Doddsville	US 49W / MS 442 in Doddsville	—	—	Unsigned, fully locally maintained
MS 834	2.407	3.874	Harbor Industrial Park	US 61 in Warren County	proposed	—	Proposed
MS 835	0.437	0.703	US 49E / MS 12 in Tchula	Main Street / Front Street in Tchula	—	—	
MS 836	0.253	0.407	MS 17 in Lexington	MS 12 in Lexington	—	—	
MS 844	0.457	0.735	I-55 near Crystal Springs	US 51 near Crystal Springs	c. 1967	current	
MS 848	0.546	0.879	Bahala Street / South Street in Beauregard	US 51 in Beauregard	—	—	Unsigned
MS 850	0.364	0.586	US 51 in Wesson	Mission Hill Road / Lester R. Furr Drive in Wesson	—	—	
MS 852	1.756	2.826	US 45 near Brooksville	US 45A / MS 388 near Brooksville	—	—	Unsigned
MS 853	1.319	2.123	MS 486 near Tucker	MS 16 near Philadelphia	—	—	Unsigned, fully locally maintained
MS 854	3.460	5.568	MS 39 near Meridian Station	Rabbit Road / Naval Air Station Meridian entrance in Meridian Station	—	—	
MS 855	1.001	1.611	MS 890 in Bolton	I-20 in Bolton	—	—	Unsigned
MS 857	4.504	7.248	Calhoun Parkway near Wellington	Nissan Parkway near Canton	—	—	
MS 859	0.535	0.861	Old Jackson Road / Church Road near Wellington	MS 857 near Wellington	—	—	Unsigned
MS 860	0.491	0.790	MS 857 near Canton	Nissan plant entrance near Canton	—	—	Unsigned
MS 878	1.038	1.670	MS 492 in Walnut Grove	MS 35 in Walnut Grove	—	—	
MS 881	0.297	0.478	US 80 near Newton	Church Street near Newton	—	—	Unsigned
MS 882	0.415	0.668	MS 35 in Harpersville	MS 35 in Harpersville	—	—	
MS 883	0.824	1.326	Decatur Street / 3rd Street in Newton	US 80 in Newton	—	—	
MS 884	4.324	6.959	Old Highway 45 / 23rd Street in Meridian	US 45 in Meridian	—	—	Unsigned
MS 885	0.188	0.303	MS 15 in Philadelphia	MS 16 / MS 21 in Philadelphia	—	—	Unsigned
MS 886	1.030	1.658	I-55 in Ridgeland	US 51 in Ridgeland	—	—	Unsigned
MS 888	1.088	1.751	Dead end in Roosevelt State Park	MS 13 in Morton	—	—	
MS 889	1.143	1.839	US 80 in Chunky	I-20 near Chunky	—	—	Unsigned; exit 121 on I-20
MS 890	5.060	8.143	Old Highway 30 near Bolton	Old Highway 80 near Clinton	—	—	
MS 892	0.360	0.579	MS 35 in Homewood	Morton-Marathon Road / Old Homesville Road in Homewood	—	—	
MS 894	4.804	7.731	MS 19 in Philadelphia	MS 482 near Philadelphia	—	—	Unsigned, fully locally maintained
MS 895	2.211	3.558	US 11 near Toomsuba	Lauderdale Toomsuba Road near Toomsuba	—	—	
MS 897	0.818	1.316	MS 496 near Alamucha	CR 6 at the Alabama state line near Alamucha	—	—	Unsigned, fully locally maintained
Proposed and unbuilt

=== Southern Mississippi (902-992) ===
Number	Length (mi)	Length (km)	Southern or western terminus	Northern or eastern terminus	Formed	Removed	Notes
MS 902	4.261	6.857	MS 481 near Burns	MS 35 near Lorena	c. 1967	current	
MS 903	1.494	2.404	US 84 near Monticello	Lake Mary Crawford near Monticello	—	—	Unsigned, fully locally maintained
MS 904	13.000	20.921	Timberland Road NE / Port Barry Lane NE near Wesson	MS 27 near Wanilla	—	—	Unsigned, fully locally maintained
MS 905	2.259	3.636	US 51 near McComb	US 98 in McComb	—	—	Unsigned, fully locally maintained
MS 906	1.852	2.981	US 51 in Summit	MS 570 near Summit	—	—	Unsigned
MS 908	1.920	3.090	US 51 / MS 198 in Summit	MS 927 near Summit	—	—	Unsigned
MS 911	0.311	0.501	MS 24 in Gloster	Tate Street / East Railroad Avenue in Gloster	—	—	Unsigned, fully locally maintained
MS 913	0.192	0.309	Main Street in Gloster	MS 24 in Gloster	—	—	Unsigned, fully locally maintained
MS 915	0.075	0.121	MS 43 in New Hebron	MS 42 in New Hebron	—	—	Unsigned
MS 917	0.449	0.723	MS 18 in Sylvarena	MS 18 in Sylvarena	—	—	Unsigned
MS 923	2.340	3.766	LA 1053 at the Louisiana state line near Osyka	MS 584 near Osyka	1963	current	
MS 925	0.267	0.430	US 84 / US 425 in Natchez	South Canal Street in Natchez	—	—	Unsigned
MS 927	0.484	0.779	MS 906 near Summit	MS 908 near Summit	—	—	Unsigned
MS 928	0.330	0.531	US 84 / US 425 in Natchez	Choctaw Street / Homochitto Street in Natchez	—	—	Unsigned
MS 930	1.287	2.071	East Franklin Street / Melrose Avenue / Liberty Road / Junkin Street in Natchez	US 61 / US 84 in Natchez	—	—	Unsigned; eastbound carriageway of D'Evereaux Drive
MS 932	1.345	2.165	Liberty Road / Offerrall Street / St. Catherine Street in Natchez	US 61 / US 84 in Natchez	—	—	Unsigned; westbound carriageway of D'Evereaux Drive
MS 937	0.252	0.406	MS 13 / MS 184 in Prentiss	MS 42 in Prentiss	—	—	Unsigned
MS 938	0.437	0.703	MS 570 in McComb	MDOT District 7 gate in McComb	—	—	Unsigned
MS 946	0.584	0.940	Gordon Street / Joseph Street in Centreville	MS 24 in Centreville	—	—	Unsigned
MS 952	0.385	0.620	MS 513 in Enterprise	US 11 in Enterprise	—	—	Unsigned
MS 967	0.374	0.602	Main Street / 8th Street in Hattiesburg	McGilvary Road in Hattiesburg	—	—	Unsigned
MS 969	0.812	1.307	US 49 in Hattiesburg	Edwards Street / Barkley Road in Hattiesburg	—	—	Unsigned
MS 992	1.231	1.981	Beech Street in Picayune	MS 43 near Picayune	—	—	Signed as MS 43 Spur

== Scenic routes ==
These are specially designated state highways that run around the state's many dams (entirely in the northern part of the state). They are numbered the same as a nearby highway, with most serving as a spur or loop off of said highway. All of them connect to Interstate 55 at least once.

- MS 32 Scenic - Enid Dam; runs from I-55/MS 32 in Oakland to US 51 near Pope
- MS 304 Scenic - Arkabutla Dam; runs from I-55/MS 306 in Coldwater to I-55 in Hernando (until 2006, it connected to its parent, MS 304, with the two running concurrently with each other between Eudora and I-55 in Hernando)
- MS 315 Scenic - Sardis Dam; runs from US 51/MS 35 in Batesville to I-55/MS 315 in Sardis
- MS 333 Scenic - Grenada Dam; runs from I-55/MS 8 in Grenada to I-55/US 51/MS 7 north of Grenada (only one that both its parent route, MS 333, is unsigned, as well as entirely overlapping its parent)

=== Special exception ===
- MS 5

Mississippi Highway 5 is labeled, and signed into law since March 2, 1989, as a scenic route for its entirety. This is not a separate scenic route, nor is it signed with the iconic blue shields. It does however have the scenic route markers above the number shield throughout its length except for the intersection with US 72.

== Former highways ==
- MS 10 - former designation for MS 50
- MS 13W - former designation for MS 35 south of Columbia
- MS 20 - former designation for MS 28
- MS 22 - formerly the designation for what is now US 84 west of Waynesboro
- MS 23 - formerly ran from Starkville to south of West Point; this became part of MS 25 and is now Old West Point Road
- MS 35W - became mainline MS 35
- MS 35E - former designation for MS 37
- MS 45W - former designation for US 45 Alternate
- MS 55 - former designation for MS 67
- MS 57 - formerly the designation for what is now MS 15 from MS 26 to Biloxi
- MS 59 - former designation for MS 57
- MS 76 - former temporary designation for the western section of the Pontotoc Parkway in Pontotoc, now MS 6/US 278
- MS 308 - was located entirely in Tunica County; ran from US 61 near Maud through Dubbs to MS 4 near White Oak.
- MS 317 - MS 4 west of Ashland to US 78 east of Lake Center
- MS 320 - MS 32 through Banner to MS 9 east of Banner
- MS 323 - Former designation for what is now MS 1 between Sherard (at intersection with MS 322) to northern end at intersection with US 49
- MS 325 - Tippo Road; ran from MS 8 in Philipp, north through Macel, Tippo, and Effie to MS 32 in Cowart
- MS 326 - Cascilla Road; ran from MS 35 in Leverett, through Cascilla, to US 51 between Tillatoba and Grenada
- MS 335 - ran from MS 8 near Gore Springs to MS 330 near Gums
- MS 338 - formerly the designation for what is now Antioch Road from MS 334 in Toccopola to MS 9
- MS 344 - Algoma Road; ran from MS 341 to MS 15 in Algoma
- MS 351 - from the Alcorn-Tippah county line to MS 2 near Gorforth's Place
- MS 353 - Tippah County Road 500 (CR 500); ran from MS 15 in Ripley to MS 2
- MS 358 - ran from US 72 in Iuka east to the Alabama state line
- MS 375 - ran from MS 12 north to Caledonia at MS 378
- MS 378 - US 45 east via Caledonia to MS 12
- MS 379 - from the Itawamba-Monroe county line to MS 371 near Evergreen
- MS 405 - Fentress-Panhandle Road; ran from MS 12 in Fentress to MS 14
- MS 406 - Old Gauley Road/ Old Hwy 8; ran from Calhoun City to Grenada Lake
- MS 414 - Hester Road; ran from MS 9 to MS 15 north of Reform
- MS 426 - MS 16 southeast to MS 427 south of Edinburg
- MS 428 - US 49W near Inverness to MS 7 via Inverness Road
- MS 435 - US 49E at Cruger to MS 12
- MS 437 - MS 16 to MS 43 via Forest Grove Road
- MS 455 - MS 35 south of Kosciusko to MS 25 via Nile Road, County Road 1101, and Rocky Point Road
- MS 457 - Attala? appears only as a floating shield on 1958 map; MS 14/19 southwest to MS 35
- MS 460 - US 51 south of Canton east to MS 3 via Yandell Road
- MS 461 - US 61 in Vicksburg to MS 462 via Fisher Ferry Road
- MS 470 - northeast from MS 468 at Whitfield
- MS 480 - MS 15 to MS 485 via CR 418
- MS 507 - CR 20 and CR 31 from MS 503 to MS 18 in Rose Hill
- MS 534 - MS 15 in Larel via Lower Myrick Road and Mill Creek Road
- MS 539 - US 84 in Collins to MS 532 via Salem Church Road
- MS 543 - MS 35 in Raleigh west via current MS 540; then followed Dry Creek Road
- MS 551 - Liberty Road from US 61 (no longer part of it now) in Natchez to MS 33
- MS 572 - ran from Centreville to MS 569 near Liberty
- MS 574 - MS 33 in Gloster northeast via Busy Corner Road to MS 567
- MS 577 - ran from the Louisiana state line (LA 62) to MS 48 near Sandy Hook
- MS 600 - ran from US 11 in Carriere to MS 603 in Necaise
- MS 602 - ran from MS 43 near Logtown to US 11/MS 43 Picayune
- MS 615 - formerly the designation for what is now MS 57 from US 45 to MS 594 (which at the time continued west to US 98 via what is now MS 57)
- MS 730 - former spur from US 51 into Tillatoba. No longer on the route log.
- MS 737 - former loop off of MS 178 through Red Banks. No longer on the route log.
- MS 828 - former spur from US 49E into Yazoo City. No longer on the route log.
- MS 923 - formerly the designation for what is now MS 571
- MS 975 - former designation for what is now MS 605 south of I-10
- MS 977 - former designation for what is now the proposed MS 601
- MS 979 - former designation for what is now the proposed MS 615 south of I-10
- MS 981 - former designation for what is now MS 605 north of I-10
- MS 991 - former designation for what is now MS 619
- MS 993 - former designation for what is now MS 617
- MS 994 - former designation for what is now MS 618
