= Mississippi Highway 548 =

Highway in Mississippi

Mississippi Highway 548

Route information
- Maintained by MDOT
- Length: 5.097 mi (8.203 km)
- Existed: c. 1957–present

Major junctions
- West end: Old Highway 548 near Hermanville
- East end: Claiborne–Copiah county line near Conn

Location
- Country: United States
- State: Mississippi
- Counties: Claiborne

Highway system
- Mississippi State Highway System; Interstate; US; State
← MS 547	→ MS 550

Mississippi Highway 548 (MS 548) is a highway in western Mississippi. The route starts near Bruce Road, just east of Hermanville, and travels southeastward, before ending at the Claiborne–Copiah county line. It is not connected with the rest of the state highway system. The route was created around 1957, connecting from Mississippi Highway 18 to western Copiah County. The route was removed from maps in 1967, but was restored in 1998, with only a fraction of the route state maintained.

== Route description ==
The route runs inside Claiborne County, beginning at the start of state maintenance at Old Highway 548 just east of its intersection with Bruce Road. The starting point of the state highway is about four miles (6.4 km) east of Hermanville. The highway heads east, then turns southeastward and travelling through forest. At Shelby Road, it turns south at a T-intersection, then southeastward by farmland. It continues to the Claiborne–Copiah county line, where it ends. The road becomes Old Port Gibson Road after entering Copiah County. It never meets any other state highway.

In 2013, the Mississippi Department of Transportation (MDOT) calculated 220 vehicles per day travelled west of Shelby Road. The highway is not included as a part of the National Highway System (NHS). It is legally defined in Mississippi Code § 65-3-3, and is maintained by MDOT as part of the state highway system.

== History ==
MS 548 first appeared on maps in 1957, as a gravel road from Hermanville to a point northeast of Glancy. Four years later, it was extended onto a local gravel road to Mississippi Highway 28. The locally maintained section was paved by 1962. By 1967, the route was not included on the state highway map. It reappeared in 1998 as a short, paved route starting east of Hermanville to the county line.

== Major intersections ==
County	Location	mi	km	Destinations	Notes
Claiborne		0.000	0.000	Old Highway 548	
Claiborne–Copiah county line		5.097	8.203	Old Port Gibson Road	
1.000 mi = 1.609 km; 1.000 km = 0.621 mi
