= Mississippi Highway 510 =

Highway in Mississippi

Mississippi Highway 510
- MS 510 highlighted in pink

Route information
- Maintained by MDOT
- Length: 11.259 mi (18.120 km)
- Existed: c. 1957–present

Major junctions
- West end: MS 145 near Shubuta
- East end: Matherville–Frost Bridge Road near Matherville

Location
- Country: United States
- State: Mississippi
- Counties: Wayne, Clarke

Highway system
- Mississippi State Highway System; Interstate; US; State
← MS 508	→ MS 511

Mississippi Highway 510 (MS 510) is a state highway in eastern Mississippi. The route starts at MS 145 near Shubuta and travels eastward. The road turns southward near Matherville, and the route ends southeast of the unincorporated area. The road was constructed around 1957, and majority of the road was paved by 1967. A portion of the route east of Matherville was removed from the state highway system in 1999.

== Route description ==
Traffic volume on Mississippi Highway 510
Location	Volume
North of MS 145	810
South of CO 612	690
West of CO 611	630
North of L.B. Odom Drive	290
Data was measured in 2017 in terms of AADT; Source: Mississippi Department of Transportation

The route is located in northern Wayne and southern Clarke counties. MS 510 is legally defined in Mississippi Code § 65-3-3, and all of it is maintained by the Mississippi Department of Transportation (MDOT), as part of the Mississippi State Highway System.

MS 510 starts at a three-way junction with MS 145 south of Shubuta in Wayne County, and it travels northward towards the Wayne–Clarke county line. The road crosses the county line, and it turns east at County Road 612 (CO 612). The route enters a large area of farmland, and it crosses Carson Sand Creek. It curves northward until it reaches the Choctaw Base Line, where it begins travelling eastward again. Past CO 611, MS 510 crosses Dry Creek and Shiloh Creek. The road intersects CO 617, which leads to Langsdale. At CO 610, the route turns south towards the county line. MS 510 crosses the county line past CO 6101. The route turns southeast near L.B. Odom Drive in Matherville, and state maintenance ends southeast of the unincorporated area. The road continues as Matherville–Frost Bridge Road, which ends at U.S. Route 84 (US 84).

== History ==
Around 1957, a gravel road was constructed from US 45 near Shubuta to US 84 near Waynesboro, and it was designated as MS 510. The eastern terminus was rerouted closer to the Mississippi–Alabama state line by 1962. In January 1965, a project to grade and add culverts to the road began, costing $386,157.67 (equivalent to $3,853,014 in 2024). By 1967, the majority of the route was paved, with a small section remaining in gravel near US 84. A section of the route from the beginning of the gravel section to US 84 became locally maintained by 1998, and it was removed from the state highway system by 1999. By 2001, US 45 was rerouted to a new bypass around Shubuta, with MS 510 still connected to US 45's old alignment.

== Major intersections ==
County	Location	mi	km	Destinations	Notes
Wayne		0.000	0.000	MS 145 – De Soto, Waynesboro	Western terminus
Clarke	No major junctions				
Wayne		11.259	18.120	Matherville–Frost Bridge Road	Eastern terminus
1.000 mi = 1.609 km; 1.000 km = 0.621 mi
