= Mississippi Highway 547 =

State highway in Mississippi

Mississippi Highway 547

Route information
- Maintained by MDOT
- Length: 25.081 mi (40.364 km)
- Existed: 1950–present

Major junctions
- South end: MS 28 in Allen
- North end: US 61 in Port Gibson

Location
- Country: United States
- State: Mississippi
- Counties: Copiah, Claiborne

Highway system
- Mississippi State Highway System; Interstate; US; State
← MS 545	→ MS 548

Mississippi Highway 547 (MS 547) is a state highway in southwestern Mississippi. The highway runs about 25 miles (40 km) long on a southeast to northwest direction, signed as a north–south route. It connects MS 28 at Allen with Pattison and U.S. Route 61 (US 61) in southern Port Gibson.

== Route description ==
MS 547 begins at a four-way intersection with MS 28 and Ridgewood Lane in Allen, an unincorporated settlement in southwestern Copiah County. The two-lane state highway heads northwest through wooded lands (some of which officially part of Homochitto National Forest) with some open fields present along the road. After about six miles (9.7 km), the highway enters Claiborne County. Continuing generally on a west-northwesterly course, MS 547 passes through the settlements of Burnell and Peyton and crosses Clarks Creek on a small bridge.

The highway reaches the community of Pattison. Before passing through the center of Pattison, MS 547 makes a pair of 90-degree reverse curves. Through the center of it, the highway passes a few houses, a post office, and one convenience store. Heading out of Pattison, MS 547 continues northwest staying to the south of Little Bayou Pierre. The highway passes a small unnamed residential settlement at Tillman Road. Before entering Port Gibson, MS 547 passes under Natchez Trace Parkway without an interchange or intersection and the historic McGregor house. Upon entering the city limits, it assumes the name McComb Avenue. It heads through a mostly residential neighborhood but also provides access to Chamberlain-Hunt Academy and Claiborne County Medical Center. MS 547 ends at a stop-controlled intersection with US 61 (Church Street) in the southern reaches of the city.

== History ==
MS 547 was established in 1950 along the alignment it follows today. At the time of its formation, the road was only paved from Pattison to its northern terminus. The full length of the road was not paved until 1974. No major changes have occurred to the road or its alignment since then.

== Major intersections ==
County	Location	mi	km	Destinations	Notes
Copiah	Allen	0.000	0.000	MS 28 / Ridgewood Lane	Southern terminus
Claiborne	Port Gibson	25.081	40.364	US 61 (Church Street)	Northern terminus
1.000 mi = 1.609 km; 1.000 km = 0.621 mi
