= Mississippi Highway 552 =

State highway in Mississippi

Mississippi Highway 552

Route information
- Maintained by MDOT and Claiborne County
- Length: 30.467 mi (49.032 km)
- Existed: 1950–present

Western segment
- Length: 25.855 mi (41.610 km)
- West end: Rodney Westside Road near Westside
- Major intersections: Natchez Trace Parkway near Lorman; US 61 in Lorman
- East end: McBride Road in Blue Hill

Eastern segment
- Length: 4.612 mi (7.422 km)
- West end: McBride Road in McBride
- East end: MS 28 near Union Church

Location
- Country: United States
- State: Mississippi
- Counties: Claiborne, Jefferson

Highway system
- Mississippi State Highway System; Interstate; US; State
← MS 550	→ MS 553

Mississippi Highway 552 (MS 552) is a state highway in the U.S. state of Mississippi that travels through Claiborne and Jefferson counties. The highway, consisting of two segments connected via McBride Road, connects Alcorn State University with Lorman, Natchez Trace Parkway and U.S. Route 61 (US 61) and other small communities in northern Jefferson County.

== Route description ==
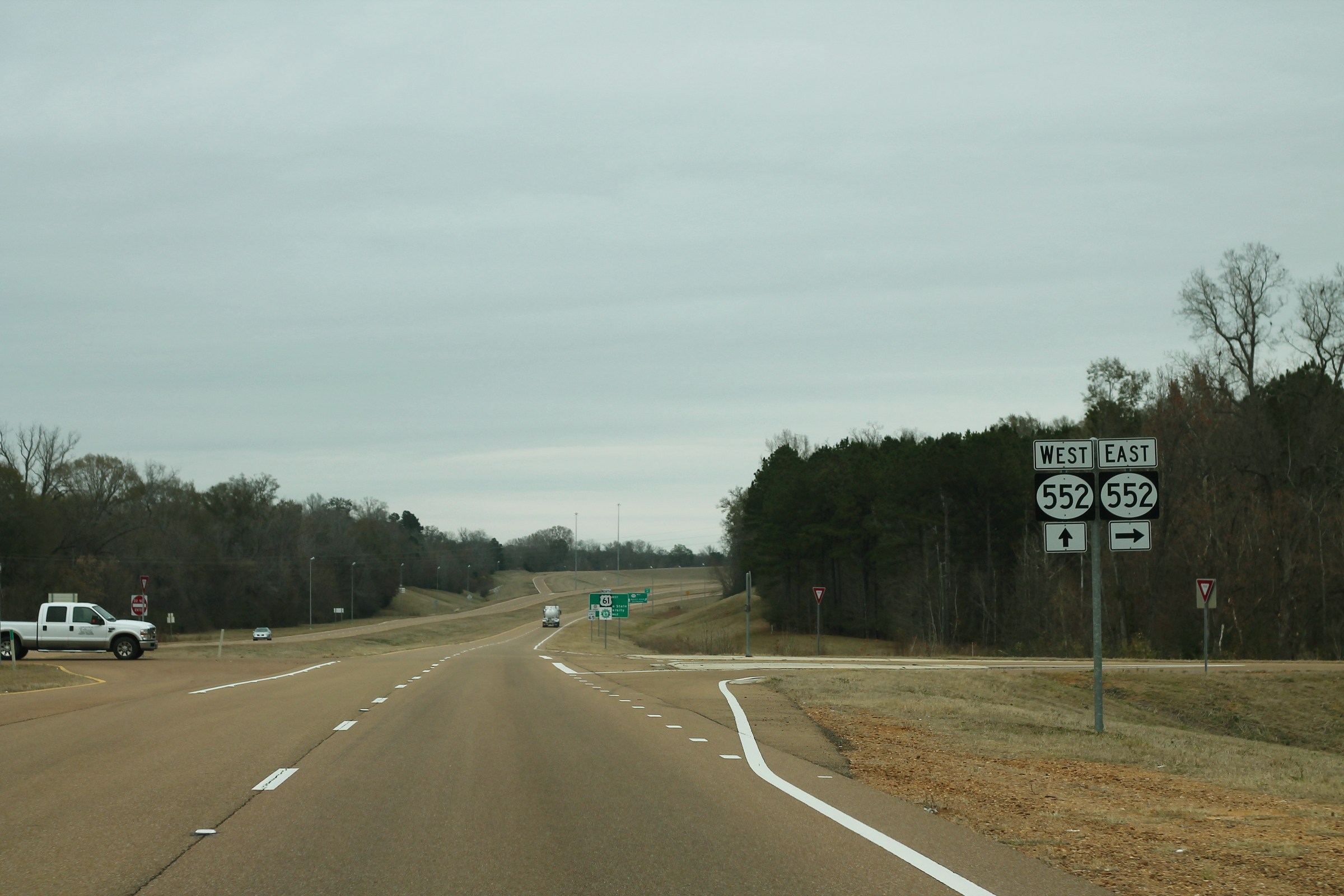
Northbound US 61 at the southern intersection with MS 552; the northern interchange where MS 552 breaks off is in the far background

The official beginning of MS 552 is at the unimproved Rodney Westisde Road in rural Claiborne County. The unimproved road west of here, formerly part of MS 552, leads to an abandoned ferry landing on the banks of the Mississippi River. The two-lane road heads northeast to an intersection with Rodney Road. At this point, state maintenance of the highway begins and MS 552 eastbound makes a sharp turn to the south. Signage of the road as MS 552 also begins at this point. The road heads south through the community of Westside before heading onto a bypass road around the east side of Alcorn State University. Two access roads at the north and south sides of the campus provide a direct route into the campus and are the former routing of MS 552. At this southern access road, the MS 552 mainline turns to the southeast at a T-intersection and widens to a four-lane highway. The road soon enters Jefferson County and continues southeast. It passes an interchange with the Natchez Trace Parkway, the old routing of US 61, and then an interchange with the current US 61. The interchange is a half diamond interchange (on the US 61 southbound side) and half trumpet interchange (northbound side). Here, MS 552 heads south along US 61 forming a concurrency. The four-lane divided highway enters the community of Lorman and MS 552 soon turns off US 61 to head east on an undivided two-lane road.

MS 552 heads through wooded terrain on a southeasterly course. It passes in front of the Rosswood Plantation, then through the community of Red Lick which is generally a collection of small houses around the area's main intersection. Continuing southeast, it reaches a four-way intersection known as Dennis Crossroads. MS 552 turns to the northeast. At a small clearing, the road bends to the southeast. In a wooded area in front of Blue Hill Church (around the community of Blue Hill), state maintenance of the road ends as does the official state designation. The road continues as McBride Road, crosses Clarks Creek, and becomes a dirt road. About five miles (8.0 km) to the east, in the community of McBride, MS 552 resumes again in front of a church. Pavement and two marked lanes resume at this point as well. The road briefly heads northeast before curving to the southeast. The road heads through McBride then crosses into a narrow reach of Homochitto National Forest. At a junction with MS 28, in front of a small grocery store, MS 552 ends, just 65 feet (20 m) shy of the Copiah County border.

== History ==
A portion of what is currently MS 552 had existed since 1932- a loop from US 61 from Lorman to Port Gibson providing access to Alcorn College and Windsor Ruins. The portion in Jefferson County was paved between 1946 and 1948 and was assigned the number MS 552 in 1950. An extension of the highway was made in 1956 with the designation of MS 552 east of US 61 along a paved road to Dennis Crossroads (at an intersection later which later included MS 553) and an unimproved road to MS 28. Also after 1956, the portion of MS 552 north of Westside to Port Gibson was downgraded to a county road. The gap in the paved road along McBride Road had never been paved and it is unknown when it was formally dropped from the state highway system.

MS 552 made a slight extension to the west when a new ferry connecting to St. Joseph, Louisiana was opened in March 1963. The ferry shut down in March 1979 due to increasing costs and low ridership. However, the highway was not truncated to its current western terminus until the mid-1990s. Also, in August 1998, the portion of the road between US 61 and Alcorn State University was expanded to four lanes in width with the road being officially renamed Alcorn Parkway. The divided portion of MS 552 concurrent with US 61 alongside the interchange at the north end of the concurrency opened around 2005.

== Major intersections ==
County	Location	mi	km	Destinations	Notes
Claiborne		0.000	0.000	Rodney Westside Road	Western terminus
Jefferson		9.328– 9.545	15.012– 15.361	Natchez Trace Parkway – Natchez, Jackson	Double quadrant roadway intersection
Jefferson		10.450– 10.875	16.818– 17.502	US 61 north / Great River Road – Port Gibson	Trumpet interchange, western end of US 61 concurrency
Jefferson	Lorman	11.467	18.454	US 61 south / Great River Road / Rodney Road – Fayette, Natchez	Eastern end of US 61 concurrency
Jefferson	Blue Hill	25.855	41.610	McBride Road	Eastern terminus of western segment
Jefferson	Gap in route				
Jefferson	McBride	25.855	41.610	McBride Road	Western terminus of eastern segment
Jefferson		30.467	49.032	MS 28 / St. Paul Road	Eastern terminus
1.000 mi = 1.609 km; 1.000 km = 0.621 mi: Concurrency terminus
