= Mississippi Highway 617 =

State Highway in Mississippi

Mississippi Highway 617
- Plymouth Street; Jerry St. Pe' Highway

Route information
- Maintained by MDOT
- Length: 1.529 mi (2.461 km)
- Existed: July 1, 2002–present
- History: Road constructed c. 1973

Major junctions
- South end: Port of Pascagoula
- North end: US 90 in Pascagoula

Location
- Country: United States
- State: Mississippi
- Counties: Jackson

Highway system
- Mississippi State Highway System; Interstate; US; State
← MS 615	→ MS 618

Mississippi Highway 617 (MS 617) is a short unsigned state highway in southern Mississippi. Its southern terminus is in the Port of Pascagoula. The route then travels north for nearly two mi (3.2 km) and ends at U.S. Route 90 (US 90). The road was constructed in 1973, and an interchange was added at US 90 around 1993. MS 617 was designated on July 1, 2002, and no significant changes were made since.

== Route description ==
All of the divided highway is located in Pascagoula, Jackson County. MS 617 starts near parking lots in an industry area inside the Port of Pascagoula. The route, known as Plymouth Street, travels north past an unnamed street. Soon, it intersects MS 619, a causeway to Singing River Island. MS 617 then crosses a bridge over a CSX railroad. Immediately after that, the road meets US 90 at a trumpet interchange, reaching its northern terminus.

In 2013, Mississippi Department of Transportation (MDOT) calculated as many as 20,000 vehicles traveling north of MS 619, and as few as 6,400 vehicles traveling north of US 90. MS 617 is not included as a part of the National Highway System (NHS), a network of highways identified as being most important for the economy, mobility and defense of the nation. The route is legally defined in Mississippi Code § 65-3-3, and is maintained by MDOT. MS 617 is also designated as Jerry St. Pe' Highway.

== History ==
Mississippi Highway 993
- Location: Pascagoula
- Existed: 1993–2002

A road was built between 1971 and 1973, extending from the port to US 90. It was removed from the maps in 1984, and was added back in 1993–94 as Mississippi Highway 993 (MS 993), with a new interchange at US 90. On July 1, 2002, the Mississippi Legislature designated the route MS 617, and named it as "Jerry St. Pe' Highway". The route has not changed significantly since.

== Major intersections ==
The entire route is in Pascagoula, Jackson County.

mi	km	Destinations	Notes
0.000	0.000	Port of Pascagoula	Southern terminus
0.567	0.912	MS 619 south (USS Vicksburg Way)	Northern terminus of MS 619
1.075– 1.529	1.730– 2.461	US 90 (Denny Avenue) – Gautier, Downtown	Trumpet interchange; northern terminus
1.000 mi = 1.609 km; 1.000 km = 0.621 mi
