= Mississippi Highway 619 =

State Highway in Mississippi

Mississippi Highway 619
- USS Vicksburg Way

Route information
- Maintained by MDOT
- Length: 2.816 mi (4.532 km)
- Existed: 1989–present

Major junctions
- South end: Main gate of former Naval Station Pascagoula
- North end: MS 617 in Pascagoula

Location
- Country: United States
- State: Mississippi
- Counties: Jackson

Highway system
- Mississippi State Highway System; Interstate; US; State
| ← MS 618 | → MS 621 |

Mississippi Highway 619 (MS 619), also known as USS Vicksburg Way, is a 2.8-mile-long (4.5 km) north–south unsigned state highway in Jackson County in the Mississippi Gulf Coast region of Mississippi. It connects the site of the former Naval Station Pascagoula (now Coast Guard Station Pascagoula) with both the Port of Pascagoula and the city of Pascagoula. MS 619 is the only road access to Singing River Island.

== Route description ==
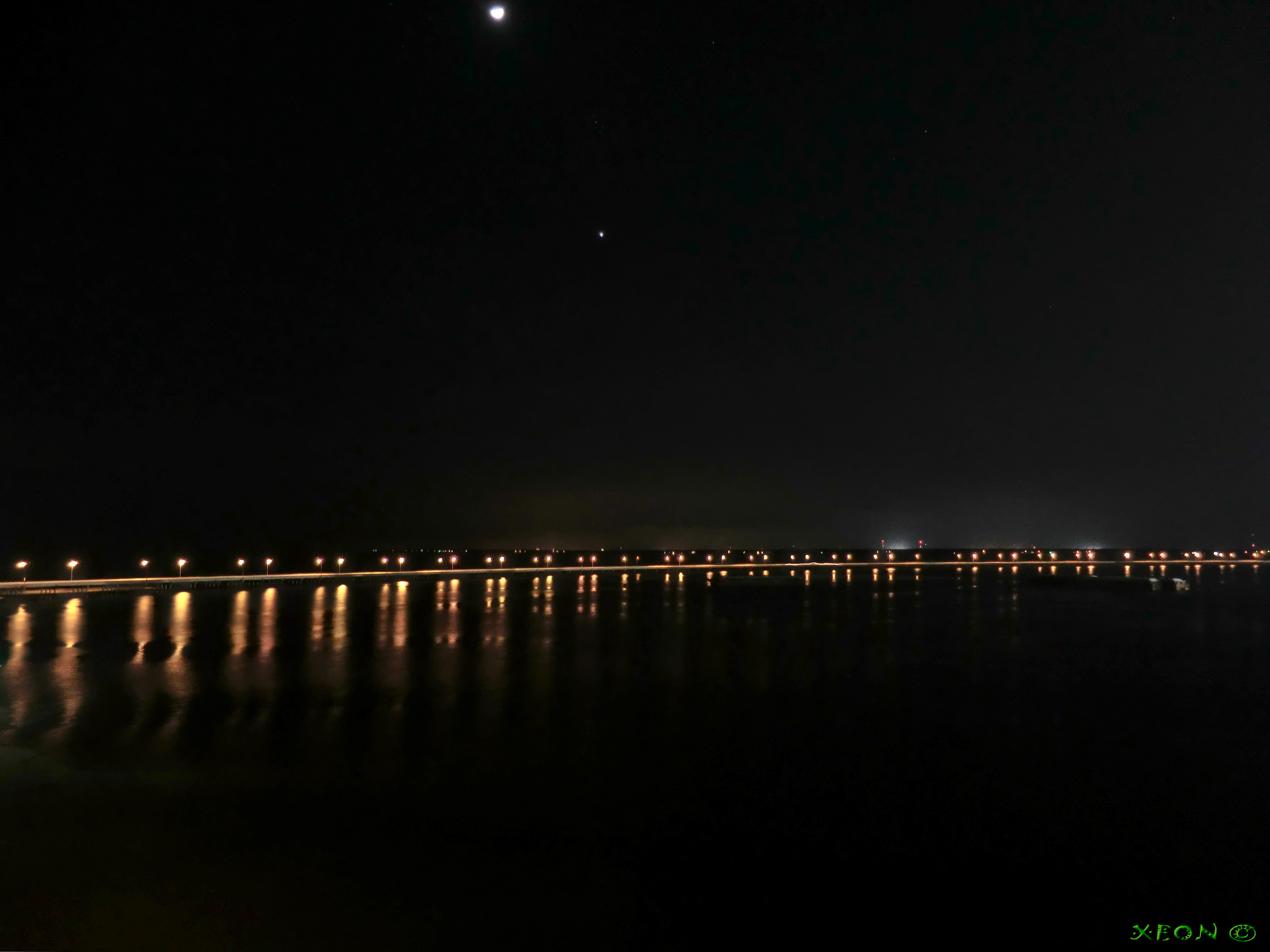
View of the Mississippi Highway 619 bridge at night

MS 619 begins on Singing River Island at the main gate of the former Naval Station Pascagoula (now Coast Guard Station Pascagoula). It heads west for a couple hundred feet before crossing a nearly 2.6-mile-long (4.2 km) bridge over Pascagoula Bay, which first curves northward for the majority of the span before curving eastward. The highway now crosses onto the mainland for only a 0.1 miles (0.16 km) before coming to an end at an intersection with MS 617 (Jerry St. Pé Highway) at the northern end of the Port of Pascagoula.

The entire length of Mississippi Highway 619 is a two-lane highway, with a 55-mile-per-hour (89 km/h) speed limit.

== History ==
MS 619 was originally opened in 1989, coinciding with the completion of the new Naval Station Pascagoula. The route was signed as USS Vicksburg Way in April 1993. While the base closed in 2006 (though has been converted to Coast Guard Station Pascagoula), the highway still exists and is open to traffic, serving as the only road access to Singing River Island.

== Major intersections ==
The entire route is in Jackson County.

| Location | mi | km | Destinations | Notes |
|---|---|---|---|---|
| Singing River Island | 0.000 | 0.000 | Main gate of former Naval Station Pascagoula | Southern terminus; south end of state maintenance |
| Pascagoula | 2.816 | 4.532 | MS 617 (Jerry St. Pé Highway) | Northern terminus |
1.000 mi = 1.609 km; 1.000 km = 0.621 mi
