= Mississippi Highway 618 =

State Highway in Mississippi

Mississippi Highway 618

Route information
- Maintained by MDOT
- Length: 4.910 mi (7.902 km)

Major junctions
- West end: MS 613 in Moss Point
- MS 63 in Moss Point
- East end: US 90 in Orange Grove

Location
- Country: United States
- State: Mississippi
- Counties: Jackson

Highway system
- Mississippi State Highway System; Interstate; US; State
← MS 617	→ MS 619

Mississippi Highway 618 (MS 618) is a 4.91-mile-long (7.90 km) unsigned east-west state highway in Jackson County in the Mississippi Gulf Coast region of Mississippi. It connects the city of Moss Point to the community of Orange Grove.

== Route description ==
MS 618 begins in downtown Moss Point at an intersection with MS 613 (Main Street). It heads east along McInnis Avenue to cross a railroad track to leave downtown and travel through neighborhoods for several blocks as it begins paralleling the Escatawpa River, where it merges onto Elder Street, then Grierson Street. The highway has an intersection with MS 63 and heads northeast through more neighborhoods, passing by a few businesses and crosses a small bayou, before leaving Moss Point. MS 618 curves back to the east and enters the small community of Orange Grove, where it merges onto Old Stage Road for a short distance before making a sharp right turn and coming to an end at an intersection with US Highway 90 (US 90). Old Stage Road continues northeast along the original two-lane alignment of US 90.

The entire length of Mississippi Highway 618 is an unsigned two-lane state highway.

== History ==
Mississippi Highway 994
- Location: Moss Point - Orange Grove
- Length: 4.910 mi (7.902 km)
- Existed: yes

MS 618 was originally designated as Mississippi Highway 994 (MS 994).

== Major intersections ==
The entire route is in Jackson County.

Location	mi	km	Destinations	Notes
Moss Point	0.000	0.000	MS 613 (Main Street)	Western terminus
Moss Point	1.958	3.151	MS 63	
Orange Grove	4.910	7.902	US 90	Eastern terminus
1.000 mi = 1.609 km; 1.000 km = 0.621 mi
