= Mississippi Highway 886 =

Highway in Mississippi

Mississippi Highway 886

Route information
- Maintained by MDOT
- Length: 1.0 mi (1.6 km)

Major junctions
- West end: I-55 / Old Agency Road in Ridgeland
- East end: US 51 / Jackson Street in Ridgeland

Location
- Country: United States
- State: Mississippi
- Counties: Madison

Highway system
- Mississippi State Highway System; Interstate; US; State
← MS 885	→ MS 888

Mississippi Highway 886 (MS 886) is a highway in Central Mississippi. The western terminus is at Interstate 55 (I-55) and Old Agency Road in Ridgeland, and the eastern terminus is at US Highway 51 (US 51) in Ridgeland.

== Route description ==
MS 886's western terminus is I-55 and Old Agency Road in Ridgeland. Then it travels east through Downtown Ridgeland, and the eastern terminus is at US 51 in downtown.

== Major intersections ==
The entire route is in Ridgeland, Madison County.

mi	km	Destinations	Notes
0.0	0.0	I-55 / Old Agency Road – Grenada, Jackson	Western terminus
1.0	1.6	US 51 / Jackson Street	Eastern terminus
1.000 mi = 1.609 km; 1.000 km = 0.621 mi
