= Mississippi Highway 37 =

Highway in Mississippi

Mississippi Highway 37
- MS 37 highlighted in red

Route information
- Maintained by MDOT
- Length: 24.586 mi (39.567 km)
- Existed: c. 1950–present

Major junctions
- South end: US 84 near Collins
- MS 28 in Taylorsville
- North end: MS 35 in Raleigh

Location
- Country: United States
- State: Mississippi
- Counties: Covington, Smith

Highway system
- Mississippi State Highway System; Interstate; US; State
← MS 35	→ MS 39

Mississippi Highway 37 (MS 37) is a state highway in central Mississippi. The route starts at U.S. Route 84 (US 84) near Collins. The road travels northward through the town of Taylorsville, crossing from Covington County to Smith County. MS 37 turns northwestward and ends at MS 35 in Raleigh. The road first existed as part of MS 35, and it became a spur route of MS 35 by 1941. It was renumbered as MS 37 by 1950, and fully paved by 1952.

== Route description ==
Traffic volume on Mississippi Highway 37
Location	Volume
North of Mitchell Rogers Road	1,900
South of New Hopewell Church Road	2,600
South of Moore Street	3,200
North of Magnolia Drive	1,200
North of CO 90	1,400
Data was measured in 2017 in terms of AADT; Source: Mississippi Department of Transportation

The route is located in northeastern Covington and southern Smith counties. MS 37 is legally defined in Mississippi Code § 65-3-3, and all of it is maintained by the Mississippi Department of Transportation (MDOT), as part of the Mississippi State Highway System.

MS 37 starts at the three-way junction with US 84 east of Collins in Covington County, and it travels northward through a forested area. The road turns northeastward at Hopewell School Road before traveling north past S.B. Barnes Lane. It intersects MS 532 in the unincorporated area of Hot Coffee, and it crosses Oakohay Creek north of Calhoun Church Road. The road enters Smith County after intersecting Drive-In Lane. MS 37 intersects County Road 19 (CO 19) and crosses Lyon Creek. South of Old Gilmer Road, the route enters the city limits of Taylorsville. MS 37, known as Pine Street inside the town, travels north through the residential area and intersects MS 28 at Mayfield Street and Comfort Street. Pine Street ends at its intersection with MS 28, and MS 37 continues northward along Welcome Street. The route turns northwestward at Magnolia Drive and leaves the city limits. The road re-enters the forest, and crosses Fisher Creek near CO 72. MS 37 turns north at CO 89, and intersects CO 80-W at Center Ridge. The route then turns westward at CO 37-3 and enters the city limits of Raleigh. MS 37 ends at MS 35, and the road continues as CO 77.

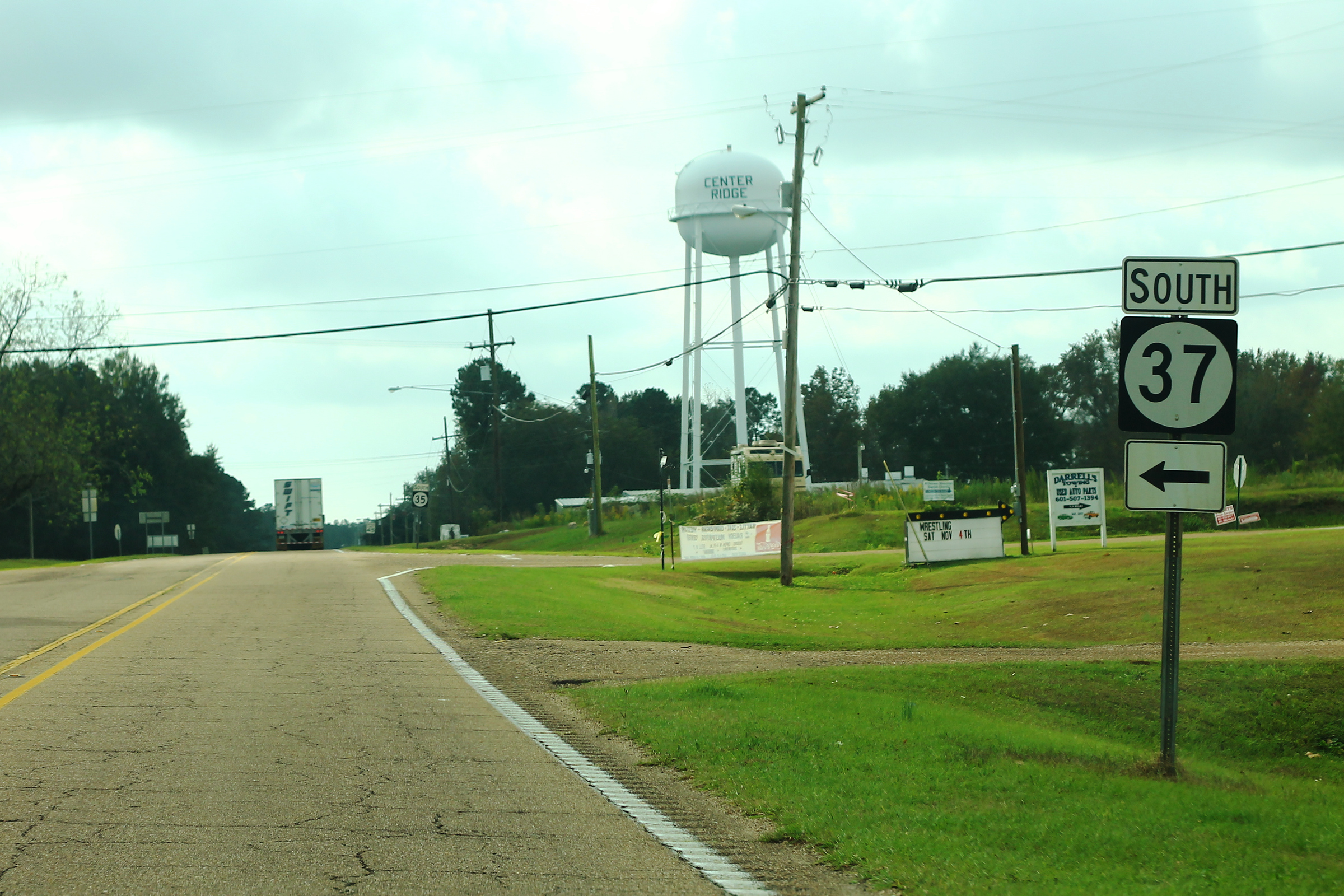
Mississippi Highway 37 at its northern terminus at MS 35 in Raleigh

== History ==
Mississippi Highway 35E
- Location: Collins - Raleigh
- Existed: 1941–1950

A road has existed from Collins to Raleigh since 1928, with gravel layered between Collins and Taylorsville. All of the road was layered with gravel by 1932, and it became part of MS 35. By 1941, the road was renumbered to MS 35E, as a new road from Mount Olive to Raleigh was designated as MS 35W. MS 35E was also realigned onto a paved road that started at US 84 east of Collins, transitioning to a gravel road at Taylorsville. Around nine years later, MS 35E was renumbered to MS 37, and MS 35W became part of MS 35. The section of the route near Raleigh was paved by 1951, and the remaining section near Taylorsville was paved by July 1952.

== Major intersections ==
County	Location	mi	km	Destinations	Notes
Covington		0.0	0.0	US 84 – Laurel, Collins	Southern terminus
Covington		4.0	6.4	MS 532 – Hot Coffee, Mount Olive	
Smith	Taylorsville	10.5	16.9	MS 28 east – Laurel	Southern end of MS 28 concurrency
Smith	Taylorsville	10.7	17.2	MS 28 west – Mize	Northern end of MS 28 concurrency
Smith	Raleigh	24.6	39.6	MS 35 – Mize, Raleigh	Northern terminus
1.000 mi = 1.609 km; 1.000 km = 0.621 mi: Concurrency terminus
