= Mississippi Highway 550 =

State highway in Mississippi

Mississippi Highway 550

Route information
- Maintained by MDOT
- Length: 23.144 mi (37.247 km)
- Existed: 1950–present

Major junctions
- West end: MS 28 in Union Church
- US 51 in Brookhaven
- East end: MS 184 in Brookhaven

Location
- Country: United States
- State: Mississippi
- Counties: Jefferson, Lincoln

Highway system
- Mississippi State Highway System; Interstate; US; State
← MS 548	→ MS 552

Mississippi Highway 550 (MS 550) is a 23-mile-long (37 km) state highway connecting Union Church and Brookhaven in southern Mississippi. The road travels through Jefferson and Lincoln counties.

== Route description ==
MS 550 begins at a Y-intersection with MS 28 in the community of Union Church, Jefferson County. The two-lane road heads southeast and later east through woodlands. The road crosses into Homochitto National Forest, enters Lincoln County, and crosses the Homochitto River. MS 550 winds through the national forest and reaches the settlement of Caseyville before formally exiting the forest's boundary. Continuing southeast, the road passes through more open fields, reaching the unincorporated community of Loyd Star (formerly known as Redstar) and the attendance center (school) of the same name. As MS 550 approaches Brookhaven, it passes under Interstate 55 (I-55) without an interchange. It enters the city at the I-55 overpass. Passing a rehabilitation center and some businesses, it reaches an intersection with U.S. Route 51 (US 51) where a railroad bisects the intersection. Heading into the city center, the highway carries the names Union Church Road, Congress Street, and Schwem Avenue. The road ends at an intersection with West Monticello Street and Turnbough Avenue; the former carries MS 184 east of here.

== History ==
A state maintained gravel road had existed connecting Union Church and Brookhaven since at least 1928. Some improvements were made to the road from this time to 1950 when it had formally received the MS 550 designation. By 1953, the entire route had been fully asphalt paved.

== Major intersections ==
County	Location	mi	km	Destinations	Notes
Jefferson	Union Church	0.000	0.000	MS 28 – Fayette, Hazlehurst	Western terminus
Lincoln	Brookhaven	22.569	36.321	US 51	
Lincoln	Brookhaven	23.144	37.247	MS 184 east (West Monticello Street) / Turnbough Avenue	Eastern terminus; western terminus of MS 184 segment
1.000 mi = 1.609 km; 1.000 km = 0.621 mi
