= Mississippi Highway 531 =

Highway in Mississippi

Mississippi Highway 531
- MS 531 highlighted in red

Route information
- Maintained by MDOT
- Length: 12.114 mi (19.496 km)
- Existed: 1956–present

Major junctions
- South end: MS 28 near Taylorsville
- North end: MS 18 in Bay Springs

Location
- Country: United States
- State: Mississippi
- Counties: Smith, Jasper

Highway system
- Mississippi State Highway System; Interstate; US; State
← MS 529	→ MS 532

Mississippi Highway 531 (MS 531) is a state highway in central Mississippi. The road starts at MS 28 near Taylorsville and travels northeastward. It crosses from Smith County to Jasper County, and ends at MS 18 in the town of Bay Springs. The route was designated in 1956 along its current alignment, and it was paved by 1960.

== Route description ==
All of MS 531 is located in Smith and Jasper counties. The route is legally defined in Mississippi Code § 65-3-3, and is maintained by the Mississippi Department of Transportation as part of the state highway system. The section in Smith County was designated as Staff Sergeant Mark Haskin Eaton Memorial Highway in 2011, commemorating a member of the Army Special Forces killed in the Vietnam War. Around 2,100 vehicles use the highway on average each day.

The highway starts at its T-intersection with MS 28, east of the town of Taylorsville. The road travels northward through the forest and turns northeastward at County Road 10-B (CO 10-B). It travels to the intersection of CO 15 and CO 33, passing by the unincorporated area of Old Taylorsville. MS 531 then continues northeastward to CO 99, where it shifts eastward slightly. The route crosses the county line into Jasper County, and it soon enters the corporation limits of Bay Springs. The road ends at MS 18 in a T-intersection past CO 9.

== History ==
MS 531 was designated in 1956 to a gravel road from MS 20 near Taylorsville to MS 18 near Bay Springs. The route was paved by 1960, and MS 20 was renumbered to MS 28. The highway has not changed significantly since.

== Major intersections ==
County	Location	mi	km	Destinations	Notes
Smith		0.000	0.000	MS 28 – Laurel, Taylorsville	Southern terminus
Jasper	Bay Springs	12.114	19.496	MS 18 – Raleigh, Bay Springs	Northern terminus
1.000 mi = 1.609 km; 1.000 km = 0.621 mi
