= Mississippi Highway 28 =

Highway in Mississippi

Mississippi Highway 28

Route information
- Maintained by MDOT
- Length: 124.601 mi (200.526 km)
- Existed: 1960–present

Major junctions
- West end: US 61 / MS 33 in Fayette
- I-55 in Hazlehurst; US 51 in Hazlehurst; US 49 in Magee; MS 35 in Mize; MS 37 in Taylorsville
- East end: US 84 in Calhoun

Location
- Country: United States
- State: Mississippi
- Counties: Jefferson, Copiah, Simpson, Smith, Jones

Highway system
- Mississippi State Highway System; Interstate; US; State
← MS 27	→ MS 29

Mississippi Highway 28 (MS 28) is a state highway in south-central Mississippi, United States, that runs east–west from U.S. Highway 84 (US 84) west of Laurel to US 61/MS 33 in Fayette. It travels approximately 126 miles (203 km), serving Jefferson, Copiah, Simpson, Smith, and Jones counties.

MS 28 is a largely two-lane, paved road that travels east and west across central Mississippi. The route does have several dangerous intersections and sharp curves, the most notable being the intersection with MS 37 in Taylorsville and the intersection with MS 35 in Mize. The road is heavily traveled, and is a major corridor from Laurel to Jackson. The road does share a four-lane concurrency with US 49 for about two miles (3.2 km) in the city of Magee before turning south.

== Route description ==
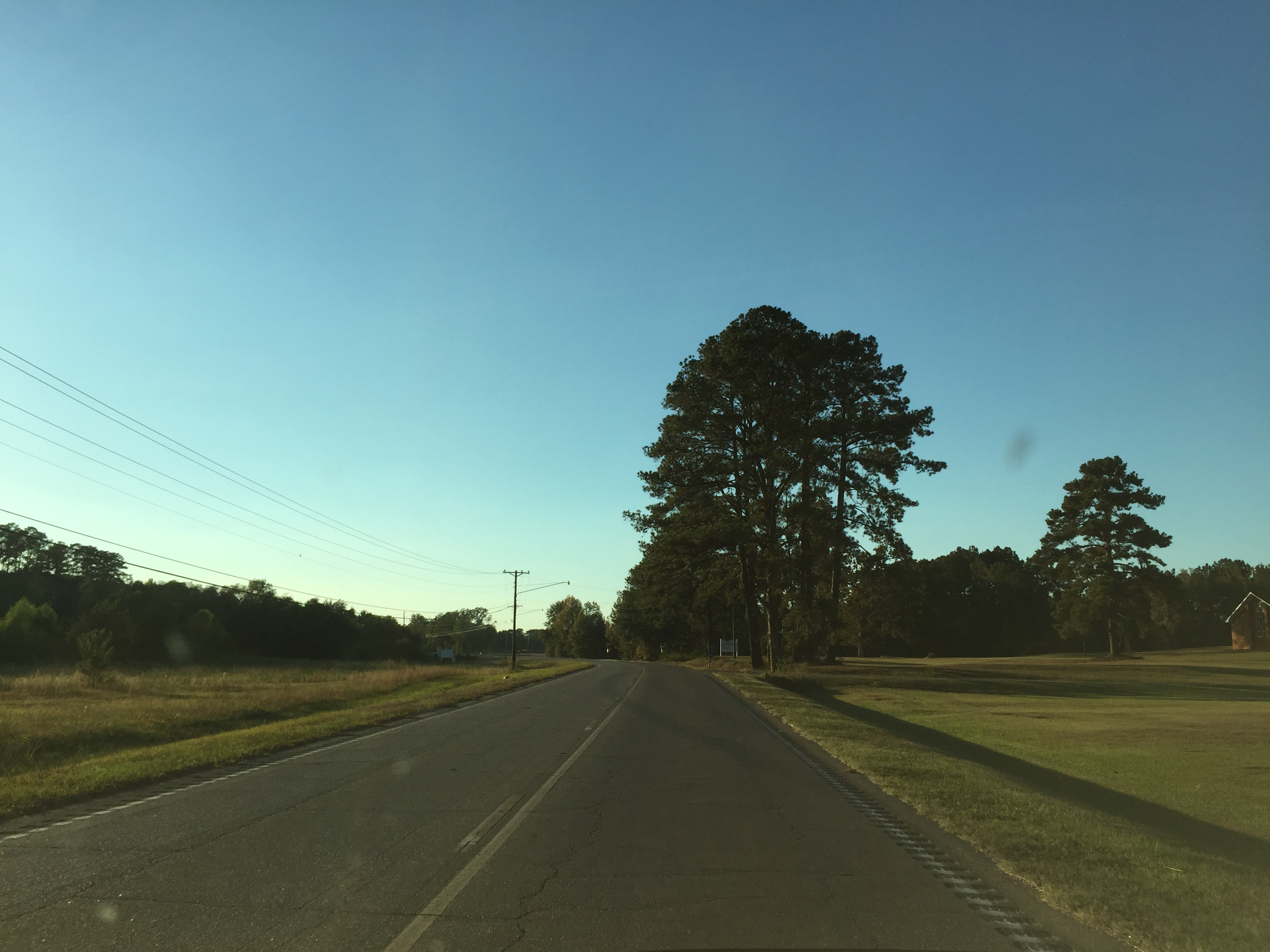
MS 28 outside of Taylorsville as it tracks west towards Magee

Both MS 28 and MS 33 begin in Jefferson County at an intersection with US 61 in Fayette, located at an intersection in a business district just west of downtown. They head south as a two-lane highway through the business district to junction with Main Street (Old US 61) before passing through neighborhoods, where MS 28 splits off and heads east. MS 28 leaves Fayette shortly thereafter and begins traveling through rural woodlands for several miles, where it has an intersection with Medgar Exers Boulevard (Old MS 28 through downtown Fayette), and passes through Union Church, where it has an intersection with MS 550. The highway then crosses into Copiah County at an intersection with MS 552 in the community of Pleasant Hill.

MS 28 has an intersection with MS 547 at Allen as it travels through a mix of farmland and wooded areas for several miles (passing through the community of Gallatin) to enter Hazlehurst at an interchange with I-55 (Exit 61), where it widens to a four-lane divided highway. The highway narrows to a undivided four lane as it bypasses downtown along its north side, passing near Lake Hazle, where it has an intersection with US 51 (Caldwell Drive) before narrowing down to two-lanes and passing through neighborhoods for several blocks. MS 28 now leaves the Hazlehurst city limits to have an intersection with E Whitworth Street (Old MS 28; connector to the western section of MS 472) before traveling through a mix of rural farmland and wooded areas for several miles, where it both crosses and follows Copiah Creek into Georgetown. At Georgetown, the highway has an intersection with MS 27 before crossing the Pearl River into Simpson County.

MS 28 heads east through farmland for several miles to have an intersection with MS 469, and crosses the Strong River, before passing through Pinola, where it has a short concurrency (overlap) with MS 43, as well as having a junction with the eastern section of MS 472. The highway takes a southeastern turn for several miles, where it has an intersection with MS 13, before heading back northeast for a few miles to enter the Magee outskirts at an intersection with MS 545. It becomes concurrent with MS 541 and they enter the city limits proper just shortly before becoming concurrent with US 49. They head southeast through a business district as a four-lane divided highway, where MS 541 splits off into downtown along Main Avenue S, before MS 28 splits off as a two-lane along Pinola Drive. MS 28 has a short concurrency with MS 149 (Simpson Highway 149) through some neighborhoods on the southern outskirts of downtown before MS 28 leaves Magee heads eastward through rural farmland for the next several miles to cross into Smith County.

MS 28 travels just to the south of Shady Grove for a few miles before passing through the town of Mize, where the road crosses Oakohay Creek and shares a concurrency with MS 35 (Oak Street) for a little over a mile. The highway passes through more wooded areas for a few miles to travel through Wisner before entering the Taylorsville city limits and traveling through an industrial area. MS 28 now passes straight through the center of downtown along Mayfield Street and Front Street, where it has an extremely short (and quite dangerous) concurrency with MS 37 (Welcome Street/Pine Street). MS 28 leaves Taylorsville after passing through neighborhoods to cross the Leaf River and have an intersection with MS 531 before entering Jones County at the community of Summerland.

MS 28 turns southeast through a mix of farmland and woodlands for several miles to travel through the community of Gitano, where it has an intersection with MS 529, and the town of Soso, where it has intersections with both MS 533 and MS 29. The highway passes through more farmland before coming to an end at an intersection with US 84 in Calhoun, a small community on the western outskirts of Laurel.

== History ==
Mississippi Highway 20
- Location: Fayette–Calhoun
- Existed: 1932–1960

What is now MS 28 originated back in 1932 as Mississippi Highway 20 (MS 20), but it was renumbered to 28 in 1960 to avoid confusion with soon to be built I-20, with some sections of that highway beginning construction in 1960.

== Future ==
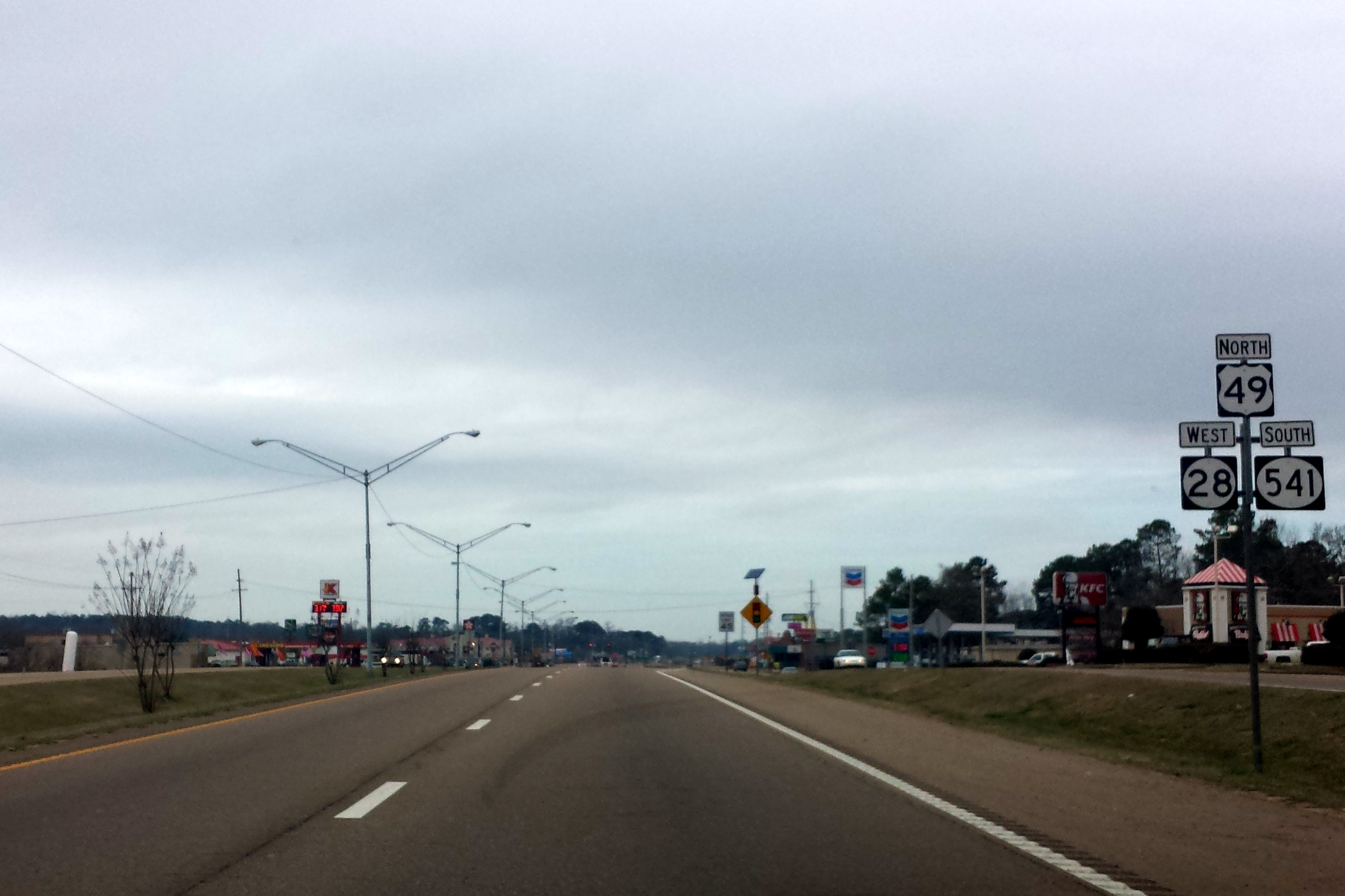
MS 28 and MS 541 briefly overlap with US 49 in Magee

There have been some discussions among residents in communities along MS 28 concerning plans to completely four-lane MS 28 from its terminus with US 84 in Laurel to US 49 in Magee. The route already shares a two-mile-long (3.2 km) concurrency with US 49 in Magee, and some residents feel that a four-lane highway would better alleviate heavy truck traffic.

There have been no official plans from the Mississippi Department of Transportation (MDOT) to upgrade MS 28 to freeway standards. Residents opposed to the potential change claim that "four-laning" the Highway would also entail bypasses for several small towns along the route, stifling business opportunities.

However, MDOT does have some improvements scheduled for the dangerous intersection with MS 37 in Taylorsville. A $3,000,000 project for "various intersection improvements at MS 37/MS 28" is set to begin in 2018.

== Major intersections ==
County	Location	mi	km	Destinations	Notes
Jefferson	Fayette	0.0	0.0	US 61 – Natchez, Port Gibson MS 33 begins	Western terminus; northern terminus of MS 33; western end of MS 33 concurrency
Jefferson	Fayette	0.2	0.32	Main Street - Downtown Fayette	Old US 61
Jefferson	Fayette	0.9	1.4	MS 33 south – Roxie	Eastern end of MS 33 concurrency
Jefferson		3.2	5.1	Medgar Evers Boulevard - Fayette	Former MS 28
Jefferson	Union Church	18.9	30.4	MS 550 east – Brookhaven	Western terminus of MS 550
Copiah	Pleasant Hill	23.2	37.3	MS 552 west	Eastern terminus of MS 552
Copiah	Allen	28.2	45.4	MS 547 north – Pattison, Port Gibson	Southern terminus of MS 547
Copiah	Gallatin	43.9	70.7	Old Port Gibson Road - Hood Scout Reservation (Boy Scout Camp)	
Copiah		44.8	72.1	W Whitworth Street - Downtown Hazlehurst	Old MS 28
Copiah	Hazlehurst	46.4– 46.6	74.7– 75.0	I-55 – Jackson, Brookhaven	I-55 exit 61
Copiah	Hazlehurst	47.2	76.0	US 51 (Caldwell Drive) – Crystal Springs, Hazlehurst	
Copiah		50.7	81.6	E Whitworth Street to MS 472 – Hazlehurst	Former MS 28; connector to western terminus of western segment of MS 472
Copiah	Georgetown	61.5	99.0	MS 27 – Crystal Springs, Monticello	
Simpson	Union	67.1	108.0	MS 469 north – Harrisville	Southern terminus of MS 469
Simpson	Pinola	74.1	119.3	MS 43 north – Mendenhall	Western end of MS 43 concurrency
Simpson		74.9	120.5	MS 472 west	Eastern terminus of eastern section of MS 472
Simpson		75.5	121.5	MS 43 south – New Hebron	Eastern end of MS 43 concurrency
Simpson		80.5	129.6	MS 13 – Mendenhall, Prentiss	
Simpson		87.4	140.7	MS 545 north	Southern terminus of MS 545
Simpson		88.1	141.8	MS 541 south	Western end of MS 541 concurrency
Simpson	Magee	89.7	144.4	US 49 north – Jackson	Western end of US 49 concurrency
Simpson	Magee	90.1	145.0	MS 541 north (Main Avenue South) – Downtown Magee	Eastern end of MS 541 concurrency
Simpson	Magee	90.3	145.3	US 49 south – Hattiesburg	Eastern end of US 49 concurrency
Simpson	Magee	90.6	145.8	MS 149 south (Simpson Highway 149) – Hattiesburg	Western end of MS 149 concurrency
Simpson	Magee	90.9	146.3	MS 149 north (Simpson Highway 149)	Eastern end of MS 149 overlap
Smith		96.2	154.8	SC Road 503 - Shady Grove	
Smith	Mize	101.6	163.5	MS 35 south (Oak Street) – Mount Olive	Western end of MS 35 concurrency
Smith		102.9	165.6	MS 35 north – Raleigh	Eastern end of MS 35 concurrency
Smith	Taylorsville	109.5	176.2	MS 37 north (Welcome Street) – Raleigh	Northern end of MS 37 concurrency
Smith	Taylorsville	109.6	176.4	MS 37 south (Pine Street) – Collins	Southern end of MS 37 concurrency
Smith		111.6	179.6	MS 531 north – Bay Springs	Southern terminus of MS 531
Jones	Gitano	117.2	188.6	MS 529 south – Hebron	Northern terminus of MS 529
Jones	Soso	120.5	193.9	MS 533 north – Stringer, Bay Springs	Southern terminus of MS 533
Jones	Soso	120.7	194.2	MS 29 south – Ellisville	Northern terminus of MS 29
Jones	Calhoun	126.4	203.4	US 84 – Laurel, Collins	Eastern terminus
1.000 mi = 1.609 km; 1.000 km = 0.621 mi: Concurrency terminus
