= Mark Tullos =

American lawyer and politician

Member of the Mississippi House of Representatives from the 79th district
- Incumbent
- Assumed office 2016
- Preceded by: Blaine Eaton

Personal details
- Party: Republican
- Profession: Lawyer

Mark Tullos is an American lawyer and politician from the state of Mississippi. A Republican, Tullos is a member of the Mississippi House of Representatives, representing the 79th district.

Tullos is from Raleigh, Mississippi, where he maintains a law practice. He faced Blaine Eaton, a Democrat and the incumbent representative, in the November 2015 election to the Mississippi House seat in the 79th district. Both candidates received 4,589 votes, requiring a tiebreaker. They drew straws to determine the winner.

Although Eaton drew the winning straw, Tullos appealed the result to the Republican-controlled House. A five-member committee then invalidated five votes from Eaton's initial vote tally that were cast via affidavit, and voted 4–1 to seat Tullos instead of Eaton. The full House then voted to seat Tullos instead, giving Republicans a three-fifths supermajority of the Mississippi House of Representatives.
