= Blaine Eaton =

American politician

Blaine Eaton II

Member of the Mississippi House of Representatives from the 79th district
- In office 1996 – January 20, 2016
- Succeeded by: Mark Tullos

Personal details
- Born: Blaine H. Eaton II; September 11, 1967 (age 59) Laurel, Mississippi, United States
- Party: Democratic
- Education: Mississippi State University

Blaine Eaton II (born September 11, 1967) is an American politician, farmer, and logger. He is a former member of the Mississippi House of Representatives from the 79th District, serving from 1996 to 2016. He is a member of the Democratic Party.

== Early life and education ==
Eaton was born in Taylorsville, Mississippi, United States. He studied at Jones County Junior College and at Mississippi State University from which he graduated with a Bachelor of Science (BS) degree.

== Political career ==
Eaton was first elected to the Mississippi House of Representatives in 1996. He held the same seat that his grandfather once did.

In November 2015, the election for the 79th district seat resulted in a draw. Both Eaton and his opponent (the Republican Mark Tullos) received exactly 4,589 votes. As per state law, the two candidates drew straws to determine the winner. As Eaton drew the longer straw, he was declared the winner and was therefore re-elected to the Mississippi House of Representatives. His win prevented the Republicans from achieving a three-fifths supermajority in the House.

However, Eaton was unhappy with having won the election through a game of chance. In a statement made before the drawing of straws, he said; "It's wrong – philosophically, morally ... It's archaic, it's medieval, and it's wrong". After winning, he said he would accept the result but would attempt to change the law that governs election ties. Although Eaton drew the long straw, Tullos appealed the result to the Republican-controlled House, which decided to seat Tullos instead after deciding that five ballots were invalid because the voters did not file a written change of address with the local registrar. Eaton's lawyer filed a lawsuit in federal court on behalf of the five Smith County voters whose ballots were thrown out, arguing that they were denied their federal constitutional right to vote. That case was dismissed by U.S. District Judge Carlton Reeves who claimed he didn't have jurisdiction over the matter. The voters then filed an appeal with the 5th Circuit Court of Appeals. Oral arguments at the 5th Circuit were heard in December 2017. In May 2018, the 5th Circuit ended the dispute by declaring that federal courts lack jurisdiction over a dispute about a state legislative seat leaving Tullos the winner.

== Personal life ==
Eaton is married to Susanne (née Magee). He is a member of a Southern Baptist church.

Eaton is a Freemason and a member of the Taylorsville Lions Club. He is also a member of the American Farm Bureau Federation, the American Forestry Association, the National Rifle Association of America, and the Mississippi Cattlemen's Association.
