= Nic Lott =

American politician (born 1979)

- Born: May 8, 1979 (age 47); Taylorsville, Mississippi, U.S.
- Education: University of Mississippi
- Occupation: Public official
- Political party: Republican
- Children: 1

Nicholas A. Lott (born May 8, 1979) is the first black student to have been elected student body president at the University of Mississippi at Oxford. Lott defeated five other candidates in the race at an institution once characterized by its strong support of segregation.

Lott previously worked under former Senate majority leader Trent Lott (no relation), and U.S. representative J.C. Watts of Oklahoma's 4th congressional district, an African-American who left Congress in 2003. He has interned in The White House in 2001 under U.S. president George W. Bush. During the 2003 Mississippi gubernatorial campaign, Lott was director of youth outreach for the successful GOP nominee, Haley Barbour. Following Barbour's victory over incumbent Democratic governor Ronnie Musgrove, Lott joined Barbour's administration as senior advisor for communications and public safety issues for the Mississippi Department of Corrections. He also served as an administrator for the Office of Justice Programs under the Department of Public Safety.

He is the former state chairman for the Mississippi Young Republicans and former state chairman for the Mississippi College Republicans.

Lott ran unsuccessfully for the Mississippi State Senate in 2007, having lost that race by sixty-eight votes.

Lott served in Governor Phil Bryant's administration as director of special compliance operations for renewal recovery.

An alumnus of the U. S. Senate's African-American Leadership Summit, Lott is included in Who's Who in Black Mississippi, Top 40 Under 40 by the Mississippi Business Journal, VIP Magazine's "Top 10 Fascinating People" and the Business Chronicle's "Young Guns: Top Business and Community Leaders." He currently serves on the advisory committee of the United States Commission on Civil Rights and the board of the Congress of Racial Equality. He is a member of the boards of the Mississippi Community Education Center, Big Brothers Big Sisters of Mississippi, the United Way of America, Leadership Greater Jackson Executive Committee, Coalition of Young Conservative Leaders, Young Leaders in Philanthropy, United Healthcare Advisory Board, and the University of Mississippi Central Alumni Board. He is a former member of the University of Mississippi's College of Liberal Arts Alumni Board .

He s one of eight "Pink Tie Guys" named by the Mississippi chapter of the Susan G. Komen Foundation. Pink Tie Guys serve as ambassadors for the organization in raising awareness about breast cancer and raising funds for research.

Lott blogged for CNN's Anderson Cooper 360 during the inauguration of President Barack Obama. He appears as a political commentator and guest on multiple outlets including CNN, Fox News, WRBJ-TV, WJSU-TV, and WMPN-TV. Lott recently appeared on a CNN Special Series focused on successful innovators working to make improvements within African-American communities. He is a weekly contributor to WJSU's political radio show "Issues and Images", a winner of the Mississippi Association of Broadcasters Award for Excellence in a Series, and serves on the advisory panel of The Washington Post. Lott appears in the documentary Mississippi Remixed, a fresh look at race relations in the Deep South.

Lott has a son, also named Nicholas.

In 2019, he was a Republican candidate for Public Service Commissioner in the Central District.

== Book References ==
The 2000 Presidential Election in the South By Robert P. Steed, Laurence W. Moreland

An American Insurrection By William Doyle

Sons of Mississippi By Paul Hendrickson
