= McBride, Mississippi =

- Unincorporated community
- Location within Mississippi Location within the United States
- Coordinates: 31°45′57″N 90°46′56″W
- Country: United States
- State: Mississippi
- County: Jefferson
- Elevation: 348 ft (106 m)
- Time zone: UTC-6 (Central (CST))
  - Summer (DST): UTC-5 (CDT)
- Zip code: 39668
- Area codes: 601 & 769
- GNIS feature ID: 692054

McBride is an unincorporated community located in Jefferson County, Mississippi, United States. A post office operated under the name McBride from 1890 to 1955.
