= Alamucha, Mississippi =

- Unincorporated community
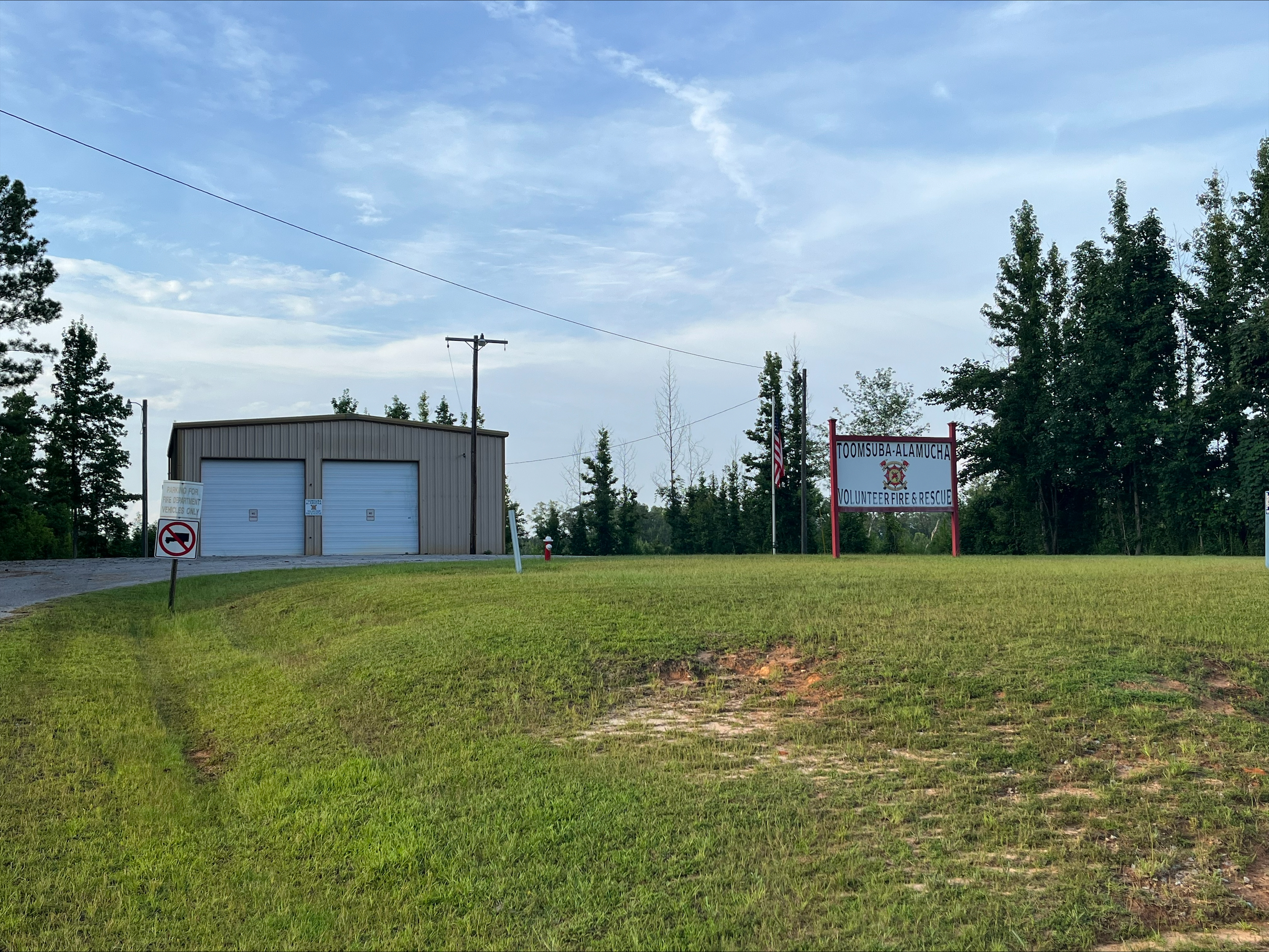
- Toomsuba-Alamucha Volunteer Fire Department

- Location in Mississippi Location in the United States
- Coordinates: 32°21′32″N 88°28′07″W
- Country: United States
- State: Mississippi
- County: Lauderdale
- Elevation: 315 ft (96 m)
- Time zone: UTC-6 (Central (CST))
  - Summer (DST): UTC-5 (CDT)
- GNIS feature ID: 691662

Alamucha (also Alamutcha) is an unincorporated community in Lauderdale County, Mississippi, United States.

It is located 16 mi (26 km) east of Meridian, and 3.5 mi (5.6 km) west of the Alabama state line.

== History ==
Alamucha originated as a Choctaw settlement, and was named for the nearby Alamuchee Creek.

Alamucha became one of the earliest non-native settlements in Lauderdale County.

A postal road was established from Marion, via Alamucha, to Gaston, Alabama in 1838, and a post office had been established in Alamucha by 1841.

Lodge No. 130 of the Grand Masonic Lodge of Mississippi was established in Alamucha in 1850.

=== Civil War ===
In 1861, local plantation owner Peter H. Bozeman recruited men to serve in "The Alamucha Infantry", of which Bozeman was captain. Volunteers from Clarke, Lauderdale, Newton and Tippah counties joined the Alamucha Infantry (Company E), which was attached to the 13th Infantry. John J. McElroy, a merchant from Alamucha, enlisted in Bozeman's Company in May 1861, and the following month participated in the Battle of First Manassas. Later in the war, Leonidas Polk, a general in the Confederate States Army, temporarily evacuated his troops to a location near Alamucha.

== Decline ==
Alamucha began to decline during 1850s and 1860s as railroads were constructed through neighboring communities.

All that remains today at the settlement are some homes along Highway 496, and a station of the Alamucha Volunteer Fire and Rescue Department.

== Notable people ==
- Willard F. McMurray, co-founded Trumpet Records with his wife Lillian McMurry
