= Taylorsville, Mississippi =

- Town
- Taylorsville Town Hall
- Motto: "Grow With Us..."
- Location of Taylorsville, Mississippi

- Location in the United States
- Coordinates: 31°49′48″N 89°25′49″W
- Country: United States
- State: Mississippi
- County: Smith

Area
  - Total: 3.86 sq mi (9.99 km^{2})
  - Land: 3.86 sq mi (9.99 km^{2})
  - Water: 0 sq mi (0.00 km^{2})
- Elevation: 276 ft (84 m)

Population (2020)
  - Total: 1,148
  - Density: 297.6/sq mi (114.92/km^{2})
- Time zone: UTC-6 (Central (CST))
  - Summer (DST): UTC-5 (CDT)
- ZIP code: 39168
- Area code: 601
- FIPS code: 28-72400
- GNIS feature ID: 0678604
- Website: https://www.visittvillems.org/

Taylorsville is a town located in southeastern Smith County, Mississippi, United States. The population was 1,148 at the 2020 census. It is the most populous community in Smith County.

== History ==
Taylorsville was established on the Gulf and Ship Island Railroad in 1900. The site was selected by an employee of the railroad, and soon after a post office was built. The post office was originally located about five miles away in Old Taylorsville (now a community located off of Mississippi Highway 531), but was later moved to New Taylorsville. It was the moving of the post office to New Taylorsville that established the present location of the town.

Soon after, the Old Stringer Hotel was built. Many years later, in 1946, it was burned down in an arson fire. The town of Taylorsville was founded as a result of the extensive pine forests that grow in Smith County and the surrounding areas. The vast majority of the area was cut by Eastman-Gardiner. As lumber was a very plentiful resource, new businesses and homes both were rapidly built.

There are a variety of industries present in Taylorsville, including lumber, manufacturing, signage, agriculture, and finance. Taylorsville is the headquarters of Southern Pine Electric, an electric co-op chartered in March 1938 to serve 481 homes and farms. Today, Southern Pine Electric is one of the largest electric cooperatives in the United States with nearly 10,000 miles of energized line serving more than 65,000 meters. The 11-county service area encompasses 14.3% of the total land mass of Mississippi.

On March 15, 2025, a large and destructive EF2 tornado ripped through town, resulting in extensive damage.

=== Suspected Lynching of Rasheem Carter ===
On October 2, 2022, Rasheem Carter, an African-American man, went missing after working a contracting job in Taylorsville. Immediately prior to his disappearance, Carter had contacted both his mother and local police officials to report that he was being harassed by three truckloads of unidentified men that had worked on the job with him and been following him while yelling racial slurs. Carter's decapitated remains were found two months after his disappearance.

The case garnered international attention after a trail camera was found to have captured an image of a shirtless and bruised Carter wandering through the woods south of the town on the day of his disappearance. Though it remains unsolved, the racially charged nature of the incident and Taylorsville's reputation as a sundown town have led the case to frequently be cited as a modern lynching.

Furthermore, the controversy surrounding the Taylorsville police department's handling of the case has led to accusations of corruption and calls for a federal probe into the department. On April 29, 2023, a large protest calling attention to the police's alleged misconduct took place in Taylorsville.

== Geography ==
According to the United States Census Bureau, the city has a total area of 3.7 square miles (9.6 km^{2}), all land. The city is located just west of the Leaf River, which passes under Mississippi Highway 28 about 1 mile outside of the Taylorsville city limits. The Leaf River is a main tributary of the Pascagoula River, which flows to the Gulf of Mexico.

== Demographics ==
Historical population
Census	Pop.	Note	%±
1910	623		—
1920	601		−3.5%
1930	805		33.9%
1940	955		18.6%
1950	1,116		16.9%
1960	1,132		1.4%
1970	1,299		14.8%
1980	1,387		6.8%
1990	1,412		1.8%
2000	1,341		−5.0%
2010	1,353		0.9%
2020	1,148		−15.2%
U.S. Decennial Census

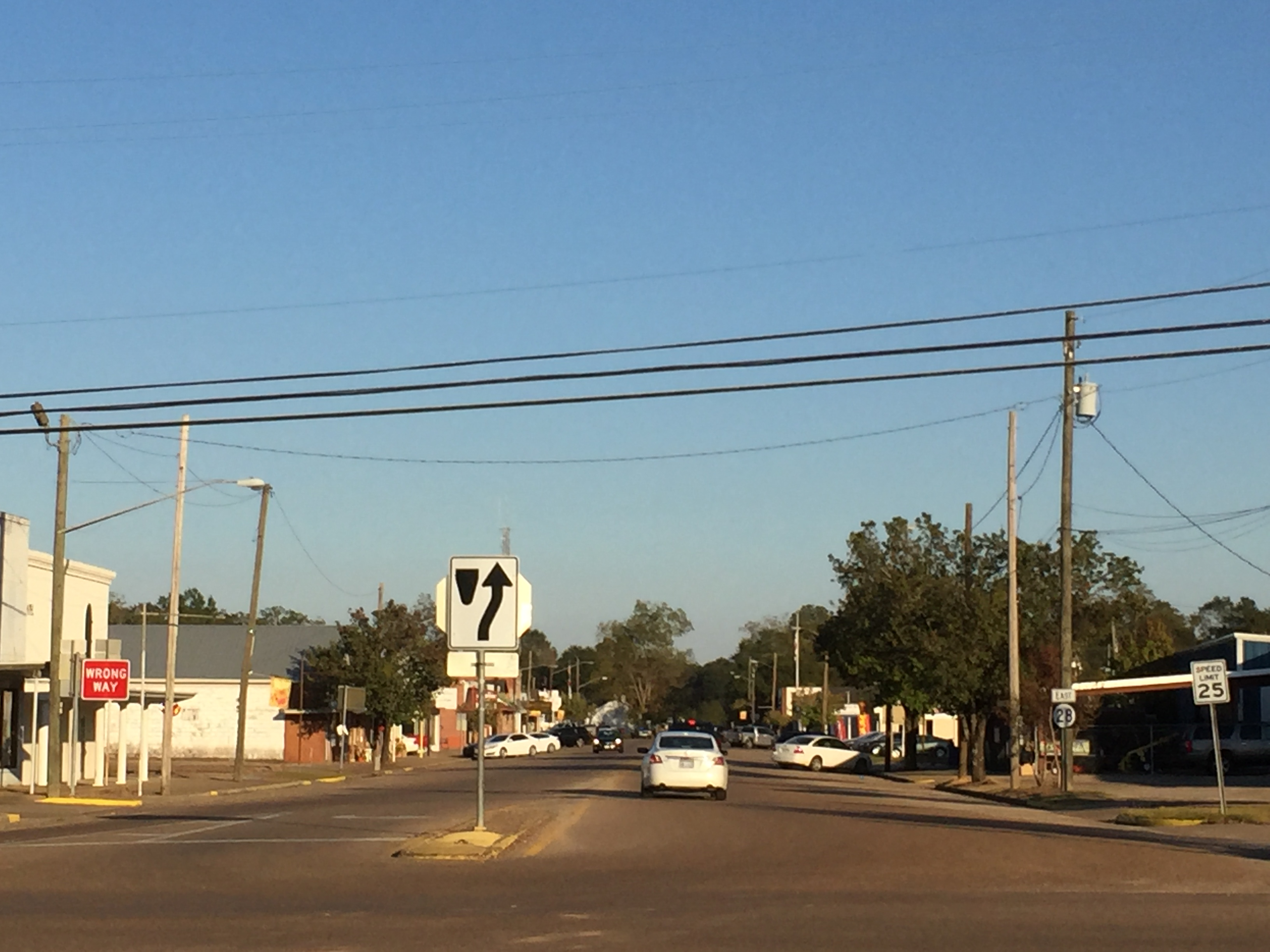
Downtown Taylorsville

=== 2020 census ===
Taylorsville racial composition
Race	Num.	Perc.
White (non-Hispanic)	751	65.42%
Black or African American (non-Hispanic)	337	29.36%
Native American	1	0.09%
Asian	2	0.17%
Other/Mixed	23	2.0%
Hispanic or Latino	34	2.96%

As of the 2020 United States census, there were 1,148 people, 654 households, and 460 families residing in the town.

=== 2010 census ===
As of the census of 2010, there were 1,353 people, 534 households, and 375 families residing in the town. The population density was 364.3 inhabitants per square mile (140.7/km^{2}). There were 598 housing units at an average density of 162.4 per square mile (62.7/km^{2}). The racial makeup of the town was 81.58% White, 17.75% African American, 0.37% from other races, and 0.30% from two or more races. Hispanic or Latino people of any race were 0.37% of the population.

There were 534 households, out of which 35.0% had children under the age of 18 living with them, 53.2% were married couples living together, 14.0% had a female householder with no husband present, and 29.6% were non-families. 28.5% of all households were made up of individuals, and 16.5% had someone living alone who was 65 years of age or older. The average household size was 2.48 and the average family size was 3.05.

In the town, the population was spread out, with 26.2% under the age of 18, 8.9% from 18 to 24, 26.3% from 25 to 44, 22.5% from 45 to 64, and 16.0% who were 65 years of age or older. The median age was 38 years. For every 100 females, there were 88.1 males. For every 100 females age 18 and over, there were 82.0 males.

The median income for a household in the town was $28,563, and the median income for a family was $38,958. Males had a median income of $30,776 versus $20,096 for females. The per capita income for the town was $15,202. About 12.5% of families and 16.1% of the population were below the poverty line, including 24.1% of those under age 18 and 10.2% of those age 65 or over.

== Arts and culture ==
=== BBQ festival ===
The Grillin' N Chillin' Barbecue Festival is a two-day event that is held each year in Taylorsville on the first weekend in November. The festival starts on Friday night with the barbecue teams firing up the grills to compete for various prizes.

On Saturday morning, the town closes a one-mile stretch of Mississippi Highway 28 for the car and bike show, which features prizes and a burnout competition. The festival has been a great success for the town, bringing in much-needed tourism dollars and attracting barbecue cooks from all over Mississippi and the southeastern United States.

== Education ==
Taylorsville Attendance Center is a public school governed by the Smith County School District. The Taylorsville Tartars Football Team has a total of 8 State Championships from 1991, 1994, 1995, 1998, 2002, 2017, 2019, and 2020. The Taylorsville Tartars Baseball Team has a total of 8 State Championships from 1990, 1997, 2006, 2011, 2013, 2014, 2021, and 2024. The Taylorsville Lady Tartars Softball Team has a total of 3 State Championships from 2016, 2017, and 2022. Taylorsville also has The First Baptist Church of Taylorsville Christian School, a K4–6th grade private school operated by the church.

== Media ==
Taylorsville is served by two newspapers: The Smith County Reformer and The Post. Both provide news on a local level, while television and high-speed internet provides wider-scale news. Radio station WBBN-FM 95.9 (B95), is licensed to Taylorsville with its studios in Laurel.

== Infrastructure ==
=== Transportation ===
The city has no public transit system other than the bus routes to Taylorsville High School, but is served by several Mississippi state highways and one county highway.

State highways

- Mississippi Highway 28
- Mississippi Highway 37
- Mississippi Highway 531

Taylorsville is located approximately 10 miles from U.S. Highway 84. The town is connected to a railroad system which connects to the West Taylorsville Industrial Park and runs west to Magee.

== Notable people ==
- Jason Campbell, football player
- Roman Ducksworth Jr., murdered military police officer
- Tim Duckworth, football player
- Blaine Eaton II, politician
- Billy Hamilton, baseball player
- Marcus Keyes, football player
- Nic Lott, politician
- Prentiss Walker, former Congressman
