= Matherville, Mississippi =

Unincorporated community in Mississippi, US

Coordinates: 31°51′57″N 88°33′56″W

Matherville is an unincorporated community located in Wayne County, Mississippi, United States. Matherville is located in the northeast corner of Wayne County, just to the west of the state of Alabama. The elevation of Matherville is 289 feet (88 m).
