= Allen, Mississippi =

Unincorporated community in Mississippi, United States

- Unincorporated community
- Location within Mississippi Location within the United States
- Coordinates: 34°08′45″N 90°14′02″W
- Country: United States
- State: Mississippi
- County: Quitman
- Elevation: 151 ft (46 m)
- Time zone: UTC-6 (Central (CST))
  - Summer (DST): UTC-5 (CDT)
- Area code: 662
- GNIS feature ID: 666198

Allen is an unincorporated community in Quitman County, Mississippi, United States. Allen is located on the Tallahatchie River, southeast of Lambert.
