= Hermanville, Mississippi =

- Census-designated place
- Location within Mississippi Location within the United States
- Coordinates: 31°57′34″N 90°50′24″W
- Country: United States
- State: Mississippi
- County: Claiborne

Area
  - Total: 3.10 sq mi (8.03 km^{2})
  - Land: 3.09 sq mi (8.01 km^{2})
  - Water: 0.0077 sq mi (0.02 km^{2})
- Elevation: 167 ft (51 m)

Population (2020)
  - Total: 692
  - Density: 223.9/sq mi (86.44/km^{2})
- Time zone: UTC-6 (Central (CST))
  - Summer (DST): UTC-5 (CDT)
- ZIP code: 39086
- Area codes: 601 & 769
- GNIS feature ID: 671128

Hermanville is a census-designated place and unincorporated community in Claiborne County, in southwest Mississippi, United States. Its ZIP code is 39086.

Per the 2020 Census, the population was 692.

== History ==
Hermanville was established on March 15, 1886. The town's economy was based on cotton, cattle, and timber products.

The Episcopal Church of the Epiphany was built in Hermanville in 1887. By 1982, the congregation had become inactive as population decreased. In 1985 the building was moved to the Mississippi Agriculture and Forestry Museum in Jackson, where it is used as a chapel.

The Natchez, Jackson and Columbus Railroad was completed in 1882, and a depot was established in Hermanville. Known locally as "The Little J", the line ran between the state capital of Jackson and Natchez. It had various owners; the last was the Illinois Central Railroad, which abandoned the line in railroad industry restructuring between 1979 and 1981.

During the early 1960s, a lumber mill in Hermanville was producing 10,000,000 board feet (24,000 m^{3}) of high-quality southern pine annually.

The Pink Palace in Hermanville was described in 2000 as "probably the most photogenic juke joint in Mississippi". The building was constructed of three side-by-side mobile homes with their common walls removed. The inside walls were painted in folk art.

Author Nevada Barr wrote of Hermanville in 2000:

The town, if such a humble scatter of buildings around a crossroads and a single-room post office could be called a town, embodied the Northerner's view of the "real" Mississippi. The gracious homes of Natchez were not in evidence, nor was the classic architecture...seen in Port Gibson and the city of Clinton. Trailer houses and shacks sat at odd angles to the two-lane road as if they had fallen haphazardly from a passing cargo plane.

== Demographics ==
Historical population
Census	Pop.	Note	%±
2020	692		—
U.S. Decennial Census; 2020

Hermanville was first listed as a census designated place in the 2020 U.S. census.

=== 2020 census ===
Hermanville CDP, Mississippi – Racial and ethnic composition Note: the US Census treats Hispanic/Latino as an ethnic category. This table excludes Latinos from the racial categories and assigns them to a separate category. Hispanics/Latinos may be of any race.
Race / Ethnicity (NH = Non-Hispanic)	Pop 2020	% 2020
White alone (NH)	18	2.60%
Black or African American alone (NH)	663	95.81%
Native American or Alaska Native alone (NH)	2	0.29%
Asian alone (NH)	0	0.00%
Native Hawaiian or Pacific Islander alone (NH)	0	0.00%
Other race alone (NH)	0	0.00%
Mixed race or Multiracial (NH)	5	0.72%
Hispanic or Latino (any race)	4	0.58%
Total	692	100.00%

== Education ==
Hermanville is served by the Claiborne County School District. Port Gibson High School is the comprehensive high school of the district.

== Notable people ==
- Maxwell Bodenheim, Jazz Age poet and novelist known as the "King of Greenwich Village Bohemians".
