= Mississippi State Highway System =

Highway system in Mississippi (state), United States

Mississippi Highway System
- Standard route shields for Interstate, U.S. Highways, and state highways, respectively

System information
- Length: 11,164.467 mi (17,967.468 km)

Highway names
- Interstates: Interstate X (I-X)
- US Highways: U.S. Route X (US X)
- State: Mississippi Highway X (MS X)

System links
- Mississippi State Highway System; Interstate; US; State

The Mississippi State Highway System is a network of roads that are maintained by the Mississippi Department of Transportation (MDOT). This network includes Interstate, U.S., and state highways.

== Highway systems ==
=== Interstate highways ===
There are nine interstate highways within the state of Mississippi. This includes six primary interstates and three auxiliary interstates. The longest interstate is I-55, and the shortest interstate is I-110.

=== U.S. routes ===
In the state of Mississippi, there are 14 U.S. highways. The longest is US 49, and the shortest being US 425.

=== Mississippi highways ===
State highways in Mississippi have different numbering schemes. The primary highways are numbered from 1-76, and most three-digit numbered routes are numbered by region (300s in the northernmost part of the state, 600 in the southernmost). Three-digit numbered routes from 700s to 900s are usually short connectors and spurs.

=== Other highways ===
Natchez Trace Parkway starts in Natchez and ends at Nashville, Tennessee. The parkway is maintained by the National Park Service.

== History ==
In 1928, Mississippi Governor Theodore G. Bilbo appointed Horace Stansel head of a committee to investigate the state's highway needs. Stansel submitted an act to create a state highway system to the state legislature in 1930. Since then, Mississippi has gradually expanded its highway system.

Until 1987, there were but two major four-lane highways in Mississippi, not counting the Interstates, which were built during the 1960s and 1970s: U.S. Highway 49 (US 49) from Yazoo City to Gulfport and US 82 between Greenville and Winona. Things changed when the state legislature launched the $1.3 billion Four-Lane Highway Program of 1987. This program gradually allowed for the funding of over 1,000 miles (1,600 km) of four-lane highway statewide. In 2002, the Four-Lane Highway Program was expanded in what was known as Vision 21.

MDOT was not created until 1992; this organization consolidated several services that already existed.
