= Mississippi Department of Transportation =

Government agency in Jackson, Mississippi, U.S.

Mississippi Department of Transportation (MDOT)
- Seal

- Logo

Agency overview
- Jurisdiction: State of Mississippi
- Headquarters: 401 North West Street, Jackson, Mississippi, U.S.
- Agency executives: Brad White, Executive Director; Earl Glenn, P.E., Deputy Executive Director/Chief Engineer; Lisa Hancock, Deputy Executive Director/Administration; Jim Willis, P.E., Director of Intermodal Planning; Jeff Ely, P.E., Chief of Staff
- Parent agency: Mississippi Transportation Commission
- Website: mdot.ms.gov

The Mississippi Department of Transportation (MDOT) is the organization in charge of developing and maintaining all state and federal roadways in the U.S. state of Mississippi. In addition to highways, the department also has a limited role in supporting Mississippi's public transportation system, ports and waterways system, aeronautics and railroads. MDOT is headquartered in downtown Jackson.

== Role and responsibility ==
MDOT is responsible for providing a safe intermodal transportation network that is planned, designed, constructed and maintained in an effective, cost-efficient and environmentally sensitive manner. MDOT's objective is to maximize taxpayers' dollars by providing a safe, efficient multimodal network that enhances economic stability and growth. In reality, they do close to nothing at all.

== History ==
In 1916, the Mississippi State Highway Commission was formed by the Mississippi Legislature with three elected commissioners to act in a supervisory capacity in the administration of federal funds allotted to the state and to work with the Federal Bureau of Public Roads on planning a system of highways. The bill was signed on March 29, 1916, passing the first state speed limit law which restricted travel to 15 mph in towns and 30 mph outside of populated areas. Four years later, the highway system was reorganized to broaden the scope of the commission's work, and it expanded to eight members elected from each of the state's congressional districts.

The Mississippi Legislature enacted the "Stansel Act" in 1930 creating the first effective Highway Department and highway system in the state. This law changed the number of highway commissioners from eight to three. This three-member elected Highway Commission (elected from each of the Supreme Court districts) had full and general supervisory responsibility over all highway matters and the authority to appoint an executive director of the State Highway Department with responsibility over the day-to-day operation of the agency.

In 1956, life was given to the interstate system with the establishment of the Federal Highway Act, which piloted the interstate highway era. The law allowed the Federal Government to provide 90 percent of funds necessary for the construction of interstates.

In 1981, the passage of House Bill 1383 shifted highway investment priorities from construction to maintenance of existing roads, and in 1987, the Mississippi Legislature passed a long-range highway program, which was one of the most comprehensive in the country. The development of Mississippi's transportation system over the past 25 years has grown in large part due to the provisions of this act which came to be known as the 1987 Four-Lane Highway Program or Advocating Highways for Economic Advancement and Development (A.H.E.A.D.). This program was designed as a means to fund the effort of moving Mississippi's citizens and goods through a shared vision among legislative leaders and grass-roots advocates.

In July 1992, the State Highway Commission and Highway Department were reorganized into the Mississippi Department of Transportation (MDOT) which is governed by the Mississippi Transportation Commission. Similar to the previous Highway Commission, the state of Mississippi vests oversight of its transportation resources and operations in a three-member elected Commission representing three geographic areas in the state—Central, Northern and Southern. In accordance with state law, the Commissioners have the authority and responsibility for the supervision of all modes of transportation in the state dealing with aeronautics, highways, public transit, ports and rails.

The Transportation Commission is authorized to appoint an executive director of MDOT responsible for administering the policies of the commission and exercising day to day supervision over administrative and technical matters relating to airport and port development, highway construction and maintenance, weight enforcement, public transit and rail safety. Today, the organization has expanded to over 3,400 employees with 35 divisions and six districts.

In 2016, MDOT celebrated 100 years of service by recognizing several major milestones that shaped that state's transportation history. A centennial event was held on the anniversary of the establishment of the State Highway Commission.

== Educational outreach ==
MDOT's Education Outreach Programs impact tens of thousands of people each year with transportation-related information.

MDOT partners with K-12 schools, community and junior colleges, and universities, the Mississippi Department of Education, government agencies and other organizations to provide transportation education programs and resources in addition to enhancing STEM (Science, Math, Technology, Engineering and Math) education while introducing students to careers in the transportation industry.

=== Transportation and Civil Engineering (TRAC) ===
The Transportation and Civil Engineering, or TRAC, program is a hands-on education program designed for use in science, technology, engineering and math classes. By engaging students in 7–12 in solving real-world problems, TRAC connects students to the work world of transportation and inspires them to consider careers in transportation and civil engineering.

=== Roadways Into Developing Elementary Students (RIDES) ===
Roadways Into Developing Elementary Students, or RIDES, program is designed to improve math, science, engineering and technology skills, and prepare students in K-8 for the transportation workforce of the future, specifically in civil engineering. Teachers attend two days of high-energy training conducted by practicing math and science teachers. The module contains a curriculum and a trunk of resources for the teachers to use in the classroom to conduct hands-on activities. Through The American Association of State Highway Transportation Officials (AASHTO) RIDES has been implemented nationwide as a model transportation education outreach program.

=== Litter Prevention Education ===
The Litter Prevention Program targets students in grades K-8 through a 30-minute presentation utilizing a character named "Myrtle the Turtle" and the state's litter prevention campaign message, "Don't Trash Mississippi." In 2017, Litter Prevention Coordinators educated 21,160 students through classroom presentations across the state.

=== Survive Your Drive Safety Education ===
The "Survive Your Drive" Safety Education Program raises awareness of highway traffic safety issues faced by Mississippi motorists, including occupant protection/seat belt use, impaired driving, and distracted driving. Safety professionals provide education and outreach at schools and community events across the state. Through presentations and simulator demonstrations, the public is educated with the driving knowledge and skills to make Mississippi highways safe.

=== Safe Routes to School ===
Safe Routes to School (SRTS) is a federally funded program designed to enable and encourage students in K-12 to walk and bicycle to school safely. Through SRTS, pedestrian and bicycle safety instruction is delivered to second and fifth grade students, parents, schools and community members across Mississippi, promoting safe walking and biking as a fun, healthy way for travel to and from school.

=== Operation Lifesaver ===
Mississippi Operation Lifesaver (MSOL) is a nonprofit public safety education organization committed to eliminating the number of incidents at highway-rail grade crossings and trespassing on railroad rights-of-way. MSOL reached over 31,000 Mississippians from July 1, 2016, to June 30, 2017.

=== Mississippi Summer Transportation Institute ===
The Mississippi Summer Transportation Institute (MSTI) introduces diverse groups of motivated pre-college students to the transportation industry. The two to three week residential program is a learning opportunity for youth in public and private high schools. MSTI provides a well-balanced curriculum and an environment that is conducive to both academic and personal development.
