= Mississippi Highway 468 =

Highway in Mississippi

Mississippi Highway 468

Route information
- Maintained by MDOT
- Length: 20.417 mi (32.858 km)
- Existed: 2000–present

Major junctions
- West end: MS 475 in Flowood
- US 49 / US 80 in Pearl; MS 477 in Pearl; I-20 in Pearl; MS 475 in Whitfield; MS 469 in Greenfield; MS 18 in Brandon
- East end: US 80 in Brandon

Location
- Country: United States
- State: Mississippi
- Counties: Rankin

Highway system
- Mississippi State Highway System; Interstate; US; State
← MS 467	→ MS 469

Mississippi Highway 468 (MS 468) runs from Mississippi Highway 475 in Flowood, Mississippi where it is known as Flowood Drive to MS 469 in Brandon, Mississippi. It is known as Pearson Road in Pearl, Mississippi.

== Route description ==
MS 468 starts at MS 475 in Flowood and travels southwestwards along Flowood Drive. The route turns southward near Fourth Street in downtown Flowood. At U.S. Route 80 (US 80) in Pearl, MS 468 is briefly concurrent with the U.S. route, before splitting of southwards at an intersection with MS 477 as Pearson Road. The road crosses over Interstate 20 (I-20) at a diamond interchange and later turns southeastwards at Whitfield Road. It intersects the southern terminus of MS 475 near the Mississippi State Hospital and crosses over a railroad near Greenfield. MS 468 then intersects MS 469 and turns north at Bethel Road. At Greenfield Circle, the road turns northeastwards and meets MS 18 near Brandon. It turns east at Pine Lawn Drive, and the route turns north at South College Street. MS 468 ends at US 80 in downtown Brandon, and the road continues north as North College Street.

== Major intersections ==
The entire route is in Rankin County.

Location	mi	km	Destinations	Notes
Flowood	0.000	0.000	MS 475 (Airport Road) to MS 25 / I-20 – Pearl, Jackson-Medgar Wiley Evers International Airport	Western terminus
Flowood	1.801	2.898	MS 477 (Treetops Boulevard and West Rankin Parkway)	
Flowood			Future I-755	Proposed I-755 also known as Airport Parkway
Flowood–Pearl line	5.864	9.437	US 80 west / MS 18 west to I-20 / I-55 / US 49 – Jackson	West end of US 80/MS 18 overlap
Flowood–Pearl line	7.017	11.293	US 80 east / MS 18 east / MS 477 north – Downtown Pearl, Brandon	Eastern end of US 80/MS 18 concurrency, southern terminus of MS 477
Pearl	7.849– 8.095	12.632– 13.028	I-20 – Jackson, Meridian	I-20 exit 48; Diamond interchange
Whitfield	12.532	20.168	MS 475 north (Airport Road South) – Hudspeth Regional Center	Southern terminus of MS 475
Greenfield	15.027	24.184	MS 469 south – Florence	Northern terminus of MS 469
Brandon	19.026	30.619	MS 18 – Pearl, Puckett, Raleigh	
Brandon	20.417	32.858	US 80 (Government Street) to I-20 – Pearl, Pelahatchie	Eastern terminus
1.000 mi = 1.609 km; 1.000 km = 0.621 mi: Concurrency terminus; Proposed
