= Mississippi Highway 18 =

Highway in Mississippi

Mississippi Highway 18

Route information
- Maintained by MDOT
- Length: 185.5 mi (298.5 km) (177.654 mi excluding concurrencies)
- Existed: 1932–present

Major junctions
- West end: US 61 in Port Gibson
- I-20 in Jackson; US 80 in Jackson; US 49 / MS 468 in Pearl; US 80 in Brandon; I-59 in Pachuta; US 11 in Pachuta; US 45 in Quitman
- East end: CR 20 at Alabama border near Quitman

Location
- Country: United States
- State: Mississippi
- Counties: Claiborne, Copiah, Hinds, Rankin, Smith, Jasper, Clarke

Highway system
- Mississippi State Highway System; Interstate; US; State
← MS 17	→ MS 19

Mississippi Highway 18 (MS 18) is a state highway stretching across central Mississippi, from just a couple miles inland of the Mississippi River, through the state capital of Jackson, to the Alabama state line. It runs from east to west for 177.654 miles (285.906 km), serving 7 counties: Claiborne, Copiah, Hinds, Rankin, Smith, Jasper, and Clarke.

== Route description ==
MS 18 begins in Claiborne County in Port Gibson at an intersection with US 61, just across the Little Bayou Pierre from downtown. It heads east as a two-lane highway through neighborhoods before leaving Port Gibson at an interchange with the Natchez Trace Parkway. The highway travels through somewhat hilly terrain for the next several miles, where it passes through Hermanville and Carlisle, before entering Copiah County. MS 18 travels through the northwestern corner of the county, where it passes through Carpenter, crosses Bayou Pierre, and passes by the Utica campus of Hinds Community College, before entering Hinds County.

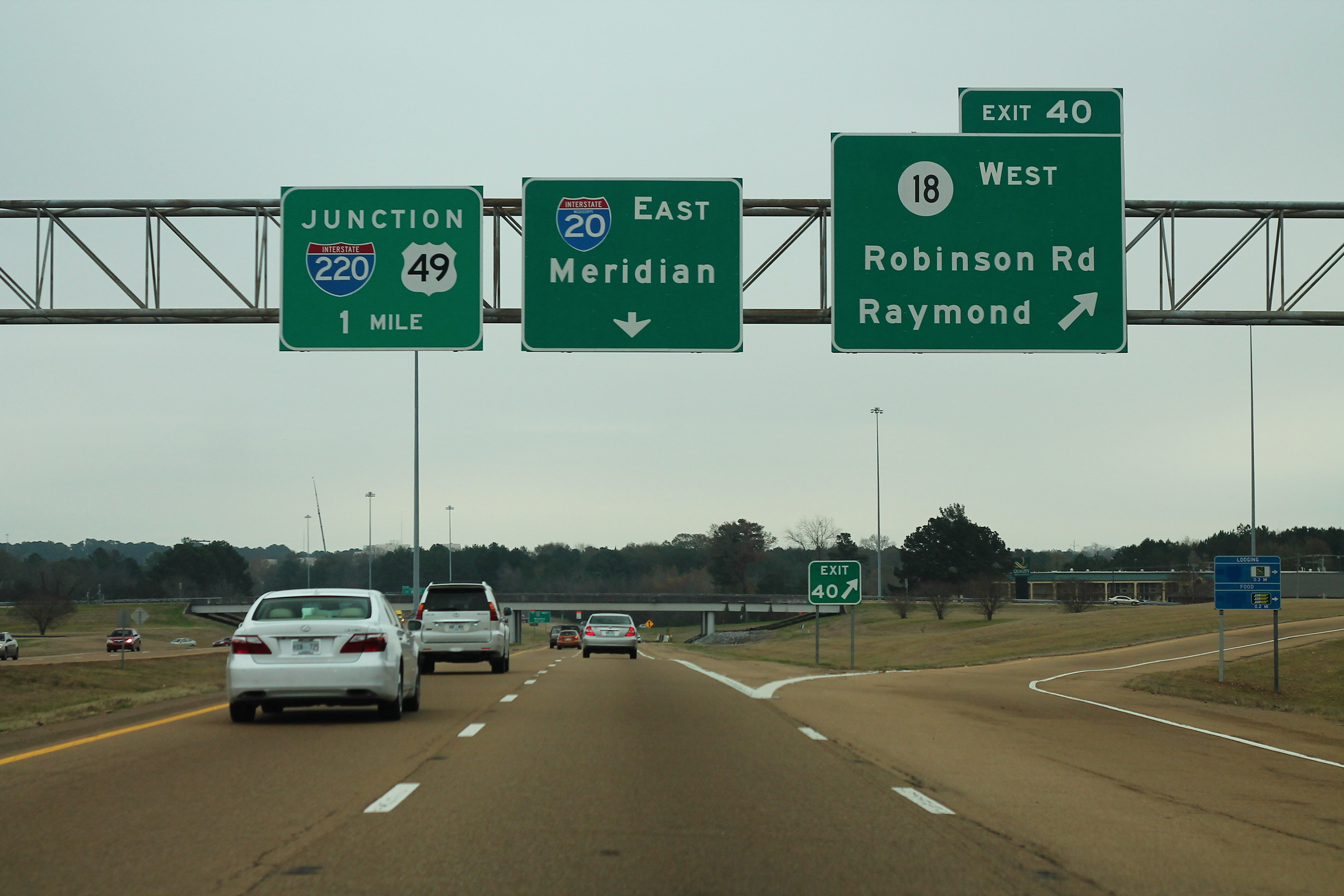
I-20 eastbound at its first interchange with MS 18 in western Jackson (Exit 40)

MS 18 curves northeastward as it passes through the town of Utica, bypassing downtown along it southeast side as it has a concurrency (overlap) with MS 27. The highway travels through farmland for several miles, where it passes through Raymond (having a junction with MS 467 there) and widens to a four-lane divided highway, before entering the Jackson city limits and having an interchange with I-20 (Exit 40 A/B). MS 18 becomes concurrent with US 80 and they head east as a four-lane undivided highway through a business district to have an interchange with I-220/US 49 (Exit 1 A/B). US 80/MS 18 pass through a mix business districts and neighborhoods for a few miles as they travel just to the south of Jackson State University, while paralleling I-20/I-55 just to the north. The highway passes along the southern edge of downtown, where they have interchanges with West Street and US 51 (State Street), before crossing the Pearl River to leave both Jackson and Hinds County to enter Rankin County.

US 80/MS 18 immediately enter Pearl and widen to a divided highway as they pass under I-55 (without an interchange) and have an intersection with Old Highway 49 S before coming to an intersection between US 49 and MS 468 (Flowood Drive). MS 468 joins the concurrency and the highway passes a business district, where MS 468 splits off on Pearson Road, and US 80/MS 18 have an intersection with MS 475 (Airport Road) near Jackson–Medgar Wiley Evers International Airport before entering neighboring Brandon. The highway passes through some neighborhoods before entering a business district, where MS 18 splits off and heads south to have another interchange with I-20 (Exit 54) before narrowing to two-lanes. MS 18 bypasses downtown along its southern edge, passing through an extremely rural and wooded area for a few miles before passing through neighborhoods, where it has another intersection with MS 468 (Whitfield Road). The highway has an intersection with Louis Wilson Drive (Old MS 18) before leaving Brandon and traveling southeast through a mix of rural farmland and woodlands for the next several miles. MS 18 has an intersection with MS 43 before passing through Puckett, where it has an intersection with MS 13. The highway crosses a bridge over the Strong River to pass through Galilee, where it becomes concurrent with MS 541 before entering Smith County.

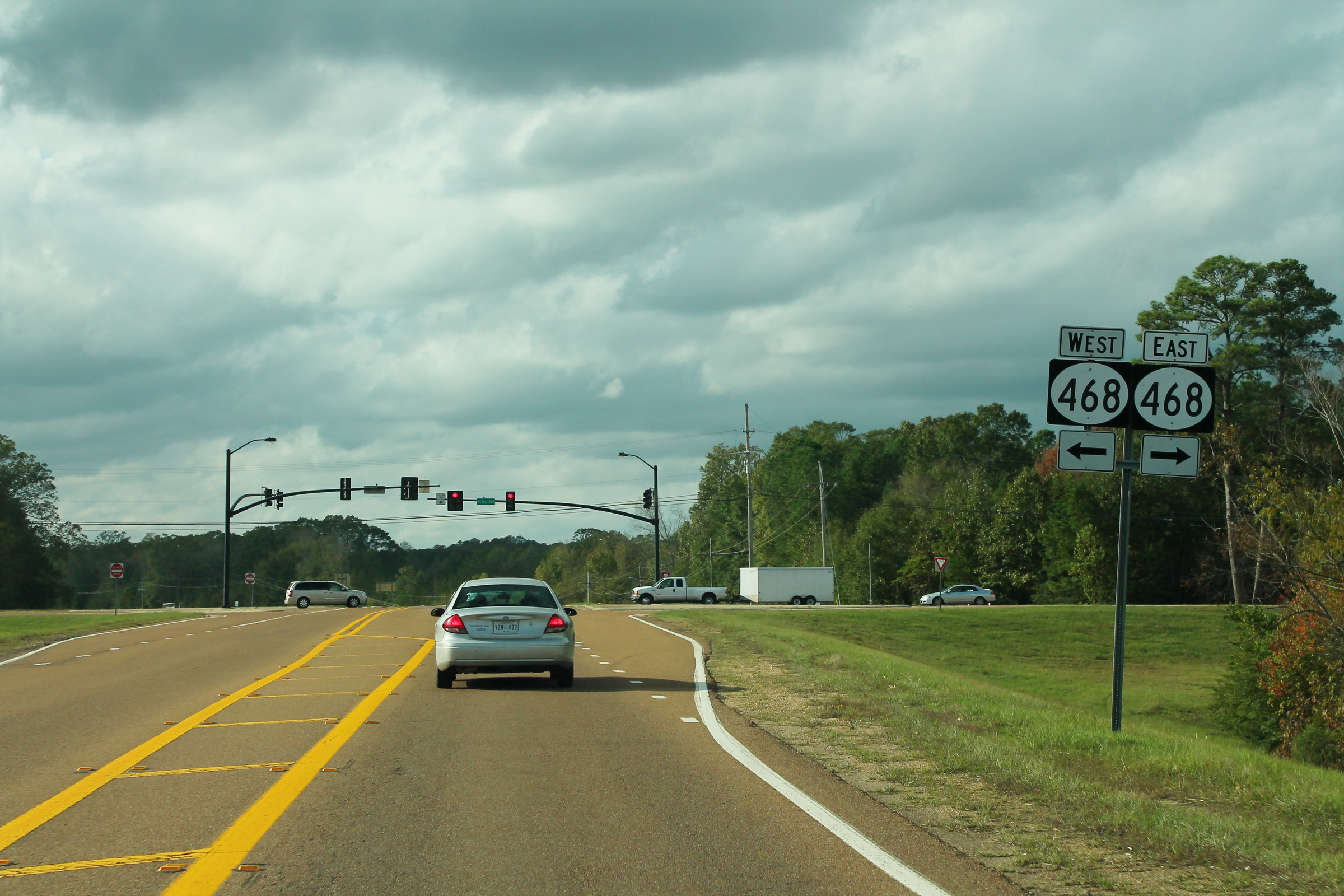
Mississippi Highway 18 at its third and final intersection with Mississippi Highway 468 in the southern outskirts of Brandon

The highway passes through White Oak, where MS 541 splits off and heads north, and MS 18 travels east through woodlands (part of the Bienville National Forest) for several miles to enter Raleigh. MS 18 passes through neighborhoods and a business district before passing along the northern edge of downtown, where it has an intersection with MS 35. The highway now leaves Raleigh and travels through more woodlands to cross the Leaf River and have an intersection with MS 501 before passing through the village of Sylvarena. MS 18 now enters Jasper County.

MS 18 immediately enters Bay Springs at a junction with MS 531 and travels through some neighborhoods before passing through downtown, where it has an intersection with MS 15. It now leaves Bay Springs and heads northeast through a mix of farmland and wooded areas for several miles, where it has a short concurrency with MS 503, before passing through Rose Hill, where it has a junction with MS 513. The highway makes a sharp turn to the southeast for several miles to cross into Clarke County.

MS 18 travels through woodlands an interchange with I-59 (Exit 126) before straight through downtown Pachuta, where it has a concurrency with MS 512, as well as having an intersection with US 11. The highway leaves Pachuta and travels east through a mix of farmland and woodlands for several miles to become concurrent with MS 145 and they head north to cross the Chickasawhay River into Quitman. MS 18/MS 145 almost immediately enter downtown, with MS 18 splitting off at another junction with MS 512. MS 18 heads east through neighborhoods to cross over Archusa Creek Lake and have an intersection with MS 511 before coming to an interchange with US 45. MS 18 now leaves Quitman and travels east through remote, wooded, and hilly terrain for the next several miles (part of the North Central Hills portion of the Appalachian Mountains) to come to the Alabama state line, where MS 18 ends and the road continues into the state towards Butler as Choctaw County Road 20 (CR 20).

== Major intersections ==
County	Location	mi	km	Destinations	Notes
Claiborne	Port Gibson	0.0	0.0	US 61 – Natchez, Vicksburg, Grand Gulf State Park	Western terminus
Claiborne		1.2	1.9	Natchez Trace Parkway	Interchange
Claiborne	Hermanville	8.0	12.9	Old Highway 18 #4	To MS 548
Claiborne	Hermanville	8.4	13.5	MS 819 south (Railroad Avenue)	Northern terminus of unsigned MS 819
Copiah	No major junctions				
Hinds	Utica	27.0	43.5	MS 27 south – Crystal Springs	Western end of MS 27 overlap
Hinds		28.4	45.7	MS 27 north – Vicksburg	Eastern end of MS 27 overlap
Hinds	Raymond	44.6	71.8	MS 467 north – Raymond, Edwards	Southern terminus of MS 467
Hinds	Jackson	53.5– 53.9	86.1– 86.7	I-20 – Vicksburg, Meridian	I-20 exit 40
Hinds	Jackson	54.3	87.4	John R. Lynch Street / Morson Road	Interchange
Hinds	Jackson	54.7	88.0	US 80 west / MS 476 east – Clinton	Becomes unsigned; western end of US 80 overlap, western terminus of MS 476
Hinds	Jackson	55.1– 55.5	88.7– 89.3	I-220 / US 49 – Vicksburg, Grenada, Yazoo City, Hattiesburg	I-220 exits 1 A/B
Hinds	Jackson	58.8	94.6	West Street	Interchange; no access from to West Street from westbound US 80/MS 18
Hinds	Jackson	59.1– 59.2	95.1– 95.3	US 51 (State Street) to I-20 / I-55 / US 49 – Downtown	Interchange
Rankin	Pearl	60.8	97.8	MS 149 south (Old Hwy 49) to US 49 – Richland	Northern terminus of unsigned Richland segment of MS 149
Rankin	Pearl	60.8	97.8	MS 468 west to US 49 / I-20 / I-55 – Hattiesburg, Flowood, Grenada, McComb, Yazoo City, Vicksburg, Meridian	Western end of MS 468 overlap
Rankin	Pearl	61.9	99.6	MS 468 east (Pearson Road) / MS 477 north (West Rankin Parkway) – Whitfield, Flowood	Eastern end of MS 468 overlap, southern terminus of MS 477
Rankin	Pearl	65.7	105.7	MS 475 (Airport Road) to I-20 / MS 25 – Jackson–Medgar Wiley Evers International Airport, Whitfield	
Rankin	Brandon	67.9	109.3	US 80 east (West Government Street) – Pelahatchie	Becomes back signed; eastern end of US 80 overlap
Rankin	Brandon	68.2– 68.5	109.8– 110.2	I-20 – Meridian, Jackson	I-20 exit 54
Rankin	Brandon	71.8	115.6	MS 468 – Whitfield, Brandon	
Rankin	Puckett	88.8	142.9	MS 43 north – Pelahatchie	Southern terminus of northern segment of MS 43
Rankin	Puckett	90.4	145.5	MS 13 – Morton, Mendenhall	
Rankin		93.2	150.0	MS 541 south – Magee	Western end of MS 541 overlap
Smith	White Oak	96.2	154.8	MS 541 north – Polkville	Eastern end of MS 541 overlap
Smith	Raleigh	106.7	171.7	MS 35 – Forest, Mize	
Smith		114.3	183.9	MS 501 north – Forest	Southern terminus of MS 501
Smith	Sylvarena	115.8	186.4	MS 917 north (Old 18 Drive)	Southern terminus of unsigned MS 917
Jasper	Bay Springs	120.4	193.8	MS 531 south – Taylorsville	Northern terminus of MS 531
Jasper	Bay Springs	122.0	196.3	MS 15 – Newton, Heidelberg, Laurel	
Jasper		138.8	223.4	MS 503 south – Paulding, Lake Claude Bennett	Western end of MS 503 overlap
Jasper		138.9	223.5	MS 503 north – Hickory	Eastern end of MS 503 overlap
Jasper	Rose Hill	143.1	230.3	MS 513 south – Enterprise	Northern terminus of MS 513
Clarke	Pachuta	151.4– 151.6	243.7– 244.0	I-59 – Meridian, Laurel	I-59 exit 126
Clarke	Pachuta	153.1	246.4	MS 512 west – Lake Eddins, Paulding	Western end of MS 512 overlap
Clarke	Pachuta	153.3	246.7	US 11 – Sandersville, Heidelberg, Enterprise	
Clarke		155.6	250.4	MS 512 east	Eastern end of MS 512 overlap
Clarke		164.5	264.7	MS 145 south – Waynesboro	Western end of MS 145 overlap
Clarke	Quitman	166.8	268.4	MS 145 north / MS 512 west – Meridian, Pachuta	Eastern end of MS 145 overlap; eastern terminus of MS 512
Clarke	Quitman	168.0	270.4	MS 511 south – Archusa Creek Water Park	Northern terminus of MS 511
Clarke		170.1	273.7	US 45 – Meridian, Waynesboro	Interchange
Clarke		185.5	298.5	CR 20 east – Butler	Alabama state line; eastern terminus
1.000 mi = 1.609 km; 1.000 km = 0.621 mi: Concurrency terminus; Incomplete access
