= Mississippi Highway 469 =

Highway in Mississippi

Mississippi Highway 469
- MS 469 highlighted in blue

Route information
- Maintained by MDOT
- Length: 30.30 mi (48.76 km)
- Existed: c. 1953–present

Major junctions
- South end: MS 28 near Georgetown
- US 49 in Florence
- North end: MS 468 in Greenfield

Location
- Country: United States
- State: Mississippi
- Counties: Simpson, Rankin

Highway system
- Mississippi State Highway System; Interstate; US; State
← MS 468	→ MS 471

Mississippi Highway 469 (MS 469) is a state highway in central Mississippi, located in Simpson and Rankin counties. The route starts at MS 28 near Georgetown, and it travels north through western Simpson County. The road enters the community of Harrisville and enters Rankin County soon after. It intersects U.S. Route 49 (US 49) in Florence, and it ends at MS 468 near Whitfield. The route was designated in 1953, and it was extended southwards to MS 20 (currently MS 28) in 1956. By 1960, all of the route was paved with asphalt.

== Route description ==
Traffic volume on Mississippi Highway 469
Location	Volume
South of Marino Road	840
Northwest of Rosie Drive	1,400
North of Cotton Road	1,400
South of Magee Lane	4,100
Florence City Park	8,800
South of Lewis Street	9,400
San Parker Lane	15,000
East of US 49	7,700
West of Indian Creek Drive	11,000
South of Genesis	4,000
Northeast of Monterey Road	3,800
Data was measured in 2016 in terms of AADT; Source:

MS 469 is located in Simpson and Rankin counties. The route is legally defined in Mississippi Code § 65-3-3, and all of it is maintained by the Mississippi Department of Transportation (MDOT), as part of the Mississippi State Highway System.

The route starts at MS 28 at a three-way junction east of Georgetown, and travels north through a forested area. The road turns east briefly at Sells Walker Road, and it continues northward at Bear Cat Road. The route parallels Big Creek until it reaches Harrisville, where it turns west at the western terminus of MS 540, also known as Harrisville Road. At Mulligan Road, MS 469 begins to travel northwestward and crosses Limestone Creek after intersecting Bridge Road. The road travels north at Twin Lakes Road, then northeastward at Country Estates Road. The route enters Rankin County, with its last intersection in Simpson County again at Twin Lakes Road.

Inside Rankin County, the route turns north at South County Line Road, and crosses Hominy Creek near Mountain Creek Road. Proceeding through a mix of farmland and forests, the road crosses Mountain Creek south of McGee Lane and enters the town of Florence at Old US 49. MS 469, known as South Church Street inside the town, intersects multiple driveways and an entrance to a park. The route turns east at West Main Street near the center of Florence and intersects US 49 after crossing the Illinois Central Railroad. Past US 49, the road is known as East Main Street, and it crosses Indian Creek near Briarhill Road. The route continues through suburban parts of the town, with Florence High School located at Williams Road. MS 469 then turns east past Eastwood Drive, curving around an unincorporated area, before turning north at the eastern end of Williams Road. The corporate limit of the town follows the edges of the road until the intersection of MS 469 and Monterey Road in the community of Monterey. The road continues northeastward past that point, crossing Richland Creek after another intersection with Monterey Road. The route reemerges out of a forested area, near the community of Whitfield. The road ends at a three-way junction at MS 468, southeast of the Mississippi State Hospital and the Central Mississippi Correctional Facility.

== History ==
A road from US 49 to Whitfield was constructed around 1953, with half of it already paved with asphalt. The MS 469 designation began its use starting that year. By 1956, a new road was constructed from US 49 to MS 20, and the section from Harrisville to the Simpson–Rankin county line was paved in 1955. The road opened as part of MS 469, in a ribbon ceremony in Harrisville on November 29, 1956. The route at MS 469's terminus, MS 20, was renumbered to MS 28 in January 1960 to avoid numbering conflicts with Interstate 20. All of MS 469 was paved in asphalt by September 1960, after the remaining 7.2 miles (11.6 km) were paved in a $47,137.01 (equivalent to $501,010 in 2024) project started in April of that year.

== Major intersections ==
County	Location	mi	km	Destinations	Notes
Simpson	Union, Simpson County	0.0	0.0	MS 28 – Pinola, Georgetown	Southern terminus
Simpson	Harrisville	7.2	11.6	MS 540 east – D'Lo	Western terminus of MS 540
Rankin	Florence	22.4	36.0	US 49 – Jackson, Hattiesburg	
Rankin	Greenfield	30.3	48.8	MS 468 – Whitfield, Brandon	Northern terminus
1.000 mi = 1.609 km; 1.000 km = 0.621 mi

== See also ==
- List of Mississippi state highways
