= Mississippi Highway 475 =

Highway in Mississippi

Mississippi Highway 475

Route information
- Maintained by MDOT
- Length: 7.407 mi (11.920 km)

Major junctions
- South end: MS 468 in Greenfield
- I-20 in Pearl
- North end: MS 25 in Flowood

Location
- Country: United States
- State: Mississippi
- Counties: Rankin

Highway system
- Mississippi State Highway System; Interstate; US; State
← MS 473	→ MS 476

Mississippi Highway 475 (MS 475) is a highway in central Mississippi. Its southern terminus is at MS 468. It then travels north to Jackson–Evers International Airport, and ends at MS 25 just north of it.

== Route description ==
MS 475 starts at its intersection with MS 468 near the unincorporated area of Whitfield. The road travels north through rural Rankin County and enters the city of Pearl. The route travels through a commercialized area and changes to a divided highway. MS 475 intersects Interstate 20 (I-20) at a diamond interchange and then travels to its at-grade intersection with US 80 soon after. The highway intersects Old Brandon Road at a diamond interchange, with an extra ramp that leads to the airport's entrance. The road travels adjacent to the airport until its intersection at MS 468. MS 475 ends at MS 25 in northeast Flowood.

== Major intersections ==
The entire route is in Rankin County.

Location	mi	km	Destinations	Notes
Whitfield	0.0	0.0	MS 468 – Pearl, Greenfield	Southern terminus
Pearl	2.4– 2.6	3.9– 4.2	I-20 – Jackson, Meridian	I-20 exit 52; diamond interchange
Pearl	3.4	5.5	US 80 / MS 18 – Brandon	
Pearl	3.6– 4.1	5.8– 6.6	Old Brandon Road / International Drive – Jackson–Evers International Airport	Diamond interchange with ramp to roundabout
Flowood	6.8	10.9	MS 468 east (Flowood Drive)	Western terminus of MS 468
Flowood	7.4	11.9	MS 25 (Lakeland Drive) to I-55 – Jackson, Carthage	Northern terminus
1.000 mi = 1.609 km; 1.000 km = 0.621 mi
