= Mississippi Highway 501 =

State highway in Mississippi

Mississippi Highway 501

Route information
- Maintained by MDOT and City of Forest
- Length: 26.891 mi (43.277 km)
- Existed: 1953–present

Major junctions
- South end: MS 18 near Sylvarena
- North end: US 80 in Forest

Location
- Country: United States
- State: Mississippi
- Counties: Smith, Scott

Highway system
- Mississippi State Highway System; Interstate; US; State
← MS 500	→ MS 502

Mississippi Highway 501 (MS 501) is a state highway in central Mississippi that runs north–south from MS 18 near Sylvarena, Smith County to U.S. Route 80 (US 80) in Forest, Scott County. Most of the highway runs within the Bienville National Forest and it does not junction with any other state highways except at its termini.

== Route description ==
MS 501 begins at a stop-controlled T intersection to the west of Sylvarnea's town limits. The highway heads north through a mostly wooded area with some homes and fields dotting the surroundings. The road crosses into Bienville National Forest, but the general landscape is similar to what it was outside of the national forest. MS 501 passes through the unincorporated community of Pineville where a general store, a church, and some houses are in the vicinity. After crossing into Scott County, the road's general direction changes slightly to the north-northeast, still within the national forest. The state highway passes through the community of Norris and crosses over Interstate 20 without an interchange and the road forms the boundary of Forest's city limits. MS 501 passes a softball field and arena complex before entering a more residential neighborhood of the city where it follows Main Street. The highway passes a Koch Foods plant before shifting its course slightly to the west. At Oak Street, state maintenance of MS 501 ends and the road falls under city maintenance. The road crosses a railroad at-grade before entering the city's central business district. At 1st Street, MS 501 makes a pair of 90-degree turns in front of the Scott County Courthouse. After passing businesses for two blocks, MS 501 ends at an intersection with US 80. The road continues as Hillsboro Street.

== History ==
MS 501 was first created in 1953 on an unimproved road running from Louin, Jasper County at MS 15 to Forest by way of Pineville. An unnumbered state highway had existed on this alignment since 1951, however. By 1955, the road east of Pineville had been removed from the state highway system, though the remaining portion within Smith County was paved. About two years later, an unimproved road south of Pineville to MS 18 had been added to the highway system. MS 501's alignment has largely remained unchanged since then.

== Major intersections ==
County	Location	mi	km	Destinations	Notes
Smith		0.000	0.000	MS 18 – Bay Springs, Raleigh	Southern terminus
Scott	Forest	26.891	43.277	US 80 / Hillsboro Street	Northern terminus
1.000 mi = 1.609 km; 1.000 km = 0.621 mi
