= Mississippi Highway 477 =

Highway in Mississippi

Mississippi Highway 477

Route information
- Maintained by MDOT
- Length: 4.2 mi (6.8 km)

Major junctions
- South end: US 80 / MS 468 in Pearl MS 468 in Flowood
- North end: MS 25 in Flowood

Location
- Country: United States
- State: Mississippi
- Counties: Rankin

Highway system
- Mississippi State Highway System; Interstate; US; State
← MS 476	→ MS 478

Mississippi Highway 477 (MS 477) is a short highway in Central Mississippi, running between US 80 and MS 25. It carries the names West Rankin Pkwy and Treetops Blvd through its route.

== Route description ==
MS 477 starts in Pearl at an intersection with US 80 and MS 468. It then continues north with the name West Rankin Parkway as a four lane divided highway. Soon, it has another intersection with MS 468 before becoming Treetops Blvd. Now, the route travels north into Flowood and shortly after, ends at an intersection with MS 25.

== History ==
On November 25, 2025, a new 3.6 mile section of the highway, known as the West Rankin Parkway, was opened to traffic, connecting US 80 to MS 25.

== Major intersections ==
The entire route is in Rankin County.

Location	mi	km	Destinations	Notes
Pearl–Flowood line	0.0	0.0	US 80 / MS 18 / MS 468 – Jackson, Brandon	southern terminus
Flowood			Future I-755	Proposed I-755 also known as Airport Parkway
Flowood	3.6	5.8	MS 468 – Pearl	former southern terminus
Flowood	4.2	6.8	MS 25 – Carthage, Jackson	Northern terminus
1.000 mi = 1.609 km; 1.000 km = 0.621 mi: Proposed
