= Interstate 20 in Mississippi =

Highway in Mississippi

Interstate 20
- I-20 highlighted in red

Route information
- Maintained by MDOT
- Length: 154.5 mi (248.6 km)
- NHS: Entire route

Major junctions
- West end: I-20 / US 80 at the Louisiana state line in Vicksburg
- US 61 in Vicksburg; I-220 / US 49 in Jackson; I-55 in Jackson and Richland; US 49 in Richland; I-59 near Meridian; US 45 in Meridian
- East end: I-20 / I-59 at the Alabama state line near Cuba, AL

Location
- Country: United States
- State: Mississippi
- Counties: Warren, Hinds, Rankin, Scott, Newton, Lauderdale

Highway system
- Interstate Highway System; Main; Auxiliary; Suffixed; Business; Future; Mississippi State Highway System; Interstate; US; State
← MS 19	→ MS 21

Interstate 20 (I-20) is a major thoroughfare through the central region of the US state of Mississippi. Spanning 154.5 miles (248.6 km), it connects Jackson and I-55 with Vicksburg and the Mississippi River in the west and Meridian and I-59 in the east.

== Route description ==
Interstate 20 enters in east from Tallulah, Louisiana into Vicksburg, Mississippi. It starts with an interchange with U.S. Route 61 South towards Natchez, Mississippi and then starts to make interchanges with the city's streets. Once I-20 is out of the city it leaves the city with a partial cloverleaf interchange with U.S. Route 61 North towards Rolling Fork, Mississippi and Mississippi Highway 27 South towards Utica, Mississippi. Along the way with Mississippi Highway 22 towards Flora, Mississippi. It then enters the Jackson area with Clinton, Mississippi and makes a partial cloverleaf interchange with Natchez Trace Parkway, U.S. Route 80 towards Clinton-Raymond Road, and 3rd one with Springridge Road. It then goes into Jackson with a partial cloverleaf interchange with Mississippi Highway 18 towards Raymond, Mississippi. After that, it makes its first interstate interchange with Interstate 220 (Mississippi), the city's bypass interstate. U.S Route 49 South then enters the interstate and makes a full cloverleaf interchange with Ellis Avenue. It then enters a spaghetti interchange with Interstate 55 and U.S. Route 49 South and it runs concurrent with both of those for 1 exit and then they all split in an interchange that Jackson calls "The Stack". This interchange splits making I-55 go north towards Downtown Jackson and Memphis, Tennessee. It makes I-20 continue east towards Forest, Mississippi and Meridian, Mississippi. Then, it makes US-49 go south towards Collins, Mississippi and Hattiesburg, Mississippi. After coming out of Jackson, the interstate makes interchanges with Mississippi Highway 468, Mississippi Highway 475 (which gives access to the Jackson–Medgar Wiley Evers International Airport), Mississippi Highway 18, U.S. Route 80, Mississippi Highway 43, Mississippi Highway 13, Mississippi Highway 481, Mississippi Highway 35, Mississippi Highway 15, and Mississippi Highway 503. As it enters Meridian, it makes its 4th and final interstate interchange with Interstate 59 towards Laurel, Mississippi and New Orleans. making Interstate 59 run concurrently with Interstate 20. As they go into the city, they make highway interchanges with Mississippi Highway 19 and U.S. Route 11. They then go into downtown making an interchange with Mississippi Highway 145. After this, they make one interchange with 4 highways: Mississippi Highway 19, Mississippi Highway 39, U.S. Route 11, and U.S. Route 80. After the Jimmie Rodgers Parkway interchange, they encounter a cloverleaf interchange with U.S. Route 45 toward Quitman, Mississippi and Tupelo, Mississippi. After diamond interchanges with Russell-Mount Gilead Road in Russell and Will Garrett Road in Toomsuba, and a trumpet interchange with US 11/80 in Kewanee, the interstates encounter weigh stations in both directions before entering the Alabama state line heading towards Tuscaloosa, Alabama and Birmingham, Alabama where they run for a total of 153 miles.

== Exit list ==
County	Location	mi	km	Exit	Destinations	Notes
Mississippi River		0.00	0.00		I-20 west / US 80 west – Monroe	Continuation into Louisiana
Mississippi River		0.00	0.00	Vicksburg Bridge; Louisiana–Mississippi state line		
Warren	Vicksburg	0.44	0.71	1A	US 61 Bus. (Warrenton Road)	Two quadrant interchange
Warren	Vicksburg	1.19	1.92	1B	US 61 south – Natchez, Baton Rouge	Western end of US 61 overlap
Warren	Vicksburg	1.94	3.12	1C	Halls Ferry Road	
Warren	Vicksburg	3.21	5.17	3	Indiana Avenue	
Warren	Vicksburg	4.65	7.48	4	Clay Street – Vicksburg National Military Park, Downtown Vicksburg	Signed as exits 4A (east) and 4B (west); westbound exit to Clay Street west and eastbound entrance to eastbound I-20 are via exit 5B
Warren	Vicksburg	5.51	8.87	5A	US 61 north – Rolling Fork, Yazoo City, Memphis	Eastern end of US 61 overlap
Warren	Vicksburg	5.51	8.87	5B	MS 27 south – Utica	Westbound entrance is via exit 4B
Warren		11.15	17.94	11	Tiffentown Road – Bovina	
Warren		15.11	24.32	15	Ceres Boulevard – Flowers	
Hinds	Edwards	19.60	31.54	19	MS 22 to MS 467 – Flora, Edwards	
Hinds	Bolton	27.58	44.39	27	Bolton Brownsville Road – Bolton	
Hinds		31.69	51.00	31	Norrell Road	
Hinds	Clinton	34.14	54.94	34	Natchez Trace Parkway	
Hinds	Clinton	35.25	56.73	35	US 80 east / Clinton-Raymond Road	Eastern end of US 80 overlap
Hinds	Clinton	36.15	58.18	36	Springridge Road	
Hinds	Jackson	40.30	64.86	40	MS 18 / Robinson Road – Raymond	Signed as exits 40A (west) and 40B (east) westbound; MS 18 doesn’t terminate at nor have concurrency with I-20, it continues unsigned during the concurrency of US 80, then it returns back to I-20 at the other side, where the route begins to be signed again
Hinds	Jackson	41.35	66.55	41	I-220 north / US 49 north – North Jackson, Yazoo City To I-55 north – Grenada, Memphis	Southern terminus of I-220; western end of US 49 overlap; I-220 no number signed
Hinds	Jackson	42.64	68.62	42	Ellis Avenue	Signed as exits 42A (south) and 42B (north)
Hinds	Jackson	43.82	70.52	43	Terry Road	Signed as exits 43A (south) and 43B (north)
Hinds	Jackson	44.23	71.18	44	I-55 south to US 51 south / McDowell Road – McComb, New Orleans	Western end of I-55 overlap; I-55 exit 92C
Hinds	Jackson	45.08	72.55	45A	Gallatin Street	Eastbound exit is part of exit 45
Hinds	Jackson	45.51	73.24	45B	US 51 north (State Street)	Signed as exit 45 eastbound
Rankin	Richland	46.17	74.30	46	I-55 north – Grenada, North Jackson, Memphis	Eastern end of I-55 overlap; I-55 exit 94
Rankin	Richland	47.16	75.90	47	US 49 south – Hattiesburg To US 80 – Flowood	Eastern end of US 49 overlap; signed as exits 47A (south) and 47B (north) eastbound
Rankin	Pearl	48.72	78.41	48	MS 468 – Pearl	
Rankin	Pearl	52.32	84.20	52	MS 475 – Whitfield, JAN, CMCF, USPFO	
Rankin	Brandon	54.53	87.76	54	MS 18 / Crossgates Boulevard – Puckett, Raleigh	MS 18 doesn’t terminate at nor have concurrency with I-20, it continues unsigned during the concurrency of US 80, then it returns back to I-20 at the other side, where the route begins to be signed again
Rankin	Brandon	56.61	91.10	56	US 80 – Downtown Brandon	
Rankin	Brandon	59.70	96.08	59	US 80 – East Brandon	
Rankin	Pelahatchie	68.65	110.48	68	MS 43 – Puckett, Pelahatchie	
Scott		76.90	123.76	77	MS 13 – Puckett, Morton	
Scott		80.04	128.81	80	MS 481 – Raleigh, Morton	
Scott	Forest	88.04	141.69	88	MS 35 – Raleigh, Forest	
Scott		96.57	155.41	96	Lake-Norris Road / Steve Lee Drive – Lake	
Newton		99.94	160.84	100	US 80 – Lake, Lawrence	
Newton	Newton	108.92	175.29	109	MS 15 – Newton, Philadelphia	
Newton		114.48	184.24	115	MS 503 – Hickory, Decatur	
Newton		121.10	194.89	121	MS 889 south (Chunky-Duffee Road) – Chunky	
Lauderdale	Meridian	129.30	208.09	129	US 80 west – Lost Gap, Meehan Junction	Western end of US 80 overlap
Lauderdale	Meridian	130.74	210.41	130	I-59 south – Laurel, New Orleans	Western end of I-59 overlap, north exit 149; no exit number westbound
Lauderdale	Meridian	133.00	214.04	150	US 11 south / MS 19 north – Meridian Airport, Philadelphia	Western end of US 11/MS 19 overlap Exits follow I-59's mile markers Serves Mississippi State University Meridian Campus
Lauderdale	Meridian	133.47	214.80	151	Valley Road, 49th Avenue	
Lauderdale	Meridian	134.42	216.33	152	29th Avenue	
Lauderdale	Meridian	135.63	218.28	153	MS 145 south / 22nd Avenue – Quitman	
Lauderdale	Meridian	137.08	220.61	154	MS 19 south / MS 39 north / US 11 north / US 80 east – Butler, De Kalb	Eastern end of US 11/US 80/MS 19 overlap; signed as exits 154A (south) and 154B (north) eastbound
Lauderdale	Meridian	138.43	222.78	156	Jimmy Rodgers Parkway	
Lauderdale	Meridian	139.51	224.52	157	US 45 – Quitman, Macon	Signed as exits 157A (south) and 157B (north)
Lauderdale		142.94	230.04	160	Russel-Mount Gilead Road – Russell	
Lauderdale		147.46	237.31	165	Will Garrett Road – Toomsuba	
Lauderdale		151.12	243.20	169	US 11 / US 80 – Kewanee	
Lauderdale		154.42	248.51		I-20 east / I-59 north – Tuscaloosa	Continuation into Alabama
1.000 mi = 1.609 km; 1.000 km = 0.621 mi: Concurrency terminus; Incomplete access

== Jackson spur route ==
Interstate 220
- Location: Jackson-Ridgeland
- Length: 12.01 mi (19.33 km)
- Existed: 1981–present

Interstate 220 (I-220) in Mississippi is a loop around Jackson that provides an Interstate connection for I-55 and I-20. The northern terminus for the route is in the northern suburb of Ridgeland, at I-55 exit 104. The highway was Mississippi's first three-digit Interstate, complete by 1981.

The route of I-220 is defined in Mississippi Code § 65-3-3.

Interstate 20
Previous state: Louisiana	Mississippi	Next state: Alabama
