= Mississippi Highway 541 =

Highway in Mississippi

Mississippi Highway 541
- MS 541 highlighted in orange

Route information
- Maintained by MDOT
- Length: 31.15 mi (50.13 km) (37.6 mi (60.5 km) including concurrencies)
- Existed: c. 1955–present

Major junctions
- South end: Clem Road / Clem School Road near Prentiss
- US 49 in Magee
- North end: MS 13 north of Puckett

Location
- Country: United States
- State: Mississippi

Highway system
- Mississippi State Highway System; Interstate; US; State
← MS 540	→ MS 545

Mississippi Highway 541 (MS 541) runs north–south from U.S. Highway 84 (US 84), at a point about five miles (8.0 km) south of the Simpson–Jefferson Davis county line to MS 13 near Puckett. Just east of Puckett, it merges with MS 18 for a short distance. It travels directly through Magee, entering on Pinola Drive (also marked as MS 28), making a left on to Main Avenue South, a one-block jog (on 1st Street Southeast) just after Simpson Highway 149, then continuing out of town on 1st Avenue Northeast.

== History ==
Between 1946 and 1948, a gravel road was constructed from US 49 and MS 20 in Magee to MS 18 near Puckett. By 1950, a small section of the road near Magee was paved. A paving project from the end of the existing pavement in Magee to 5.064 miles (8.150 km) at Martinville began in 1955, and the MS 541 designation was first used in that year. Around a year later, MS 541 was extended southwards along a gravel road to U.S. Route 84 near Prentiss. The paving project was finished by 1958, and the route was extended northwards to MS 13 northeast of Puckett. A majority of MS 541 in Jefferson Davis County became county maintained by 1960, and all of the route from US 49 to MS 18 was paved. By 1962, more than half of the county-maintained section was paved. The section from MS 28 to MS 13 in Smith County was paved by 1968. The county-maintained section in Jefferson Davis County was removed from the state highway system by 1996.

== Major intersections ==
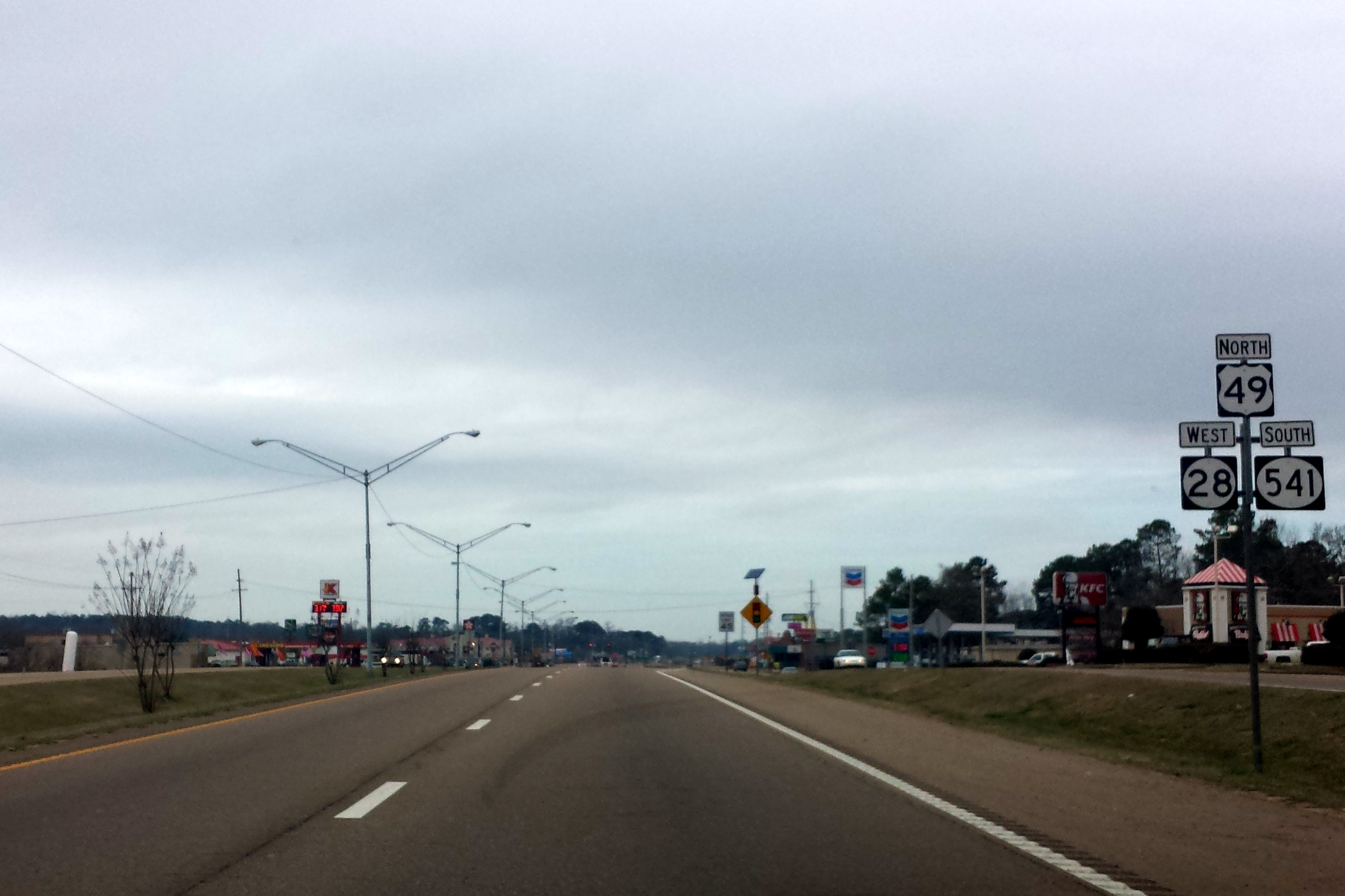
MS 28 and MS 541 briefly overlap with US 49 in Magee

County	Location	mi	km	Destinations	Notes
Jefferson Davis		0.0	0.0	Clem Road / Houston Road	Southern terminus
Simpson		12.4	20.0	MS 28 west – Hazlehurst	Southern end of MS 28 concurrency
Simpson	Magee	14.0	22.5	US 49 north – Jackson	Southern end of US 49 concurrency
Simpson	Magee	14.4	23.2	US 49 south / MS 28 east – Hattiesburg, Mize	Northern end of MS 28 concurrency; northern end of US 49 concurrency
Simpson	Magee	14.9	24.0	MS 149 north	Southern end of MS 149 concurrency
Simpson	Magee	15.0	24.1	MS 149 south	Northern end of MS 149 concurrency
Simpson		22.7	36.5	MS 540 – Mendenhall, Raleigh	
Rankin		29.5	47.5	MS 18 west – Puckett	Southern end of MS 18 concurrency
Smith		32.5	52.3	MS 18 east – Raleigh	Northern end of MS 18 concurrency
Smith		37.6	60.5	MS 13 – Puckett, Morton	Northern terminus
1.000 mi = 1.609 km; 1.000 km = 0.621 mi

== See also ==
- List of state highways in Mississippi
