= Mississippi Highway 467 =

State Highway in Mississippi

Mississippi Highway 467

Route information
- Maintained by MDOT
- Length: 15.1 mi (24.3 km)
- Existed: 1953–present

Major junctions
- South end: MS 18 in Raymond
- Natchez Trace Parkway near Raymond
- North end: I-20 / US 80 / MS 22 in Edwards

Location
- Country: United States
- State: Mississippi
- Counties: Hinds

Highway system
- Mississippi State Highway System; Interstate; US; State
← MS 465	→ MS 468

Mississippi Highway 467 (MS 467) is a short 15.1-mile-long (24.3 km) north-south highway located entirely in Hinds County in central Mississippi. It serves to connect the towns of Edwards and Raymond.

== Route description ==
MS 467 begins in the town of Raymond at an intersection with MS 18 and it heads west along Main Street through a business district, where it has an intersection with Hinds Boulevard as it passes by the Raymond Campus of Hinds Community College, before curving northward to travel straight through downtown, where it passes by the Hinds County Courthouse. The highway passes through neighborhoods for several blocks, where it has an intersection with Raymond-Bolton Road, before leaving Raymond and passing through rural woodlands for a couple miles, where it has an interchange with the Natchez Trace Parkway. MS 467 now travels northwest through a mix of farmland and woodlands for several miles to cross Bakers Creek to enter the Edwards city limits as Withers Street. It passes through neighborhoods before entering downtown, where it makes a left turn onto Utica Street. The highway re-enters neighborhoods for a few blocks before making a right turn onto Mount Moriah Road, which it follows for a couple of blocks before making a right turn onto Vicksburg Street (Old U.S. 80), which it follows back into downtown. MS 467 curves left onto Magnolia Street before curving right onto Jackson Street, which it follows to leave downtown and pass through some northern neighborhoods before coming to an end at an intersection with MS 22, not even a tenth of a mile from its interchange with I-20/US 80 (Exit 19).

The entire route of MS 467 is a rural two-lane highway.

== History ==
MS 467 was signed into law back in 1949, with it being officially designated and signs installed in 1953.

== Major intersections ==
The entire route is in Hinds County.

Location	mi	km	Destinations	Notes
Raymond	0.0	0.0	MS 18 – Jackson, Utica, Port Gibson	Southern terminus
Raymond	0.5	0.80	Hinds Boulevard – Clinton, John Bell Williams Airport	
	4.3	6.9	Natchez Trace Parkway	Interchange
Edwards	14.0	22.5	Vicksburg Street (Old US 80 west) - Bovina	
Edwards	15.1	24.3	MS 22 east – Flora To I-20 / US 80 – Vicksburg, Jackson	Northern terminus; western terminus of MS 22; I-20/US 80 exit 19
1.000 mi = 1.609 km; 1.000 km = 0.621 mi
