= Mississippi Highway 476 =

Highway in Mississippi

Mississippi Highway 476

Route information
- Maintained by MDOT
- Length: 0.7 mi (1,100 m)

Major junctions
- West end: US 80 / MS 18 in Jackson
- East end: Robinson Road / Royal Oaks Drive in Jackson

Location
- Country: United States
- State: Mississippi
- Counties: Hinds

Highway system
- Mississippi State Highway System; Interstate; US; State
← MS 475	→ MS 477

Mississippi Highway 476 (MS 476) is a highway in Central Mississippi. The western terminus is at US 80/MS 18 in Jackson. The eastern terminus is at Robinson Road/Royal Oaks Drive in Jackson.

== Route description ==
MS 476 starts at US 80/MS 18 in Jackson. It travels northeast as Robinson Road goes under I-220 (no interchange). Its eastern terminus is at Robinson Road and Royal Oaks Drive.

== Major intersections ==
The entire route is in Jackson, Hinds County.

mi	km	Destinations	Notes
0.0	0.0	US 80 / MS 18 to I-220 – Clinton, Raymond	Western terminus
0.7	1.1	Robinson Road, Royals Oaks Drive	Eastern terminus
1.000 mi = 1.609 km; 1.000 km = 0.621 mi
