= Mississippi Highway 22 =

State Highway in Mississippi

Mississippi Highway 22

Route information
- Maintained by MDOT
- Length: 42.981 mi (69.171 km)
- Existed: 1950–present

Major junctions
- West end: I-20 / US 80 / MS 467 in Edwards
- US 49 in Flora; I-55 in Canton
- East end: US 51 in Canton

Location
- Country: United States
- State: Mississippi
- Counties: Hinds, Madison

Highway system
- Mississippi State Highway System; Interstate; US; State
← I-22	→ MS 23

Mississippi Highway 22 (MS 22) is a state highway in central Mississippi, United States. It runs from east to west for approximately 43 miles (69 km), serving only two counties: Madison and Hinds, while connecting the towns of Edwards, Flora, and Canton.

== Route description ==
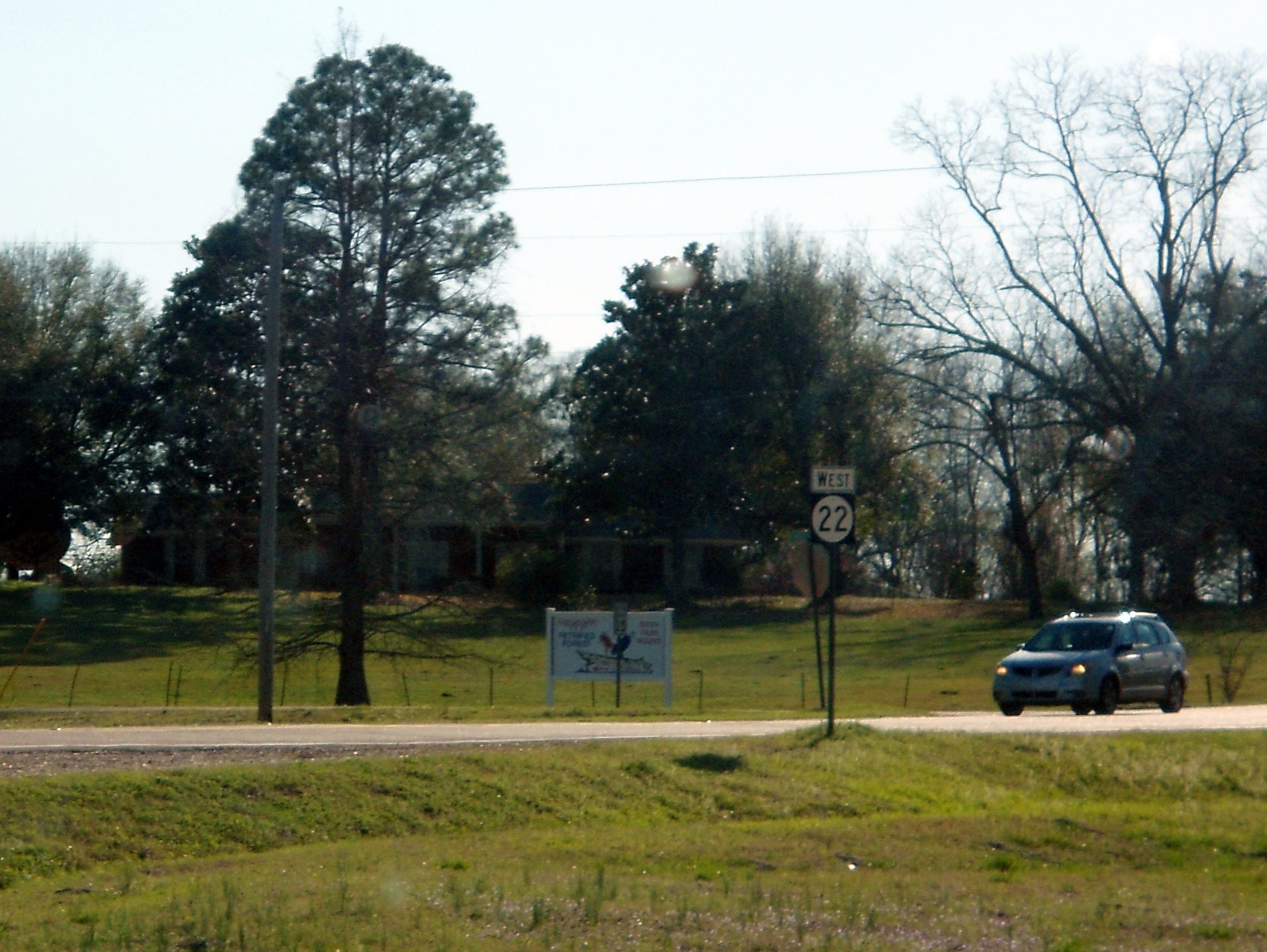
Mississippi 22 in Flora just west of the US 49 junction

MS 22 begins in rural western Hinds County in the town of Edwards at an intersection with MS 467 just north of downtown. It heads north to immediately have an interchange with I-20/US 80 (Exit 19) before leaving Edwards and winding its way northeast as a two-lane highway through a mix of farmland and wooded areas for the next several miles.

The highway now crosses into Madison County and passes by the Mississippi Petrified Forest as it enters Flora along Peach Street to have an intersection with US 49. MS 22 enters neighborhoods and makes a left turn onto Fourth Street, which it follows northward for a few blocks before making a right onto Madison Street. The highway now enters downtown at a signalized intersection with First Street, and passes straight through the center of town along Main Street. MS 22 crosses over a set of railroad tracks before leaving Flora and traveling through rural farmland for several miles, where it passes through the community of Livingston to have a junction with MS 463. The highway travels along the shores of Lake Caroline before entering the Canton city limits and immediately having intersections with Calhoun Parkway and Nissan Parkway. MS 22 becomes W Peace Street as it widens to a four-lane undivided highway and travels through a business district, where it has an interchange with I-55/MS 16 (Exit 119). The highway crosses a bridge over Bear Creek before narrowing to two-lanes at an intersection with W Fulton Street to pass through neighborhoods for several blocks before entering downtown. MS 22 comes to an end shortly thereafter at an intersection with US 51 (N/S Liberty Street) at the center of town.

== History ==
MS 22 was originally designated back in 1950, with being signed into law in 1949.

MS 22 became one of only two state highways in Mississippi (the other being MS 69) to have the same number as an Interstate or U.S. Highway within the state, with the designation of Interstate 22 (I-22) in Mississippi in 2015.

Robert Fair, a Black man, claimed in a 2023 piece for the Jackson Advocate that while he lived near Edwards in the early 1970s, Mississippi Highway Patrol officers would sometimes set up roadblocks on MS 22 around the town, to let White drivers pass through, and then stop Black drivers to harass them. Fair wrote that during one of these incidents in 1971, the officers beat him and other Black men, while calling them "nigger".

=== Original MS 22 ===
Mississippi Highway 22
- Location: Natchez–Waynesboro
- Existed: 1932–1934

MS 22 was originally designated in 1932 along a major east west highway across the southern portion of the state, running from the city of Natchez (on the banks of the Mississippi River) to the town of Waynesboro (near the Alabama state line), passing through Meadville-Bude, Brookhaven, Monticello, Prentiss, Collins and Laurel. This designation only survived two years, when in 1934 US 84 was designated along its path.

== Major intersections ==
County	Location	mi	km	Destinations	Notes
Hinds	Edwards	0.0	0.0	MS 467 south (Old U.S. 80) – Downtown, Raymond	Western terminus; northern terminus of MS 467
Hinds		0.1– 0.2	0.16– 0.32	I-20 / US 80 – Jackson, Vicksburg	I-20 exit 19
Madison	Flora	23.9	38.5	Petrified Forest Road - Mississippi Petrified Forest	Access road into park
Madison	Flora	24.0	38.6	US 49 – Yazoo City, Jackson	
Madison	Livingston	30.9	49.7	MS 463 south – Madison	Northern terminus of MS 463
Madison	Canton	39.1	62.9	Nissan Parkway east	Western terminus of Nissan Parkway
Madison	Canton	40.9– 41.0	65.8– 66.0	I-55 – Grenada, Memphis, Jackson	I-55 exit 119
Madison	Canton	43.0	69.2	US 51 (Liberty Street) / MS 16 / East Peace Street – Durant, Madison, Yazoo City, Carthage	Eastern terminus
1.000 mi = 1.609 km; 1.000 km = 0.621 mi
