= Mississippi Highway 473 =

Highway in Mississippi

Mississippi Highway 473
- MS 473 highlighted in red

Route information
- Maintained by MDOT and Terry
- Length: 4.95 mi (7.97 km)
- Existed: 1957 – 1967; 1995–present

Major junctions
- South end: Hinds–Copiah county line northeast of Crystal Springs
- North end: I-55 / US 51 in Terry

Location
- Country: United States
- State: Mississippi
- Counties: Hinds

Highway system
- Mississippi State Highway System; Interstate; US; State
← MS 472	→ MS 475

Mississippi Highway 473 (MS 473) is a short highway in central Mississippi. Its southern terminus is at the Hinds–Copiah county line. The route travels north to Terry, and turns west. MS 473 enters Terry, and ends at Interstate 55 (I-55) and U.S. Route 51 (US 51). The route was designated in 1957, from MS 27 to US 51. MS 473 was removed from the state highway system in 1967. It was restored into the system in 1995, from the county line to I-55/US 51.

== Route description ==
All of the route is a paved road, located inside Hinds County. MS 473 is legally defined in Mississippi Code § 65-3-3. In 2012, Mississippi Department of Transportation (MDOT) calculated as many as 5,300 vehicles traveling east of I-55/US 51, and as few as 1,300 vehicles traveling north of the Hinds–Copiah county line. MS 473 is maintained by Mississippi Department of Transportation for four miles (6.4 km), and Terry for 0.95 miles (1.53 km).

MS 473 starts at the Hinds–Copiah county and travels north. It passes nearby ponds and intersects various dirt roads. About one mile (1.6 km) later, MS 473 intersects Moncure Road and continues north. At Bozeman Road, the route turns northeast, passing through a small forest. The road then turns north and passes over Vaughn Creek. MS 473 intersects Rosemary Road as it turned northwest, and soon travels west near Gaines Drive and Shady Oaks Road. The route enters Terry and crossed over a railroad, owned by Canadian National and Illinois Central. The route turns northwest, and enters downtown Terry. MS 473 leaves downtown Terry, and intersects a frontage road of I-55. The route ends at I-55 at a diamond interchange, and the road continues west as Green Gable Road.

== History ==
MS 473 was designated in 1957, as a gravel road connecting from MS 27 to US 51. The next year, the section in Hinds County was paved. By 1960, MS 473 in Copiah County was transferred to local maintenance. Two years later, US 51 was realigned to I-55, and MS 473's northern terminus remained on old US 51's alignment. MS 473 was temporarily removed from the state highway system in 1967, and an interchange with I-55/US 51 was built near Terry in the same year. In 1974, the route's old alignment in Copiah County became paved. By 1995, MS 473 in Hinds County was restored in the state highway system, and was also extended to I-55/US 51.

== Major intersections ==
County	Location	mi	km	Destinations	Notes
Hinds–Copiah county line		0.00	0.00	County line	Southern terminus
Hinds	Terry	4.95	7.97	I-55 / US 51 – McComb, Jackson	Northern terminus; I-55 exit 78; diamond interchange
1.000 mi = 1.609 km; 1.000 km = 0.621 mi
