= Interstate 755 =

Interstate 755 can refer to either of the following proposed roads:

- Airport Parkway (Mississippi) a proposed connector between I-55 and the airport in Jackson
- Interstate 755 (Missouri), a canceled freeway in St. Louis
