= White Oak, Smith County, Mississippi =

White Oak, Mississippi
- Unincorporated community
- Location within Mississippi Location within the United States
- Coordinates: 32°04′14″N 89°41′16″W
- Country: United States
- State: Mississippi
- County: Smith
- Elevation: 427 ft (130 m)
- Time zone: UTC-6 (Central (CST))
  - Summer (DST): UTC-5 (CDT)
- Area codes: 601 & 769
- GNIS feature ID: 695149

White Oak, also known as Gunn, is an unincorporated community in Smith County, Mississippi, United States. White Oak is located at the intersection of Mississippi Highway 18 and Mississippi Highway 541.

== History ==
White Oak is named for the nearby White Oak Creek and was first settled in the 1820s. Previously the community was known as Gunn, named for an early settler. The community was once home to two schools and a masonic lodge.

A post office operated under the name Gunn from 1884 to 1937.

In 1900, White Oak had a population of 37.

The White Oak Baptist Church was founded in November 1842.
