= Deolus W. Husband =

American composer

- Born: June 19, 1959; Raleigh, Mississippi, US
- Died: November 13, 1989 (aged 30)
- Education: University of Southern Mississippi; Manhattan School of Music
- Occupation: composer
- Partner: Edwin Alexander

Deolus W. Husband (June 19, 1959 – November 13, 1989) was an American composer.

== Biography ==
Husband was born in Raleigh, Mississippi. He attended the University of Southern Mississippi for Bachelor's degree, graduating in 1981. At the Manhattan School of Music he studied composition with John Corigliano and Ludmila Ulehla, receiving his doctorate in 1987.

Husband's partner was Edwin Alexander, a bassoonist.

== Legacy ==
Before he died, Husband became involved with the Estate Project for Artists With AIDS. After his death, Maury Newberger (Husband's representative at the Estate Project) set up The Deolus Husband Scholarship for Composition at the Manhattan School of Music.

Husband's manuscripts were donated by Newberger to the Music Division of the New York Public Library for the Performing Arts.
