= Norris, Mississippi =

- Unincorporated community
- Location within Mississippi Location within the United States
- Coordinates: 32°17′39″N 89°26′09″W
- Country: United States
- State: Mississippi
- County: Scott
- Elevation: 541 ft (165 m)
- Time zone: UTC-6 (Central (CST))
  - Summer (DST): UTC-5 (CDT)
- ZIP code: 39704
- Area code: 601
- GNIS feature ID: 694204

Norris is an unincorporated community located in Scott County, Mississippi. Norris is located along Mississippi Highway 501, approximately 5.3 miles (8.5 km) south-southeast of Forest.

== History ==
Norris was first settled in the 1840s and is named for Norris Williamson. The former Norris school was founded in 1856.

A post office operated under the name Norris from 1891 to 1931.

In 1900, Norris had a population of 21.
