= Interstate 220 (Mississippi) =

Highway in Mississippi

Interstate 220
- I-220 highlighted in red

Route information
- Auxiliary route of I-20
- Maintained by MDOT
- Length: 12 mi (19 km)
- Existed: 1981–present
- NHS: Entire route

Major junctions
- South end: I-20 / US 49 in Jackson
- US 80 / MS 18 in Jackson; US 49 in Jackson
- North end: I-55 in Ridgeland

Location
- Country: United States
- State: Mississippi
- Counties: Hinds, Madison

Highway system
- Interstate Highway System; Main; Auxiliary; Suffixed; Business; Future; Mississippi State Highway System; Interstate; US; State
← MS 198	→ MS 245

Interstate 220 (I-220) in Mississippi is a loop around Jackson that provides an Interstate connection for I-55 and I-20. The northern terminus for the route is in the suburb of Ridgeland, at exit 104 on I-55. The highway was Mississippi's first auxiliary Interstate, complete by 1981.

Traffic heading to and from the city's western side can use this route. By avoiding Downtown Jackson, it also offers a different route for those traveling from I-55 south to I-20 west and from I-20 east to I-55 north.

The southern terminus for the route is in western Jackson at I-20, exit 41. The route is 12 miles (19 km) long. Although control cities of North Jackson and West Jackson are used at the southern and northern terminuses, respectively, no control cities are used along the interior length of the route (including guide signs at interchanges). Secondary signs at the terminuses direct drivers to use the route as a shortcut to Memphis, Tennessee, and Vicksburg.

== Route description ==
I-220 begins at a directional T interchange with I-20 on the west side of Jackson. Its exits start with a partial cloverleaf interchange for US Highway 80 (US 80) west toward Clinton and east toward Pearl. As the interstate runs, it also runs concurrently with US 49 as it passes through a partial cloverleaf interchange with Clinton Boulevard and Capitol Street, a diamond interchange with Industrial Drive, and then making its way toward its own partial cloverleaf interchange with Medgar Evers Boulevard, making US-49 depart from I-220 north, and I-220 south is concurrent with US 49 south for the remainder of its route going south. I-220 north then makes its interchanges with Watkins Drive, Hanging Moss Road/Highland Colony Parkway, and then terminates at a directional T interchange with I-55 south, going past a short part of Ridgeland and back into Jackson, and north going to Grenada and Memphis, Tennessee.

== History ==
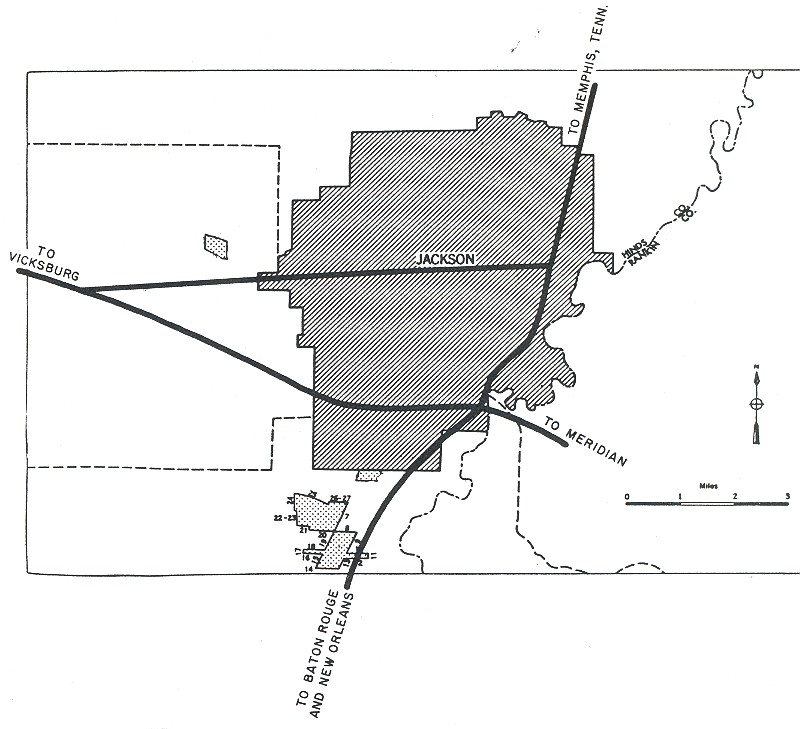
A proposed bypass around Jackson in the Yellow Book

The Interstate was first planned in 1971 and was completed by 1981.

A new interchange opened to traffic on I-220 in 2004. This $13.4-million (equivalent to $21.3 million in 2024) project completed a diamond interchange constructed at Industrial Drive between the Clinton Boulevard and US 49 north junctions. The project also resulted in the expansion of I-220 from four to six lanes from Clinton Boulevard (exits 2A and 2B) northward to Industrial Drive.

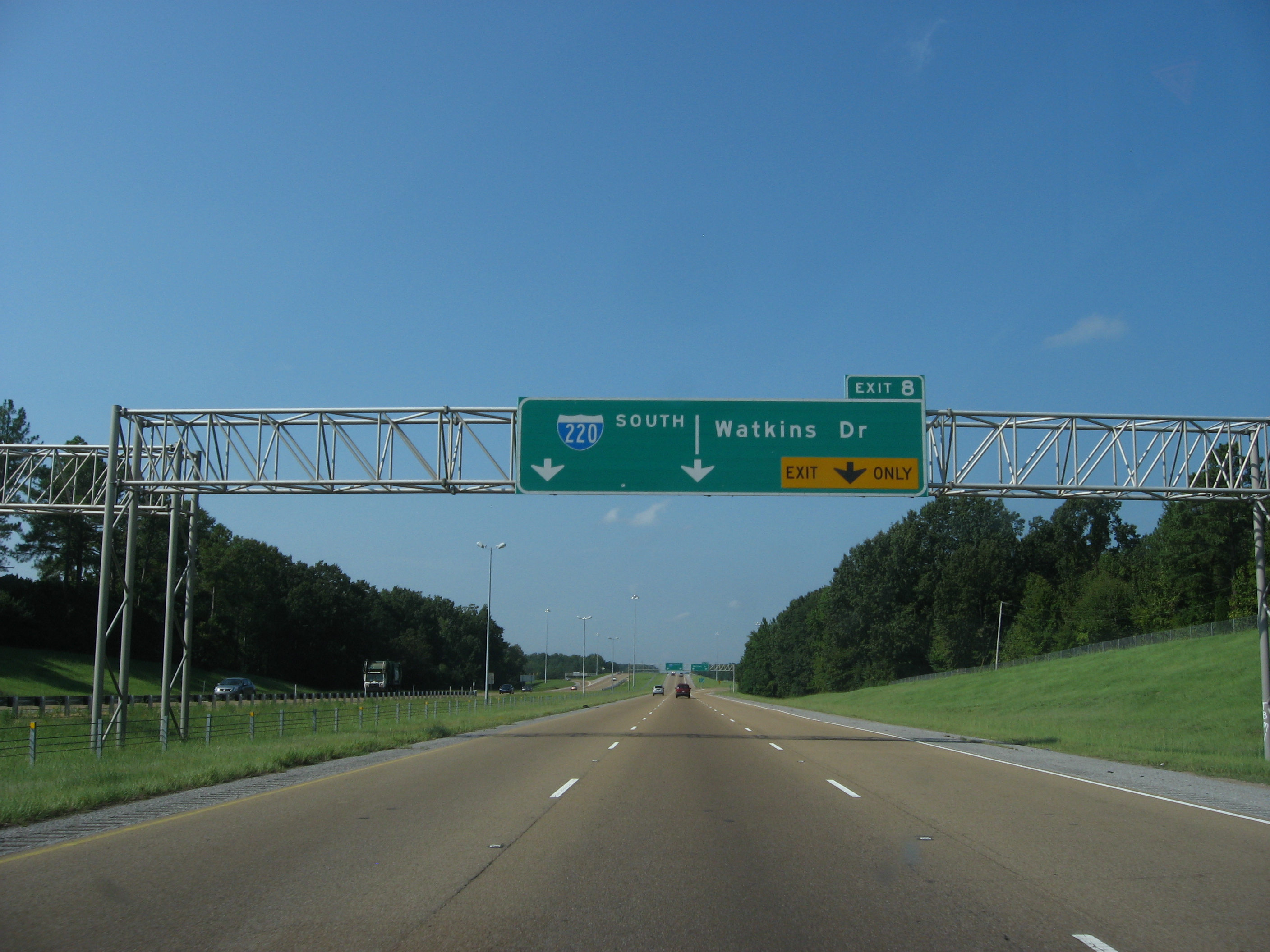
I-220 at Watkins Drive

== Exit list ==
County	Location	mi	km	Exit	Destinations	Notes
Hinds	Jackson	0.0	0.0	—	I-20 / US 49 south – Meridian, Hattiesburg, Vicksburg	Southern terminus; southern end of US 49 concurrency; directional T interchange; exit 41 on I-20
Hinds	Jackson	0.6– 1.2	0.97– 1.9	1	US 80 (MS 18)	Partial cloverleaf interchange; signed as exits 1A (east) and 1B (west)
Hinds	Jackson	2.5– 3.1	4.0– 5.0	2	Capitol Street / Clinton Boulevard	Signed as exits 2A (Capitol Street) and 2B (Clinton Blvd.) northbound
Hinds	Jackson	3.4– 4.0	5.5– 6.4	3	Industrial Drive	Diamond interchange
Hinds	Jackson	5.0– 5.6	8.0– 9.0	5	US 49 north (Medgar Evers Boulevard) – Flora, Yazoo City	Partial cloverleaf interchange; signed as exits 5A (south) and 5B (north); northern end of US 49 concurrency
Hinds	Jackson	8.2– 8.7	13.2– 14.0	8	Watkins Drive	Diamond interchange
Hinds	Jackson	9.1– 9.6	14.6– 15.4	9	Hanging Moss Road / Highland Colony Parkway	Diamond interchange
Madison	Ridgeland	11.4	18.3	—	I-55 south – Jackson	Northbound exit and southbound entrance; exit 104 on I-55
Madison	Ridgeland	12.0	19.3	—	I-55 north – Grenada, Memphis	Northern terminus
1.000 mi = 1.609 km; 1.000 km = 0.621 mi: Concurrency terminus
