= Teresa Renkenberger =

American social worker

Teresa Renkenberger is an American community leader. She is from Flowood, Mississippi and created a mobile shower truck for homeless people in the Jackson, Mississippi area. The truck, which she calls "Shower Power", is a converted food truck.
