= Whitfield, Mississippi =

Whitfield, Mississippi may refer to the following places in the U.S. state of Mississippi:

- Whitfield, Jones County, Mississippi, an unincorporated community
- Whitfield, Rankin County, Mississippi, an unincorporated community
