= Hinds County, Mississippi =

County in Mississippi, United States

Hinds County
- County
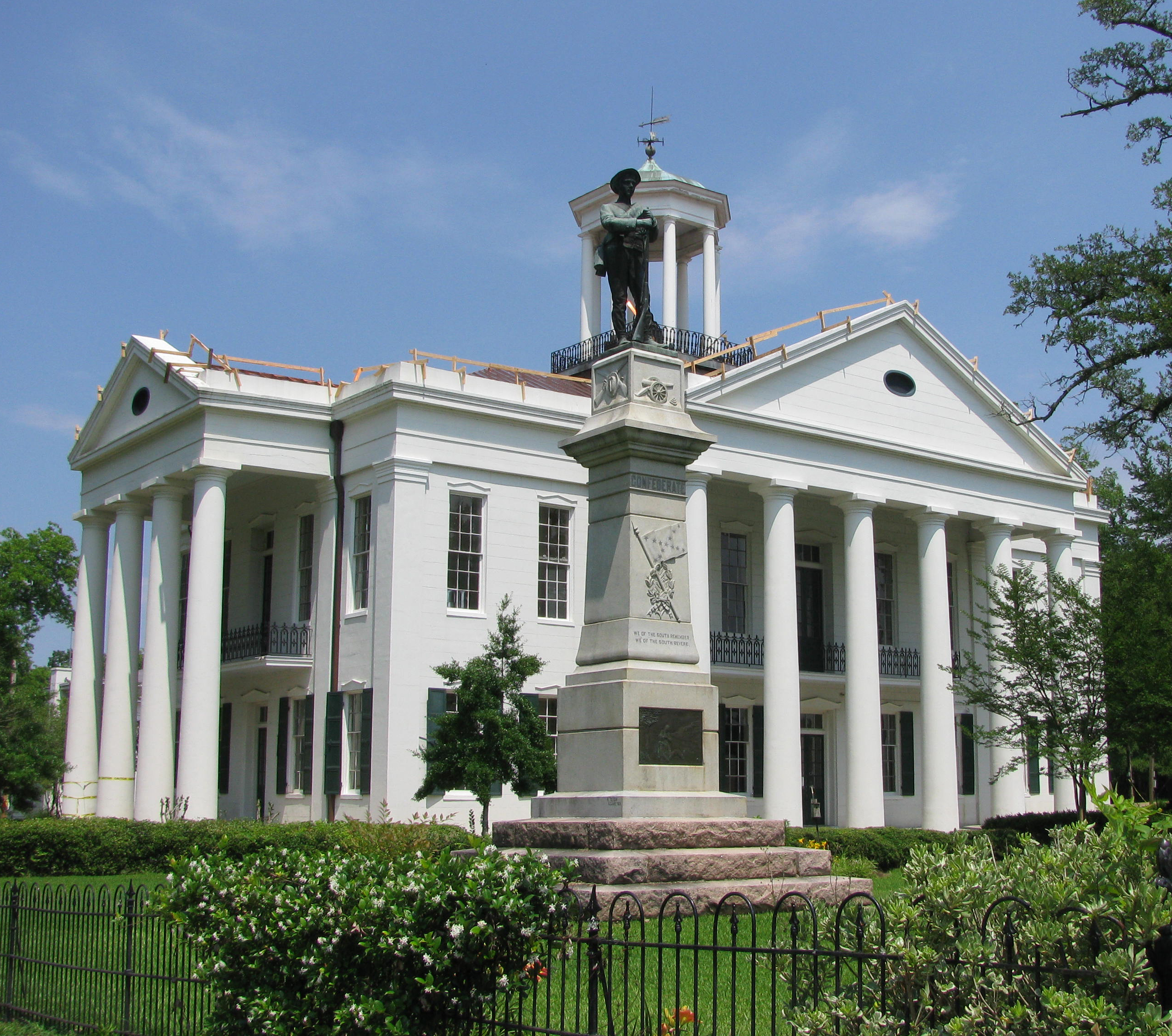
- Hinds County Courthouse and Confederate Monument in Raymond

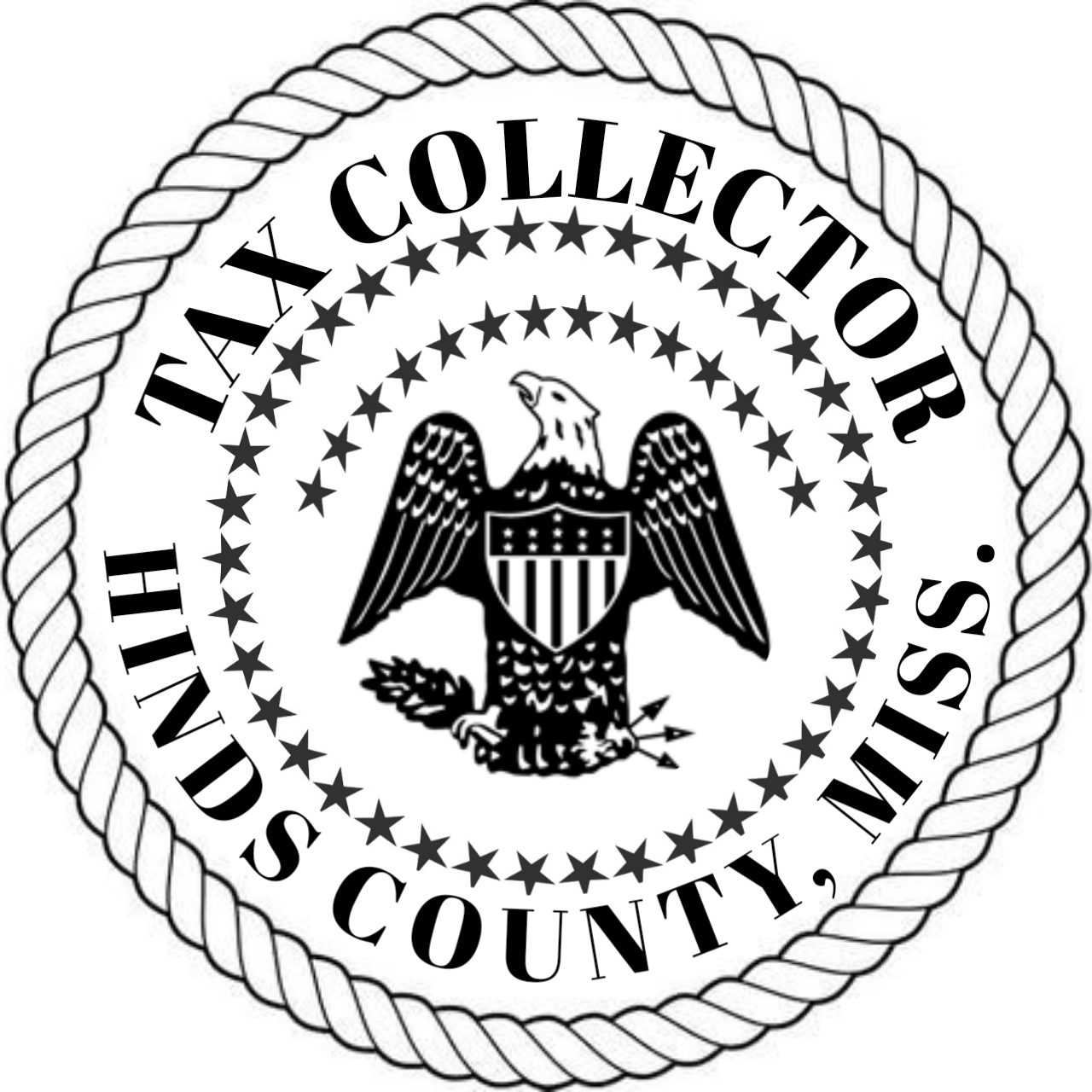
- Seal

- Location in Mississippi

- Mississippi's location within the U.S.
- Coordinates: 32.26°N 90.44°W
- Country: United States
- State: Mississippi
- Founded: 1821
- Named for: Thomas Hinds
- County seat: Jackson and Raymond
- Largest city: Jackson

Area
  - Total: 877 sq mi (2,270 km^{2})
  - Land: 870 sq mi (2,300 km^{2})
  - Water: 7.6 sq mi (20 km^{2})
  - percentage: 0.9 sq mi (2.3 km^{2})

Population (2020)
  - Total: 227,742
  - Estimate (2025): 211,888 ▼
  - Rank: MS: 1st US: 321st
  - Density: 260/sq mi (100/km^{2})
- Time zone: UTC−6 (Central (CST))
  - Summer (DST): UTC−5 (CDT)
- Area code: 601, 769
- Congressional districts: 2nd, 3rd
- Website: Official website

Hinds County is a county located in the U.S. state of Mississippi. With its county seats (Raymond and the state's capital, Jackson), Hinds is the most populous county in Mississippi with a 2020 census population of 227,742 residents. Hinds County is a central part of the Jackson metropolitan statistical area. It is a professional, educational, business and industrial hub in the state. It is bordered on the northwest by the Big Black River and on the east by the Pearl River. It is one county width away from the Yazoo River and the southern border of the Mississippi Delta.

In the 19th century, the rural areas of the county were devoted to cotton plantations worked by enslaved African Americans and depended on agriculture well into the 20th century; from 1877 to 1950, this county had 22 lynchings, the highest number in the state. Mississippi has the highest total number of lynchings of any state.

== Etymology ==
The county is named for General Thomas Hinds, a hero of the Battle of New Orleans during the War of 1812.

== Geography ==
According to the United States Census Bureau, the county has a total area of 877 square miles (2,270 km^{2}), of which 870 square miles (2,300 km^{2}) is land and 7.6 square miles (20 km^{2}) (0.9%) is water. It is the third-largest county in Mississippi by land area and fifth-largest by total area.

=== Adjacent counties ===
- Madison County (northeast)
- Rankin County (east)
- Copiah County (south)
- Claiborne County (southwest)
- Warren County (west)
- Yazoo County (northwest)

=== National protected area ===
- Natchez Trace Parkway (part)

== Transportation ==
=== Major highways ===
- I-20
- I-55
- I-220
- US 49
- US 51
- US 80
- MS 18
- MS 22
- MS 25
- MS 27
- MS 467
- MS 473
- MS 476
- Natchez Trace Parkway

=== Airports ===
The following public-use airports are located in Hinds County:

- Hawkins Field (HKS) in Jackson
- John Bell Williams Airport (JVW) in Raymond

== Demographics ==
Historical population
Census	Pop.	Note	%±
1830	8,645		—
1840	19,098		120.9%
1850	25,340		32.7%
1860	31,339		23.7%
1870	30,488		−2.7%
1880	43,958		44.2%
1890	39,279		−10.6%
1900	52,577		33.9%
1910	63,726		21.2%
1920	57,110		−10.4%
1930	85,118		49.0%
1940	107,273		26.0%
1950	142,164		32.5%
1960	187,045		31.6%
1970	214,973		14.9%
1980	250,998		16.8%
1990	254,441		1.4%
2000	250,800		−1.4%
2010	245,285		−2.2%
2020	227,742		−7.2%
2025 (est.)	211,888	▼	−7.0%
U.S. Decennial Census; 1790–1960 1900–1990; 1990–2000 2010–2020

With a population of 8,645 at the 1830 census, the county's population has experienced growth to an initial historic high of 250,000 in 1980; its second historic high was 254,441 at the 1990 census. Since then, its population has fluctuated to 250,800 in 2000 and 245,285 in 2010.

=== 2020 census ===
As of the 2020 census, the county had a population of 227,742. The median age was 37.7 years. 22.1% of residents were under the age of 18 and 16.1% of residents were 65 years of age or older. For every 100 females there were 89.0 males, and for every 100 females age 18 and over there were 85.0 males age 18 and over.

The racial makeup of the county was 25.8% White, 69.4% Black or African American, 0.2% American Indian and Alaska Native, 1.0% Asian, <0.1% Native Hawaiian and Pacific Islander, 1.2% from some other race, and 2.5% from two or more races. Hispanic or Latino residents of any race comprised 2.0% of the population.

82.4% of residents lived in urban areas, while 17.6% lived in rural areas.

There were 92,774 households in the county, of which 28.4% had children under the age of 18 living in them. Of all households, 30.2% were married-couple households, 23.1% were households with a male householder and no spouse or partner present, and 41.2% were households with a female householder and no spouse or partner present. About 36.7% of all households were made up of individuals and 12.5% had someone living alone who was 65 years of age or older.

There were 106,134 housing units, of which 12.6% were vacant. Among occupied housing units, 58.1% were owner-occupied and 41.9% were renter-occupied. The homeowner vacancy rate was 1.5% and the rental vacancy rate was 10.4%.

=== Racial and ethnic composition ===
Hinds County, Mississippi – Racial and ethnic composition Note: the US Census treats Hispanic/Latino as an ethnic category. This table excludes Latinos from the racial categories and assigns them to a separate category. Hispanics/Latinos may be of any race.
Race / Ethnicity (NH = Non-Hispanic)	Pop 1980	Pop 1990	Pop 2000	Pop 2010	Pop 2020	% 1980	% 1990	% 2000	% 2010	% 2020
White alone (NH)	135,518	122,614	92,804	68,609	58,012	53.99%	48.19%	37.00%	27.97%	25.47%
Black or African American alone (NH)	112,198	129,216	152,652	168,839	157,483	44.70%	50.78%	60.87%	68.83%	69.15%
Native American or Alaska Native alone (NH)	161	212	280	343	332	0.06%	0.08%	0.11%	0.14%	0.15%
Asian alone (NH)	721	1,216	1,493	1,851	2,157	0.29%	0.48%	0.60%	0.75%	0.95%
Native Hawaiian or Pacific Islander alone (NH)	x	x	23	29	43	x	x	0.01%	0.01%	0.02%
Other race alone (NH)	422	35	153	151	562	0.17%	0.01%	0.06%	0.06%	0.25%
Mixed race or Multiracial (NH)	x	x	1,417	1,833	4,589	x	x	0.56%	0.75%	2.01%
Hispanic or Latino (any race)	1,978	1,148	1,978	3,630	4,564	0.79%	0.45%	0.79%	1.48%	2.00%
Total	250,998	254,441	250,800	245,285	227,742	100.00%	100.00%	100.00%	100.00%	100.00%

With the trend of greater diversification in the United States leading up to and following the 2020 census, the population of non-Hispanic whites declined from 54.0% of the population in 1980 to about 25.5% of the population in 2020. Since the 1990 census, the county's population has been majority Black or African American as detailed above.

== Law enforcement ==
The Hinds County Sheriff's Department provides police services to areas of the county that are unincorporated or in municipalities that do not have their own local police force. It was founded on January 1, 1928.

Tyrone Lewis took office January 3, 2012, taking over from Malcolm E. McMillin who had held the role for 20 years. Victor Mason defeated Tyrone Lewis August 4, 2015, as Lewis sought another term. Mason went on to secure the Office November 3, 2015. Mason defeated 3 other candidates securing more than seventy percent of the vote. Victor Mason was defeated in the Democratic Primary on August 27, 2019, by Lee D. Vance. On August 4, 2021, Sheriff Lee Vance was found deceased at his home after contracting COVID-19. The current sheriff is Tyree Jones, elected November 23, 2021.

== Politics ==
Hinds County is a democratic stronghold in Mississippi. The last Republican to win the county was George H. W. Bush in his failed 1992 re-election bid.

United States presidential election results for Hinds County, Mississippi
Year	Republican		Democratic		Third party(ies)	
Year	No.	%	No.	%	No.	%
1912	40	1.80%	2,065	92.89%	118	5.31%
1916	97	4.15%	2,220	94.99%	20	0.86%
1920	151	5.54%	2,510	92.01%	67	2.46%
1924	245	5.45%	4,083	90.77%	170	3.78%
1928	976	14.60%	5,707	85.40%	0	0.00%
1932	403	5.77%	6,541	93.67%	39	0.56%
1936	313	3.49%	8,647	96.33%	16	0.18%
1940	538	5.14%	9,917	94.82%	4	0.04%
1944	962	8.42%	10,466	91.58%	0	0.00%
1948	492	3.23%	1,041	6.82%	13,722	89.95%
1952	12,520	53.38%	10,933	46.62%	0	0.00%
1956	7,015	34.59%	7,104	35.03%	6,159	30.37%
1960	11,083	38.23%	5,811	20.05%	12,094	41.72%
1964	36,831	87.93%	5,058	12.07%	0	0.00%
1968	13,488	22.21%	14,880	24.50%	32,366	53.29%
1972	49,877	77.82%	12,679	19.78%	1,540	2.40%
1976	45,803	60.46%	28,748	37.95%	1,205	1.59%
1980	48,135	53.44%	39,369	43.71%	2,570	2.85%
1984	56,953	56.69%	42,373	42.18%	1,142	1.14%
1988	52,749	55.52%	41,058	43.22%	1,199	1.26%
1992	45,031	46.90%	43,434	45.23%	7,559	7.87%
1996	35,653	42.19%	45,410	53.73%	3,446	4.08%
2000	37,753	43.01%	46,789	53.31%	3,228	3.68%
2004	36,975	39.97%	54,845	59.29%	680	0.74%
2008	32,949	30.26%	75,401	69.24%	552	0.51%
2012	29,664	27.86%	76,112	71.47%	715	0.67%
2016	25,275	26.69%	67,594	71.39%	1,812	1.91%
2020	25,141	25.14%	73,550	73.55%	1,304	1.30%
2024	22,816	26.28%	62,840	72.37%	1,174	1.35%

== Education ==
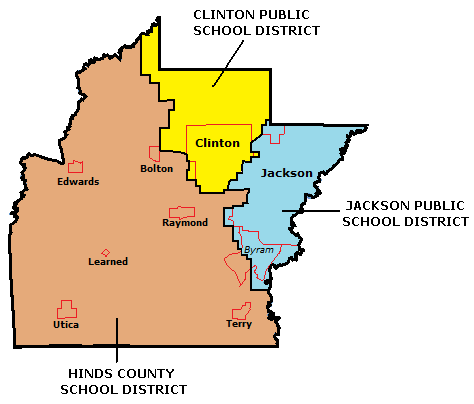
Public School Districts in Hinds County

=== Public schools ===
School districts:

- Clinton Public School District
- Hinds County School District (Raymond)
- Jackson Public School District

State-operated schools:

- Mississippi School for the Blind
- Mississippi School for the Deaf

=== Private schools ===
- Clinton Christian Academy (Clinton)
- Hillcrest Christian School (Jackson)
- Jackson Academy (Jackson)
- Mt. Salus Christian School (Clinton)
- Rebul Academy (Learned)
- Central Hinds Academy (Raymond)

=== Colleges and universities ===
- Belhaven University (Jackson)
- Hinds Community College (Raymond)
- Jackson State University (Jackson)
- Millsaps College (Jackson)
- Mississippi College (Clinton)
  - Mississippi College School of Law (Jackson)
- Reformed Theological Seminary (Jackson)
- University of Mississippi Medical Center (Jackson)
- Wesley Biblical Seminary (Jackson)

Hinds County is in the community college district of Hinds Community College.

=== Public libraries ===
- Jackson/Hinds Library System

== Communities ==
=== Cities ===
- Byram
- Clinton
- Jackson (county seat; partly in Madison and Rankin counties)
- Raymond (county seat)

=== Towns ===
- Bolton
- Edwards
- Learned
- Terry
- Utica

=== Unincorporated communities ===
- Brownsville
- Cayuga
- Cynthia
- Midway
- Oakley
- Pocahontas

== Notable people ==
- Kate Stone (1841–1907), diarist
- Henry Sloan (1870–1948), delta blues musician
- Charley Patton (1891–1934), blues musician
- Richard Durham (1917–1984), writer of the radio series Destination Freedom

== See also ==
- National Register of Historic Places listings in Hinds County, Mississippi
