= Midway, Hinds County, Mississippi =

- Unincorporated community
- Location within Mississippi Location within the United States
- Coordinates: 32°10′12″N 90°22′30″W
- Country: United States
- State: Mississippi
- County: Hinds
- Elevation: 397 ft (121 m)
- Time zone: UTC-6 (Central (CST))
  - Summer (DST): UTC-5 (CDT)
- Area codes: 601 & 769
- GNIS feature ID: 692072

Midway is an unincorporated community in Hinds County, Mississippi, United States. Midway is located on Midway Road 14.3 miles (23.0 km) southwest of Jackson and is located within the Jackson Metropolitan Statistical Area. A post office operated under the name Midway from 1869 to 1904.
