= John Bell Williams Airport =

John Bell Williams Airport (former Hinds County Airport)
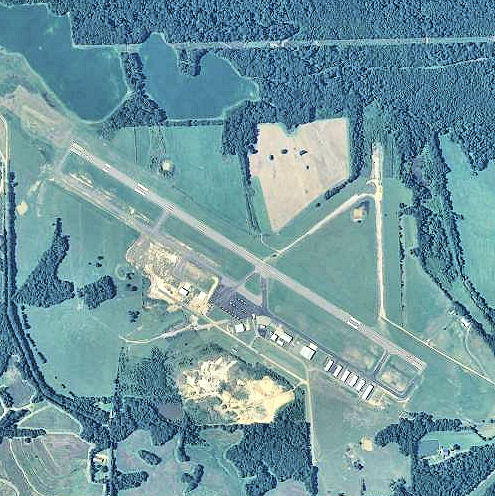
- USGS 2006 orthophoto
- IATA: none; ICAO: KJVW; FAA LID: JVW

Summary
- Airport type: Public
- Owner: Hinds Community College
- Serves: Raymond, Mississippi
- Location: Bolton, Mississippi
- Elevation AMSL: 247 ft (75 m)
- Coordinates: 32°18′16″N 090°24′38″W
- Website: www.HindsCC.edu/...

Map
- Location of airport in Mississippi JVW (the United States)

Runways
Direction	Length		Surface
Direction	ft	m	Surface
12/30	5,499	1,676	Asphalt

Statistics (2023)
- Aircraft operations (year ending 2/14/2023): 49,749
- Based aircraft: 96
- Source: Federal Aviation Administration

John Bell Williams Airport (ICAO: KJVW, FAA LID: JVW, formerly M16) is a public use airport in Hinds County, Mississippi, United States. It is located in Bolton, Mississippi, three nautical miles (6 km) northeast of the center of Raymond, Mississippi, The airport is owned by Hinds Community College.

Although many U.S. airports use the same three-letter location identifier for the FAA and IATA, this airport is assigned JVW by the FAA but has no designation from the IATA.

== History ==
During World War II, Hinds County Airport was used as an auxiliary training airfield supporting the Army pilot training school at Jackson Army Air Base. It was turned over to civil use in April 1944.

== Facilities and aircraft ==
John Bell Williams Airport covers an area of 284 acres (115 ha) at an elevation of 247 feet (75 m) above mean sea level. It has one runway designated 12/30 with an asphalt surface measuring 5,499 by 100 feet (1,676 x 30 m).

For the 12-month period ending February 14, 2023, the airport had 49,749 aircraft operations, an average of 136 per day: 98% general aviation and 2% military. At that time there were 96 aircraft based at this airport: 57 single-engine, 36 multi-engine, 1 jet, and 2 helicopters.

== See also ==
- Mississippi World War II Army Airfields
- List of airports in Mississippi
