= Interstate 55 in Mississippi =

Interstate Highway in Mississippi

Interstate 55
- I-55 highlighted in red

Route information
- Maintained by MDOT
- Length: 290.41 mi (467.37 km)
- Existed: 1955 (proposed in 1939)–present
- NHS: Entire route

Major junctions
- South end: I-55 at the Louisiana state line near Osyka
- US 98 near McComb; US 84 in Brookhaven; I-20 / US 49 in Jackson and Richland; MS 25 in Jackson; I-220 in Ridgeland; US 82 in Winona; US 278 / MS 6 in Batesville; I-69 / I-269 / MS 304 in Hernando
- North end: I-55 at the Tennessee state line in Southaven

Location
- Country: United States
- State: Mississippi
- Counties: Pike, Lincoln, Copiah, Hinds, Rankin, Madison, Yazoo, Holmes, Carroll, Montgomery, Grenada, Yalobusha, Panola, Tate, DeSoto

Highway system
- Interstate Highway System; Main; Auxiliary; Suffixed; Business; Future; Mississippi State Highway System; Interstate; US; State
← MS 53	→ MS 57

Interstate 55 (I-55) is a major north–south Interstate Highway that serves the middle of the United States. It runs 963.5 miles (1,550.6 km) from I-10 in LaPlace, Louisiana—about 25 miles (40 km) west of New Orleans—to U.S. Highway 41 (US 41) in Chicago, Illinois. In Mississippi, it runs for about 290.41 miles (467.37 km), entering the state at the Louisiana state line near Osyka and leaving at the Tennessee state line near Southaven, just south of Memphis.

== Route description ==
The highway parallels US 51 during its trek roughly through the center of the Magnolia State. North of Jackson, the Interstate runs east of the bluffs of the Mississippi Delta.

=== Louisiana to Jackson ===
The highway enters the state through Pike County and almost immediately has an interchange with MS 584. For the next few miles, there is a weigh station, rest area, and exits to Chatawa and MS 568. The freeway interchanges MS 48 near Magnolia before entering McComb. In McComb, MS 24 and US 98 interchanges I-55, with US 98 becoming concurrent with I-55 through McComb, before splitting off in Summit at a cloverleaf interchange. The interstate continues north through Pike County and eventually enters Lincoln County. I-55 has an exit leading to Bogue Chitto and soon after crosses into Brookhaven having an interchange with US 84. The route continues north for a few miles before entering Copiah County. I-55 has an exit for Wesson and an exit for MS 28 in Hazlehurst. The highway travels a few miles north and has a small interchange near Gallman. I-55 now runs along the western side of Crystal Springs before having an interchange with MS 27 and US 51, starting a concurrency with I-55 and US 51. A few miles north, the two routes enter Hinds County and quickly passes through Terry having an exit to the town. Soon after, the concurrent routes enter Byram, widening to six lanes at an interchange and soon after entering Jackson.

=== Jackson area ===
In Jackson, the highway has a few exits before becoming concurrent with I-20 east and US 49 south at a Y-shaped interchange, with US 51 continuing north as State St. Shortly after, the three routes cross the Pearl River into Rankin County, where I-55 splits off from I-20 and US 49 at a major interchange. I-55 quickly crosses the Pearl River and enters Hinds County and the city of Jackson once more. The interstates continues on the east side of Jackson as wide freeway with frequent exits, including one with MS 25 (Lakeland Dr). Eventually, the highway has an interchange with County Line Rd and enters Madison County and the city of Ridgeland. I-55 crosses over US 51 and has a T-interchange with I-220. The highway quickly passes through Ridgeland and enters Madison, where I-55 meets MS 463 at a Single-point urban interchange before shortening to a four lane interstate. The interstate has two exits in Gluckstadt. As I-55 enters Canton, the highway has a cloverleaf interchange including Collector-distributor lanes with Nissan Parkway. Shortly after, I-55 has an interchange with MS 22 (Peace St). North of Canton, the route interchanges MS 16 and quickly crosses the Big Black River into Yazoo County.

=== Central Mississippi ===
The highway travels through rural areas, having exits to Vaughan and MS 432 before entering Holmes County. Passing through thick forests, the interstate has interchanges with MS 17, MS 14, and a road leading to Holmes County State Park. The highway eventually interchanges MS 12 and has an exit to West not long after. After traveling for some miles, the route enters Carroll County. In Carroll County, I-55 continues through rural forests and has an interchange with MS 35 and MS 430 near Vaiden. Shortly after, the highway crosses into Montgomery County before entering Winona and having an interchange with US 82. I-55 quickly goes back into Carroll County to have an interchange with MS 404 and shortly after enters Grenada County. The interstate travels north for a few miles and eventually enters the city of Grenada, having an interchange with MS 8 and MS 7 where MS 7 joins I-55 in a concurrency. On the outskirts of Grenada, US 51 crosses to the west side of the interstate before MS 7 splits off at an interchange. The highway quickly enters Yalobusha County and travels through rural forests for several miles. The route interchanges MS 330 near Tillatoba and has an interchange with MS 32 outside of Oakland. Soon after, the highway runs west of Enid Lake and eventually enters Panola County

=== North Mississippi ===
The route travels north for a few miles and has an exit to Pope and Courtland. I-55 continues north through forests before entering Batesville. Here, the highway has an interchange with US 278 and MS 6 before having an interchange with MS 35 on the north side of the city. Now, the route crosses the Tallahatchie River and travels north to Sardis , where the highway interchanges MS 315. A few mile north, the interstate has an interchange with MS 310 near Como before entering Tate County. I-55 quickly enters Senatobia and has an interchange with MS 4. Soon after, the route passes through Coldwater where I-55 interchanges MS 306. A few miles ahead, the highway crosses the Coldwater River (Mississippi) into DeSoto County. The interstate travels north for several miles before entering Hernando and having an exit with MS 304 Scenic (Commerce St). North of Hernando, I-55 meets I-269 and I-69 at a cloverleaf interchange, where I-69 joins I-55 in a concurrency to the state lane. The two routes continue north to reach Southaven, where I—55/I-69 interchanges with MS 302 at a Partial cloverleaf interchange and widens to ten lanes. The two interstates travel as an urban freeway through Southaven until reaching an exit with Stateline Rd and shortly after, entering the state of Tennessee and the city of Memphis.

== History ==
I-55 in Mississippi has gone through many reconstruction projects including one that widened the highway from Siwell Road (Exit 85) in Byram to McDowell Road (Exit 92A). The project began construction in 2014 and was completed in 2018. Another major project is the reconstruction of I-55 from Old Agency Road (Exit 105B-C) to MS 463 in Madison, adding more lanes, frontage roads and a new exit to Madison Ave and Colony Park Blvd (Exit 107).

In Desoto County, there is a proposed project that will reconstruct I-55 between Southaven and Hernando, split into 3 phases. The first phase is to widen the interstate to ten lanes from Goodman Road (MS 302) and Church Road along with interchange improvements. The second phase goes from Church Road to I-269, including a new interchange with Star Landing Road, widening the highway to ten lanes. The third and final phase goes from I-269 to Commerce St. in Hernando, improving the interchange between them. The highway would be six lanes in this section. As of October 2025, there is no official estimate of when the project will start.

== Exit list ==
County	Location	mi	km	Exit	Destinations	Notes
Pike		0.00	0.00		I-55 south – Hammond, New Orleans	Continuation into Louisiana
Pike		0.79	1.27	1	MS 584 – Osyka, Gillsburg	Diamond interchange
Pike		4.49	7.23	4	Chatawa Road – Chatawa	Diamond interchange
Pike		7.79	12.54	8	MS 568 – Gillsburg, Magnolia	Diamond interchange
Pike		10.24	16.48	10	MS 48 – Magnolia	Partial cloverleaf interchange
Pike		13.29	21.39	13	Airport-Fernwood Road – Fernwood, Industrial Park	
Pike	McComb	15.44	24.85	15	US 98 east / MS 24 west – Tylertown, Liberty, South McComb	Diamond interchange; south end of US 98 overlap; Formerly signed as exits 15A (US 98) and 15B (MS 24)
Pike	McComb	17.30	27.84	17	Delaware Avenue – Downtown McComb	
Pike	McComb	18.13	29.18	18	MS 570 (Veterans Boulevard) – North McComb	
Pike	Summit	20.13	32.40	20	US 98 west – Natchez, Summit	North end of US 98 overlap; Signed as exits 20A (Summit) and 20B (US 98)
Lincoln		24.31	39.12	24	Pike County Line Road – Lake Dixie Springs, Johnstons Station	
Lincoln		29.52	47.51	30	Bogue Chitto Road – Bogue Chitto, Norfield	
Lincoln		37.66	60.61	38	US 84 – South Brookhaven, Natchez	
Lincoln	Brookhaven	40.22	64.73	40	MS 558 (Brookway Boulevard) to MS 550 – Downtown Brookhaven	
Lincoln		42.14	67.82	42	Dunn-Ratcliff Road – North Brookhaven	
Lincoln		48.25	77.65	48	Mount Zion Road	
Copiah		51.27	82.51	51	Sylvarena Road – Wesson	
Copiah		56.27	90.56	56	Tower Road – Martinsville	
Copiah		58.67	94.42	59	County Farm Road – South Hazelhurst	
Copiah		61.00	98.17	61	MS 28 – Hazelhurst, Fayette	
Copiah		64.67	104.08	65	Gallman Road – Gallman	
Copiah		67.95	109.35	68	MS 844 east (Pat Harrison Drive) – South Crystal Springs	
Copiah		71.26	114.68	72	US 51 south / MS 27 – North Crystal Springs, Utica	South end of US 51 overlap
Hinds	Terry	78.23	125.90	78	MS 473 south (Cunningham Street) / Green Gable Road – Terry	Northern terminus of MS 473
Hinds		80.58	129.68	81	Wynndale Road	
Hinds		84.53	136.04	85	Siwell Road – Byram	
Hinds	Jackson	87.71	141.16	88	Elton Road	
Hinds	Jackson	89.29	143.70	90A	Savanna Street	
Hinds	Jackson	90.02	144.87	90B	Daniel Lake Boulevard	Southbound exit and northbound entrance
Hinds	Jackson	91.14	146.68	92A	McDowell Road	
Hinds	Jackson	91.57	147.37	92C	I-20 west / US 49 north / University Boulevard – Vicksburg, Yazoo City	South end of I-20 / US 49 overlap; Northbound exit and southbound entrance; I-20 exit 44
Hinds	Jackson	92.52	148.90	45A	Gallatin Street	Northbound exit is part of exit 45; this exit gives I-55 northbound traffic a 2nd chance to get exit access to Gallatin Street
Hinds	Jackson	92.90	149.51	45B (SB); 92B (NB)	US 51 north (State Street)	North end of US 51 concurrency
Rankin	Flowood	93.56	150.57	94	I-20 east / US 49 south – Meridian, Hattiesburg To US 80 – Flowood	North end of I-20 / US 49 overlap; Southbound exit and northbound entrance; I-20 exit 46
Hinds	Jackson	95.21	153.23	96A	Pearl Street-Telcom Center, Convention Complex	Trumpet interchange
Hinds	Jackson	95.52	153.72	96B	High Street – State Capitol	Future western terminus of the proposed Airport Parkway; one-quadrant interchange
Hinds	Jackson	96.05	154.58	96C	Fortification Street	One-quadrant interchange
Hinds	Jackson	97.28	156.56	98A	Woodrow Wilson Avenue	
Hinds	Jackson	97.85	157.47	98B	MS 25 north (Lakeland Drive) – Carthage	Formerly signed as exits 98B (east) and 98C (west); partial cloverleaf interchange
Hinds	Jackson	98.98	159.29	99	Meadowbrook Road	Northbound exit and southbound entrance
Hinds	Jackson	99.51	160.15	100	Northside Drive	
Hinds	Jackson	101.24	162.93	102A	Briarwood Drive	Northbound exit and southbound entrance
Hinds	Jackson	101.59	163.49	102B	Beasley Road / Adkins Boulevard	Signed as exit 102 southbound
Hinds	Jackson	102.58	165.09	103	County Line Road - Ridgeland	
Madison	Ridgeland	103.51	166.58	104	I-220 south to I-20 west – West Jackson, Vicksburg	Northern terminus of I-220; Y interchange
Madison	Ridgeland	104.62	168.37	105A	Natchez Trace Parkway	Partial cloverleaf interchange & Two-quadrant interchange
Madison	Ridgeland	104.79	168.64	105	MS 886 east (Jackson Street) / Old Agency Road	Signed as exits 105B (Jackson Street) and 105C (Old Agency Road) northbound; partial cloverleaf interchange
Madison		106.68	171.68	107	Colony Park Boulevard / Madison Avenue	
Madison		107.66	173.26	108	MS 463 – Madison	SPUI
Madison		111.59	179.59	112	Gluckstadt Road – Gluckstadt	
Madison		113.27	182.29	114	MS 857 (Sowell Road)	Signed as 114A (east) and 114B (west) southbound
Madison		116.82	188.00	118	Nissan Parkway – South Canton	Signed as exits 118A (east) and 118B (west)
Madison	Canton	118.15	190.14	119	MS 22 – Canton, Flora	
Madison		123.51	198.77	124	MS 16 – North Canton, Yazoo City	
Yazoo		132.56	213.33	133	Vaughan Road – Vaughan	
Yazoo		138.14	222.31	139	MS 432 – Pickens, Yazoo City, Benton	
Holmes		143.17	230.41	144	MS 17 – Pickens, Lexington	
Holmes		145.74	234.55	146	MS 14 – Goodman, Ebenezer	
Holmes		149.37	240.39	150	State Park Road – Holmes County State Park	
Holmes		155.41	250.11	156	MS 12 – Durant, Lexington	
Holmes		163.85	263.69	164	Emory Road – West	
Carroll	Vaiden	173.64	279.45	174	MS 35 / MS 430 – Vaiden, Carrollton	
Montgomery	Winona	184.07	296.23	185	US 82 – Winona, Greenwood	
Carroll		194.56	313.11	195	MS 404 – Duck Hill	
Grenada		198.10	318.81	199	Nat G. Troutt Road – South Grenada	
Grenada	Grenada	205.45	330.64	206	MS 7 south / MS 8 (MS 333 Scenic) – Grenada, Greenwood	South end of MS 7 overlap
Grenada	Grenada	207.37	333.73	208	Paper Mill Road – North Grenada	
Grenada		210.77	339.20	211	MS 7 north / MS 333 Scenic – Coffeeville	North end of MS 7 overlap
Yalobusha		219.43	353.14	220	MS 330 (Tillatoba Road) – Coffeeville	
Yalobusha		225.98	363.68	227	MS 32 / MS 32 Scenic west – Oakland, Water Valley	
Yalobusha		231.72	372.92	233	MS 32 Scenic – Enid	
Panola		236.48	380.58	237	Hentz Road – Pope, Courtland	
Panola	Batesville	242.30	389.94	243	US 278 / MS 6 – Oxford, Batesville	formerly signed as exits 243A-B
Panola	Batesville	245.15	394.53	246	MS 35 / MS 315 Scenic north – North Batesville	
Panola	Sardis	251.18	404.24	252	MS 315 / MS 315 Scenic south – Sardis, Sardis Dam	
Panola		256.43	412.68	257	MS 310 – Como	
Tate	Senatobia	262.00	421.65	263	MS 740 – South Senatobia	
Tate	Senatobia	264.19	425.17	265	MS 4 – Holly Springs, Senatobia	
Tate	Coldwater	269.86	434.30	271	MS 306 (MS 304 Scenic) – Independence, Coldwater	Counterclockwise terminus of MS 304 Scenic
DeSoto	Hernando	278.50	448.20	280	MS 304 Scenic west (Commerce Street) – Hernando, Arkabutla Lake	Clockwise terminus of MS 304 Scenic; former MS 304
DeSoto	Hernando	281.24	452.61	283	I-69 south / I-269 north / MS 304 – Tunica, Casinos	Signed as exits 283A (north) and 283B (south); south end of I-69 overlap; southern terminus of I-269
DeSoto	Hernando	282.74	455.03	284	Nesbit Road / Pleasant Hill Road - North Hernando	
DeSoto	Southaven	286.22	460.63	287	Church Road –Southaven, Horn Lake	
DeSoto	Southaven	288.26	463.91	289	MS 302 (Goodman Road) – Southaven, Horn Lake, Olive Branch	
Mississippi–Tennessee line		290.51	467.53	291	Southaven	Access via Main Street/Stateline Road
Mississippi–Tennessee line		290.51	467.53		I-55 north – Memphis I-69 ends	Continuation into Tennessee; current northern terminus of I-69
1.000 mi = 1.609 km; 1.000 km = 0.621 mi: Concurrency terminus; Incomplete access

Interstate 55
Previous state: Louisiana	Mississippi	Next state: Tennessee
