= Mississippi State Hospital =

Geography
- Location: Whitfield, Rankin County, Mississippi, United States
- Coordinates: 32.242526°N 90.070705°W

Organization
- Type: Psychiatric hospital

History
- Opened: 1935

Links
- Lists: Hospitals in Mississippi

The Mississippi State Hospital (MSH) is a psychiatric facility operated by the Mississippi Department of Mental Health. It is located along Mississippi Highway 468 in the unincorporated community of Whitfield in Rankin County, Mississippi, United States. The 350-acre (140 ha) campus is located 15 miles (24 km) southeast of Jackson, between Jackson and Brandon. Many people refer to the center as "Whitfield," after the community in which it is located.

== History ==
In 1846, Mississippi governor A. G. Brown promoted the need for an insane asylum to the state legislature.

In 1920, the state hospital was located in Jackson and had 1,670 residents. In 1930, it had 2,649 residents. In 1935, the Mississippi State Insane Asylum moved from a complex of 19th-century buildings in northern Jackson to its current location, the former property of a state penal colony, the Rankin Farm.

MSH became overcrowded. It held people with severe mental illness, as well as people suffering from alcoholism, depression, menopause, and other ailments that have been resolved with modern medicine in later generations.

In the 1930s, the facility consisted of 3,500 acres (1,400 ha) acres of farmland, including 1,500 acres (610 ha) cultivated acres. MSH was a self-sufficient facility, with its own bakery, dairy, laundry, post office, tuberculosis hospital, and water wells. Hunter Cole, author of The Legs Murder Scandal, said that in the 1930s, MSH appeared "more like an estate than a prison" due to the fields, meadows, and woodlands in the area. Arrington High, a black man protesting segregationist activities in Mississippi, was confined there in 1957 for 5 months before escaping. During the time MSH had many Mount Vernon style buildings. A lake was created in front of the main buildings.

Before desegregation, MSH was segregated. White patients resided on the east side of the campus and African-American patients resided on the west side of the campus. Each group had its own group of facilities including chapels, dining halls, recreational facilities, and tuberculosis sanatoria. In 1935, 3,000 residents and 475 employees lived in the facility.

== Facilities ==
Children from age four to 17 years and 11 months who require acute, short-term treatment are treated at the Oak Circle Center (OCC). MSH also has the Chemical Dependency Unit (CDU) to treat people who have alcohol and/or drug addictions.

The Lakeside School at MSH provides educational services. The state hospital includes the Jacquith Nursing Home. The United States Postal Service Whitfield Post Office is located on the property of MSH. Staff housing is provided by MSH.
