= Airport Parkway (Mississippi) =

Proposed highway in Mississippi

Route information
- History: Approved: 2008; Original completion: 2012; 2nd funding request: 2023

Major junctions
- From: Interstate 55 (Jackson)
- To: Jackson-Evers International Airport

Location
- Country: United States
- States: Mississippi

Highway system

The Airport Parkway is a proposed major highway development project in the Jackson, Mississippi, metropolitan area that will connect Interstate 55 (I-55) in downtown Jackson to the Jackson-Evers International Airport. Approved in 2008, it was originally projected to be completed in 2012, but no construction has commenced as of 2023. A request to fund the rest of the planning for the route was made in 2023.

== Route description ==
The parkway will begin at Interstate 55 (I-55) at the High Street exit in downtown Jackson. It will then travel eastward for 12-mile (19 km), crossing the Pearl River and passing through the north side of Pearl before diverging at MS 477 at the Jackson-Evers International Airport in Flowood. The northern segment will terminate at Mississippi Highway 25 (MS 25; Lakeland Drive) north of the airport while the southern segment will terminate at MS 475 (Airport Road) south of the airport. The entire road is planned to be operated as a toll road.

== History ==
The Airport Parkway Commission that was formed in 1995 to help advance the project consists of the mayors of Pearl, Flowood, and Jackson, the three cities through which the Airport Parkway would run. The U.S. Congress allocated $35 million for the project. The environmental impact statement was completed in 1999. Right-of-way acquisition for the portion of the project in Rankin County (about 40% of the total right-of-way requirement) was completed at a cost of $15 million. In December 2007, the total cost to complete the project was estimated at about $400 million, but construction has yet to begin.

== Future ==
In 2023, Mississippi Senator Roger Wicker requested $13.12 million for the 2024 fiscal year to fund the remaining right-of-way acquisition, design, and update the environmental information documents for the Airport Parkway Corridor. A timeline for this has not been established.
