= Sylvarena, Mississippi =

- Village
- Location of Sylvarena, Mississippi

- Location in the United States
- Coordinates: 32°0′38″N 89°22′56″W
- Country: United States
- State: Mississippi
- County: Smith

Area
  - Total: 2.62 sq mi (6.78 km^{2})
  - Land: 2.62 sq mi (6.78 km^{2})
  - Water: 0 sq mi (0.00 km^{2})
- Elevation: 364 ft (111 m)

Population (2020)
  - Total: 87
  - Density: 33.2/sq mi (12.83/km^{2})
- Time zone: UTC-6 (Central (CST))
  - Summer (DST): UTC-5 (CDT)
- ZIP code: 39153
- Area code: 601
- FIPS code: 28-72040
- GNIS feature ID: 0694923

Sylvarena is a village in Smith County, Mississippi. As of the 2020 census, Sylvarena had a population of 87.

== History ==
Sylvarena was incorporated in 1884.

A post office operated under the name Sylvarena from 1869 to 1987.

In 1900, Sylvarena had a population of 75, two churches, and a school, the Sylvarena Institute.

== Geography ==
Sylvarena is located at 32°0′38″N 89°22′56″W (32.010575, -89.382148).

According to the United States Census Bureau, the village has a total area of 2.6 square miles (6.7 km^{2}), all land.

== Demographics ==
Historical population
Census	Pop.	Note	%±
1950	112		—
1960	69		−38.4%
1970	115		66.7%
1980	102		−11.3%
1990	110		7.8%
2000	120		9.1%
2010	112		−6.7%
2020	87		−22.3%
U.S. Decennial Census

As of the census of 2000, there were 120 people, 50 households, and 41 families residing in the village. The population density was 46.3 inhabitants per square mile (17.9/km^{2}). There were 53 housing units at an average density of 20.4 per square mile (7.9/km^{2}). The racial makeup of the village was 93.33% White, 1.67% African American, 3.33% Native American, and 1.67% from two or more races.

There were 50 households, out of which 30.0% had children under the age of 18 living with them, 60.0% were married couples living together, 16.0% had a female householder with no husband present, and 18.0% were non-families. 14.0% of all households were made up of individuals, and 6.0% had someone living alone who was 65 years of age or older. The average household size was 2.40 and the average family size was 2.63.

In the village, the population was spread out, with 20.0% under the age of 18, 9.2% from 18 to 24, 29.2% from 25 to 44, 20.8% from 45 to 64, and 20.8% who were 65 years of age or older. The median age was 38 years. For every 100 females, there were 81.8 males. For every 100 females age 18 and over, there were 81.1 males.

The median income for a household in the village was $24,375, and the median income for a family was $25,750. Males had a median income of $28,750 versus $20,750 for females. The per capita income for the village was $29,869. There were 10.8% of families and 21.4% of the population living below the poverty line, including 42.9% of under eighteens and 8.3% of those over 64.

== Education ==
The Village of Sylvarena is served by the Smith County School District.

== In popular culture ==
Season 2, Episode 3 of MTV's Rob & Big is set in Sylvarena.
