= Greenfield, Mississippi =

- Unincorporated community
- Location within the state of Mississippi
- Coordinates: 32°14′58″N 90°03′10″W
- Country: United States
- State: Mississippi
- County: Rankin
- Elevation: 312 ft (95 m)
- Time zone: UTC-6 (Central (CST))
  - Summer (DST): UTC-5 (CDT)
- ZIP codes: 39208, 39042
- Area codes: 601 & 769
- GNIS feature ID: 691907

Greenfield (also Green) is an unincorporated community in Rankin County, Mississippi, United States.

The settlement is named for S. Green, an early settler. Greenfield had a post office from 1891 to 1935.

An early railway line, owned by the Jackson & Brandon Railroad & Bridge Company, was built through Greenfield in the 1830s. The line is currently owned by the Kansas City Southern Railway.
