= Puckett, Mississippi =

- Village
- Location of Puckett, Mississippi

- Location in the United States
- Coordinates: 32°4′59″N 89°46′40″W
- Country: United States
- State: Mississippi
- County: Rankin

Government
  - Type: Mayor, Aldermen
  - Mayor: Russ Espiritu

Area
  - Total: 2.88 sq mi (7.47 km^{2})
  - Land: 2.88 sq mi (7.45 km^{2})
  - Water: 0.0077 sq mi (0.02 km^{2})
- Elevation: 341 ft (104 m)

Population (2020)
  - Total: 342
  - Density: 118.9/sq mi (45.89/km^{2})
- Time zone: UTC-6 (Central (CST))
  - Summer (DST): UTC-5 (CDT)
- ZIP codes: 39151, 39042
- Area code: 601
- FIPS code: 28-60360
- GNIS feature ID: 0676410
- Website: http://www.puckettms.org

Puckett is a village in Rankin County, Mississippi, United States. According to the 2020 census, the population was 342. It is part of the Jackson Metropolitan Statistical Area.

== History ==
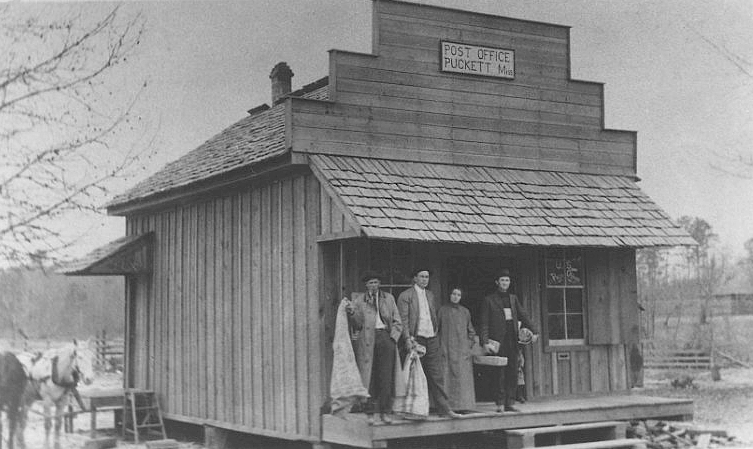
Post office (1912)

The first European-American settlement at this location was in 1837, and the pioneers named it Clear Creek. One of the first settlers was Calvin Boone. A man known by the surname Merchant is credited with building the first water mill in the area, and with blazing a road along a ridge leading to another settlement then known as Shiloh. Settlers migrated from Alabama. A.A. Burnham applied for a US post office in 1890, asking that it be named either Clear Creek or Burnham. Due to these names already being used, the USPS assigned the name of Puckett to the post office, after the Puckett family, who came from nearby Tishomingo. Early in the town's history, a traveling show wintered there for a number of years. Attendance at its winter performances led to the town's being nicknamed "the largest little show place in the world". In the 1950s a sign was erected, saying "Welcome to Puckett 300 good friendly folks and a few old sore heads".

== Geography ==
According to the United States Census Bureau, the village has a total area of 2.0 square miles (5.2 km^{2}), of which 2.0 square miles (5.2 km^{2}) is land and 0.50% is water.

== Demographics ==
Historical population
Census	Pop.	Note	%±
1960	302		—
1970	333		10.3%
1980	279		−16.2%
1990	294		5.4%
2000	354		20.4%
2010	316		−10.7%
2020	342		8.2%
U.S. Decennial Census; 2010 2020

=== 2020 census ===
Puckett village, Mississippi – Demographic Profile (NH = Non-Hispanic)
Race / Ethnicity	Pop 2010	Pop 2020	% 2010	% 2020
White alone (NH)	311	311	98.42%	90.94%
Black or African American alone (NH)	1	15	0.32%	4.39%
Native American or Alaska Native alone (NH)	0	0	0.00%	0.00%
Asian alone (NH)	1	1	0.32%	0.29%
Pacific Islander alone (NH)	0	0	0.00%	0.00%
Some Other Race alone (NH)	0	0	0.00%	0.00%
Mixed Race/Multi-Racial (NH)	1	13	0.32%	3.80%
Hispanic or Latino (any race)	2	2	0.63%	0.58%
Total	316	342	100.00%	100.00%

Note: the US Census treats Hispanic/Latino as an ethnic category. This table excludes Latinos from the racial categories and assigns them to a separate category. Hispanics/Latinos can be of any race.

=== 2000 Census ===
As of the census of 2000, there were 354 people, 136 households, and 110 families residing in the village. The population density was 175.6 inhabitants per square mile (67.8/km^{2}). There were 151 housing units at an average density of 74.9 per square mile (28.9/km^{2}). The racial makeup of the village was 96.33% White, 2.82% African American, and 0.85% from two or more races.

There were 136 households, out of which 39.7% had children under the age of 18 living with them, 66.2% were married couples living together, 11.8% had a female householder with no husband present, and 19.1% were non-families. 18.4% of all households were made up of individuals, and 11.0% had someone living alone who was 65 years of age or older. The average household size was 2.60 and the average family size was 2.91.

In the village, the population was spread out, with 28.5% under the age of 18, 3.1% from 18 to 24, 28.5% from 25 to 44, 27.7% from 45 to 64, and 12.1% who were 65 years of age or older. The median age was 37 years. For every 100 females, there were 89.3 males. For every 100 females age 18 and over, there were 83.3 males.

The median income for a household in the village was $36,625, and the median income for a family was $41,000. Males had a median income of $30,179 versus $21,458 for females. The per capita income for the village was $13,909. About 11.5% of families and 10.8% of the population were below the poverty line, including 4.5% of those under age 18 and 18.8% of those age 65 or over.

== Education ==
Puckett became the educational center of South Rankin in the early 20th century. The town of Puckett is served by the Rankin County School District.

=== Public schools ===
- Puckett Attendance Center (grades K–12)

=== Sports ===
The Puckett Wolves advanced to the MHSAA 1-A Football Championship in 2002 and 2006–2008, winning the championship in 2002, 2006 & 2008.
