= Raleigh, Mississippi =

- Town
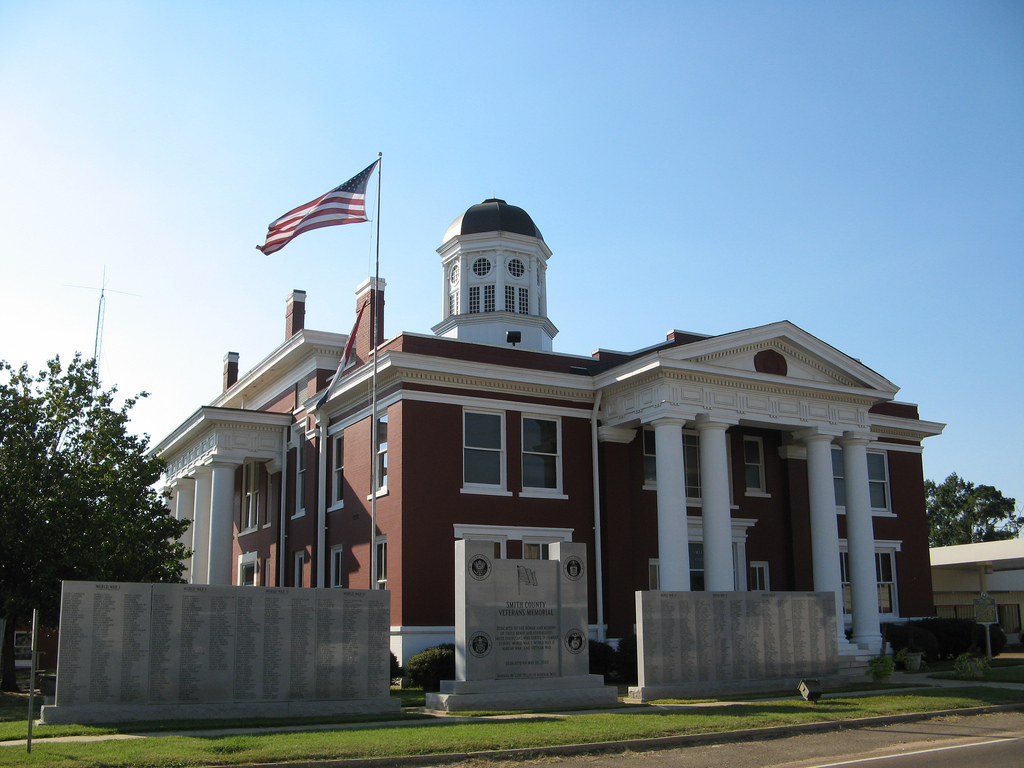
- Smith County Courthouse in Raleigh

- Location of Raleigh, Mississippi

- Location in the United States
- Coordinates: 32°1′59″N 89°31′22″W
- Country: United States
- State: Mississippi
- County: Smith

Area
  - Total: 5.11 sq mi (13.23 km^{2})
  - Land: 5.10 sq mi (13.20 km^{2})
  - Water: 0.012 sq mi (0.03 km^{2})
- Elevation: 545 ft (166 m)

Population (2020)
  - Total: 1,094
  - Density: 214.7/sq mi (82.89/km^{2})
- Time zone: UTC-6 (Central (CST))
  - Summer (DST): UTC-5 (CDT)
- ZIP code: 39153
- Area code: 601
- FIPS code: 28-60840
- GNIS feature ID: 0694503

Raleigh is a town in and the county seat of Smith County, Mississippi, United States. The population was 1,094 at the 2020 census. Named for English explorer Sir Walter Raleigh, Raleigh has been home to such Mississippians as Governor Robert Lowry, Governor/U.S. Senator Anselm McLaurin and pioneer William H. Hardy.

== History ==
Raleigh was first established as the community of Indian Springs and was renamed when the county seat was moved from Fairfield to Raleigh in 1834. The town of Raleigh and its citizens were very active in the Civil War; it was home to numerous companies of the Army of Mississippi and a training camp. In 1863, Raleigh was part of Grierson's Raid which played a major role in the defeat of the Confederate Army at Vicksburg.

== Geography ==
Raleigh is located at 32°1′59″N 89°31′22″W (32.033008, -89.522893).

According to the United States Census Bureau, the town has a total area of 5.1 square miles (13 km^{2}), of which 5.0 square miles (13 km^{2}) is land and 0.04 square miles (0.10 km^{2}) (0.40%) is water.

Raleigh's tornado activity is slightly above the state's average and 187% above the national average.

== Demographics ==
Historical population
Census	Pop.	Note	%±
1940	644		—
1950	580		−9.9%
1960	614		5.9%
1970	1,018		65.8%
1980	998		−2.0%
1990	1,291		29.4%
2000	1,255		−2.8%
2010	1,462		16.5%
2020	1,094		−25.2%
U.S. Decennial Census

=== 2020 census ===
Raleigh racial composition
Race	Num.	Perc.
White (non-Hispanic)	662	60.51%
Black or African American (non-Hispanic)	394	36.01%
Native American	4	0.37%
Asian	3	0.27%
Other/Mixed	18	1.65%
Hispanic or Latino	13	1.19%

As of the 2020 United States census, there were 1,094 people, 435 households, and 255 families residing in the town.

=== 2000 census ===
At the 2000 census, there were 1,255 people, 482 households and 334 families residing in the town. The population density was 249.0 inhabitants per square mile (96.1/km^{2}). There were 550 housing units at an average density of 109.1 per square mile (42.1/km^{2}). The racial makeup of the town was 59.76% White, 39.68% African American, 0.08% Native American, 0.32% from other races, and 0.16% from two or more races. Hispanic or Latino of any race were 0.64% of the population. 4% of the population claim German descent and 9% claim Irish descent.

There were 482 households, of which 34.0% had children under the age of 18 living with them, 51.0% were married couples living together, 14.5% had a female householder with no husband present, and 30.7% were non-families. 28.6% of all households were made up of individuals, and 15.6% had someone living alone who was 65 years of age or older. The average household size was 2.56 and the average family size was 3.17.

27.7% of the population were under the age of 18, 8.2% from 18 to 24, 26.6% from 25 to 44, 23.4% from 45 to 64, and 14.0% who were 65 years of age or older. The median age was 35 years. For every 100 females, there were 83.5 males. For every 100 females age 18 and over, there were 80.0 males.

The median household income was $26,316 and the median family income was $31,458. Males had a median income of $28,646 versus $16,417 for females. The per capita income for the town was $13,982. About 18.9% of families and 24.2% of the population were below the poverty line, including 32.1% of those under age 18 and 25.7% of those age 65 or over.

== Arts and culture ==
Raleigh is the site of the annual Raleigh heritage festival and is the former home of The National Tobacco Spitting Contest.

=== Landmarks ===
The Harrison Hotel, now closed, is a famous hotel. Many Mississippi politicians, governors and U.S. Senators have stayed there, including Theodore G. Bilbo and Jefferson Davis.

The Smith County Courthouse is the major focal point of the town. Two earlier courthouses were destroyed in fires in the 1800s. The current court house was completed in 1912; but a leak in the roof caused the eventual loss of its signature dome. In 2005, a dedication service was held in honor of a new dome built as a replacement.

A new Chancery Court building was completed in 2009 to make room for county offices and added court room space. The new Chancery Court building is designed in a similar Greek revival design which resembles the County Courthouse.

== Education ==
Raleigh is served by the Smith County School District, the only school district in the county.

Raleigh High School is the educational center for the towns of Raleigh, Polkville and Sylvarena. Its school colors are maroon and white. Its mascot is Rah-Lee the Lion.

The county is in the zone for Jones College.

== Notable people ==
- Jamie Bender, former professional football player
- Christopher "Big Black" Boykin, American entertainer and musician
- Bobby Keyes, Professional American, Canadian defensive back Edmonton Eskimos CFL
- Woodrow Hamilton, former National Football League player
- Deolus W. Husband, composer
- Y C McNease, former college football head coach
- Donte Moncrief, (American Football) Wide Receiver Houston Texans
- Suntarine Perkins, college football linebacker
- Mark Tullos, lawyer and current state representative
