= Whitfield, Rankin County, Mississippi =

Whitfield, Mississippi
- Unincorporated community
- Location within Mississippi Location within the United States
- Coordinates: 32°14′08″N 90°04′19″W
- Country: United States
- State: Mississippi
- County: Rankin
- Elevation: 308 ft (94 m)
- Time zone: UTC-6 (Central (CST))
  - Summer (DST): UTC-5 (CDT)
- ZIP code: 39193
- Area codes: 601 & 769
- GNIS feature ID: 679643

Whitfield is an unincorporated community located in Rankin County, Mississippi, United States. The zip code is: 39193. The Mississippi State Hospital is located in Whitfield.
