= Flowood, Mississippi =

Flowood
- City
- Location of Flowood, Mississippi

- Location in the United States
- Coordinates: 32°19′0″N 90°6′53″W
- Country: United States
- State: Mississippi
- County: Rankin

Government
  - Type: Mayor-Council
  - Mayor: Kathy Smith (R)
  - Board of Aldermen: Deron Harmon; Kimberly Buford; Kirk McDaniel; Seth Robbins; Donald Flynt

Area
  - Total: 29.20 sq mi (75.62 km^{2})
  - Land: 28.80 sq mi (74.59 km^{2})
  - Water: 0.40 sq mi (1.03 km^{2})
- Elevation: 269 ft (82 m)

Population (2020)
  - Total: 10,202
  - Density: 354.3/sq mi (136.78/km^{2})
- Time zone: UTC-6 (Central (CST))
  - Summer (DST): UTC-5 (CDT)
- ZIP codes: 39232 (Flowood); 39047 (Brandon)
- Area codes: 601, 769
- FIPS code: 28-25100
- GNIS feature ID: 0670061
- Website: www.cityofflowood.com

Flowood is a city in Rankin County, Mississippi, United States. The population was 10,202 as of the 2020 census. A suburb of Jackson, Flowood is part of the Jackson Metropolitan Statistical Area, and is located northeast of the state capital.

== History ==
In 1950, a delegation from Flowood petitioned Governor Fielding L. Wright to incorporate the community. Despite opposition, Flowood's incorporation was upheld by the Mississippi Supreme Court in 1953.

In June 2009, Flowood voters approved (by a 75% to 25% margin) being classified as a resort area that allows liquor by the glass in restaurants and hotels, coming out from under a dry county.

== Geography ==
According to the United States Census Bureau, the city has a total area of 16.6 square miles (43 km^{2}), of which 16.3 square miles (42 km^{2}) is land and 0.3 square miles (0.78 km^{2}) (1.69%) is water.

== Demographics ==
Historical population
Census	Pop.	Note	%±
1960	486		—
1970	352		−27.6%
1980	943		167.9%
1990	2,860		203.3%
2000	4,750		66.1%
2010	7,823		64.7%
2020	10,202		30.4%
U.S. Decennial Census

=== 2020 census ===
As of the 2020 census, Flowood had a population of 10,202. The median age was 36.4 years. 20.5% of residents were under the age of 18 and 14.6% of residents were 65 years of age or older. For every 100 females, there were 86.1 males, and for every 100 females age 18 and over there were 82.1 males age 18 and over.

89.6% of residents lived in urban areas, while 10.4% lived in rural areas.

There were 4,490 households in Flowood, including 2,338 families. Of all households, 28.1% had children under the age of 18 living in them. Of all households, 43.9% were married-couple households, 19.8% were households with a male householder and no spouse or partner present, and 32.1% were households with a female householder and no spouse or partner present. About 35.6% of all households were made up of individuals and 9.2% had someone living alone who was 65 years of age or older.

There were 4,748 housing units, of which 5.4% were vacant. The homeowner vacancy rate was 1.8% and the rental vacancy rate was 5.9%.

Flowood racial composition
Race	Num.	Perc.
White (non-Hispanic)	6,844	67.08%
Black or African American (non-Hispanic)	2,133	20.91%
Native American	17	0.17%
Asian	620	6.08%
Other/Mixed	284	2.78%
Hispanic or Latino	304	2.98%

=== 2000 census ===
As of the census of 2000, there were 4,750 people, 2,130 households, and 1,145 families residing in the city. The population density was 291.7 inhabitants per square mile (112.6/km^{2}). There were 2,371 housing units at an average density of 145.6 per square mile (56.2/km^{2}). The racial makeup of the city was 79.92% White, 16.63% African American, 0.17% Native American, 1.89% Asian, 0.06% Pacific Islander, 0.61% from other races, and 0.72% from two or more races. Hispanic or Latino of any race were 1.77% of the population.

There were 2,130 households, out of which 29.0% had children under the age of 18 living with them, 39.8% were married couples living together,1.7% of households consisted of unmarried partners, 10.5% had a female householder with no husband present, and 46.2% were non-families. 35.0% of all households were made up of individuals, and 3.1% had someone living alone who was 65 years of age or older. The average household size was 2.23 and the average family size was 2.99.

In the city, the population was spread out, with 23.5% under the age of 18, 16.1% from 18 to 24, 41.0% from 25 to 44, 15.1% from 45 to 64, and 4.4% who were 65 years of age or older. The median age was 29 years. For every 100 females, there were 90.6 males. For every 100 females age 18 and over, there were 92.0 males.

The median income for a household in the city was $40,333, and the median income for a family was $49,767. Males had a median income of $37,500 versus $29,773 for females. The per capita income for the city was $21,875. About 10.3% of families and 13.9% of the population were below the poverty line, including 16.6% of those under age 18 and 9.2% of those age 65 or over.

== Economy ==
Flowood is the location of the National Weather Service office that serves the Jackson area.

== Parks and recreation ==
Flowood is home to numerous family friendly parks. Winner's Circle Park was voted Best Park in Mississippi in 2023. Flowood also has a Nature Park with a 1-mile walking trail through woods and around a lake. For sports, Flowood's Liberty Park is home to numerous baseball and soccer fields which brings in hundreds of kids and families each weekend.

== Education ==
=== K-12 schools ===
The City of Flowood's public schools are operated by the Rankin County School District.

Public schools

- Northwest Rankin High School (Grades 9-12)
- Northwest Rankin Middle School (Grades 7-8)
- Northwest Rankin Elementary School (Grades K-6)
- Flowood Elementary School (Grades K-6)
- Highland Bluff Elementary School (Grades K-6)
- Northshore Elementary School (Grades K-6)
- Oakdale Elementary School (Grades K-6)

Private schools

- Jackson Preparatory School, also known as Jackson Prep
- Hartfield Academy, previously known as University Christian School (1990-2012) and Brandon Academy (1970-1990)

=== Colleges and universities ===
Rankin County is in the district of Hinds Community College.

== Notable people ==
- Kyle Carpenter (born 1989), a retired United States Marine; in 2014 he received the highest military honor in the nation, the Medal of Honor for his actions in Afghanistan in 2010; the youngest currently living Medal of Honor recipient
- Chris Dowling, film director and screenwriter
- Chris Epps (born 1961), convicted of bribery; the former head of the Mississippi Department of Corrections
- J. T. Ginn (born 1999), professional baseball player.
- Josh Harkins (born 1974), Republican member of the Mississippi State Senate.
- Jake Mangum (born 1996), outfielder for the Pittsburgh Pirates.
- Gardner Minshew (born 1996), quarterback for the Arizona Cardinals
- Teresa Renkenberger, community leader, service provider for the homeless

== See also ==
- Airport Parkway
- Jackson metropolitan area
