= List of Interstate Highways in Mississippi =

- Standard route shields
- Interstate Highways highlighted in red

Highway names
- Interstates: Interstate X (I-X)
- US Highways: U.S. Route X (US X)
- State: Mississippi Highway X (MS X)

System links
- Mississippi State Highway System; Interstate; US; State

In the U.S. state of Mississippi, Interstate Highways are maintained by the Mississippi Department of Transportation (MDOT).

== Primary highways ==
Number	Length (mi)	Length (km)	Southern or western terminus	Northern or eastern terminus	Formed	Removed	Notes
I-10	77.056	124.010	I-10 at Louisiana state line (East Pearl River) east of Slidell	I-10 at Alabama state line near Missala	—	—	
I-14	—	—	Louisiana state line	Alabama state line	proposed	—	Proposed across the central part of the state, from the Louisiana state line (Mississippi River) near Natchez to the Alabama state line near Meridian; Proposal for the Fourteenth Amendment Highway
I-20	154.5	248.6	I-20 at Louisiana state line (Vicksburg Bridge) near Vicksburg	I-20/I-59 at Alabama state line near Kewanee	—	—	
I-22	106.0	170.6	US 78/I-269 in Byhalia	I-22 at Alabama state line east of Tremont	—	—	
I-55	290.41	467.37	I-55 at Louisiana state line near Osyka	I-55 at Tennessee state line near Southaven	—	—	
I-59	169	272	I-59 at Louisiana state line (East Pearl River) near Nicholson	I-20/I-59 at Alabama state line near Kewanee	—	—	
I-69	23.390	37.643	MS 304/MS 713 east of Banks	I-55 north of Hernando	—	—	Present highway co-signed with I-55 from eastern terminus to Tennessee state line. Proposed section to run from western terminus using existing US 61 roadbed to Greenville Bridge near Refuge

== Auxiliary highways ==
Number	Length (mi)	Length (km)	Southern or western terminus	Northern or eastern terminus	Formed	Removed	Notes
I-110	4.10	6.60	US 90 in Biloxi	I-10 in D'Iberville	1988	current	
I-220	12.01	19.33	I-20 in Jackson	I-55 in Ridgeland	1981	current	Beltway around northwestern Jackson
I-269	23.79	38.29	I-55/I-69 in Hernando	I-269 at Tennessee state line near Southaven	2015	current	Outer beltway of Memphis, northern beltway in Tennessee signed as SR 385
I-310	6	9.7	US 90 in Gulfport	I-10 in Gulfport	—	—	Future connector to the Port of Gulfport; also has the designation of MS 601
