= List of U.S. Routes in Mississippi =

- Standard route shields

Highway names
- Interstates: Interstate X (I-X)
- US Highways: U.S. Route X (US X)
- State: Mississippi Highway X (MS X)

System links
- Mississippi State Highway System; Interstate; US; State

In the U.S. state of Mississippi, U.S. Routes are maintained by the Mississippi Department of Transportation (MDOT).

== Mainline highways ==
Number	Length (mi)	Length (km)	Southern or western terminus	Northern or eastern terminus	Formed	Removed	Notes
US 11	173.1	278.6	I-59 at Nicholson	US 11 at the Alabama state line near Kewanee	1926	current	
US 45	273.5	440.2	US 45 at the Alabama state line near State Line	US 45 at the Tennessee state line near Wenesoga	1926	current	
US 49	204.2	328.6	US 90 at Gulfport	US 49E/US 49W at Yazoo City	1926	current	Southern segment
US 49	40.9	65.8	US 49E/US 49W at Tutwiler	US 49 at the Arkansas state line (Helena Bridge) near Helena	1926	current	Northern segment
US 49E	85.862	138.181	US 49 & US 49W at Yazoo City	US 49 & US 49W at Tutwiler	1926	current	
US 49W	81.894	131.796	US 49 & US 49E at Yazoo City	US 49 & US 49E at Tutwiler	1926	current	
US 51	267.2	430.0	US 51 at the Louisiana state line near Osyka	US 51 at the Tennessee state line near Horn Lake	1926	current	
US 61	299.8	482.5	US 61 at the Louisiana state line near Woodville	US 61 at the Tennessee state line near Lake View	1926	current	
US 65	2.9	4.7	US 61 in Natchez	US 65 at the Louisiana state line near Natchez	1926	2005	Entirely replaced by US 425
US 72	89.9	144.7	US 72 at the Tennessee state line near Barton	US 72 at the Alabama state line near Oldham	1926	current	
US 78	118.0	189.9	US 78 at the Tennessee state line near Olive Branch	US 78 at the Alabama state line near Tremont	1926	current	
US 80	157	253	US 80 at the Louisiana state line (Vicksburg Bridge) near Vicksburg	US 80 at the Alabama state line near Kewanee	1926	current	
US 82	180.0	289.7	US 82 at the Arkansas state line (Greenville Bridge) near Refuge	US 82 at the Alabama state line near New Hope	1932	current	
US 84	179.2	288.4	US 84 at the Louisiana state line (Natchez–Vidalia Bridge) near Natchez	US 84 at the Alabama state line near Waynesboro	1926	current	
US 90	79.7	128.3	US 90 at the Louisiana state line (East Pearl River) near Pearlington	US 90 at the Alabama state line near Pecan	1926	current	
US 98	166.3	267.6	US 61 at Washington	US 98 at the Alabama state line near Lucedale	1933	current	
US 278	135.5	218.1	US 278 at the Arkansas state line (Greenville Bridge) near Refuge	US 278 at the Alabama state line near Gattman	1978	current	
US 425	2.9	4.7	US 61 at Natchez, Mississippi	US 425 at the Louisiana state line (Natchez–Vidalia Bridge) near Natchez	2005	current	

== Special routes ==
Number	Length (mi)	Length (km)	Southern or western terminus	Northern or eastern terminus	Formed	Removed	Notes
US 45 Alt.	62.9	101.2	US 45 in Brooksville	US 45/US 278 in Shannon	1968	current	Signed as both US 45A and US 45 Alternate
US 51 Bus.	—	—	US 51 south of Crystal Springs	US 51 north of Crystal Springs	—	—	
US 51 Bus.	—	—	US 51 south of McComb	US 51 north of McComb	—	—	Unsigned
US 61 Bus.	—	—	US 61 south of Leland	US 61 north of Leland	—	—	
US 61 Bus.	—	—	US 61 south of Natchez	US 61 north of Natchez	—	—	
US 61 Bus.	—	—	US 61 south of Port Gibson	US 61 north of Port Gibson	—	—	
US 61 Bus.	—	—	US 61 south of Vicksburg	US 61 north of Vicksburg	—	—	Conncurrent with MS 834
