= National Register of Historic Places listings in Clarke County, Mississippi =

Location of Clarke County in Mississippi

This is a list of the National Register of Historic Places listings in Clarke County, Mississippi.

This is intended to be a complete list of the properties and districts on the National Register of Historic Places in Clarke County, Mississippi, United States. Latitude and longitude coordinates are provided for many National Register properties and districts; these locations may be seen together in a map.

There are 51 properties and districts listed on the National Register in the county. Another property was once listed but has been removed.

This National Park Service list is complete through NPS recent listings posted May 1, 2026.

== Current listings ==
	Name on the Register	Image	Date listed	Location	City or town	Description
1	Adams-Taylor-McRae House	Adams-Taylor-McRae House	May 22, 1980 (#80002207)	East of Pachuta; 32°01′18″N 88°47′21″W	Elwood	
2	C.V. Akin House	C.V. Akin House	May 20, 1994 (#94000512)	276 Clarion St. 31°58′19″N 88°42′54″W	Shubuta	
3	Asher's Cabin	Asher's Cabin	May 22, 1980 (#80002234)	823 Erwin Rd. 32°08′53″N 88°48′09″W	Stonewall	
4	Barbour-Estes House		May 22, 1980 (#80002209)	River Rd. 32°09′57″N 88°49′26″W	Enterprise	
5	Bradshaw-Booth House	Bradshaw-Booth House	May 22, 1980 (#80002210)	195 S. Stonewall St. 32°09′55″N 88°48′47″W	Enterprise	
6	Brown-Wilson House	Brown-Wilson House	May 22, 1980 (#80002211)	6100 US-11; 32°09′56″N 88°50′04″W	Enterprise	
7	Judge John L. Buckley House	Judge John L. Buckley House	May 20, 1994 (#94000513)	204 E. Bridge St. 32°10′33″N 88°49′29″W	Enterprise	
8	Carmichael House		May 22, 1980 (#80002204)	South of De Soto along the Gulf, Mobile and Ohio railroad tracks 31°58′11″N 88°42′52″W	De Soto	
9	Benjamin H. Carter House	Benjamin H. Carter House	May 20, 1994 (#94000514)	210 Ferrill St. 32°02′12″N 88°43′31″W	Quitman	
10	Clarke County Courthouse and Confederate Monument	Clarke County Courthouse and Confederate Monument	May 20, 1994 (#94000511)	Archusa St. at the head of Main St. 32°02′23″N 88°43′39″W	Quitman	
11	Compton-Short House	Compton-Short House	May 22, 1980 (#80002212)	260 Church St. 32°10′28″N 88°48′10″W	Enterprise	
12	Cook-Sellers House		May 22, 1980 (#80002205)	E. Station St. 31°58′24″N 88°42′46″W	De Soto	
13	Covington House		May 22, 1980 (#80002206)	Northeast of De Soto; 31°59′15″N 88°42′25″W	De Soto	
14	Davis House		May 22, 1980 (#80002213)	River Rd. 32°10′28″N 88°49′26″W	Enterprise	
15	Dearman House		May 22, 1980 (#80002214)	Bridge St. and River Rd. 32°10′27″N 88°49′26″W	Enterprise	
16	East Enterprise Historic District		May 20, 1994 (#94000510)	Roughly bounded by S. Stonewall St., Church St., Mississippi Highway 513, and Tuscahoma Rd. 32°10′29″N 88°48′41″W	Enterprise	
17	Enterprise Bridge	Enterprise Bridge	November 16, 1988 (#88002402)	Spans the Chickasawhay River on Bridge St. 32°10′33″N 88°49′11″W	Enterprise	
18	Capt. C.C. Ferrill House	Capt. C.C. Ferrill House	May 20, 1994 (#94000509)	118 E. Franklin St. 32°02′09″N 88°43′31″W	Quitman	
19	Ford-Williams House		May 22, 1980 (#80002208)	11217 CR-514; 32°11′14″N 88°31′00″W	Energy	No Longer in Existence
20	Forestdale Plantation	Forestdale Plantation	May 22, 1980 (#80002229)	444 County Rd. 1221; 32°00′43″N 88°49′13″W	Pachuta	
21	Hand House	Hand House	May 22, 1980 (#80002231)	347 North St. 31°51′45″N 88°41′49″W	Shubuta	
22	Highway 11 Bridge over Chunky River	Highway 11 Bridge over Chunky River	November 16, 1988 (#88002400)	Spans the Chunky River on U.S. Route 11; 32°11′32″N 88°49′30″W	Enterprise	
23	House at 200 East Franklin Street	House at 200 East Franklin Street	June 2, 1994 (#94000538)	200 E. Franklin St. 32°02′10″N 88°43′28″W	Quitman	
24	House on Old Mill Creek Road		May 20, 1994 (#94000508)	Western side of Old Mill Creek Rd., between Old Mill Creek Rd. and U.S. Route 11; 32°10′38″N 88°49′44″W	Enterprise	
25	Hunter-Frost House		May 22, 1980 (#80002215)	River Rd. 32°09′56″N 88°49′25″W	Enterprise	
26	J.K. Kirkland General Merchandise Store	J.K. Kirkland General Merchandise Store	May 20, 1994 (#94000507)	124 Main St. 32°02′23″N 88°43′46″W	Quitman	
27	Lee-Mitts House	Lee-Mitts House	May 22, 1980 (#80002216)	83 S. Stonewall St. 32°10′27″N 88°48′48″W	Enterprise	
28	McCrory-Deas-Buckley House	McCrory-Deas-Buckley House	May 22, 1980 (#80002217)	203 S. Southwell St. 32°10′27″N 88°48′48″W	Enterprise	
29	Dr. McNair House	Dr. McNair House	November 4, 2009 (#94000500)	116 E. Church St. 32°02′25″N 88°43′37″W	Quitman	
30	McNeill-McGee House	McNeill-McGee House	May 22, 1980 (#80002226)	209 County Rd. 2301; 31°53′23″N 88°53′23″W	Lake Bounds	Mostly Collapsed
31	Methodist Parsonage House		May 22, 1980 (#80002219)	A St. 32°09′57″N 88°49′26″W	Enterprise	
32	Noah Moore House	Noah Moore House	May 20, 1994 (#94000506)	316 Main St. 32°10′26″N 88°49′32″W	Enterprise	
33	Overseer's House and Outbuildings of Lang Plantation		May 22, 1980 (#80002227)	Off County Road 610 in Langsdale; 31°53′21″N 88°35′11″W	Langsdale	
34	Pilgrim's Rest		May 22, 1980 (#80002220)	Tuscaboma St. 32°10′29″N 88°48′09″W	Enterprise	
35	Prairie Place		May 22, 1980 (#80002228)	Off County Road 610 in Langsdale; 31°53′21″N 88°35′12″W	Langsdale	
36	Price-Patton-Pettis House		May 22, 1980 (#80002232)	North and 2nd Sts. 31°51′47″N 88°41′43″W	Shubuta	
37	Quitman Depot	Quitman Depot	May 20, 1994 (#94000505)	Eastern side of the Illinois Central Gulf railroad tracks, near the junction of Main St. and Railroad Ave. 32°02′23″N 88°43′49″W	Quitman	
38	Quitman Downtown-Mill Historic District		September 9, 2016 (#16000614)	Roughly bounded by Long Blvd., Jackson, Franklin & Railroad Aves. 32°02′22″N 88°43′32″W	Quitman	
39	Riverside Plantation		May 22, 1980 (#80002221)	U.S. Highway 11; 32°10′59″N 88°50′03″W	Enterprise	
40	Shubuta Baptist Church	Shubuta Baptist Church	June 24, 1994 (#94000641)	Eucutta St. at its junction with U.S. Route 45; 31°51′37″N 88°42′00″W	Shubuta	
41	Shubuta Bridge	Shubuta Bridge	November 16, 1988 (#88002490)	Spans the Chickasawhay River on a county road, east of Shubuta; 31°51′25″N 88°41′12″W	Shubuta	
42	Shubuta Methodist Episcopal Church, South		May 20, 1994 (#94000504)	Eastern side of High St. (U.S. Route 45); 31°51′33″N 88°41′59″W	Shubuta	
43	Smith-McClain-Buckley House	Smith-McClain-Buckley House	May 22, 1980 (#80002222)	220 S. Stonewall St. 32°09′56″N 88°48′48″W	Enterprise	
44	Stephenson-Allen House		May 22, 1980 (#80002223)	126 MS-513; 32°10′26″N 88°50′02″W	Enterprise	
45	Stonewall Mill Village Historic District		May 20, 1994 (#94000503)	Roughly the area surrounding Erwin Rd. between Alice and Allen Aves. 32°08′08″N 88°47′21″W	Stonewall	
46	Sumrall-Albritton House		May 22, 1980 (#80002233)	U.S. Highway 45; 31°54′18″N 88°42′31″W	Shubuta	
47	Trotter-Byrd House	Trotter-Byrd House	May 22, 1980 (#80002230)	419 E. Franklin St. 32°01′55″N 88°43′31″W	Quitman	
48	Ward House		May 22, 1980 (#80002224)	3 miles north of Enterprise; 32°12′37″N 88°50′05″W	Enterprise	
49	Jim Williams House	Jim Williams House	May 20, 1994 (#94000502)	125 River Rd. 32°10′34″N 88°49′18″W	Enterprise	
50	Woolverton-Boyd House		May 22, 1980 (#80002225)	520 MS-513; 32°09′58″N 88°48′45″W	Enterprise	
51	W.W. Wyatt House	W.W. Wyatt House	May 20, 1994 (#94000501)	107 N. River Rd. 32°10′37″N 88°49′18″W	Enterprise	

== Former listing ==
	Name on the Register	Image	Date listed	Date removed	Location	City or town	Description
1	McGee-Hudson House		1980 (#80002218)	January 31, 1994	Tuscaboma Street	Enterprise	Destroyed by fire in 1993.

== See also ==
- List of National Historic Landmarks in Mississippi
- National Register of Historic Places listings in Mississippi
