= Carmichael House =

Carmichael House may refer to:

- Carmichael House (Macon, Georgia), a National Historic Landmark
- Carmichael House (Louisville, Kentucky), listed on the National Register of Historic Places (NRHP)
- W. S. Carmichael House, Petoskey, Michigan
- Carmichael House (De Soto, Mississippi), listed on the NRHP
