= Sumrall-Albritton House =

Historic house in Mississippi, United States

- U.S. National Register of Historic Places
- Location within Mississippi Location within the United States
- Location: SR 45, Shubuta, Mississippi
- Coordinates: 31°54′18″N 88°42′31″W
- Area: less than one acre
- Built: 1859
- Architectural style: Greek Revival, Greek Revival vernacular
- MPS: Clarke County Antebellum Houses TR
- NRHP reference No.: 80002233
- Added to NRHP: May 22, 1980

The Sumrall-Albritton House is a historic house in Quitman, Mississippi, USA. It was built for Jacob Sumrall, who worked for the Mobile and Ohio Railroad. It was designed in the Greek Revival architectural style, and it was completed in 1855. It has been listed on the National Register of Historic Places since May 22, 1980.
