= C.V. Akin House =

- U.S. National Register of Historic Places
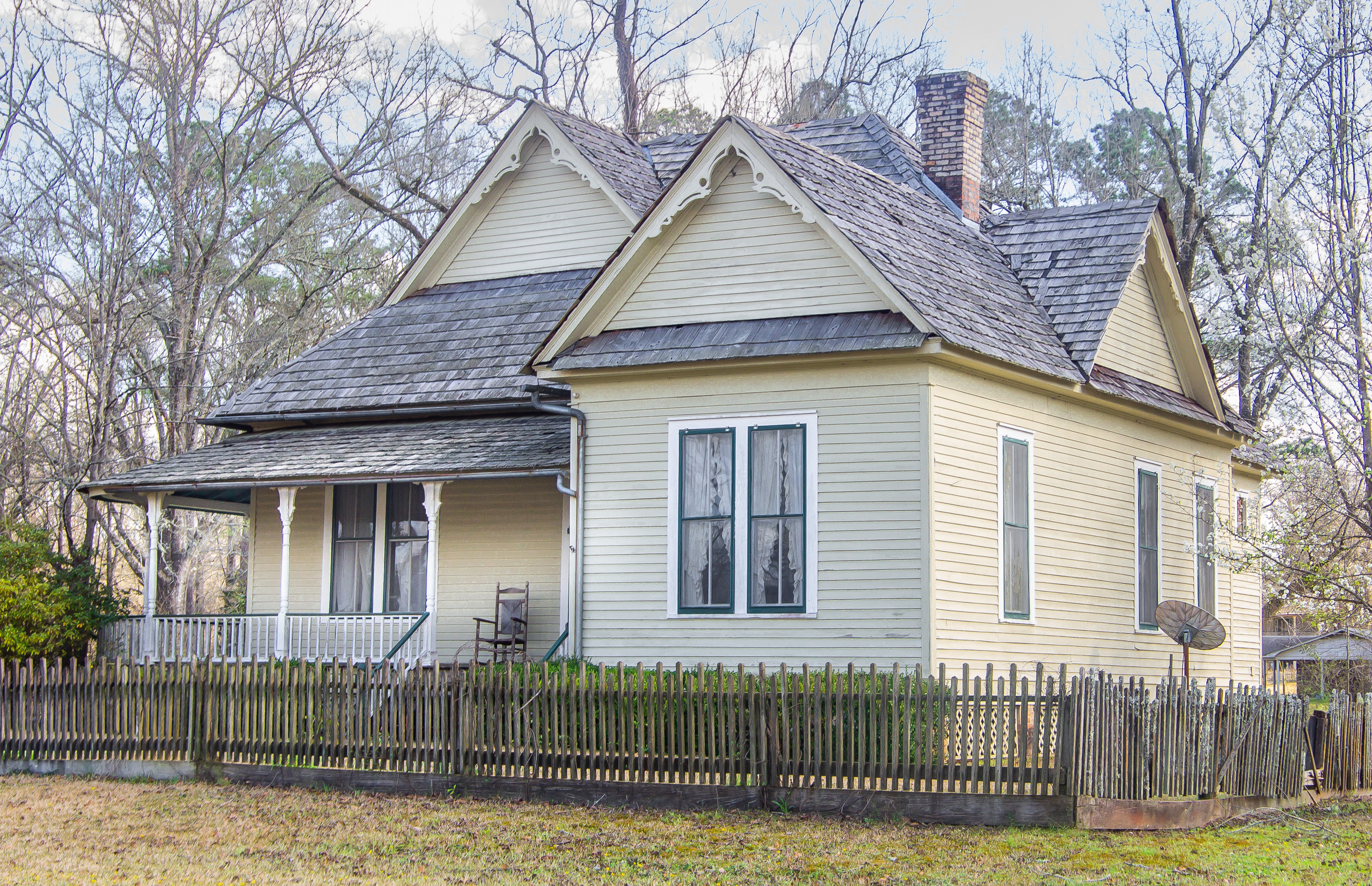
- The house in 2022
- Interactive map of C.V. Akin House
- Location: 276 Clarion St., De Soto, Mississippi, U.S.
- Coordinates: 31.971944°N 88.715°W
- Built: 1898–1899
- Architect: Unknown
- Architectural style: Queen Anne
- NRHP reference No.: 94000512
- Added to NRHP: May 20, 1994

The C.V. Akin House is a historic house in De Soto, Mississippi, United States. Built around 1899, the house is built in the Queen Anne architectural style. It was listed on the National Register of Historic Places in 1994.

== Description ==
The C.V. Akin House, located along Clarion Street in De Soto, was built in the Queen Anne architectural style and features spindlework with extensive lathe-turned ornamentation and curved features. The Clarke County Tribune compared the house's spindlework style to the Capt. C.C. Ferrill House in nearby Quitman, Mississippi. The house was featured in the book Victorian Houses of Mississippi, which described the Akin House as "a well-preserved Queen Anne cottage."

== History ==
The house was built around 1898 or 1899. It was listed on the National Register of Historic Places on May 10, 1994.
