= Benjamin H. Carter House =

Historic house in Mississippi, United States

- U.S. National Register of Historic Places
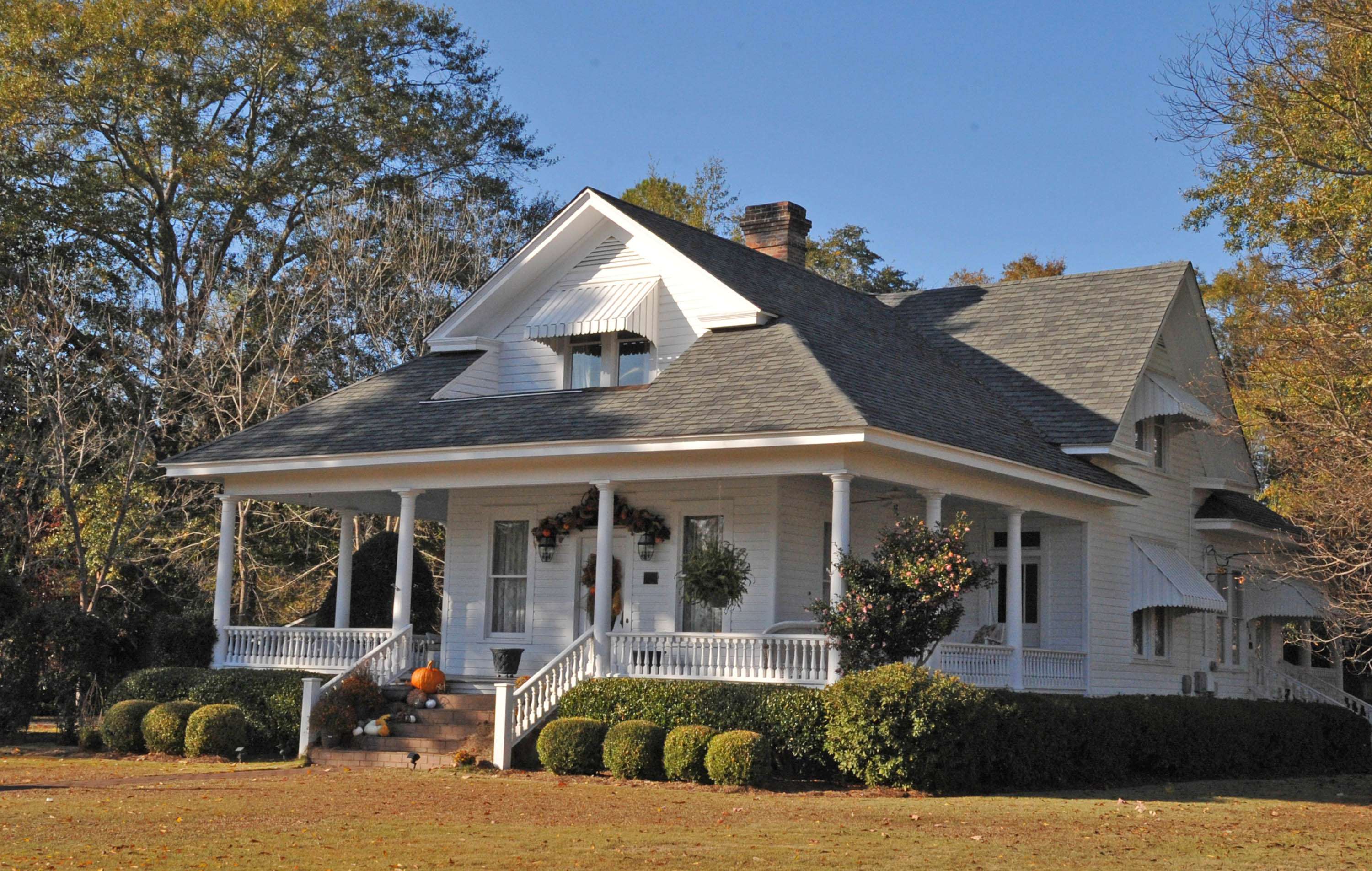
- The Benjamin H. Carter House in 2008

- Location within Mississippi
- Location: 210 Ferrill Street, Quitman, Mississippi
- Coordinates: 32°02′12″N 88°43′31″W
- Area: 1.1 acres (0.45 ha)
- Built: 1911
- Architectural style: Colonial Revival
- MPS: Clarke County MPS
- NRHP reference No.: 94000514
- Added to NRHP: May 20, 1994

The Benjamin H. Carter House is a historic house in Quitman, Mississippi. It was built in 1911–1912 by George Carson for Benjamin Harvey Carter, the sheriff of Clarke County. Carter served as the president of the Bank of Quitman from 1931 to 1961.

The house was designed in the Colonial Revival architectural style. It has been listed on the National Register of Historic Places since May 20, 1994.
