= Buckley House =

Buckley House may refer to:

in the United States

(by state)

- Buckley Ranch, Hartsel, CO, listed on the NRHP in Colorado
- Buckley Homestead, Lowell, IN, listed on the NRHP in Indiana
- Judge John L. Buckley House, Enterprise, MS, listed on the NRHP in Mississippi
- McCrory-Deas-Buckley House, Enterprise, MS, listed on the NRHP in Mississippi
- Smith-McClain-Buckley House, Enterprise, MS, listed on the NRHP in Mississippi
- Buckley House (New Hebron, Mississippi), listed on the NRHP in Mississippi
- James Buckley House, Cape Vincent, NY, listed on the NRHP in New York
- Anthony-Buckley House, La Grande, OR, listed on the NRHP in Oregon
- Patrick J. Buckley House, Waukesha, WI, listed on the NRHP in Wisconsin
