= Langsdale Plantation =

Historic house in Mississippi, United States

- Prairie Place
- U.S. National Register of Historic Places
- Location within Mississippi Location within the United States
- Location: Clarke County, Mississippi
- Coordinates: 31.88997°N 88.58477°W
- Area: 0 acres (0 ha)
- Built: 1855
- Built by: Clement D. Lang
- Architectural style: Greek Revival
- MPS: Clarke County Antebellum Houses TR
- NRHP reference No.: 80002228
- Added to NRHP: May 22, 1980

The Langsdale Plantation, also known as Prairie Place, is a historic plantation in Clarke County, Mississippi, USA. It has been listed on the National Register of Historic Places since May 22, 1980.
