= Cook-Sellers House =

Historic house in Mississippi, United States

- U.S. National Register of Historic Places
- Location within Mississippi Location within the United States
- Location: E. Station St., DeSoto, Mississippi
- Coordinates: 31°58′16.813″N 88°42′46.685″W
- Area: 9.9 acres (4.0 ha)
- Built: c. 1855
- MPS: Clarke County Antebellum Houses TR (64000407)
- NRHP reference No.: 80002205
- Added to NRHP: 22 May 1980

The Cook-Sellers House in Desoto, Mississippi is a historic house built c. 1855.

== Description and history ==
The house is a one-story wood frame building with a T–plan. The facade has an undercut gallery and an ornamented entry. The front of the gallery is defined by six square columns and square balustrades. The centered steps are inset within the gallery and lead to the door which is flanked by engaged square columns supporting a full entablature. Within this are multi–paned sidelights and transom. The house dates from the arrival of the railroad in DeSoto (c. 1855) and is one of two extant homes that predate the American Civil War there. Desoto was one of four principle towns, all on the Chickasawhay River and/or along the Mobile and Ohio Railroad, established in Clarke County before the war.

The Cook–Sellers House was listed on the National Register of Historic Places on May 22, 1980, as part of a thematic resource, "Clark County Antebellum Houses".

== See also ==
- Historic preservation
- National Register of Historic Places listings in Clarke County, Mississippi
