= Annette Van Dyke =

American women's studies academic (born 1943)

- Born: November 9, 1943 (age 82); Sacramento, California, U.S.
- Children: 2

Academic background
- Education: Whitworth College; Eastern Washington University; University of Minnesota
- Doctoral advisor: Gayle Graham Yates

Academic work
- Discipline: Women's studies
- Institutions: University of Cincinnati; Denison University; University of Illinois Springfield

Annette Joy Van Dyke (born November 9, 1943) is an American women's studies academic who was a professor of interdisciplinary and women's studies at the University of Illinois Springfield from 1993 to 2010. She was president of the National Women's Studies Association from 2000 to 2001.

== Early life and education ==
Van Dyke was born on November 9, 1943, in Sacramento, California to Joy and Wallace F. Van Dyke. Her father was a U.S. Air Force officer. She earned a B.A. cum laude from Whitworth College in 1970. She received a M.A. in English from Eastern Washington University in 1972.

Van Dyke told Contemporary Authors:

When I earned my master's degree in English in the 1970s, I had not been assigned to read one woman writer. My passion has been to change that. My work as a literary critic is centered on women writers, especially those who come from non-mainstream American cultures such as lesbian writers and Native American women writers. My own experiments with writing the murder mystery have taught me a lot about writing, making me a better resource for my students.

From 1978 to 1981, Van Dyke was an instructor in English and academic counselor at Bemidji State University. She completed a Ph.D. in American studies at the University of Minnesota in 1987. Her dissertation was titled, Feminist Curing Ceremonies: The Goddess in Contemporary Spiritual Traditions. Gayle Graham Yates was her doctoral advisor.

== Career ==
From 1987 to 1988, Van Dyke was an English instructor at Normandale Community College. She served as the associate director of the University of Cincinnati center for women's studies from 1988 to 1990. At Denison University, she was an assistant professor and director of women's studies from 1990 to 1993. From 1990 to 1993, she was the lesbian caucus chair of the National Women's Studies Association (NWSA). In 1993, Van Dyke joined the University of Illinois Springfield as an associate professor and was promoted to professor of interdisciplinary studies and women's studies. She served as the director of individual option and liberal studies programs from 1997 to 1999. Van Dyke was the NWSA president from 2000 to 2001. She retired in 2010 and taught for a year at the Shanghai International Studies University. Van Dyke moved to Portland, Oregon and became an acrylic painter.

== Personal life ==
Van Dyke has two children. Her companion is Cheryl L. Howard. She is lesbian.
