= Ward House (Enterprise, Mississippi) =

Historic house in Mississippi, United States

- U.S. National Register of Historic Places
- Location within Mississippi Location within the United States
- Nearest city: Enterprise, Clarke County, Mississippi
- Coordinates: 32°12′37″N 88°50′5″W
- Area: 2 acres (0.81 ha)
- Built: 1853
- Architectural style: Greek Revival, Greek Revival vernacular
- MPS: Clarke County Antebellum Houses TR
- NRHP reference No.: 80002224
- Added to NRHP: May 22, 1980

The Ward House is a historic plantation house in Enterprise, Mississippi, USA. It was built for W.A. Ward, a planter from South Carolina. It was designed in the Greek Revival architectural style, and it was completed in 1853. It has been listed on the National Register of Historic Places since May 22, 1980.
