= Homer Smith =

Homer Smith may refer to:

- Homer Smith (American football) (1931–2011), American gridiron football player and coach
- Homer W. Smith (1895–1962), American physiologist and science writer
- Homer Smith Jr (1909–1972), American journalist and postal worker
- J. Homer Smith, druggist and banker who served as the mayor of Yuma, Arizona
- Homer Smith, primary character in the 1962 novel, and subsequent 1963 film Lilies of the Field
