= Riverside Plantation =

Riverside Plantation may refer to:

- Riverside Plantation (Enterprise, Mississippi), listed on the NRHP in Mississippi
- Riverside Plantation Tabby Ruins, Frogmore, South Carolina, listed on the NRHP in South Carolina
