= Trotter-Byrd House =

Historic house in Mississippi, United States

- U.S. National Register of Historic Places
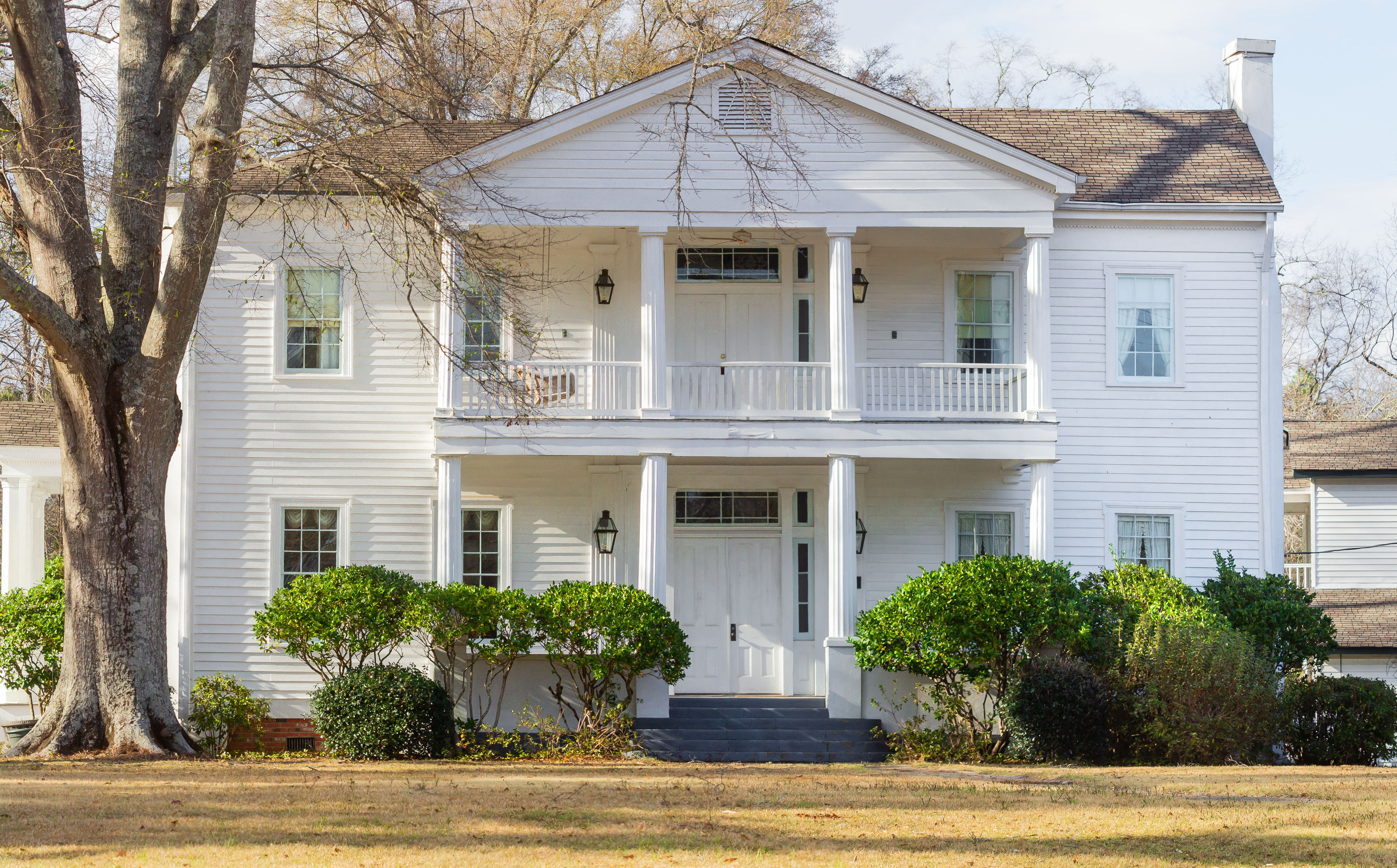

- Location within Mississippi
- Location: 419 East Franklin St. Quitman, Mississippi
- Coordinates: 32°01′55″N 88°43′31″W
- Area: 9.9 acres (4.0 ha)
- Built: 1852
- Architectural style: Greek Revival
- MPS: Clarke County Antebellum Houses TR
- NRHP reference No.: 80002230
- Added to NRHP: May 22, 1980

The Trotter-Byrd House is a historic two-story house in Quitman, Mississippi. It was built for Brigadier General William B. Trotter before the American Civil War. It is listed on the National Register of Historic Places.

== History ==
The house was built in 1852 for William B. Trotter and his wife, Elizabeth Lee Terrell, who was a descendant of President George Washington. Trotter was an attorney from Tennessee who was elected as the Brigadier General of the Mississippi Militia in 1847. Trotter authored and self-published A History and Defense of African Slavery in 1861. The book was copyrighted by the government of the Confederate States of America. Trotter died in 1862, and the house was inherited by his descendants.

The house remained in the Trotter family until 1977, when it was purchased and restored by Dr. Wayne Byrd. It was auctioned in 2017.

== Architectural significance ==
The house was designed in the Greek Revival architectural style. It has been listed on the National Register of Historic Places since May 22, 1980.
