= Sykes, Mississippi =

- Unincorporated community
- Location within Mississippi Location within the United States
- Coordinates: 32°05′39″N 88°35′32″W
- Country: United States
- State: Mississippi
- County: Clarke
- Elevation: 318 ft (97 m)
- Time zone: UTC-6 (Central (CST))
  - Summer (DST): UTC-5 (CDT)
- Area codes: 601 & 769
- GNIS feature ID: 692253

Sykes is an unincorporated community in Clarke County, Mississippi, United States. Sykes is located on Mississippi Highway 18 8.8 miles (14.2 km) east-northeast of Quitman.

A post office operated under the name Sykes from 1903 to 1915.
