= Death of Jonathan Sanders =

2015 death of a man in Mississippi police custody

- Date: July 8, 2015
- Type: Death

On July 8, 2015, Jonathan Sanders, a 39-year-old Black man, died while being restrained by Stonewall, Mississippi police officer Kevin Herrington. In January 2016, a grand jury declined to indict the officer, and in March 2016, a grand jury determined Sanders choked after swallowing a bag of cocaine, and police had not used excessive force while restraining him.

== Incident and inquiry ==
At the time of the incident, witnesses reported that the officer had used a racial slur during his encounter with Sanders, and that Sanders' breathing had been obstructed by officer Kevin Herrington for as much as 30 minutes. Sanders died at the scene. At his funeral on July 18, 2015, 1,000 people attended. The Federal Bureau of Investigation (FBI) was reported to have joined the investigation into Sanders' death.

== Outcome of grand jury ==
Following a medical autopsy in July 2015, which determined the cause of death as homicide by "manual asphyxiation", Clarke County District Attorney Bilbo Mitchell scheduled a grand jury. In January 2016, a grand jury determined that Sanders died of "mechanical asphyxia" after swallowing a bag of cocaine, and that the police officer was in the right to pursue Sanders based on the suspicion he was involved in drug activity. It furthermore determined there was no evidence showing a traumatic injury inflicted by the police officer. There was speculation over whether the police officer had used a racial slur during the incident. The jury found no evidence to support that. The jury concluded that Sanders "did not act in conformity with his normal character due to the influence of cocaine which was found in his system at the time of his death". The NAACP doubted the grand jury findings and released a statement asking for an outside investigation by the Department of Justice.
