= Stonewall, Mississippi =

- Town
- Flag Seal

- Location of Stonewall, Mississippi

- Location in the United States
- Coordinates: 32°8′2″N 88°47′33″W
- Country: United States
- State: Mississippi
- County: Clarke

Government
  - Type: Mayor/Alderman

Area
  - Total: 2.66 sq mi (6.90 km^{2})
  - Land: 2.66 sq mi (6.88 km^{2})
  - Water: 0.0077 sq mi (0.02 km^{2})
- Elevation: 230 ft (70 m)

Population (2020)
  - Total: 879
  - Density: 331.0/sq mi (127.81/km^{2})
- Time zone: UTC-6 (Central (CST))
  - Summer (DST): UTC-5 (CDT)
- ZIP code: 39363
- Area code: 601
- FIPS code: 28-70760
- GNIS feature ID: 0678313
- Website: townofstonewall.org

Stonewall is a town in Clarke County, Mississippi, United States. As of the 2020 census, Stonewall had a population of 879.

== History ==
A cotton mill was established here in 1868. The town was named after Confederate Army General Stonewall Jackson.

Stonewall's major industry from 1868 until 2002 was the cotton mill which operated as Burlington Industries from 1962 onward. In 2002, Burlington announced that it would be closing the Stonewall plant and put 850 people out of work.

== Geography ==
The Chickasawhay River forms the western boundary of the town. The town of Enterprise is 3 miles (5 km) to the northwest on Mississippi Highway 513, while Quitman, the county seat, is 9 miles (14 km) to the southeast.

According to the United States Census Bureau, the town has a total area of 2.7 square miles (6.9 km^{2}), of which 0.008 square miles (0.02 km^{2}), or 0.36%, is water.

== Demographics ==
Historical population
Census	Pop.	Note	%±
1880	145		—
1950	1,015		—
1960	1,126		10.9%
1970	1,161		3.1%
1980	1,345		15.8%
1990	1,148		−14.6%
2000	1,149		0.1%
2010	1,088		−5.3%
2020	879		−19.2%
U.S. Decennial Census

=== 2020 census ===
Stonewall racial composition (NH = Non-Hispanic) (Note: Note: the US Census treats Hispanic/Latino as an ethnic category. This table excludes Latinos from the racial categories and assigns them to a separate category. Hispanics/Latinos can be of any race.)
Race	Number	Percentage
White (NH)	567	64.51%
Black or African American (NH)	289	32.88%
Native American or Alaska Native (NH)	1	0.11%
Some Other Race (NH)	2	0.23%
Mixed/Multi-Racial (NH)	15	1.71%
Hispanic or Latino	5	0.57%
Total	879	

As of the 2020 United States census, there were 879 people, 405 households, and 210 families residing in the town.

=== 2000 census ===
As of the census of 2000, there were 1,149 people, 461 households, and 319 families residing in the town. The population density was 435.4 inhabitants per square mile (168.1/km^{2}). There were 542 housing units at an average density of 205.4 per square mile (79.3/km^{2}). The racial makeup of the town was 75.37% White, 23.67% African American, 0.52% Native American, 0.09% from other races, and 0.35% from two or more races. Hispanic or Latino of any race were 0.44% of the population.

There were 461 households, out of which 30.8% had children under the age of 18 living with them, 48.6% were married couples living together, 16.7% had a female householder with no husband present, and 30.6% were non-families. 27.8% of all households were made up of individuals, and 11.5% had someone living alone who was 65 years of age or older. The average household size was 2.49 and the average family size was 3.05.

In the town, the population was spread out, with 27.2% under the age of 18, 9.0% from 18 to 24, 26.5% from 25 to 44, 22.9% from 45 to 64, and 14.4% who were 65 years of age or older. The median age was 35 years. For every 100 females, there were 93.8 males. For every 100 females age 18 and over, there were 87.0 males.

The median income for a household in the town was $23,125, and the median income for a family was $31,172. Males had a median income of $26,477 versus $22,404 for females. The per capita income for the town was $12,930. About 18.3% of families and 23.8% of the population were below the poverty line, including 34.6% of those under age 18 and 16.0% of those age 65 or over.

== Education ==
Stonewall is served by the Quitman School District.

The county is in the zone for Jones College.

== Notable person ==
- Herman Dunlap, Negro league outfielder
- Danny Pearson, composer and singer-songwriter

== See also ==
- Death of Jonathan Sanders - Sanders choked on a bag of cocaine while restrained by police in Stonewall
