= Wendorf =

Wendorf may refer to:

== People ==
- Fred Wendorf (1924–2015), Henderson-Morrison Professor emeritus of Anthropology at Southern Methodist University
- James H. Wendorf, executive director of the National Center for Learning Disabilities (NCLD)
- Keith Wendorf (born 1949), Canadian-born former German curler and curling coach.
- Richard Wendorf (died 1996), murder victim of Rod Ferrell
- Richard Wendorf (born 1948), Art historian and Librarian
- Sven Wendorf (born 1972), German politician

== Places ==
- Wendorf, Mecklenburg-Vorpommern, a municipality in Germany

== Other ==
- The Wendorf Collection, a collection of artifacts donated to the British Museum by Fred Wendorf

== See also ==
- Wiendorf, municipality in Rostock, Mecklenburg-Vorpommern
