= Andy Blakeney =

- Born: June 10, 1898; Quitman, Mississippi
- Died: February 12, 1992 (aged 93); Baldwin Park, California
- Instrument: Trumpet

Andy Blakeney (June 10, 1898, Quitman, Mississippi – February 12, 1992, Baldwin Park, California) was an American jazz trumpeter. He was a fixture of the New Orleans jazz scene for decades.

Blakeney played briefly for King Oliver and Doc Cook in Chicago in 1925. He moved to California in 1926, where he played with Sonny Clay and Reb Spikes, including on records. He worked in Los Angeles in the 1930s with Les Hite and Lionel Hampton, then played in Monk McFay's band in Hawaii in 1935–39 and led his own band for a time thereafter. In 1941 he returned to the continental United States, playing with Ceele Burke (1942–46), Horace Henderson (1946), and Kid Ory (1947). He led his own Dixieland outfits in California through the 1950s, but didn't record with any of them.

In the 1960s Blakeney played with the Young Men of New Orleans, in the 1970s with the Legends of Jazz, and in the 1980s with the Eagle Brass Band. He was still active almost up until the time of his death in 1992.
