= Danny Pearson (musician) =

American musician

- Birth name: Daniel Pearson
- Born: January 6, 1953; Stonewall, Mississippi, U.S.
- Died: August 17, 2018 (aged 65); Stonewall, Mississippi, U.S.
- Genres: Soul, Neo-soul, R&B, Disco
- Occupation(s): Singer-songwriter, record producer, arranger, musician
- Instrument(s): Piano, keyboards, vocals, guitar,
- Years active: 1978–2018
- Labels: Unlimited Gold Records
- Website: www.facebook.com/DannyPearsonMusic

Danny Pearson (January 6, 1953 – August 17, 2018) was an American composer and singer-songwriter. His sole release was the 1978 album Barry White Presents Mr. Danny Pearson, which was produced by Barry White. The lead single from the album, "What's Your Sign Girl?", peaked at #16 on the U.S. R&B charts and at #106 on the Billboard Bubbling Under Hits. At the time of his death, he was in the process of recording a new album.

Pearson was born in Stonewall, Mississippi, and in 1955 his family moved to Racine, Wisconsin where he spent his childhood. He died in 2018 in Stonewall after a three-year battle with liver cancer, at the age of 65.

== Discography ==
=== Albums ===
Year	Album	US R&B
1978	Barry White Presents Mr. Danny Pearson	72

=== Singles ===
Year	Title	Chart Positions	
Year	Title	US R&B	US Pop
1978	"What's Your Sign Girl"	16	106
1978	"Is It Really True Girl"	—	—
1978	"Honey Please, Can't You See"	—	—
