= Barnett, Mississippi =

- Unincorporated community
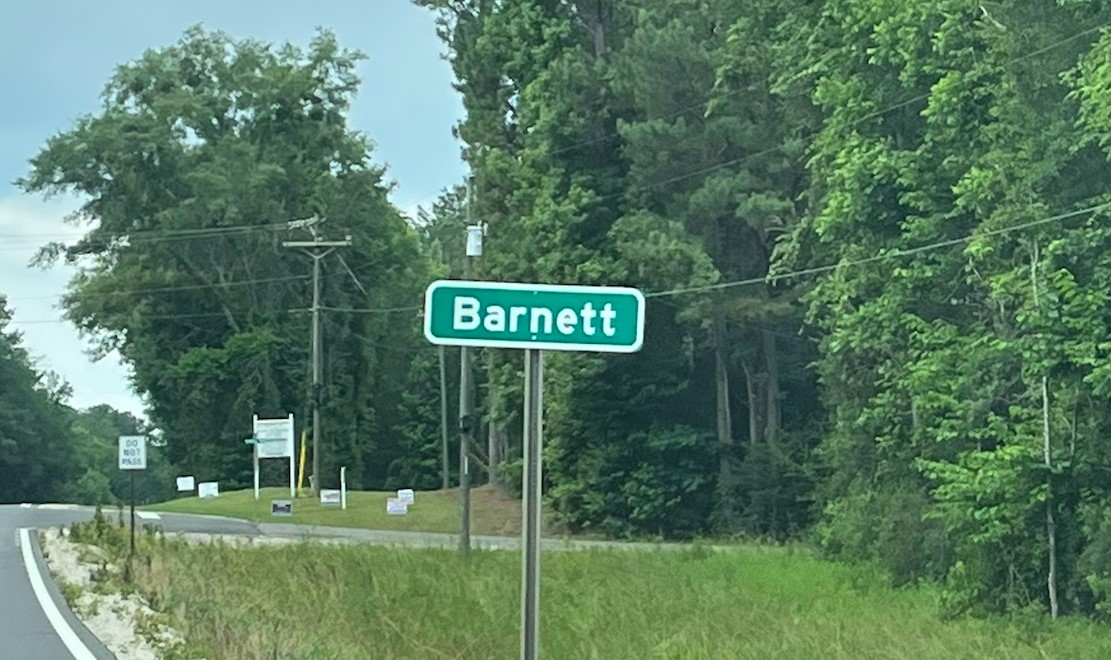

- Location within Mississippi Location within the United States
- Coordinates: 31°59′12″N 88°54′18″W
- Country: United States
- State: Mississippi
- County: Clarke
- Elevation: 308 ft (94 m)
- Time zone: UTC-6 (Central (CST))
  - Summer (DST): UTC-5 (CDT)
- Area codes: 601 & 769
- GNIS feature ID: 691683

Barnett, (also known as Richmond), is an unincorporated community in Clarke County, Mississippi, United States.

== History ==
Barnett is located on the Norfolk Southern Railway and in 1910 had three general stores. The Smith Lumber Company also owned a sawmill in Barnett. In 1900, Barnett had a population of 56.

A post office operated under the name Barnett from 1883 to 1956.
