= Herman Dunlap =

American baseball player

- Outfielder
- Born: March 10, 1908; Stonewall, Mississippi, U.S.
- Died: May 15, 1978 (aged 70); Los Angeles, California, U.S.
- Batted: Left Threw: Left

Negro league baseball debut
- 1936, for the Chicago American Giants

Last appearance
- 1938, for the Chicago American Giants
- Stats at Baseball Reference

Teams
- Chicago American Giants (1936–1938)

Herman Pythias Dunlap (10 March 1908 – 15 May 1978) was an American Negro league baseball outfielder in the 1930s.

A native of Stonewall, Mississippi, Dunlap made his Negro leagues debut in 1936 with the Chicago American Giants, and was selected as a rookie to represent Chicago in the East–West All-Star Game. He played two more seasons for the club through 1938. Dunlap died in Los Angeles, California in 1978 at age 70.
