= Shubuta Methodist Episcopal Church, South =

Historic church in Mississippi, United States

- U.S. National Register of Historic Places
- Location within Mississippi Location within the United States
- Location: High St. (US 45), E side, Shubuta, Mississippi
- Coordinates: 31°51′33″N 88°41′59″W
- Area: less than one acre
- Built: 1891
- Architectural style: Carpenter Gothic
- MPS: Clarke County MPS
- NRHP reference No.: 94000504
- Added to NRHP: May 20, 1994

Shubuta Methodist Episcopal Church, South is a historic Methodist Episcopal church on High Street (US 45) on the east side in Shubuta, Mississippi.

It was built in 1891 and added to the National Register in 1994.
