= Forestdale Plantation =

Historic house in Mississippi, United States

- U.S. National Register of Historic Places
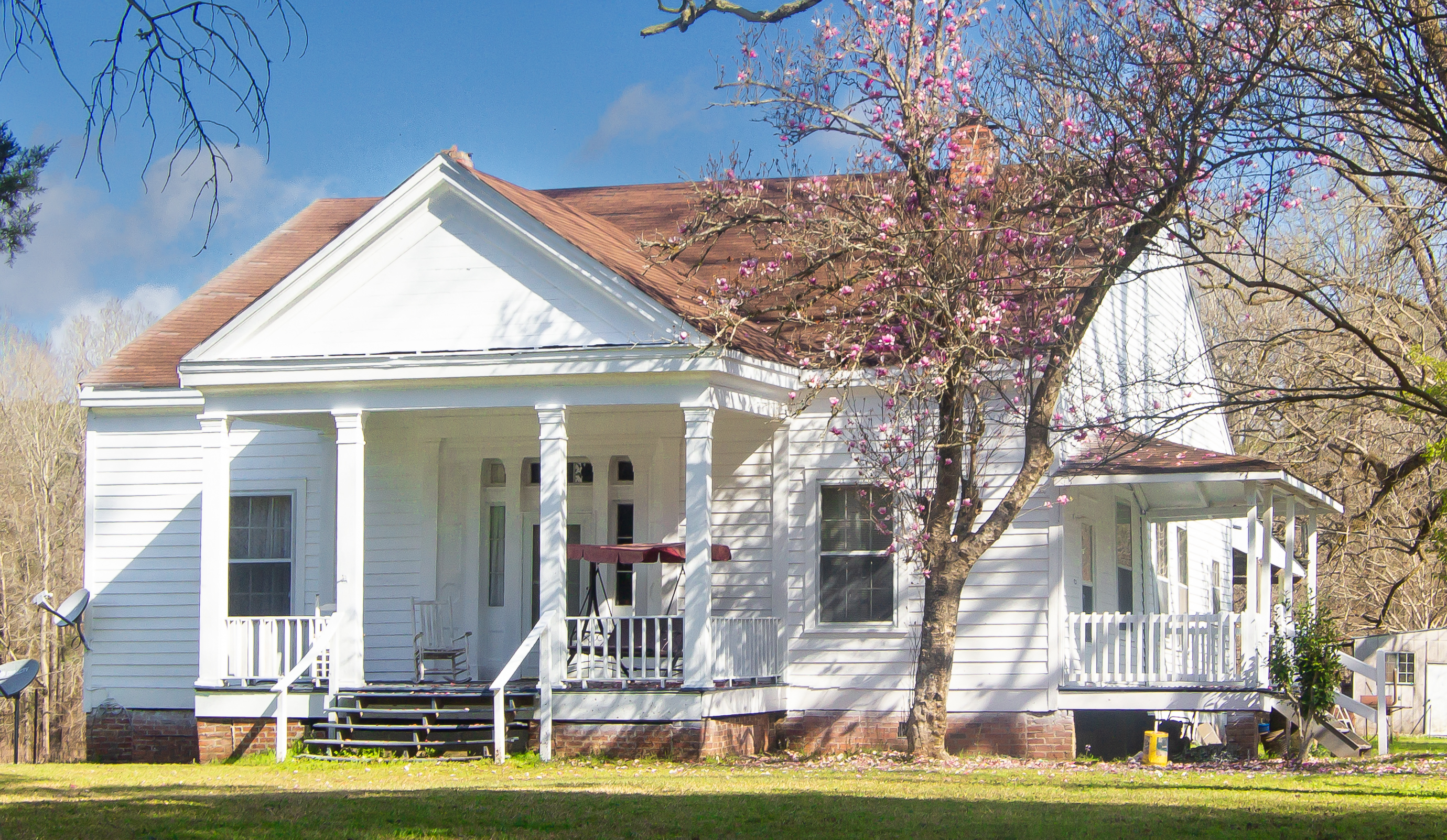

- Location within Mississippi Location within the United States
- Location: Pachuta, Mississippi
- Coordinates: 32°0′43″N 88°49′13″W
- Area: 4.9 acres (2.0 ha)
- Built: 1855; 171 years ago
- Built by: Hamilton, Elbert and Robert McGowan, slave labor
- Architectural style: Greek Revival
- MPS: Clarke County Antebellum Houses TR
- NRHP reference No.: 80002229
- Added to NRHP: May 22, 1980

The Forestdale Plantation, also known as the McGowan-Fatherree Plantation, is a historic plantation in Pachuta, Mississippi, US. It was built from 1855 to 1857 with the forced labor of enslaved people for three brothers, Hamilton, Elbert and Robert McGowan. It has been listed on the National Register of Historic Places since May 22, 1980.
