= Capt. C.C. Ferrill House =

- Capt. C. C. Ferrill House
- U.S. National Register of Historic Places
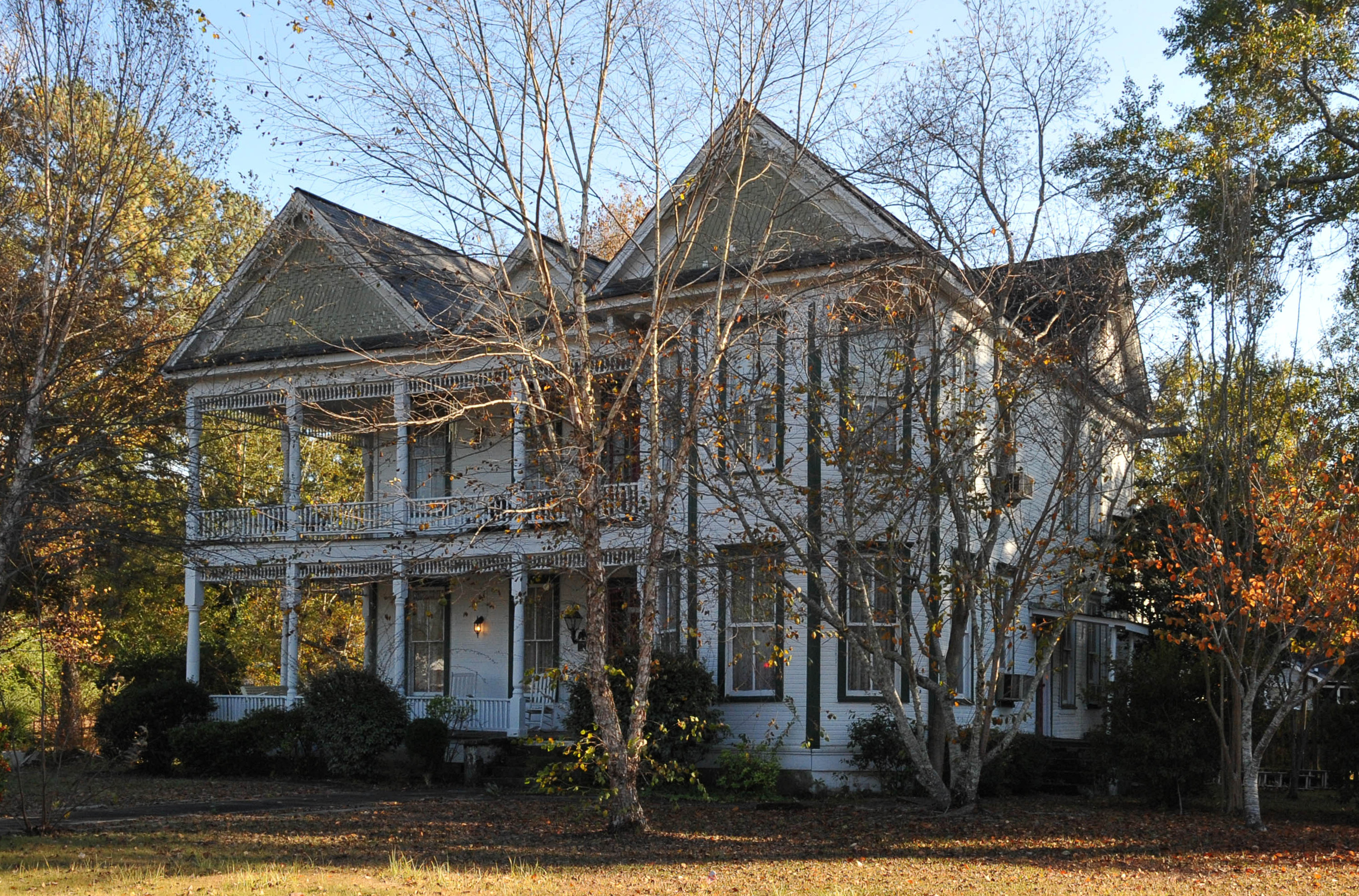
- The Capt. C.C. Ferrill House in 2008

- Location within Mississippi
- Location: 118 East Franklin Street, Quitman, Mississippi
- Coordinates: 32°02′09″N 88°43′31″W
- Area: less than one acre
- Built: 1900
- Architectural style: Queen Anne
- MPS: Clarke County MPS
- NRHP reference No.: 94000509
- Added to NRHP: May 20, 1994

The Capt. C.C. Ferrill House is a historic house in Quitman, Mississippi. It was built in 1900 for Captain C. C. Ferrill, who served as the clerk of Clarke County's chancery court. It was acquired by the Kirkland family in 1910.

The house was designed in the Queen Anne architectural style. It has been listed on the National Register of Historic Places since May 20, 1994.
