= Judge John L. Buckley House =

Historic house in Mississippi, United States

- U.S. National Register of Historic Places
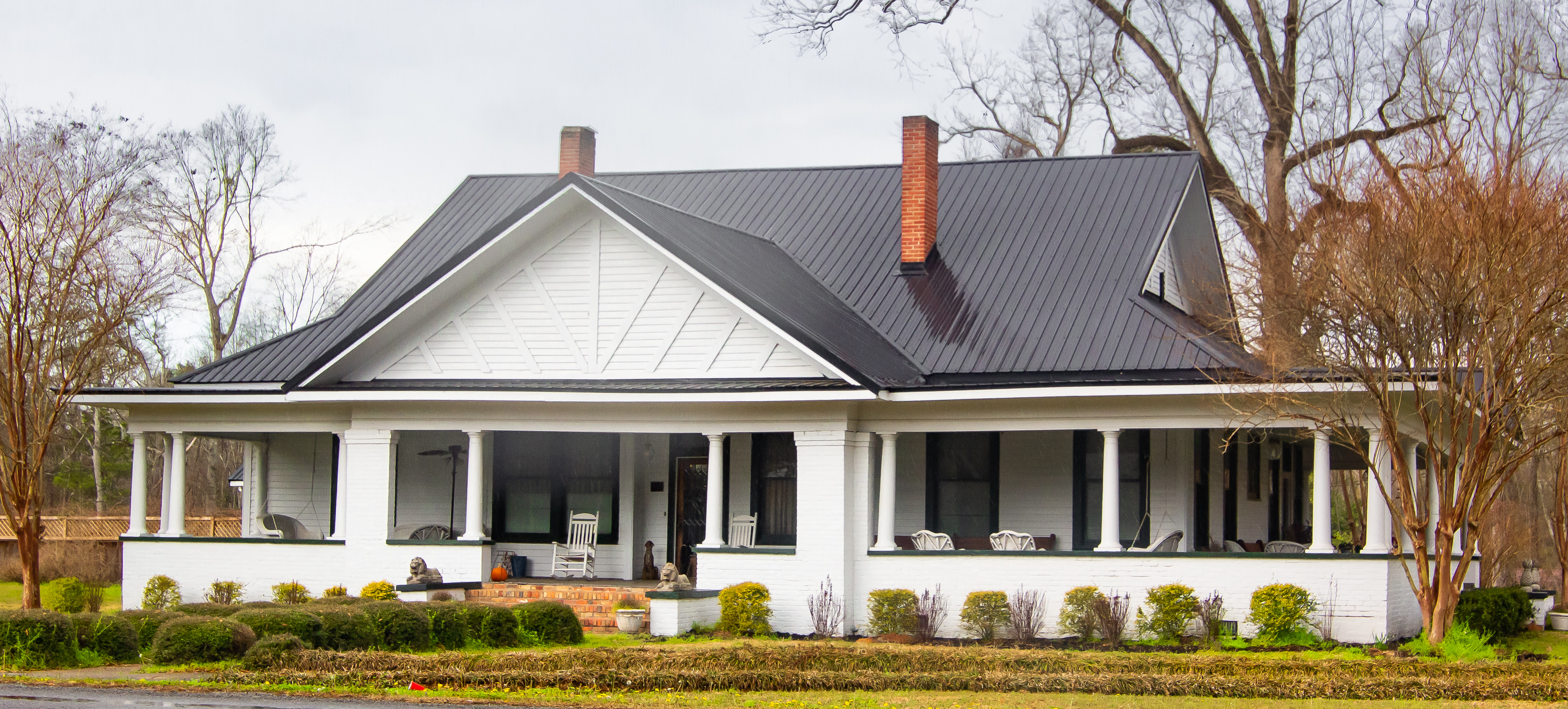

- Location within Mississippi Location within the United States
- Location: Enterprise, Clarke County, Mississippi
- Coordinates: 32°10′33″N 88°49′29″W
- Built: 1897
- Architectural style: Bungalow/Craftsman
- MPS: Clarke County MPS
- NRHP reference No.: 94000513
- Added to NRHP: May 20, 1994

The Judge John L. Buckley House is a house in Enterprise, Mississippi listed on the National Register of Historic Places. The house is built in the bungalow style. Many of the bungalows built in Clarke County in the 1920s were one-story, undistinguished standardized housing. The Buckley House is more notable than these because of its detailing, which incorporated Colonial design elements. It is also somewhat larger, being one and a half stories tall, and it has a low-pitched roof with broad gables and a wraparound porch. It incorporates traditional design elements into a more modern residential design, and is one of the most sophisticated bungalow designs in Clarke County.
