= James Yates (activist) =

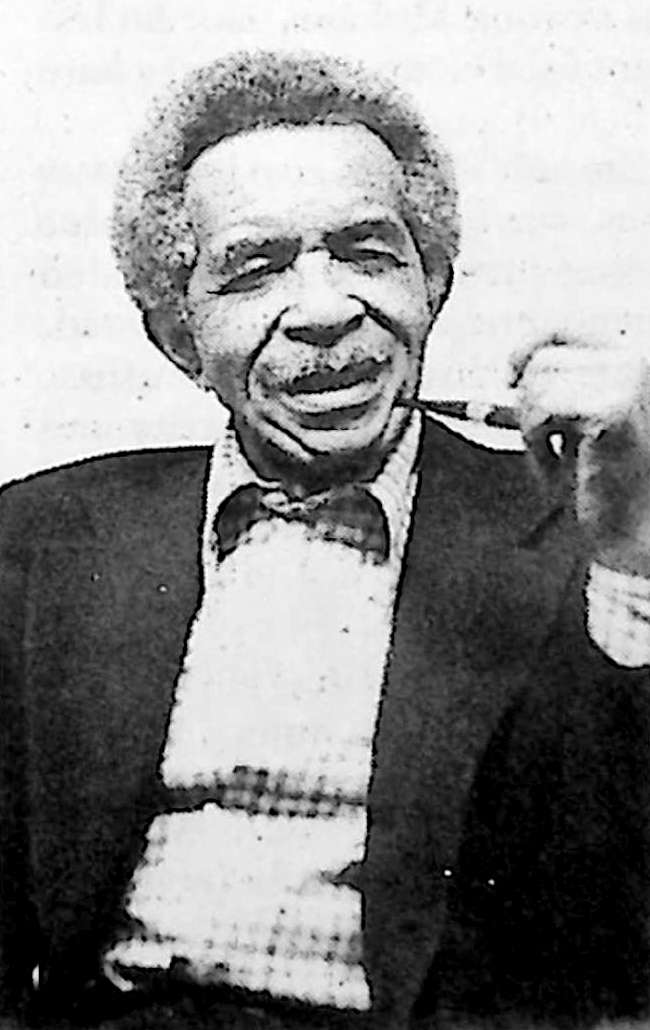
- Yates c. 1979
- Born: August 9, 1906; Quitman, Mississippi, U.S.
- Died: November 7, 1993 (aged 87); New York City, New York, U.S.
- Political party: Communist Party USA

James Yates (August 9, 1906, Quitman, Mississippi – November 7, 1993, New York City, New York) was an African American anti-fascist who fought in the Spanish Civil War as a soldier in the Abraham Lincoln Brigade.

== Biography ==
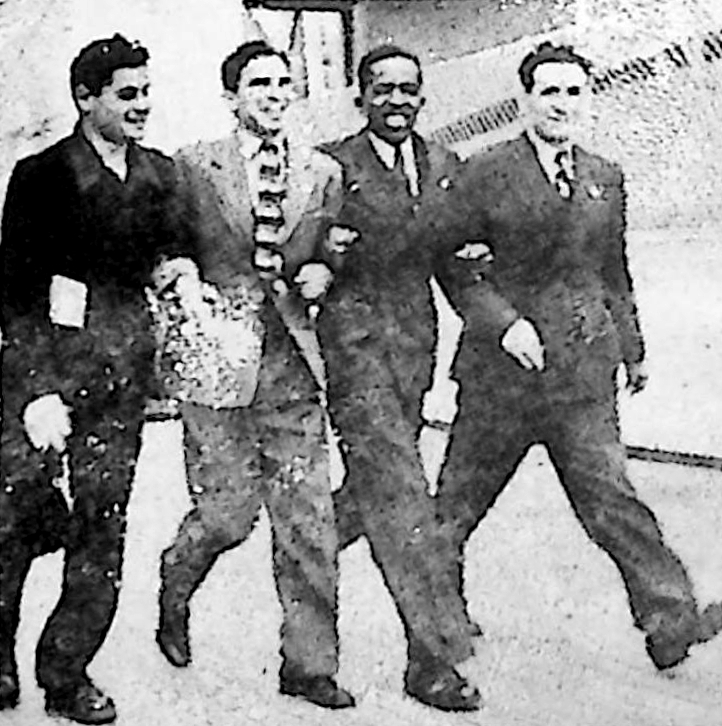
Four Lincoln Brigade veterans return to the United States from Spain, 1938. (L-R): Frank Feingersh, Bill Bois, James Yates and Joe Drice.

Yates grew up in Quitman, Mississippi, as the son of sharecroppers. His grandmother had been a slave in Mississippi. He went to Chicago at the age of 16 and found work as a meatpacker.

He participated in the movement to protest the Scottsboro Case and became active in the Unemployed Councils organized by the Communist Party USA. He joined the Communist Party USA in 1936.

In 1937, Yates went to Spain, where he served as an ammunition and ambulance driver. He was wounded twice. In Spain he met Langston Hughes and Ernest Hemingway. Arriving in New York City on December 15, 1938, alongside 147 other American volunteers, after the disbandment of the International Brigades, Yates was turned away due to his race from the hotel which had been booked for returning volunteers by Lincoln supporters. Speaking about the experience of discrimination following the equality he had experienced while serving in Spain, he said "the pain went deeply as any bullet could have done."

During World War II he served in the United States Army. He struggled to find work in the 1950s due to McCarthyism.

In 1989 he published a memoir about his experiences in Spain, Mississippi to Madrid: Memoir of a Black American in the Abraham Lincoln Brigade.
