= Annibel Jenkins =

American scholar

- Annibel Jenkins, as a high school student, from a 1934 newspaper.
- Born: March 4, 1918; Shubuta, Mississippi
- Died: March 20, 2013; Atlanta, Georgia
- Occupation(s): Scholar, professor, writer

Annibel Jenkins (March 4, 1918 – March 20, 2013) was an American college professor and scholar of the eighteenth century.

== Early life ==
Annibel Jenkins was born in Shubuta, Mississippi, and raised in Whiteville, Tennessee, Forest and Lucedale, Mississippi, the daughter of George Shaeffer Jenkins and Lona Belle Miley Jenkins. Her father was a Baptist minister. She graduated from Blue Mountain College in 1938 with a bachelor of arts degree and a diploma in piano performance. She earned a master's degree at Baylor University. She completed doctoral studies at the University of North Carolina at Chapel Hill in 1965, with a dissertation titled "A Study of the Post-Angel, 1701-1702".

== Career ==
Jenkins taught at various southern colleges during her graduate studies, including Central Baptist College in Arkansas, the University of Alabama, the University of Florida, and Wake Forest University. She also taught piano at Blue Mountain College.

Jenkins was named head of the English department at Belhaven College in 1959. She was a professor of English at Georgia Institute of Technology for most of her career. She was a founding member of the American Society for Eighteenth-Century Studies (ASECS) and the Southeastern American Society for Eighteenth-Century Studies (SEASECS).

She wrote several books, including I'll Tell You What: The Life of Elizabeth Inchbald (2003), Nicholas Rowe (1977), and Paradise Garden: A Trip Through Howard Finster's Visionary World (1996, with her nephew Robert Peacock).

== Personal life and legacy ==
Annibel Jenkins died in 2013, aged 95 years, in Atlanta. The Annibel Jenkins Biography Prize was established by ASECS in 1997. Notable winners have included Richard Wendorf (1997), Nicholas Boyle (2002), George M. Marsden (2004), Allan Greer (2006), Douglas Smith (2010), and Jane Kamensky (2017). The Annibel Jenkins Prize in Performance and Theater Studies was established in 2012 by SEASECS, for an article-length work on eighteenth-century theatre or performance.
