= Carmichael, Mississippi =

- Unincorporated community
- Location within Mississippi Location within the United States
- Coordinates: 31°57′06″N 88°35′05″W
- Country: United States
- State: Mississippi
- County: Clarke
- Elevation: 331 ft (101 m)
- Time zone: UTC-6 (Central (CST))
  - Summer (DST): UTC-5 (CDT)
- Area codes: 601 & 769
- GNIS feature ID: 668067

Carmichael is an unincorporated community in Clarke County, Mississippi, United States.

== History ==
Carmichael was once home to a school and general store.

A post office operated under the name Carmichael from 1887 to 1956.
