= Blue Mountain Christian University =

Baptist university in Blue Mountain, Mississippi, US

Coordinates: 34°40′19″N 89°1′45″W

- Former names: Blue Mountain Female Institute (1873–1876); Blue Mountain Female College (1910–1955); Blue Mountain College (1955–2022)
- Type: Private college
- Established: 1873
- Religious affiliation: Southern Baptist (Mississippi Baptist Convention)
- President: Barbara McMillin
- Students: 450
- Location: Blue Mountain, Mississippi, United States
- Campus: 189.61 acres; Rural
- Colors: Navy Blue, Light Blue & Gold
- Nickname: Toppers
- Sporting affiliations: NAIA – SSAC
- Mascot: Ram
- Website: www.bmc.edu

Blue Mountain Christian University (BMCU), formerly Blue Mountain College, is a private Baptist college in Blue Mountain, Mississippi. Founded as a women's college in 1873, the college's board of trustees voted unanimously for the college to become coeducational in 2005. The university offers baccalaureate degrees as well as graduate programs.

== History ==
Blue Mountain Female College

By 1873, the college was founded as a woman's college by Confederate Brigadier-General Mark Perrin Lowrey, a pastor who was known as "a preacher general" during the war. Blue Mountain Female Institute, as it was called at first, started with 50 students with Lowrey and his two daughters serving as the faculty. In 1877, the college was officially chartered by the State of Mississippi. Lowrey, his sons W. T. and B. G., and grandson Lawrence Lowrey all served as the first four presidents. By 1910, the institution was using the name Blue Mountain Female College.

After the sudden death of President Lowrey in 1960, a longtime professor at the school, Wilfred Tyler, became the first non-Lowrey family president followed by E. Harold Fisher in 1965. Bettye Rogers Coward served as the seventh president from 2001 to 2012. Janice I. Nicholson, a BMC alumna, served as transitional president prior to Barbara Childers McMillin's becoming the eighth president on August 1, 2012.

Originally an independently owned institution, the college was turned over to the Mississippi Baptist Convention in 1920 by the Lowrey Family. It remained focused on women's education until 1956 when a program to train men for church-related vocations was started. In October 2005, the college's board of trustees voted to make the school fully coeducational. On November 4, 2022, the college was renamed Blue Mountain Christian University to distinguish the institution from two-year community colleges and to highlight its Christian identity and mission.

== Athletics ==
The Blue Mountain Christian (BMCU) athletic teams are called the Toppers. The college is a member of the National Association of Intercollegiate Athletics (NAIA), primarily competing in the Southern States Athletic Conference (SSAC; formerly known as Georgia–Alabama–Carolina Conference (GACC) until after the 2003–04 school year) since the 2013–14 academic year. The Toppers previously competed in the TranSouth Athletic Conference (TranSouth or TSAC) from 1996–97 to 2012–13.

Men's sports began competition in the 2007–08 academic year, when the school became co-educational.

BMCU competes in 18 intercollegiate sports: Men's sports include baseball, basketball, bowling, cross country, golf, soccer, tennis and track & field; while women's sports include basketball, bowling, cheerleading, cross country, golf, soccer, softball, tennis, track & field and volleyball. Club sports include men's & women's archery, bass fishing and powerlifting.

== Notable alumni ==
- Dusti Bongé - artist
- George Duke Humphrey - 9th president of Mississippi State University
- Annibel Jenkins - English scholar, professor at Georgia Tech
