= Oseola McCarty =

American philanthropist (1908–1999)

Personal details
- Born: March 7, 1908 Shubuta, Mississippi, US
- Died: September 26, 1999 (aged 91) Hattiesburg, Mississippi, US

Oseola McCarty (March 7, 1908 – September 26, 1999) was a local washerwoman in Hattiesburg, Mississippi who became The University of Southern Mississippi's (USM) most famous benefactor.

McCarty drew global attention after it was announced in July 1995 that she had established a trust through which at her death, a portion of her life's savings would be left to the university to provide scholarships for deserving students in need of financial assistance. The amount was estimated at $150,000, a surprising amount given her low-paid occupation.

== Personal ==
McCarty was born in Shubuta, Mississippi and moved to Hattiesburg as a child.

In her sixth grade, her aunt (who had no children of her own) was hospitalized and later needed home care, so McCarty quit school, never to return. She later became a washerwoman, like her grandmother, a trade that she continued until arthritis forced her to quit in 1994.

McCarty's grandmother died in 1944, followed by her mother in 1964 and her aunt in 1967. McCarty never married or had children.

McCarty died from liver cancer in 1999.

== Frugality ==
Even before dropping out of school, McCarty was taught to save money by her mother. She opened her first savings account at First Mississippi National Bank, and over the years, she opened several other accounts at various area banks, including Trustmark National Bank, which she appointed trustee of her trust and executor of her estate.

McCarty never owned a car; she walked everywhere she went, pushing a shopping cart nearly a mile to get groceries. She rode with friends to attend services at the Friendship Baptist Church. She did not subscribe to any newspaper and considered the expense an extravagance. Similarly, although she owned a black-and white-television, she received only broadcast transmissions. In 1947, her uncle gave her the house in which she lived until her death. She also received some money from her aunt and mother when they died, which she placed into savings as well.

== Gift ==
Over time, Trustmark Bank personnel noticed McCarty's accumulated savings and began to assist her in future estate planning as well as be unofficial guardians for her. (Bank employees and other friends convinced McCarty to purchase two small window air conditioners for her house and cable television service.)

With the assistance of a local attorney, for whom she had done laundry, and the bank's trust officer, using slips of paper and dimes, to represent 10% shares, McCarty set out the future distribution of her estate. She set aside one dime (10%) for her church, one dime (10%) each for three relatives, and the remaining dimes (60%) for the University of Southern Mississippi. She stipulated that the funds should be used for students, preferably those of African-American descent, who could not otherwise attend due to financial hardship. When news of McCarty's plan was made public, local leaders immediately funded an endowment in her honor.

She signed an irrevocable trust, allowing the bank to manage her funds from which she received a regular check.

== Honoraria ==
In 1998, she was awarded an honorary degree from USM, the first such degree awarded by the university. She received scores of awards and other honors recognizing her selfless spirit, and President Bill Clinton presented her with a Presidential Citizens Medal, the nation’s second-highest civilian award, during a special White House ceremony. She also won the United Nations' Avicenna Prize for educational commitment. In June 1996, Harvard University awarded McCarty an honorary doctorate alongside Maya Lin, Walter Annenberg and Judith Jamison. In December, her hand was on the switch that dropped the countdown ball in Times Square on New Year's Eve. It was her first time sleeping in a hotel, and first ride in an airplane.

In 1997, McCarty received the Award for Greatest Public Service Benefiting the Disadvantaged, an award given out annually by Jefferson Awards.

McCarty was also recognized with an Essence Award in 1997, and Patti LaBelle sang tribute to her during the ceremony at Madison Square Garden in New York.

The University of Southern Mississippi Foundation honored the life and legacy of Oseola McCarty on Thursday, October 8, 2020. In recognition of the 25th anniversary of McCarty’s unexpected planned gift to the university, a virtual celebration featured interviews with special guests and the unveiling of a sculpture.
