= Energy, Mississippi =

Energy
- Unincorporated community
- Location within the state of Mississippi
- Coordinates: 32°10′47″N 88°32′59″W
- Country: United States
- State: Mississippi
- County: Clarke
- Elevation: 420 ft (130 m)
- Time zone: UTC-6 (Central (CST))
  - Summer (DST): UTC-5 (CDT)
- GNIS feature ID: 669778

Energy is an unincorporated community in Clarke County, Mississippi, United States.

The population was 27 in 1900.

Energy had a post office until 1910.
