= Homer Smith Jr =

Writer and journalist

- Born: 1909; Quitman, Mississippi, USA
- Died: 1972 (aged 62–63); Chicago, Illinois, USA
- Occupation: Journalist

Homer Smith Jr (1909–1972) was an American journalist and postal worker. He moved from the United States to the Soviet Union in 1932.

== Biography ==
Smith was born in Mississippi.

Homer Smith Jr. studied journalism at the University of Minnesota between 1922 and 1928, financing his schooling while working for the U.S. Post Office as a clerk. Upon graduation, Smith struggled to find a job at a major newspaper. He visited the Moscow as a member of the cast of the film Black and White in June 1932. He found full time employment there in the Soviet Union's postal service in Moscow's Commissariat of Posts and Telegraphs as an inspector and consultant, working towards a reorganization of their service.

While working in the Soviet postal service, Smith was a journalist in the Associated Negro Press. He wrote columns under the pen name "Chatwood Hall" and his real name that were published in papers including The Chicago Defender, The Crisis and The Afro-American, including a weekly column for the Defender in at least December 1934. Three years later Smith married Maria Petrovna. He gained Russian citizenship in 1938.

When Germany invaded Russia in the summer of 1941, he became a full-time war correspondent for the Associated Negro Press. His reporting on the Second World War was described as making him the first African American war correspondent. in 1944 he became half of the two-person Associated Press team in Moscow. In January 1944, he was part of the delegation of Western correspondents who visited the graves in Katyn forest at the invitation of the Soviets. However, he did not publish an article about the trip to Katyn. In his memoirs he wrote that he had had doubts about the Soviet version that the Germans had been the perpetrators.

Smith left Russia for Ethiopia in 1946, where he worked for the Ethiopian Press Service; he never returned to the Soviet Union. He returned to the United States in 1963, and published an autobiography the following year titled Black Man in Red Russia, focusing on his time in Russia. Homer Smith died in Chicago on August 14, 1972.
