= W. S. Carmichael House =

Historic house in Michigan, United States

- U.S. National Register of Historic Places
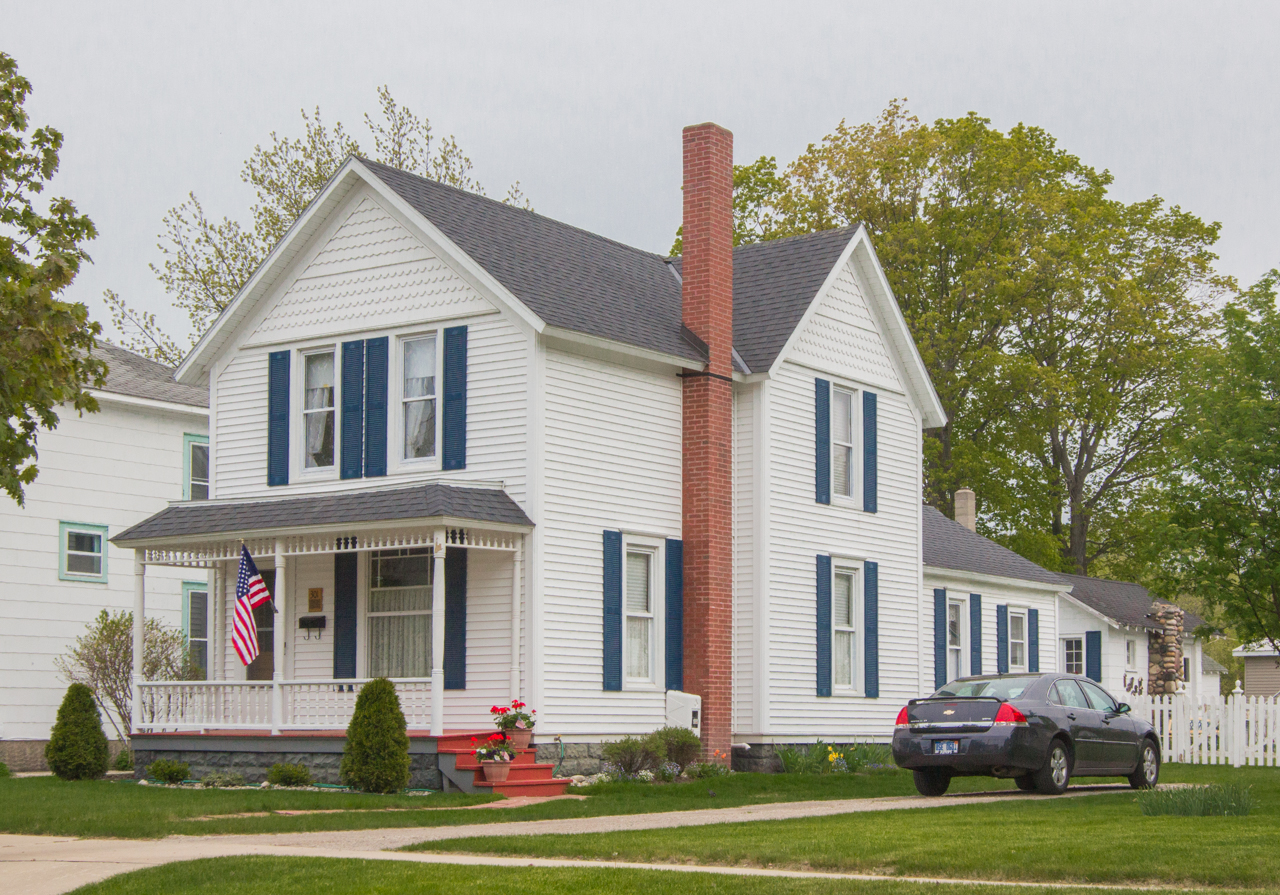

- Location within Michigan Location within the United States
- Interactive map
- Location: 301 Jackson St., Petoskey, Michigan
- Coordinates: 45°22′16″N 84°57′50″W
- Area: 0.3 acres (0.12 ha)
- Architectural style: Queen Anne
- MPS: Petoskey MRA
- NRHP reference No.: 86001977
- Added to NRHP: September 10, 1986

The W. S. Carmichael House is a private house located at 301 Jackson Street in Petoskey, Michigan. It was placed on the National Register of Historic Places in 1986.

The W. S. Carmichael House is a two-story cross-gabled Queen Anne building with a single story shed-roofed addition filling the angle of the walls in the rear. The single story front porch has a truncated hipped roof, and has decorative turned elements. The building is covered with clapboard, with the gables ornamented with decorative fishscale shingles. he windows are one-over-one double-hung units with cornices above.

This house was constructed by 1899, and is associated with W.S. Carmichael, a carpenter who lived in the house for many years.
