= Richard Wendorf =

American and British art historian

Professor Richard Wendorf
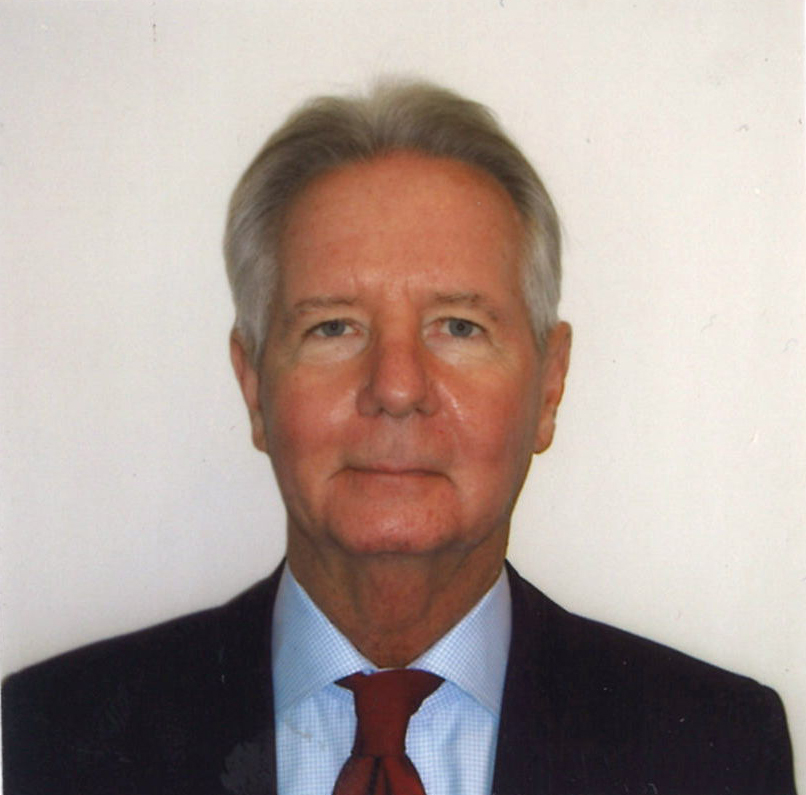
- Director of the American Museum & Gardens
- Born: 1948 (age 77–78); USA
- Education: Williams College, Worcester College, Oxford, Princeton University
- Term: 2010–2021
- Predecessor: Sandra Barghini
- Successor: Gareth Thomas

Richard Harold Wendorf (born 17 March 1948) is an American and British art historian, literary critic, and museum and library director. He served as the director of the American Museum & Gardens near Bath, England (formerly the American Museum in Britain) from January 2010 until his retirement in December 2021.

Before this, Wendorf was the Stanford Calderwood Director and Librarian of the Boston Athenaeum, the Librarian (director) of Harvard University's Houghton Library, and Professor of English and art history at Northwestern University. His book on Sir Joshua Reynolds won the biennial Annibel Jenkins Biography Prize from the American Society for Eighteenth-Century Studies. His most recent book is The Perils of Politeness: A Life of Lord Chesterfield.

== Career ==
Wendorf began his academic career in the English department at Northwestern University: as assistant professor (1976–1981), associate professor (1981–1985), and professor (1985–1989). In 1985 he was also made a professor of art history. He served for four years as the associate dean for undergraduate studies in the College of Arts and Sciences at Northwestern (1984–1988) and was awarded a Distinguished Teaching Prize in 1978.

Wendorf became Librarian (now the Florence Fearrington Librarian) of the Houghton Library at Harvard in 1989, and also served as senior lecturer on the fine arts. Founded in 1942, the Houghton Library is the principal rare-book library at Harvard University and one of the most important collections of its kind in the world, with significant holdings in American, British, and European rare books, literary and historical manuscripts, printing and graphic arts, and theatre history. Wendorf led the library through its fiftieth anniversary with several exhibitions and publications, the acquisition of the Houghton Mifflin archive, and an international symposium on the future of rare book and manuscript libraries.

In 1997 he moved to the Boston Athenæum, serving for 12 years as the director and librarian. Founded in 1807, it is one of the nation's oldest cultural institutions. With 7,000 members and collections that include 600,000 books and significant holdings of prints, photographs, paintings, statues, and manuscripts, the Athenæum is a center for scholarly research as well as a resource for students, writers, and families. The Athenæum completed a $30-million renovation and expansion project and a matching capital campaign in 2002; in 2007 it celebrated its bicentennial with a series of exhibitions and publications, including "Boston Collects" at the Grolier Club in New York.

After retiring from the Boston Athenaeum in 2009, Wendorf was named Director of the American Museum and Gardens, arriving at Bath, England, in January 2010. Founded in 1961, the museum is located in Claverton Manor on the outskirts of Bath. The museum specializes in American decorative arts and folk art, and the manor house, designed by Sir Jeffry Wyatville in 1820, contains a series of period rooms documenting American domestic history from the colonial period through the late nineteenth century. The museum hosts an annual exhibition as well as numerous lectures, concerts, workshops, and historical re-enactments throughout the year. Its Folk Art Gallery, Stables, and Coach House were opened in 2011 during its 50th-anniversary year. 2018 saw the completion of the New American Garden, an award-winning garden designed by Oehme, van Sweden & Associates.

Wendorf was appointed Visiting Professor at Bath Spa University in 2014. He was Visiting Fellow of Exeter College, Oxford, in 2019.

== Biography ==
Wendorf was born in Cedar Rapids, Iowa, the son of Harold Albert Wendorf, a retail executive, and Jeanne Hamblin Wendorf, a homemaker and volunteer. His younger brother, James, served as executive director of the National Center for Learning Disabilities in New York City.

Wendorf was educated at Washington High School in Cedar Rapids, Williams College (BA 1970), the University of Oxford (MPhil 1972), and Princeton University (MA 1974, PhD 1976). He was the Carroll Wilson Scholar at Worcester College, Oxford, from 1970 to 1972.

Elected a Fellow of the Society of Antiquaries of London (FSA) in 2006, he is a member of the Athenaeum Club (London), where he chaired the Works of Art Committee. He is a trustee of Bath Mozartfest. Wendorf served as a trustee of the Bath Royal Literary and Scientific Institution and of the American Museum. He was on the board of managers of the Lewis Walpole Library (Yale University). He previously served as a trustee of the Museum of Fine Arts, Boston (1999–2009), the Latin School of Chicago (1986–89), and the Shady Hill School, Cambridge, Massachusetts (1998–2000).

Wendorf has held research fellowships from the John Simon Guggenheim Memorial Foundation, the National Endowment for the Humanities (at the Newberry Library), the American Council of Learned Societies (senior and junior fellowships), the Folger Shakespeare Library, the Yale Center for British Art, the Huntington Library, the British Academy, and the American Philosophical Society. He served for several years as a Phi Beta Kappa Lecturer and has twice returned to teach at Williams College as a visiting associate professor of English and as the Robert Sterling Clark Visiting Professor of Art History.

When at Harvard, Wendorf served on the National Committee on the Arts, which established guidelines for the study of art, music, dance, and theater in secondary schools in the United States. He directed six Summer Seminars for College and University Teachers on relations between literature and the visual arts, funded by the National Endowment for the Humanities.

In 2009 Wendorf was honored by the Gibson House Museum for his contributions to the cultural life of Boston, and at the end of that year an endowed exhibition fund was created in his honor at the Boston Athenaeum. He delivered the commencement address at Bath Spa University (2011) and at Wiltshire College (2012).

Wendorf has two children with his former wife Diana French. He currently lives in Bath with his civil partner, Elizabeth Hilliar.

== Published works ==
Wendorf has specialized in British portraiture, eighteenth-century English literature, the interrelations of literature and the visual arts, and the history of libraries and museums. He is also the author of two murder mysteries, The Subtle Thief and The Man Who Looked Too Closely.

=== Books ===
- The Perils of Politeness: A Life of Lord Chesterfield (London: Reaktion Books, 2026) ISBN 978-1836392637
- The Man Who Looked Too Closely (Canterbury: Conrad Press, 2025) ISBN 191696690X
- The Subtle Thief (Canterbury: Conrad Press, 2023) ISBN 978-1916966079
- Printing History and Cultural Change: Fashioning the Modern English Text in Eighteenth-Century England Oxford University Press, 2022
- Face to Face with Angela Conner (Bath: American Museum & Gardens, 2018) ISBN 978-1527228726
- Growing Up Bookish: An Anglo-American Memoir (New Castle DE: Oak Knoll Press, 2017) ISBN 978-1584563587
- The Three Laws of Portraiture Thornwillow Press, 2015
- Director's Choice: The American Museum in Britain (London: Scala Publishers, 2012) ISBN 9781857597721
- The Literature of Collecting & Other Essays (Boston Athenæum; New Castle DE: Oak Knoll Press, 2008).
- After Sir Joshua: Essays on British Art and Cultural History (New Haven and London: Yale Univ. Press, 2005).
- The Scholar-Librarian: Books, Libraries, and the Fine Arts (Boston Athenæum; New Castle DE: Oak Knoll Press, 2005).
- Greene, Harlan, review, College and Research Libraries. (January 2006) pp.94-95.
- Sir Joshua Reynolds: The Painter in Society (Cambridge: Harvard Univ. Press; London: National Portrait Gallery, 1996).
- The Elements of Life: Biography and Portrait-Painting in Stuart and Georgian England (Oxford: Clarendon Press, 1990).
- William Collins and Eighteenth-Century Poetry (Minneapolis: Univ. of Minnesota Press, 1981).
- The Works of William Collins, ed. with Charles Ryskamp (Oxford: Clarendon Press, 1979).

=== Edited collections ===
- The Boston Athenæum: Bicentennial Essays (Boston Athenæum, 2009).
- America’s Membership Libraries (New Castle DE: Oak Knoll Press, 2007).
- Rare Book and Manuscript Libraries in the Twenty-First Century (Cambridge: Harvard University Library, 1993).
- Visual and Verbal Portraiture (Word & Image 6.4, 1990).
- Articulate Images: The Sister Arts from Hogarth to Tennyson (Minneapolis: Univ. of Minnesota Press, 1983).
