= Shubuta, Mississippi =

- Town
- Flag

- Location of Shubuta, Mississippi

- Location in the United States
- Coordinates: 31°51′39″N 88°42′2″W
- Country: United States
- State: Mississippi
- County: Clarke

Area
  - Total: 2.41 sq mi (6.25 km^{2})
  - Land: 2.41 sq mi (6.25 km^{2})
  - Water: 0 sq mi (0.00 km^{2})
- Elevation: 203 ft (62 m)

Population (2020)
  - Total: 406
  - Density: 168.3/sq mi (64.97/km^{2})
- Time zone: UTC-6 (Central (CST))
  - Summer (DST): UTC-5 (CDT)
- ZIP code: 39360
- Area code: 601
- FIPS code: 28-67520
- GNIS feature ID: 0677756

Shubuta is a town in Clarke County, Mississippi, United States, which is located on the eastern border of the state. As of the 2020 census, Shubuta had a population of 406. Developed around an early 19th-century trading post on the Chickasawhay River, it was built near a Choctaw town. Shubuta is a Choctaw word meaning "smokey water".

== History ==
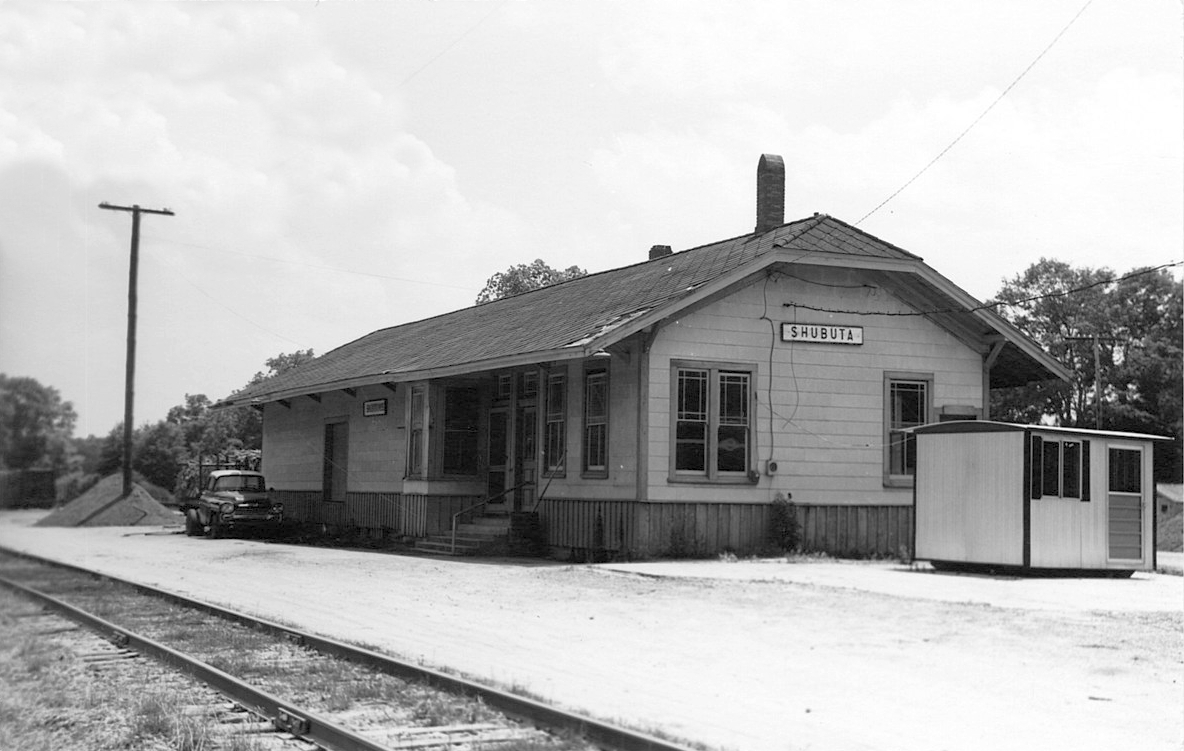
Shubuta railway depot, on the Gulf, Mobile and Ohio Railroad.

Located along the Chickasawhay River, the small town of Shubuta was incorporated in 1865. It had started in the 1830s as a trading post community, located near the Choctaw village of Yowani. During the period of Indian Removal, under the Treaty of Dancing Rabbit Creek, the Choctaw people ceded most of their lands to the United States. Under the Indian Removal Act, they were given land in exchange in Indian Territory (now Oklahoma), and most of the people were forced to relocate west of the Mississippi River. Their traditional homelands in the Southeast were sold or made available by lotteries to European Americans for settlement.

The first record of the word "Shubuta" appears on Bernard Roman's "Map of 1772", a copy of which appears in Riley's History of Mississippi. The name was spelled as "Chobuta", which means "smoky water" in the Choctaw language. It became a market town for an area developed for cotton plantations, which depended on the labor of enslaved African Americans. Cotton was shipped downriver from Shubuta to Mobile, Alabama, and then to other major ports. The town started growing more rapidly in the 1850s after being connected to other communities by the Mobile and Ohio Railroad. At one time the largest town between Meridian, Mississippi, and Mobile, Shubuta attracted people from 40 miles (64 km) around to shop at its many mercantile businesses.

The first newspaper in the area was the Mississippi Messenger, established in 1879 by Judge Charles A. Stovall. Six houses within Shubuta are listed on the National Register of Historic Places. These are listed in National Register of Historic Places listings in Clarke County, Mississippi, which provides a map link locating them all.

=== 20th-century lynchings ===
East of the town is a bridge over the river; it is known as the "Hanging Bridge". It was the site of the 20th-century lynch murders of four young Black people in 1918, two of whom were pregnant, and two 12-year-old boys in 1942. National newspapers covered the lynchings, and the NAACP conducted investigations in both cases. No one was prosecuted for the murders. In addition to recognition of historic houses in town, the Shubuta Bridge is listed on the National Register of Historic Places for its significance in state and national history. A total of 10 Black people were lynched in Clarke County from 1877 to 1950.

The county had 10 documented lynchings in the period from 1877 to 1950; most took place in the 20th century.

=== Voter suppression and Great Migration ===
At the end of the 19th and early 20th centuries, Mississippi disenfranchised most black voters through passing a new constitution that raised barriers to voter registration. In Shubuta whites had also suppressed black voting by destroying ballots, imposing poll tests such as correctly guessing the number of jellybeans in a jar, and intimidation by the Ku Klux Klan. Following the 1918 lynchings, many black workers left Clarke County, leaving cotton to rot in the fields. The town's population dropped by 21% (See table below) and the county population dropped 17% from 1910 to 1920. (See Demographics, Clarke County, Mississippi)

The first wave of the Great Migration from the rural South continued to the Second World War. In the 1930s, a number of African-American residents from the Shubuta area followed Reverend Louis W. Parson to Albany, New York to escape the violence and in a search for industrial jobs and better opportunities. They created a community to the west of the city, building houses along Rapp Road within what was one land parcel purchased by Parson. Now known as the Rapp Road Community Historic District, the area is listed on the NRHP.

== Geography ==
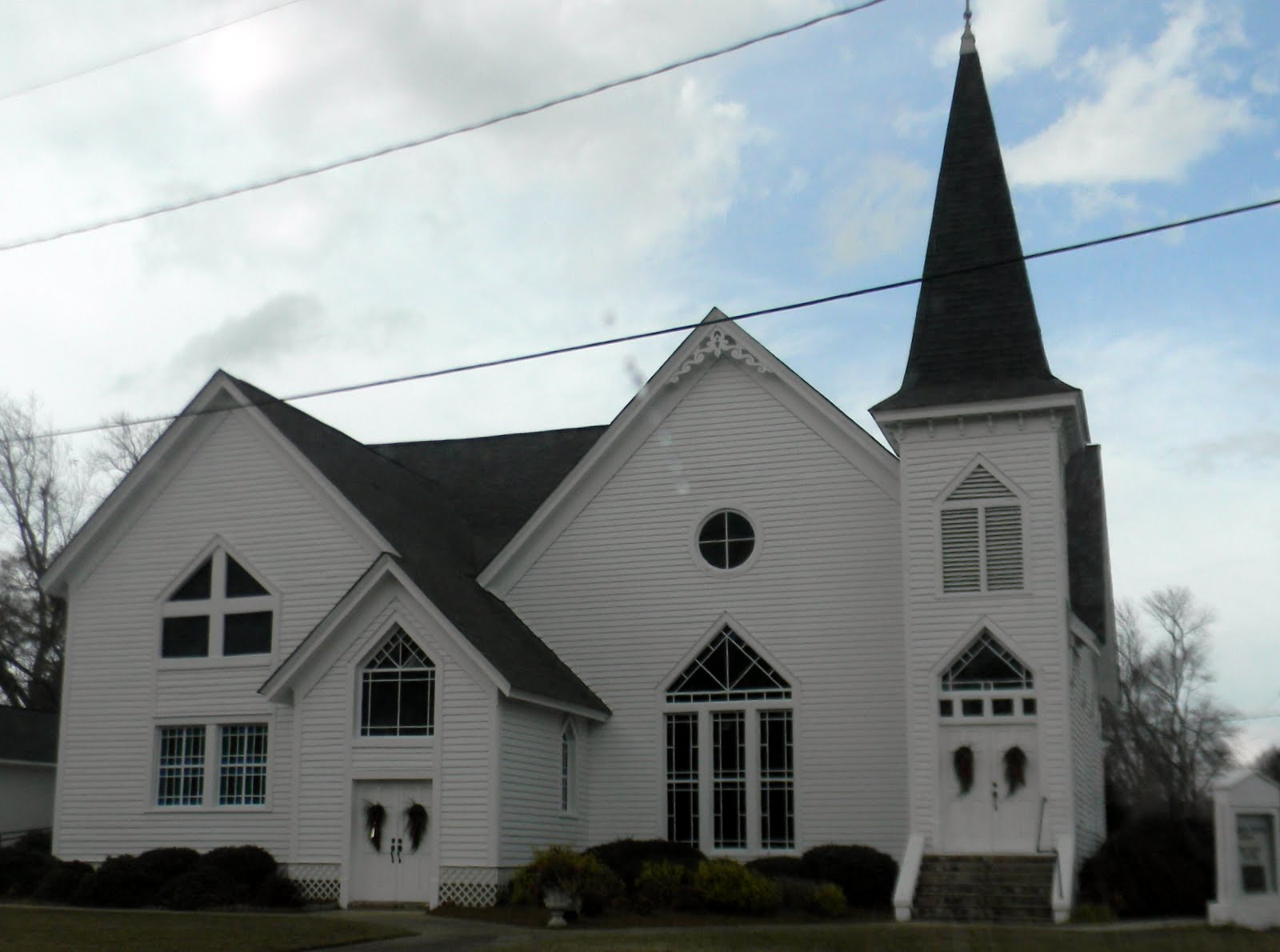
Shubuta Baptist Church

Shubuta is located near the southern border of Clarke County, on the west side of the Chickasawhay River. U.S. Route 45 bypasses the town on the west, leading north 13 miles (21 km) to Quitman, the county seat, and south 14 miles (23 km) to Waynesboro. Mississippi Highway 145, which leads through the center of Shubuta, follows the old alignment of US 45.

According to the United States Census Bureau, the town has a total area of 1,500 acres (6.2 km^{2}), all land.

== Demographics ==
Historical population
Census	Pop.	Note	%±
1880	754		—
1890	589		−21.9%
1900	451		−23.4%
1910	1,168		159.0%
1920	912		−21.9%
1930	720		−21.1%
1940	756		5.0%
1950	782		3.4%
1960	718		−8.2%
1970	602		−16.2%
1980	626		4.0%
1990	577		−7.8%
2000	651		12.8%
2010	441		−32.3%
2020	406		−7.9%
U.S. Decennial Census

=== Racial and ethnic composition ===
Shubuta town, Mississippi – Racial and ethnic composition Note: the US Census treats Hispanic/Latino as an ethnic category. This table excludes Latinos from the racial categories and assigns them to a separate category. Hispanics/Latinos may be of any race.
Race / Ethnicity (NH = Non-Hispanic)	Pop 2000	Pop 2010	Pop 2020	% 2000	% 2010	% 2020
White alone (NH)	166	101	62	25.50%	22.90%	15.27%
Black or African American alone (NH)	472	332	338	72.50%	75.28%	83.25%
Native American or Alaska Native alone (NH)	0	0	0	0.00%	0.00%	0.00%
Asian alone (NH)	0	0	0	0.00%	0.00%	0.00%
Native Hawaiian or Pacific Islander alone (NH)	0	0	0	0.00%	0.00%	0.00%
Other race alone (NH)	1	0	0	0.15%	0.00%	0.00%
Mixed race or Multiracial (NH)	3	1	2	0.46%	0.23%	0.49%
Hispanic or Latino (any race)	9	7	4	1.38%	1.59%	0.99%
Total	651	441	406	100.00%	100.00%	100.00%

=== 2020 census ===
As of the 2020 United States census, there were 406 people, 144 households, and 101 families residing in the town.

=== 2000 census ===
As of the census of 2000, there were 651 people, 244 households, and 165 families residing in the town. The population density was 271.0 inhabitants per square mile (104.6/km^{2}). There were 270 housing units at an average density of 112.4 per square mile (43.4/km^{2}). The racial makeup of the town was 25.50% White, 73.89% African American, 0.15% from other races, and 0.46% from two or more races. Hispanic or Latino of any race were 1.38% of the population.

There were 244 households, out of which 38.1% had children under the age of 18 living with them, 40.2% were married couples living together, 23.8% had a female householder with no husband present, and 32.0% were non-families. 28.7% of all households were made up of individuals, and 16.0% had someone living alone who was 65 years of age or older. The average household size was 2.67 and the average family size was 3.35.

In the town, the population was spread out, with 32.3% under the age of 18, 9.8% from 18 to 24, 26.1% from 25 to 44, 19.7% from 45 to 64, and 12.1% who were 65 years of age or older. The median age was 33 years. For every 100 females, there were 83.4 males. For every 100 females age 18 and over, there were 75.7 males.

The median income for a household in the town was $18,438, and the median income for a family was $21,719. Males had a median income of $24,688 versus $17,813 for females. The per capita income for the town was $9,094. About 38.5% of families and 44.8% of the population were below the poverty line, including 59.4% of those under age 18 and 35.9% of those age 65 or over.

== Economy ==
Shubuta was the second home of Hanson Scale Company, a bathroom scale manufacturer. It was later owned by the Sunbeam Corporation. Shubuta is the home of Mississippi Laminators. Producing laminated beams, the company has been in business here since the early 1970s.

== Education ==
Shubuta is served by the Quitman School District.

The county is in the zone for Jones College.

== Notable people ==
- Annibel Jenkins, Georgia Tech professor
- Oseola McCarty, philanthropist
- Tarvarius Moore, NFL strong safety
- Robert Staten, former NFL running back
- Gayle Graham Yates, women's studies and American studies academic
