= Shubuta Baptist Church =

Historic church in Mississippi, United States

- U.S. National Register of Historic Places
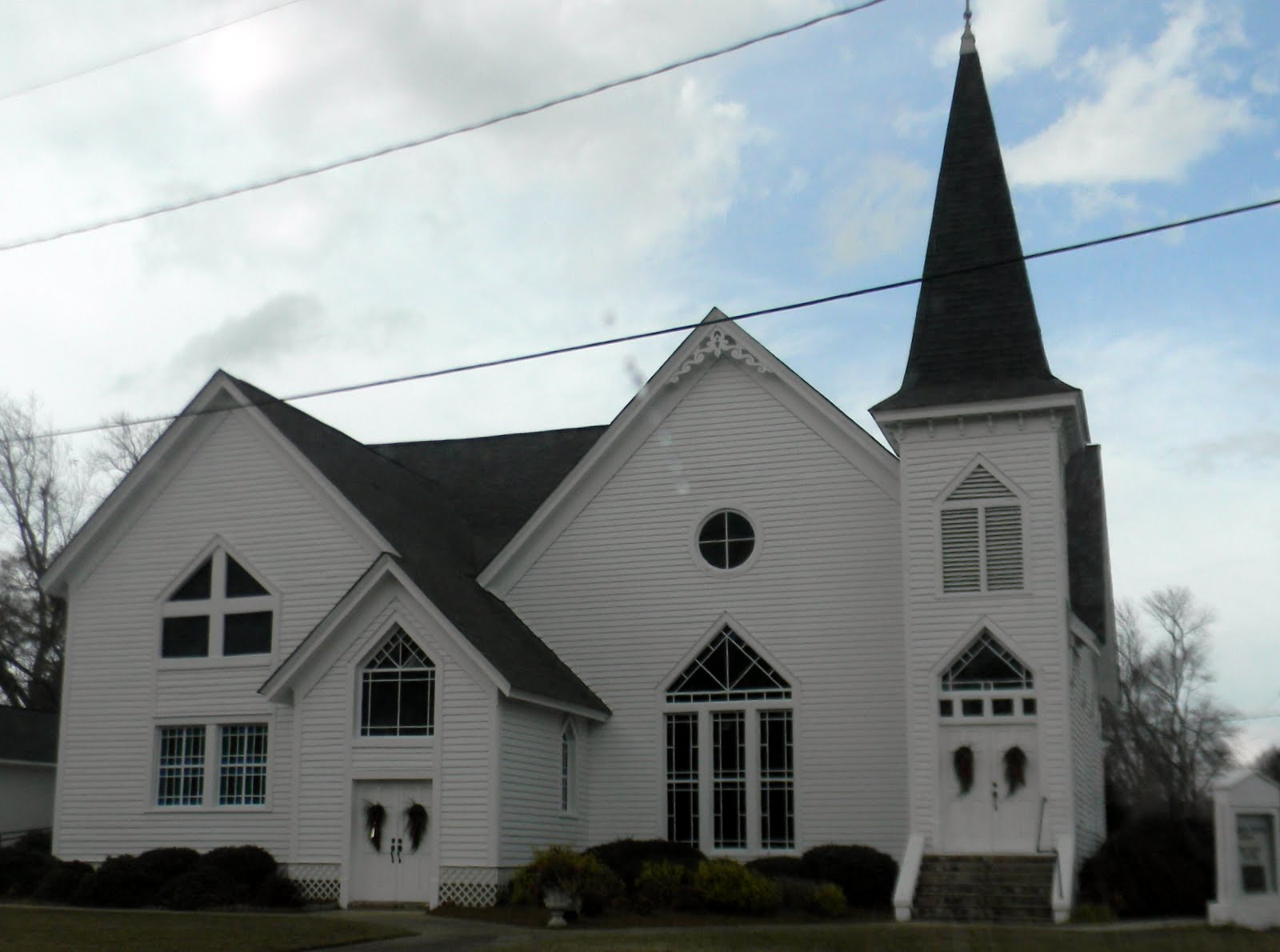

- Location within Mississippi Location within the United States
- Location: Eucutta St. at jct. with US 45, Shubuta, Mississippi
- Coordinates: 31°51′37″N 88°42′0″W
- Area: 1 acre (0.40 ha)
- Built: 1894
- Architectural style: Carpenter Gothic
- MPS: Clarke County MPS
- NRHP reference No.: 94000641
- Added to NRHP: June 24, 1994

Shubuta Baptist Church is a historic Southern Baptist church on Eucutta Street at the junction with U.S. Route 45 in Shubuta, Mississippi.

It was built in 1894 and added to the National Register in 1994.
