= Riverside Plantation (Enterprise, Mississippi) =

Historic house in Mississippi, United States

- U.S. National Register of Historic Places
- Location within Mississippi Location within the United States
- Location: SR 11, Enterprise, Clarke County, Mississippi
- Coordinates: 32°11′7″N 88°49′35″W
- Built: 1850
- Architectural style: Greek Revival
- MPS: Clarke County Antebellum Houses TR
- NRHP reference No.: 80002221
- Added to NRHP: May 22, 1980

Riverside Plantation in Enterprise, Clarke County, Mississippi was built in 1850. It was listed on the U.S. National Register of Historic Places in 1980. It is the sole two-story, Greek Revival plantation in Clarke County, Mississippi. It is said to have served as the headquarters for the Union forces during their occupation of Enterprise, Mississippi during the Civil War.
