= Gayle Graham Yates =

American women's studies and American studies academic (1940-2023)

- Born: Gayle Graham; May 6, 1940; Shubuta, Mississippi, U.S.
- Died: April 27, 2023 (aged 82); Minneapolis, Minnesota, U.S.
- Children: 2

Academic background
- Education: Millsaps College; Vanderbilt University; University of Minnesota

Academic work
- Discipline: American studies, women's studies
- Institutions: University of Minnesota

Gayle Graham Yates (née Graham; May 6, 1940 – April 27, 2023) was an American women's studies and American studies academic who helped establish the women's studies program at the University of Minnesota.

== Life ==
Yates was born on May 6, 1940, on a farm in Shubuta, Mississippi to Gleta and Robert Graham. She had an older brother. Members of the Methodist Episcopal Church, South, her mother was a teacher and her father a farmer. She earned a bachelor's degree from Millsaps College and a M.A. at Vanderbilt University. Yates completed studies at the Boston University School of Theology. Her first daughter was born in 1963 in Cambridge, Massachusetts. Yates and her husband Wilson moved to New Brighton, Minnesota where he worked at the United Theological Seminary of the Twin Cities (United). Her second child was born in Saint Paul, Minnesota in the fall of 1967. She earned a Ph.D. in American studies at the University of Minnesota.

For two years, Yates worked half time at both her alma mater and United. She later worked full time at the University of Minnesota, helping to create its women studies program. She served as its first full time faculty director and later chair. Yates was a feminist scholar. In 1982, Yates began teaching American studies until she retired.

Yates died on April 27, 2023, at her home in Minneapolis.

== Selected works ==
- Yates, Gayle Graham (1975). What Women Want: The Ideas of the Movement. Harvard University Press. ISBN 978-0-674-95077-1.
- Martineau, Harriet (1985). Yates, Gayle Grahm (ed.). Harriet Martineau on Women. Rutgers University Press. ISBN 978-0-8135-1057-6.
- Yates, Gayle Graham (1990). Mississippi Mind: A Personal Cultural History of an American State. Univ. of Tennessee Press. ISBN 978-0-87049-643-1.
- Yates, Gayle Graham (2004). Life and Death in a Small Southern Town: Memories of Shubuta, Mississippi. LSU Press. ISBN 978-0-8071-2937-1.
- Yates, Gayle Graham (2010). Ethics for Jessica: Meditations on Living. Wipf & Stock Publishers. ISBN 978-1-4982-5482-3.
