= De Soto, Mississippi =

- Census-designated place
- Location within Mississippi Location within the United States
- Coordinates: 31°58′26″N 88°42′48″W
- Country: United States
- State: Mississippi
- County: Clarke

Area
  - Total: 3.80 sq mi (9.85 km^{2})
  - Land: 3.78 sq mi (9.79 km^{2})
  - Water: 0.023 sq mi (0.06 km^{2})
- Elevation: 210 ft (64 m)

Population (2020)
  - Total: 274
  - Density: 72.5/sq mi (27.98/km^{2})
- Time zone: UTC-6 (Central (CST))
  - Summer (DST): UTC-5 (CDT)
- Area codes: 601 & 769
- GNIS feature ID: 669157

De Soto is a census-designated place and unincorporated community in Clarke County, Mississippi, United States.

Pern the 2020 Census, the population was 274.

== History ==
De Soto was named after Hernando de Soto. De Soto was one of four principle towns established in Clarke County before the American Civil War. Established along the Chickasawhay River before the arrival of the Mobile and Ohio Railroad, construction of housing in De Soto may have started as early as 1845 and by 1858 churches were being erected. The town had a Post Office and two churches in 1900 when the population was 258.

In 1855, the Mobile and Ohio Railroad laid track and built a train station at De Soto.

A post office operated under the name De Soto from 1856 to 1978.

At one point, De Soto was home to two sawmills, a drug store, a hotel, a blacksmith, and multiple general stores.

Four sites in De Soto are listed on the National Register of Historic Places: the C. V. Akin House, the Carmichael House, the Cook-Sellers House, and the Covington House.

== Demographics ==
Historical population
Census	Pop.	Note	%±
2020	274		—
U.S. Decennial Census; 2020

De Soto was first listed as a census designated place in the 2020 U.S. census.

=== 2020 census ===
De Soto CDP, Mississippi – Racial and ethnic composition Note: the US Census treats Hispanic/Latino as an ethnic category. This table excludes Latinos from the racial categories and assigns them to a separate category. Hispanics/Latinos may be of any race.
Race / Ethnicity (NH = Non-Hispanic)	Pop 2020	% 2020
White alone (NH)	156	56.93%
Black or African American alone (NH)	108	39.42%
Native American or Alaska Native alone (NH)	0	0.00%
Asian alone (NH)	0	0.00%
Native Hawaiian or Pacific Islander alone (NH)	0	0.00%
Other race alone (NH)	1	0.36%
Mixed race or Multiracial (NH)	5	1.82%
Hispanic or Latino (any race)	4	1.46%
Total	274	100.00%

== Education ==
It is in the Quitman School District.

The county is in the zone for Jones College.
