= Clarke County, Mississippi =

County in Mississippi, United States

- County
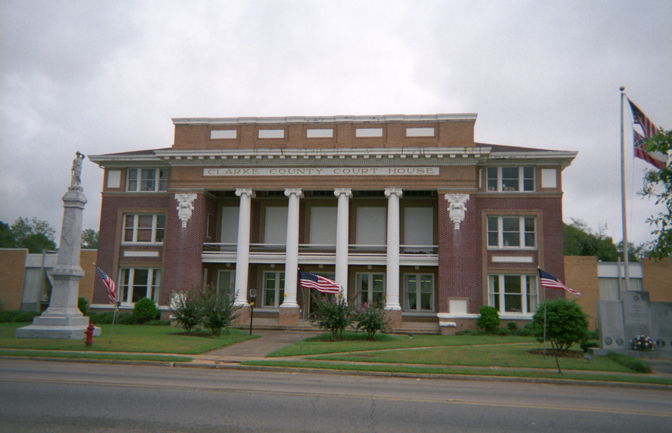
- Clarke County Courthouse and Confederate Monument in Quitman

- Location within the U.S. state of Mississippi
- Coordinates: 32°02′N 88°41′W
- Country: United States
- State: Mississippi
- Founded: December 23, 1833
- Seat: Quitman
- Largest city: Quitman

Area
  - Total: 694 sq mi (1,800 km^{2})
  - Land: 692 sq mi (1,790 km^{2})
  - Water: 2.0 sq mi (5.2 km^{2}) 0.3%

Population (2020)
  - Total: 15,615
  - Estimate (2025): 15,102 ▼
  - Density: 22.6/sq mi (8.71/km^{2})
- Time zone: UTC−6 (Central)
  - Summer (DST): UTC−5 (CDT)
- Congressional district: 3rd
- Website: https://clarkecountyms.gov/

Clarke County is a county located in the U.S. state of Mississippi. As of the 2020 census, the population was 15,615. Its county seat is Quitman. Clarke County is named for Joshua G. Clarke, the first Mississippi state chancellor and judge.

The county is part of the Meridian, MS Micropolitan Statistical Area.

== History ==
Before Europeans first arrived, the Choctaw Indians inhabited the land that would later be known as the Clarke County, Mississippi. Clarke County is only a portion of what was known as Okla Hannali or Six Town District of the Choctaws. Okla Hannali or Six Towns District existed at the time of the Dancing Rabbit Treaty in 1830.

David Gage, who came to the area in about 1820, was a Presbyterian minister. Traveling with him was Moses Jewel and Miss Skinner, who were both teachers. He settled at a place called Eewennans in the Choctaw Nation. David Gage, Moses Jewel, and Miss Skinner came to the territory for the purpose of educating the Indians some domestic habits.

At the beginning of 1832, settlers began to appear in what was known as the “New Purchase”. One of the first families to arrive was Jehu and Sarah Pagaus Evans, who arrived in February 1832, and settled east of Buckatunna Swamp. By the fall of 1832, the “New Purchase” began to fill up quickly with arrivals. Among the early settlers were George Evans, Richard Wagster, Henry Hailes, Alex Hailes, Michael McCarty, James Bankston, Calvin M. Ludlow, John Williford, William Williford, James Risher, J. A. Fontain, John Gunn, Robert Fleming, John Fleming, Hiram Fleming, Norman Martin, Stephen Grice, Thomas F. Hicks, Alex McLendon, Roland B. Crosby, Cameron Grayson, Jesse C. Mott, David Neely, David B. Thompson, Dabney Edwards, Jacob Slack, John Johnston, Alex Trotter, Richard N. Hough, Robert McLaughlin, L. D. Phillips, Samuel Lee, Jesse Sumrall, Jeremiah Crane, Howell Sumrall, William Goleman, Thomas Goleman, Samuel K. Lewis and Thomas Watts.

The county was founded in 1833. Quitman, named for General John A. Quitman.

After the organization of Clarke County, the first school was built close to the old Tennessee Trace. Mr. Hennessy was the teacher and he came from Kinsale, Ireland. Religious services were held in the pioneer families’ home and on days of good weather, outside. The first actual church built was Cedar Creek Church, a Methodist church, and Elim Baptist Church followed in the 1840s.

In the Spring of 1834, Joel Nail, a quadroon Indian, began moving the Choctaw Indians to Muskalresha, an old town in Neshoba County, Mississippi. These journeys continued through 1838 for all that would go. Some of the Choctaw Indians returned to their homes in Clarke County after arriving at Muskalresha.

In the 1830s there were no postal routes in Clarke County. However, there was a stagecoach line from Columbus, Mississippi to Winchester, Wayne County, Mississippi. The settlers of Clarke County would have to travel to Winchester, 25 miles away to receive their mail.

Ten black people were lynched in Clarke County, as documented in The Hanging Bridge by Jason Morgan Ward.

== Geography ==
According to the U.S. Census Bureau, the county has a total area of 694 square miles (1,800 km^{2}), of which 692 square miles (1,790 km^{2}) is land and 2.0 square miles (5.2 km^{2}) (0.3%) is water. The Chickasawhay River flows north to south through the eastern portion of the county; it eventually meets the Pascagoula River.

=== Major highways ===
- Interstate 59
- U.S. Highway 11
- U.S. Highway 45
- Mississippi Highway 18

=== Adjacent counties ===
- Lauderdale County (north)
- Choctaw County, Alabama (east)
- Wayne County (south)
- Jasper County (west)

== Demographics ==
Historical population
Census	Pop.	Note	%±
1840	2,986		—
1850	5,477		83.4%
1860	10,771		96.7%
1870	7,505		−30.3%
1880	15,021		100.1%
1890	15,826		5.4%
1900	17,741		12.1%
1910	21,630		21.9%
1920	17,927		−17.1%
1930	19,679		9.8%
1940	20,596		4.7%
1950	19,362		−6.0%
1960	16,493		−14.8%
1970	15,049		−8.8%
1980	16,945		12.6%
1990	17,313		2.2%
2000	17,955		3.7%
2010	16,732		−6.8%
2020	15,615		−6.7%
2025 (est.)	15,102	▼	−3.3%
U.S. Decennial Census; 1790-1960 1900-1990; 1990-2000 2010-2013

=== Racial and ethnic composition ===
Clarke County, Mississippi – Racial and ethnic composition Note: the US Census treats Hispanic/Latino as an ethnic category. This table excludes Latinos from the racial categories and assigns them to a separate category. Hispanics/Latinos may be of any race.
Race / Ethnicity (NH = Non-Hispanic)	Pop 1980	Pop 1990	Pop 2000	Pop 2010	Pop 2020	% 1980	% 1990	% 2000	% 2010	% 2020
White alone (NH)	10,962	11,271	11,518	10,674	9,950	64.69%	65.10%	64.15%	63.79%	63.72%
Black or African American alone (NH)	5,833	5,963	6,220	5,749	5,103	34.42%	34.44%	34.64%	34.36%	32.68%
Native American or Alaska Native alone (NH)	27	6	17	59	16	0.16%	0.03%	0.09%	0.35%	0.10%
Asian alone (NH)	14	7	19	29	8	0.08%	0.04%	0.11%	0.17%	0.05%
Native Hawaiian or Pacific Islander alone (NH)	x	x	1	1	6	x	x	0.01%	0.01%	0.04%
Other race alone (NH)	2	2	7	6	24	0.01%	0.01%	0.04%	0.04%	0.15%
Mixed race or Multiracial (NH)	x	x	53	82	376	x	x	0.30%	0.49%	2.41%
Hispanic or Latino (any race)	107	64	120	132	132	0.63%	0.37%	0.67%	0.79%	0.85%
Total	16,945	17,313	17,955	16,732	15,615	100.00%	100.00%	100.00%	100.00%	100.00%

=== 2020 census ===
As of the 2020 census, the county had a population of 15,615. The median age was 42.5 years. 23.0% of residents were under the age of 18 and 20.6% of residents were 65 years of age or older. For every 100 females there were 90.5 males, and for every 100 females age 18 and over there were 88.0 males age 18 and over.

The racial makeup of the county was 64.0% White, 32.8% Black or African American, 0.2% American Indian and Alaska Native, 0.1% Asian, <0.1% Native Hawaiian and Pacific Islander, 0.4% from some other race, and 2.6% from two or more races. Hispanic or Latino residents of any race comprised 0.8% of the population.

<0.1% of residents lived in urban areas, while 100.0% lived in rural areas.

There were 6,448 households in the county, of which 30.4% had children under the age of 18 living in them. Of all households, 44.3% were married-couple households, 18.7% were households with a male householder and no spouse or partner present, and 32.6% were households with a female householder and no spouse or partner present. About 29.3% of all households were made up of individuals and 13.5% had someone living alone who was 65 years of age or older.

There were 7,575 housing units, of which 14.9% were vacant. Among occupied housing units, 79.0% were owner-occupied and 21.0% were renter-occupied. The homeowner vacancy rate was 1.3% and the rental vacancy rate was 8.3%.

=== Ancestry/Ethnicity ===
As of 2017 the largest self-identified ancestry groups/ethnic groups in Clarke County, Mississippi were:

Largest ancestries (2017)	Percent
English	22.37%
"American"	10.6%
Irish	7.04%
German	2.65%
Dutch	1.4%
Scots-Irish	1.3%
Scottish	1.1%
French (except Basque)	0.6%

== Communities ==
=== Cities ===
- Quitman (county seat)

=== Towns ===
- Enterprise
- Pachuta
- Shubuta
- Stonewall

=== Census-designated place ===
- De Soto

=== Unincorporated communities ===
- Barnett
- Basic
- Carmichael
- Energy
- Sykes
- Wautubbee

=== Ghost town ===
- Gin

== Politics ==
United States presidential election results for Clarke County, Mississippi
Year	Republican		Democratic		Third party(ies)	
Year	No.	%	No.	%	No.	%
1912	17	2.29%	638	85.87%	88	11.84%
1916	49	4.19%	1,092	93.33%	29	2.48%
1920	47	5.35%	807	91.91%	24	2.73%
1924	87	6.24%	1,306	93.62%	2	0.14%
1928	563	33.23%	1,131	66.77%	0	0.00%
1932	53	3.44%	1,482	96.11%	7	0.45%
1936	31	1.46%	2,089	98.40%	3	0.14%
1940	42	2.40%	1,711	97.60%	0	0.00%
1944	95	5.31%	1,694	94.69%	0	0.00%
1948	17	0.88%	144	7.47%	1,767	91.65%
1952	754	27.38%	2,000	72.62%	0	0.00%
1956	500	20.77%	1,763	73.24%	144	5.98%
1960	586	17.71%	1,244	37.61%	1,478	44.68%
1964	3,591	93.42%	253	6.58%	0	0.00%
1968	298	5.53%	878	16.29%	4,214	78.18%
1972	4,561	81.56%	954	17.06%	77	1.38%
1976	2,935	48.96%	2,816	46.97%	244	4.07%
1980	3,303	49.14%	3,303	49.14%	115	1.71%
1984	4,551	66.61%	2,262	33.11%	19	0.28%
1988	4,522	63.71%	2,576	36.29%	0	0.00%
1992	4,207	60.67%	2,259	32.58%	468	6.75%
1996	3,470	56.04%	2,337	37.74%	385	6.22%
2000	4,503	65.08%	2,368	34.22%	48	0.69%
2004	5,068	67.53%	2,402	32.01%	35	0.47%
2008	5,229	62.27%	3,121	37.17%	47	0.56%
2012	5,049	61.18%	3,111	37.70%	93	1.13%
2016	5,137	65.94%	2,585	33.18%	69	0.89%
2020	5,417	64.97%	2,838	34.04%	83	1.00%
2024	5,093	67.27%	2,430	32.10%	48	0.63%

== Education ==
There are two school districts in the county: Quitman School District and Enterprise School District.

The county is in the zone for Jones College.

== See also ==
- National Register of Historic Places listings in Clarke County, Mississippi
