= Enterprise, Clarke County, Mississippi =

Enterprise, Mississippi
- Town
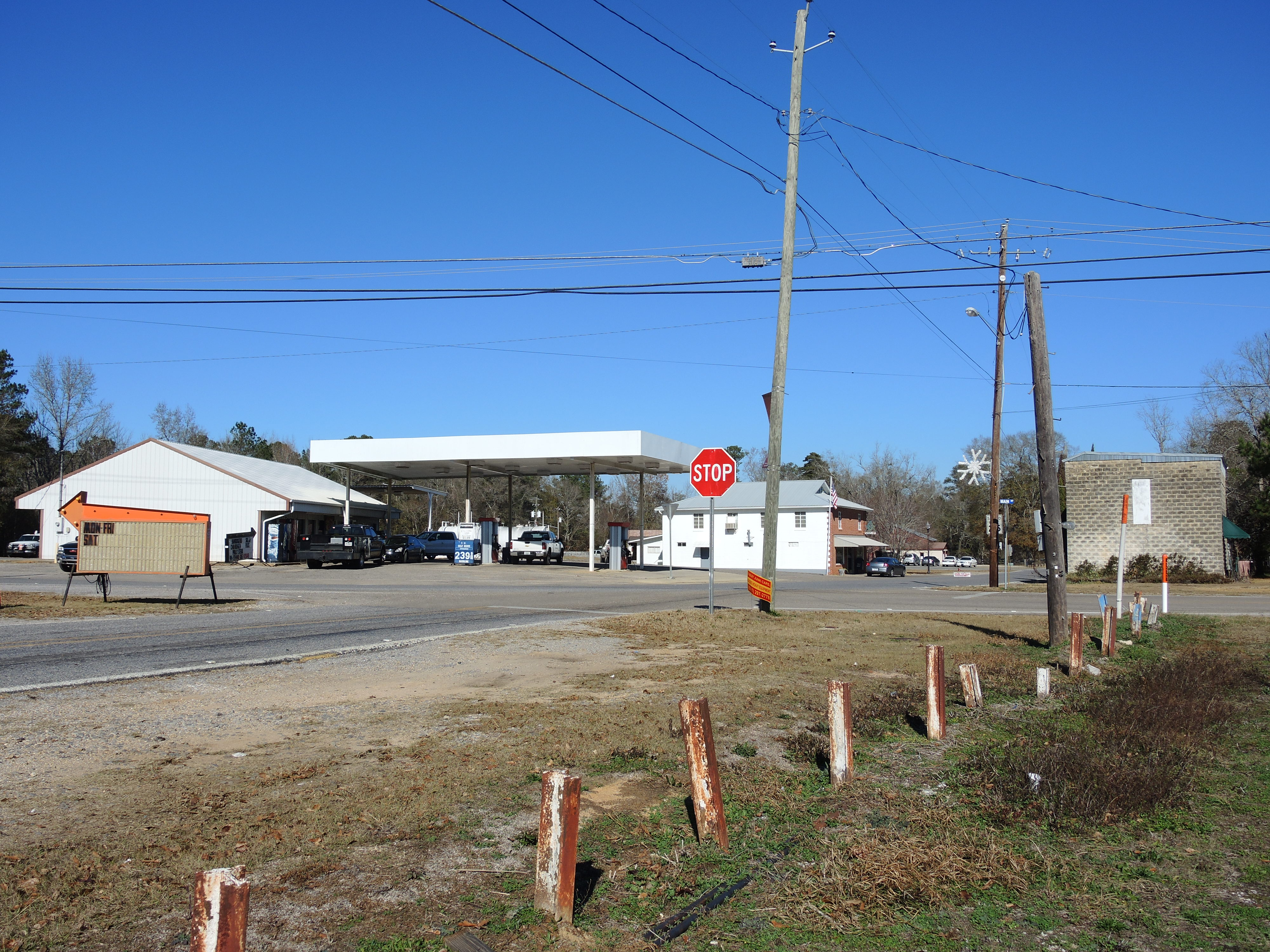
- Mississippi Highway 513 in Enterprise, December 2014

- Location of Enterprise, Mississippi

- Location in the United States
- Coordinates: 32°10′25″N 88°49′19″W
- Country: United States
- State: Mississippi
- County: Clarke

Area
  - Total: 2.46 sq mi (6.37 km^{2})
  - Land: 2.45 sq mi (6.35 km^{2})
  - Water: 0.0077 sq mi (0.02 km^{2})
- Elevation: 259 ft (79 m)

Population (2020)
  - Total: 496
  - Density: 202/sq mi (78.1/km^{2})
- Time zone: UTC-6 (Central (CST))
  - Summer (DST): UTC-5 (CDT)
- ZIP code: 39330
- Area code: 601
- FIPS code: 28-22580
- GNIS feature ID: 0669792
- Website: www.townofenterprise.com

Enterprise is a town in Clarke County, Mississippi, United States. The population was 526 at the 2010 census.

== History ==
Enterprise was so named "to denote the policy of their inhabitants". The town was founded in 1834, by John J. McRae, who later served as Governor of Mississippi.

In 1855, the Mobile and Ohio Railroad laid track and built a train station at Enterprise.

In the early days of the American Civil War, a military training camp was set up at Enterprise for newly created Confederate units. After the fall of Vicksburg and Port Hudson in July, 1863, thousands of paroled Confederate troops were sent to a camp at Enterprise to await exchange.

Units from Enterprise that served in the Civil War include the "Enterprise Guards", Company B of the 14th Mississippi Infantry Regiment, the "Enterprise Tigers", Company D of the 37th Mississippi Infantry, the "East Mississippi Guards", Company F of the 2nd Mississippi Cavalry Regiment, and the "McLain Rifles", Company B of the 37th Mississippi Infantry.

After the state capital of Jackson fell to Union forces in May, 1863, the state government was briefly moved to Enterprise. The capital was moved to Columbus a few months later.

The town formerly was located on the Mobile and Ohio Railroad and the New Orleans and Northeastern Railroad.

== Geography ==
Enterprise is located in northwestern Clarke County at 32°10′25″N 88°49′19″W (32.173620, -88.821935). The Chickasawhay River is formed at Enterprise by the confluence of the Chunky River and Okatibbee Creek.

U.S. Route 11 passes through the west side of the town, leading north 17 miles (27 km) to Meridian and south 39 miles (63 km) to Laurel. Exit 134 on Interstate 59 is 2 miles (3 km) west of town.

According to the United States Census Bureau, the town has a total area of 2.4 square miles (6.3 km^{2}), of which 0.0077 square miles (0.02 km^{2}), or 0.27%, is water.

== Demographics ==
Historical population
Census	Pop.	Note	%±
1900	789		—
1910	877		11.2%
1920	700		−20.2%
1930	792		13.1%
1940	757		−4.4%
1950	691		−8.7%
1960	532		−23.0%
1970	458		−13.9%
1980	607		32.5%
1990	477		−21.4%
2000	474		−0.6%
2010	526		11.0%
2020	496		−5.7%
U.S. Decennial Census

=== 2020 census ===
Enterprise racial composition (NH = Non-Hispanic) (Note: Note: the US Census treats Hispanic/Latino as an ethnic category. This table excludes Latinos from the racial categories and assigns them to a separate category. Hispanics/Latinos can be of any race.)
Race	Number	Percentage
White (NH)	412	83.06%
Black or African American (NH)	63	12.7%
Some Other Race (NH)	2	0.4%
Mixed/Multi-Racial (NH)	10	2.02%
Hispanic or Latino	9	1.81%
Total	496	

As of the 2020 United States census, there were 496 people, 202 households, and 137 families residing in the town.

=== 2000 census ===
As of the census of 2000, there were 465 people, 202 households, and 138 families residing in the town. The population density was 209.0 inhabitants per square mile (80.7/km^{2}). There were 241 housing units at an average density of 106.3 per square mile (41.0/km^{2}). The racial makeup of the town was 75.74% White, 23.84% African American, 0.21% Asian, and 0.21% from two or more races. Hispanic or Latino of any race were 0.21% of the population.

There were 202 households, out of which 29.7% had children under the age of 18 living with them, 53.0% were married couples living together, 12.9% had a female householder with no husband present, and 31.2% were non-families. 28.2% of all households were made up of individuals, and 13.9% had someone living alone who was 65 years of age or older. The average household size was 2.35 and the average family size was 2.83.

In the town, the population was spread out, with 23.6% under the age of 18, 7.4% from 18 to 24, 26.8% from 25 to 44, 24.7% from 45 to 64, and 17.5% who were 65 years of age or older. The median age was 39 years. For every 100 females, there were 97.5 males. For every 100 females age 18 and over, there were 92.6 males.

The median income for a household in the town was $33,125, and the median income for a family was $37,375. Males had a median income of $29,583 versus $21,719 for females. The per capita income for the town was $16,995. About 9.2% of families and 13.5% of the population were below the poverty line, including 14.5% of those under age 18 and 23.5% of those age 65 or over.

== Education ==
The town of Enterprise is served by the Enterprise School District. Enterprise High School is one of two high schools in Clarke County.

The county is in the zone for Jones College.

== Notable people ==
- Chester Harding, governor of the Panama Canal Zone from 1917 to 1921
- Billy Mitts, member of the Mississippi State Senate from 1960 to 1964
- Joe Williams, former head college basketball coach for Jacksonville University, Furman University, and Florida State University

== See also ==
- List of municipalities in Mississippi
