= Quitman, Mississippi =

- City
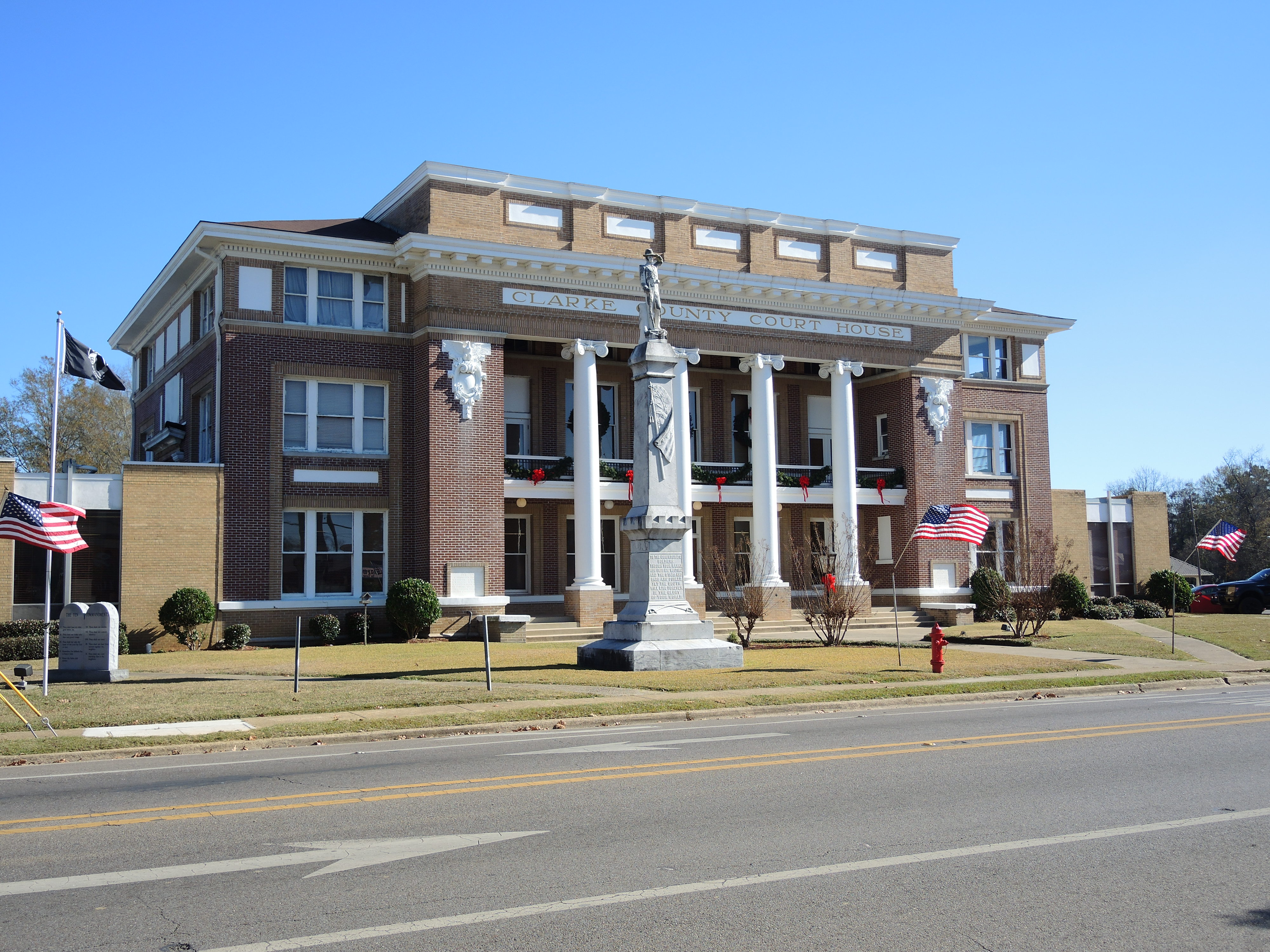
- Clarke County Courthouse and Confederate monument in Quitman

- Flag Seal
- Motto: "A Very Special Place To Call Home"
- Location of Quitman, Mississippi

- Location in the United States
- Coordinates: 32°2′35″N 88°43′15″W
- Country: United States
- State: Mississippi
- County: Clarke
- Established: 1839

Area
  - Total: 5.90 sq mi (15.29 km^{2})
  - Land: 5.18 sq mi (13.41 km^{2})
  - Water: 0.73 sq mi (1.88 km^{2})
- Elevation: 230 ft (70 m)

Population (2020)
  - Total: 2,061
  - Density: 398.1/sq mi (153.71/km^{2})
- Time zone: UTC-6 (Central (CST))
  - Summer (DST): UTC-5 (CDT)
- ZIP code: 39355
- Area code: 601
- FIPS code: 28-60720
- GNIS feature ID: 0676438
- Website: www.cityquitman.net

Quitman is a city in and the county seat of Clarke County, Mississippi, United States, along the Chickasawhay River. As of the 2020 census, Quitman had a population of 2,061.

== History ==
Quitman was established in 1839 and named as the county seat.

In 1855, the Mobile and Ohio Railroad laid track and built a station on the east bank of the Chickasawhay River, prompting development of the city on the east bank.

During the Civil War, a hospital built with funds raised in Galveston and Houston, among other places, was built there for the care of Confederate soldiers from Texas. Originally staffed by Louis Bryan with supplies purchased in Mexico, he was joined, and later supplanted, by Enos Bonney, a surgeon from Enterprise, Mississippi, who stayed until the hospital was burned down. Though it cared for troops from any state, the hospital was colloquially known as "The Texas Hospital." Wounded soldiers from the Second Battle of Corinth, Battle of Iuka, Battle of Jackson, Tennessee, and more local engagements, as well as those suffering from wartime diseases, were treated at the hospital. A cemetery was established adjacent to the hospital for those who succumbed to disease or wounds.

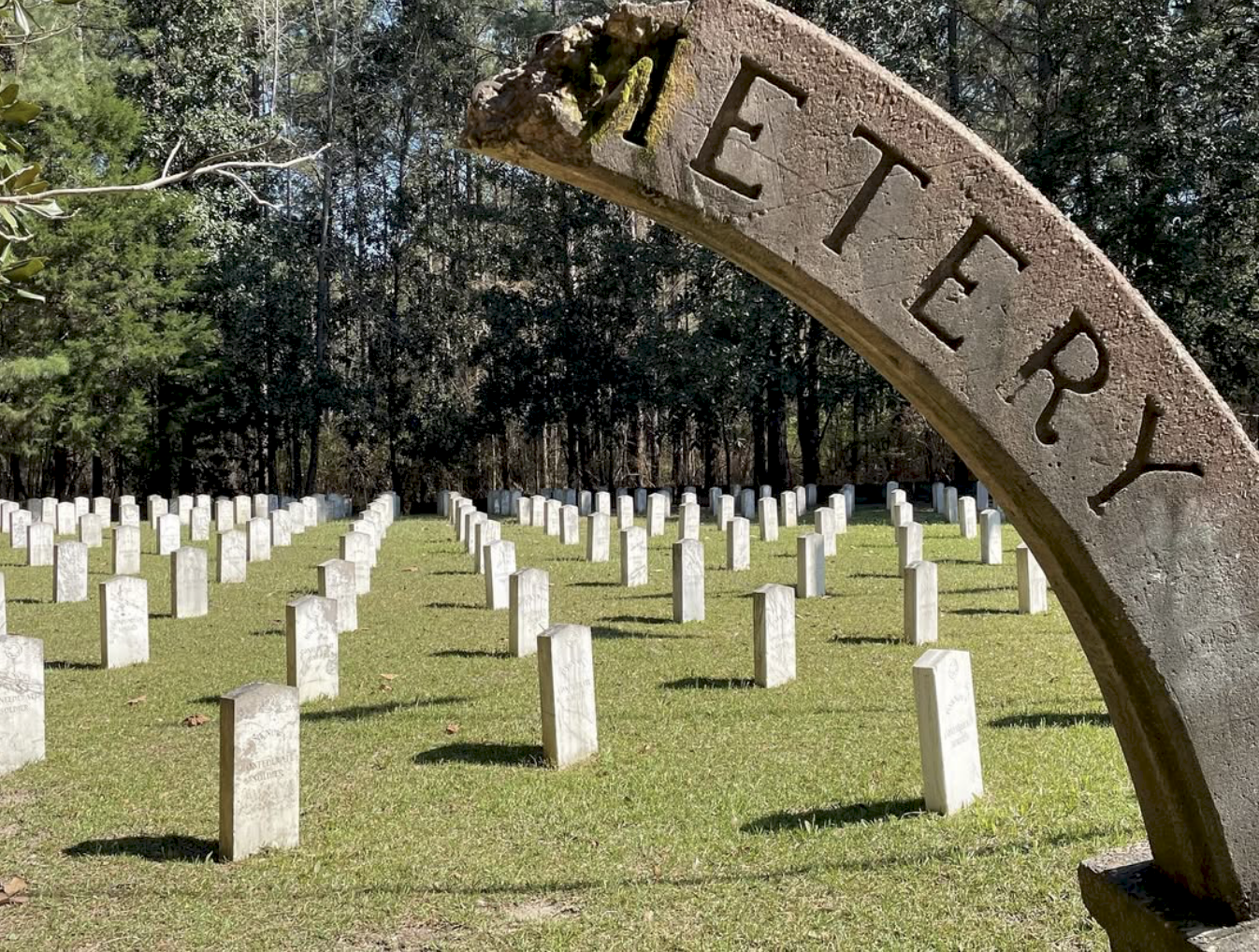
The Confederate Cemetery as of 2022

During General Sherman's Meridian Campaign, Brigadier General Walter Q. Gresham, Commander of the Third Brigade, Fourth Division, 17th Army Corps, was detached and sent to Quitman to destroy bridges crossing the Chickasawhay river and through Alligator Swamp, as well as any other infrastructure that could be of any use to the Confederacy. The force arrived at Quitman and proceeded to burn the town jail, courthouse, various stores, the railroad depot, and the Methodist Church, which was being used as a hospital. Troops then burned down the entire Texas Hospital complex, which included two main buildings as well as twelve to fifteen barracks. The hospital was never rebuilt.

Quitman was officially recognized by the Mississippi Legislature on February 13, 1839, and was named for the second Chancellor of the State, Gen. John A. Quitman, a strongly pro-slavery politician, leading Fire Eater, veteran of the Mexican–American War.

== Geography ==
Quitman is located near the center of Clarke County. Mississippi Highway 18 passes through the center of the city.

According to the United States Census Bureau, the city has a total area of 5.9 square miles (15.3 km^{2}), of which 5.2 square miles (13.4 km^{2}) is land and 0.73 square miles (1.9 km^{2}), or 12.28%, is water.

=== Climate ===
Climate data for Quitman
Month	Jan	Feb	Mar	Apr	May	Jun	Jul	Aug	Sep	Oct	Nov	Dec	Year
Mean daily maximum °F (°C)	56.6 (13.7)	62.0 (16.7)	69.2 (20.7)	77.5 (25.3)	83.9 (28.8)	89.7 (32.1)	91.9 (33.3)	91.5 (33.1)	87.0 (30.6)	77.8 (25.4)	68.6 (20.3)	60.0 (15.6)	76.3 (24.6)
Mean daily minimum °F (°C)	32.9 (0.5)	36.1 (2.3)	42.6 (5.9)	50.3 (10.2)	58.2 (14.6)	65.1 (18.4)	68.5 (20.3)	67.6 (19.8)	62.3 (16.8)	49.2 (9.6)	41.6 (5.3)	35.4 (1.9)	50.8 (10.4)
Average precipitation inches (mm)	5.5 (140)	4.9 (120)	6.1 (150)	5.3 (130)	4.0 (100)	4.0 (100)	5.1 (130)	3.5 (89)	3.8 (97)	3.2 (81)	4.0 (100)	5.3 (130)	54.8 (1,390)
Source: Weatherbase

== Demographics ==
Historical population
Census	Pop.	Note	%±
1880	410		—
1890	395		−3.7%
1900	498		26.1%
1910	950		90.8%
1920	1,375		44.7%
1930	1,872		36.1%
1940	1,471		−21.4%
1950	1,817		23.5%
1960	2,030		11.7%
1970	2,702		33.1%
1980	2,632		−2.6%
1990	2,736		4.0%
2000	2,463		−10.0%
2010	2,323		−5.7%
2020	2,061		−11.3%
U.S. Decennial Census

=== 2020 census ===
As of the 2020 census, Quitman had a population of 2,061. The median age was 46.7 years. 21.8% of residents were under the age of 18 and 26.2% of residents were 65 years of age or older. For every 100 females there were 80.8 males, and for every 100 females age 18 and over there were 77.0 males age 18 and over.

0.0% of residents lived in urban areas, while 100.0% lived in rural areas.

There were 891 households in Quitman, of which 28.5% had children under the age of 18 living in them. Of all households, 35.5% were married-couple households, 18.2% were households with a male householder and no spouse or partner present, and 41.9% were households with a female householder and no spouse or partner present. About 33.8% of all households were made up of individuals and 16.4% had someone living alone who was 65 years of age or older. There were 619 families residing in the city.

There were 1,037 housing units, of which 14.1% were vacant. The homeowner vacancy rate was 1.7% and the rental vacancy rate was 9.8%.

Racial composition as of the 2020 census
Race	Number	Percent
White	1,189	57.7%
Black or African American	760	36.9%
American Indian and Alaska Native	10	0.5%
Asian	4	0.2%
Native Hawaiian and Other Pacific Islander	0	0.0%
Some other race	14	0.7%
Two or more races	84	4.1%
Hispanic or Latino (of any race)	28	1.4%

== Education ==
The city is served by the Quitman School District.

The county is in the zone for Jones College.

== Notable people ==
- Andy Blakeney, jazz trumpeter
- Wyatt Emory Cooper, writer
- Oscar W. Gillespie, U.S. Representative for the state of Texas
- Dustin J. Lee, Corporal in the United States Marine Corps who was killed in Fallujah, Iraq
- Sam C. Massingale, American politician and a U.S. Representative from Oklahoma
- Kelly McCarty, former NBA player
- Antonio McDyess, former NBA power forward
- Tarvarius Moore, NFL defensive back
- Aubrey Rozzell, former National Football League linebacker
- Homer Smith, Jr, journalist
- Samuel H. Terral, Justice of the Mississippi Supreme Court from 1897 to 1903
- James Yates (activist), labor organizer, political activist, and veteran of the Spanish Civil War

== See also ==
- Quitman Depot
