= Kalem (disambiguation) =

Kalem Company was a former film studio in the United States.

Kalem may also refer to:

- Kalem (magazine), a satirical magazine published in the period 1908–1911 in Istanbul, Ottoman Empire
- Kalem (surname)
- Kalem Island, an Aegean island of Turkey
- Kalem, Mississippi
- Kalem Club, an informal New York City literary and intellectual group associated with H.P. Lovecraft
- Kalem railway station, a small railway station in Goa, India
