= List of Mississippi state parks =

Map of Mississippi state parks.

This is a list of Mississippi state parks. As of 2024, the state park system of the U.S. state of Mississippi comprises 24 state parks and one natural area.

== Current state parks ==
Name	County	Locality	Estab- lished	River / lake / other	Image	Remarks
Buccaneer State Park	Hancock	Waveland	2005 (rebuilt)	Gulf of Mexico		Waterpark, camping
Clark Creek Natural Area	Wilkinson	Woodville	1978	Clark Creek		Fifty waterfalls. 700 acres (280 ha)
Clarkco State Park	Clarke	Quitman	1930s	Moore Mill Creek		Boating, fishing, camping. 815 acres (330 ha)
Florewood State Park	Leflore	Greenwood	1973	Yalobusha River		Leased by Leflore County; "temporarily closed" since auction of artifacts and buildings in 2005
George P. Cossar State Park	Yalobusha	Oakland	1966	Enid Lake		Boating, fishing, camping
Golden Memorial State Park	Leake	Walnut Grove		Golden Memorial Park Lake		Fishing, camping
Great River Road State Park	Bolivar	Rosedale		Perry Martin Lake		Mississippi River lookout tower
Holmes County State Park	Holmes	Durant	1930s	Odum Lake and English Lake		Swimming, fishing, camping
Hugh White State Park	Grenada	Grenada		Grenada Lake		Boating, fishing, camping
John W. Kyle State Park	Panola	Sardis		Sardis Reservoir		Boating, fishing, camping, golf course
J. P. Coleman State Park	Tishomingo	Iuka		Pickwick Lake		Boating, camping, swimming pool
Lake Lincoln State Park	Lincoln	Wesson		Lake Lincoln		Boating, fishing, camping
Lake Lowndes State Park	Lowndes	Columbus		Lake Lowndes		Boating, fishing, camping, equestrian trails, gymnasium
LeFleur's Bluff State Park	Hinds	Jackson		Pearl River, Mayes Lake		Hiking, boating, fishing; golf course, Mississippi Museum of Natural Science. 305 acres (123 ha)
Legion State Park	Winston	Louisville	1930s	Legion Lake		Fishing, camping
Leroy Percy State Park	Washington	Hollandale	1930s	Gamble Lake and Brushy Lake		Alligator watching, boating, fishing, camping
Natchez State Park	Adams	Natchez		Natchez Lake		Boating, fishing, camping, horseback riding
Paul B. Johnson State Park	Forrest	Hattiesburg		Geiger Lake		Boating, fishing, camping
Percy Quin State Park	Pike	McComb	1930s	Lake Tangipahoa		Boating, fishing, camping; convention center
Roosevelt State Park	Scott	Morton	1930s	Shadow Lake		Boating, fishing, camping
Shepard State Park	Jackson	Gautier		Singing River		Small-craft boat ramp, camping, trails. 395 acres (160 ha)
Tishomingo State Park	Tishomingo	Tishomingo	1930s	Haynes Lake, Bear Creek		Canoeing, fishing, camping, swimming pool
Tombigbee State Park	Lee	Tupelo	1930s	Lake Lee		Fishing, camping
Trace State Park	Pontotoc	Pontotoc		Trace Lake		Off-road vehicle trails, golf course, boating, camping
Wall Doxey State Park	Marshall	Holly Springs	1930s	Spring Lake		Fishing, camping

== Defunct state parks or under other jurisdiction ==
- Arkbutla State Park
- Casey Jones State Park
- Fort Maurepas State Park
- Grand Gulf Military Monument Park, Port Gibson
- Gulf Marine State Park
- Nanih Waiya State Park, transferred to the Mississippi Band of Choctaw 2006
- Sam Dale State Park
- Winterville Mounds, 1960–2000, transferred to Department of Archives and History

== See also ==
- List of U.S. state parks
- List of U.S. national parks
