= Homewood, Mississippi =

- Unincorporated community
- Location within Mississippi Location within the United States
- Coordinates: 32°14′25″N 89°30′22″W
- Country: United States
- State: Mississippi
- County: Scott
- Elevation: 476 ft (145 m)
- Time zone: UTC-6 (Central (CST))
  - Summer (DST): UTC-5 (CDT)
- ZIP code: 39074
- Area code: 601
- GNIS feature ID: 693515

Homewood is an unincorporated community located in Scott County, Mississippi. Homewood is located along Mississippi Highway 35, approximately 9.2 miles (14.8 km) south of Forest and 6.5 miles (10.5 km) east-southeast of Pulaski.

== History ==
Homewood was founded on July 14, 1849 and was originally known as Bucksnort.

In 1900 Homewood had a population of 73 and was home to a school, two grist mills, two churches, two cotton gins, and four stores.

A post office operated under the name Homewood from 1850 to 1974.
