= LeFleur's Bluff State Park =

State park in Mississippi, United States

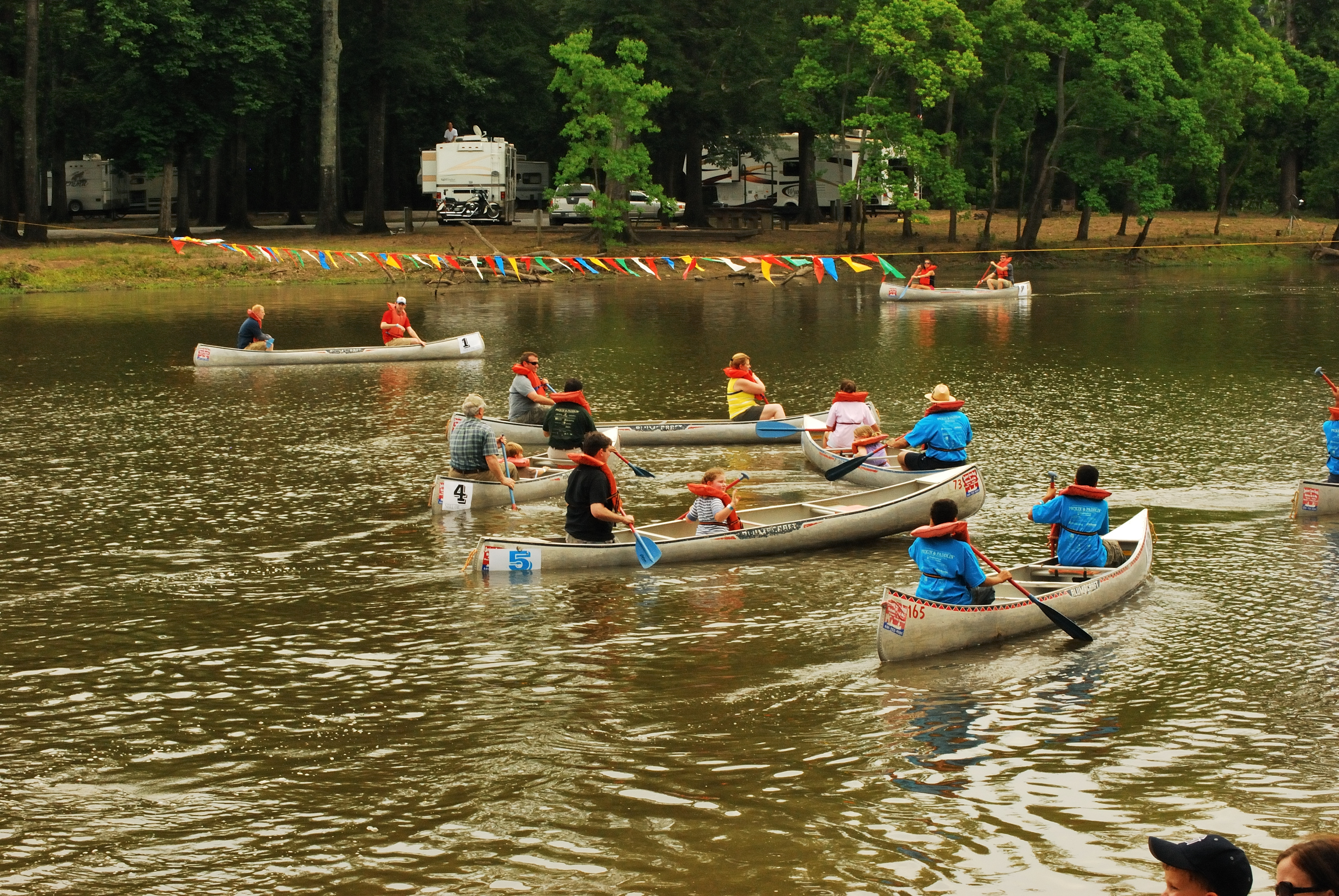

- Location within Mississippi
- Location: Jackson, Mississippi, United States
- Coordinates: 32°19′47″N 90°08′54″W
- Area: 305 acres (123 ha)
- Elevation: 279 ft (85 m)
- Administrator: Mississippi Department of Wildlife, Fisheries, and Parks
- Designation: Mississippi state park
- Website: Official website

LeFleur's Bluff State Park is a public recreation area located on the banks of the Pearl River off Interstate 55 within the city limits of Jackson, Mississippi. The state park is home to a 50-acre (20 ha) lake, the Mississippi Museum of Natural Science, and the Mississippi Children's Museum.

== History ==
The park is named for the trading post established on the banks of the Pearl River in the late 18th century by Louis LeFleur, a French Canadian trader. The village of LeFleur's Bluff eventually grew to become the city of Jackson.

The area which is now LeFleur's Bluff State Park was once part of the Choctaw Nation. Under pressure from the United States government, the Choctaw Native Americans agreed to removal from their lands east of the Mississippi River, under the terms of the Treaty of Dancing Rabbit Creek in 1830. Although many Choctaws then moved to present-day Oklahoma, a significant number chose to stay in Mississippi.

In 1821, the Mississippi Legislature, meeting in the then-capital of Natchez, sent Thomas Hinds, James Patton, and William Lattimore to look for a location on which to establish a more centrally located state capital. After surveying areas north and east of what is now Jackson, they proceeded southwest along the Pearl River until they reached LeFleur's Bluff in today's Hinds County. Their report to the General Assembly stated that this location had beautiful and healthful surroundings, good water, abundant timber, navigable waters, and proximity to the Natchez Trace trading route. On November 28, 1821, the state assembly authorized the location to become the permanent seat of the government of the state of Mississippi.

== Museums ==
The Mississippi Museum of Natural Science features aquariums, habitat exhibits, and nature trails featuring the flora and fauna of Mississippi. The museum houses the state's systematic collections, containing more than a million specimens of fish, reptiles, amphibians, birds, mammals, invertebrates, plants, and fossils. Twenty-one outdoor nature exhibits managed by the museum are within the park. The native plant garden features swamp azalea, smooth phlox, mountain laurel, bell flower, sweet shrubs and spiderwort. The prairie garden plot uses minimal amounts of pesticides and fertilizers to recreate a patch of prairie featuring prairie and purple coneflower, goldenrod, gayfeather, thimbleweed and New England aster. A woodland pond is a reminder of the days when the park was a farm. It provides a habitat for frogs and other amphibians. The upland ridge section of the park is a wooded area that hosts a disc golf course. It is a habitat for a mixture of woodland trees and was formerly farmland. Fifty to sixty million years ago what is now LeFleur's Bluff State Park was covered by an inland sea. Fossils from this era can be found on the parks bluffs.

In 2010, the Mississippi Children's Museum was completed within the state park.

== Activities and amenities ==
In addition to hiking, LeFleur's Bluff State Park offers boating and fishing on the Pearl River and Mayes Lake. Common game fish include catfish, bass, bream, and crappie. A nine-hole disc golf course is located on the shores of Mayes Lake. There are 28 campsites open to tent or RV camping and 10 tent camping sites.

Trails

Since the park is surrounded by the city of Jackson, the hiking trails are all under 0.5 miles (0.80 km):

Trail Name	Color	Length	Remarks
Pearl River Trail	Purple	0.49 miles (0.79 km)	Longest trail in the park; passes by the store at Mayes Lake which is the only stop on the trail system with restrooms.
Cypress Swamp Trail	Blue	0.36 miles (0.58 km)	Steep in parts with some boardwalk steps and platforms; connects the red and green trails.
Old River Run	Red	0.32 miles (0.51 km)	"Alive with paw paws."
Overlook Loop	Green	0.21 miles (0.34 km)	Provides views from the bluff.
Old Pond Trail	Yellow	0.16 miles (0.26 km)	The shortest trail in the park; has some boardwalk decking.

Golf

The park's nine-hole golf course closed in 2019; no date has been established for its reopening. In 2022, Governor Tate Reeves vetoed a bill that would have provided $11 million to refurbish the course.
