= Constance Slaughter-Harvey =

American lawyer and judge

Constance Iona Slaughter-Harvey (born 1946) is an American jurist who in 1976 became the first black female judge in the state of Mississippi.

== Education ==
Slaughter-Harvey was born in Forest, Mississippi, and studied at Hawkins High School where she graduated valedictorian in 1963. She received her bachelor's degree in political science and economics from Tougaloo College with cum laude honors. She met civil rights activist Medgar Evers while she was in college and his assassination in 1963 influenced Slaughter-Harvey to pursue a Juris Doctor degree. After graduation, she enrolled at the University of Mississippi School of Law where she was the first African-American female to graduate in 1970.

== Career ==
At the age of 24, Slaughter-Harvey was instrumental in integrating the ranks of the Mississippi Highway Patrol, which led to the integration of highway patrols across the nation.

After graduating from law school in 1970, Slaughter-Harvey sued the state of Mississippi for racial discrimination. In response, Mississippi added the first three black state troopers to their ranks: Walter Crosby, Lewis Younger and R. O. Williams. Slaughter-Harvey noted that the Mississippi Highway Patrol was the strong arm of the law for the Ku Klux Klan. She used her law degree to push to get that changed.

Slaughter-Harvey was picked to serve as Scott County Court Judge in 1976 in a case involving a party previously represented by Judge Guyton Idom. This appointment made her the first female black judge in the state of Mississippi. She also served as a member of the Governor's Minority Advisory Committee and a Presidential Scholars Commissioner during the administration of President Jimmy Carter.

== Personal life ==
Slaughter-Harvey is Catholic.

== See also ==
- List of first women lawyers and judges in Mississippi
