= FDR State Park =

FDR State Park may refer to:

- F.D. Roosevelt State Park in Pine Mountain, Georgia
- Franklin D. Roosevelt State Park in Yorktown, New York
- Franklin D. Roosevelt Four Freedoms Park in New York City

== See also ==
- Roosevelt State Park in Mississippi
