= Greene Fort Pinkston =

American physician

Greene Fort Pinkston (born 1875 in Forest, Mississippi; died 1963) was an African-American medical doctor and landowner in Cordova, Tennessee.

== Biography ==
Pinkston was born in Scott County, Mississippi in 1875 and graduated from high school in Meridian, Mississippi. After high school he worked as a school teacher. At the age of 24 his fiancé died of tuberculosis, inspiring him to become a medical doctor. He began medical school at 24 and graduated from Meharry Medical College in 1904. He then moved to Memphis, Tennessee to practice medicine. In 1908 he and his partner, Andrew D. Byas, started the North Memphis Drug Company, one of the first African-American owned pharmaceutical companies. In 1915 he and his wife, Penella Home Pinkston, purchased 258 acres of land in nearby Cordova, Tennessee and he continued to practice in Cordova, Memphis, and surrounding rural communities. In 1963, he was forced to sell a large part of his land to the Tennessee Valley Authority. He had nine children. One son, Charles, became a prominent dentist in Orange Mound, Memphis, Tennessee.
