= Taveze Calhoun =

American football player (born 1992)

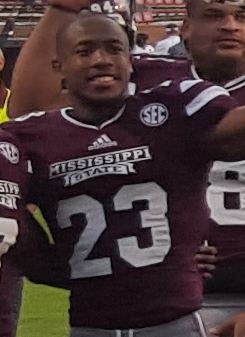
- Calhoun with Mississippi State in 2015

No. 39
- Position: Cornerback

Personal information
- Born: December 26, 1992 (age 33); Morton, Mississippi, U.S.
- Listed height: 6 ft 1 in (1.85 m)
- Listed weight: 188 lb (85 kg)

Career information
- High school: Morton
- College: Mississippi State
- NFL draft: 2016: undrafted

Career history
- Chicago Bears (2016)*; New Orleans Saints (2016); Miami Dolphins (2017–2018)*; Atlanta Falcons (2018–2019)
- * Offseason or practice squad member only

Awards and highlights
- 2013 Liberty Bowl champion; 2015 Belk Bowl champion; SEC 1st in interception return yards (101) (2013)
- Stats at Pro Football Reference

Taveze Calhoun (born December 26, 1992) is an American former professional football player who was a cornerback in the National Football League (NFL). He played college football for the Mississippi State Bulldogs.

== College career ==
Calhoun red-shirted in 2011 after having shoulder surgery in August. He started 36 games in his collegiate career. Calhoun tallied 161 career tackles, 12 tackles for loss and six interceptions for 98 yards. Calhoun forced three fumbles and tallied one fumble recovery.

Calhoun totaled 24 tackles, 0.5 tackles for loss and a forced fumble in 2012. He forced his first fumble and made three tackles in the home win against South Alabama.

In 2013, he ranked 1st in the SEC in interception return yards with 101 yards. Calhoun caught 3 interceptions on the year and recorded 45 total tackles (33 solo). Calhoun earned his first career start against Oklahoma State. Scooped up a blocked field goal and returned it 68 yards to the OSU 10-yard line to end the first half. He intercepted first two passes of career against Alabama.

He ranked 5th on the team in tackles with 50 in 2014. Ranked 7th in the SEC in pass breakups with 9. He recorded a season-high 7 tackles against No. 6 Texas A&M.

Calhoun finished the 2015 season with 39 tackles, 6.5 for loss, two interceptions and a team-best 10 passes defended. He tied a career high with two interceptions against Kentucky.

== Professional career ==
=== Chicago Bears ===
On May 9, 2016, after going undrafted in the 2016 NFL draft, Calhoun signed with the Chicago Bears. On September 3, 2016, he was released by the Bears as part of final roster cuts.

=== New Orleans Saints ===
On September 14, 2016, Calhoun was signed to the Saints' practice squad. He was promoted to the active roster on December 31, 2016.

On September 2, 2017, Calhoun was waived by the Saints.

=== Miami Dolphins ===
On December 20, 2017, Calhoun was signed to the Miami Dolphins practice squad. He signed a reserve/future contract with the Dolphins on January 1, 2018. He was waived on September 1, 2018.

=== Atlanta Falcons ===
On September 18, 2018, Calhoun was signed to the Atlanta Falcons' practice squad. He was released on October 4, 2018. He was re-signed on October 31, 2018. He signed a reserve/future contract with the Falcons on December 31, 2018.

On August 31, 2019, Calhoun was waived/injured by the Falcons and placed on injured reserve. He was released on December 20, 2019.
