= Lake Lowndes State Park =

State park in Mississippi, United States

- Location within Mississippi
- Location: Lowndes County, Mississippi, United States
- Coordinates: 33°26′05″N 88°18′10″W
- Elevation: 240 ft (73 m)
- Administrator: Mississippi Department of Wildlife, Fisheries, and Parks
- Designation: Mississippi state park
- Website: Official website

Lake Lowndes State Park is a public recreation area in the U.S. state of Mississippi located off Mississippi Highway 69, eight miles (13 km) southeast of Columbus, Mississippi.

== Activities and amenities ==
The state park features boating, waterskiing and fishing on 150-acre (61 ha) Lowndes Lake, primitive and developed campsites, cabins and cottages, seven miles (11 km) of hiking and equestrian trails, visitors center with gymnasium, tennis courts and play fields, picnic area, and an 18-hole disc golf course, Whispering Pines.
