= Senator Heflin =

Senator Heflin may refer to:

== Members of the United States Senate ==
- Howell Heflin (1921–2005), U.S. Senator from Alabama from 1979 to 1997
- James Thomas Heflin (1869–1951), U.S. Senator from Alabama from 1920 to 1931

== United States state senate members ==
- Alan Heflin (1939–2015), Mississippi State Senate
- Robert Stell Heflin (1815–1901), Georgia State Senate and Alabama State Senate
