= Clark Creek Natural Area =

State park in Mississippi, United States

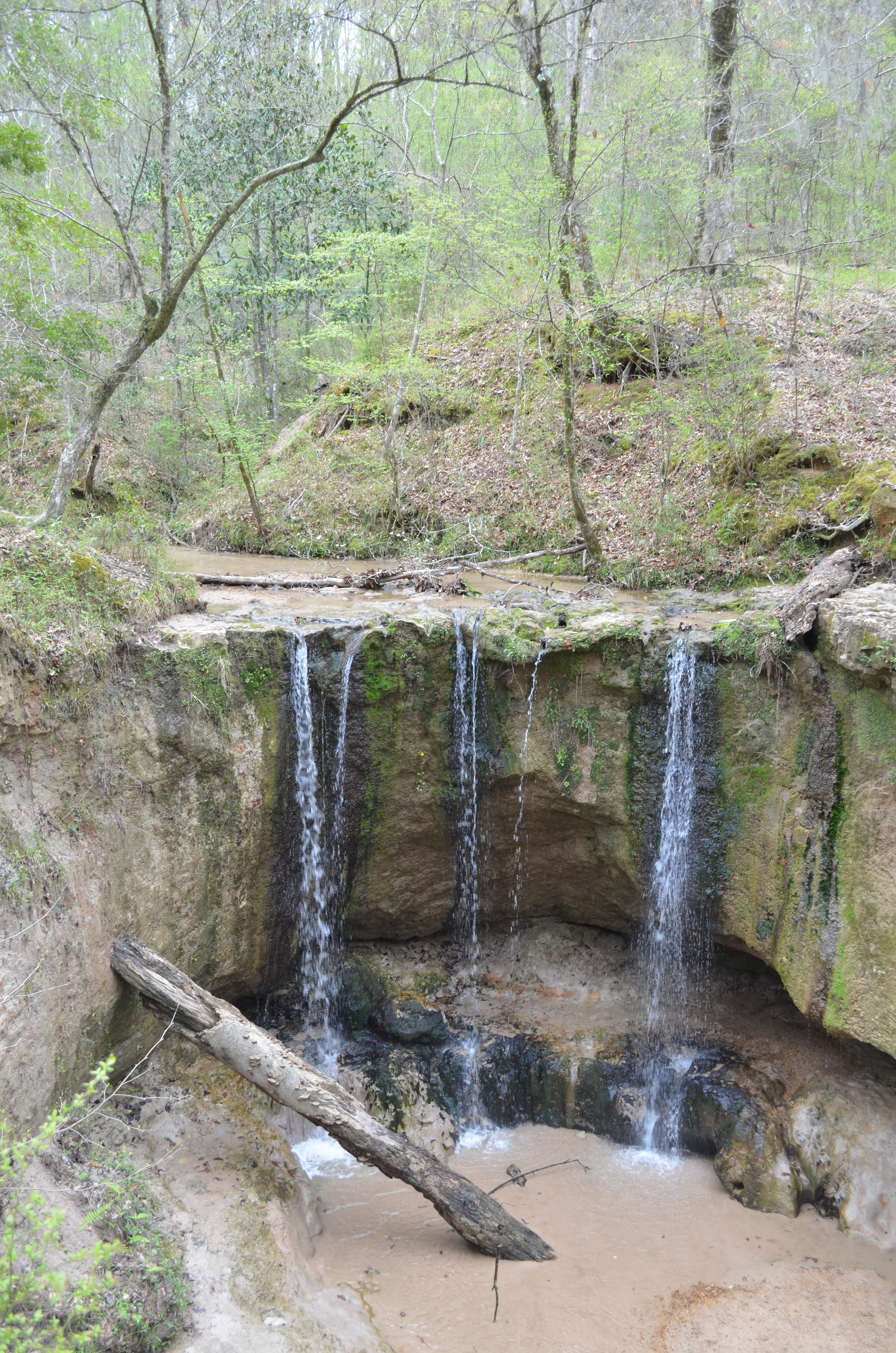

- Location within Mississippi
- Location: Wilkinson County, Mississippi, United States
- Coordinates: 31°04′8.6″N 91°30′59″W
- Area: 700 acres (280 ha)
- Elevation: 200–400 ft (61–122 m)
- Established: 1978
- Administrator: Mississippi Department of Wildlife, Fisheries, and Parks
- Designation: Mississippi state park
- Website: Clark Creek Natural Area

Clark Creek Natural Area is a publicly owned, natural preservation area encompassing 700 acres (280 ha) off Mississippi Highway 24 approximately 13 miles (21 km) west of Woodville, Mississippi. The state park features approximately 50 waterfalls, some with up to 30-foot (9.1 m) drops. The park is used for hiking, bird watching, and geocaching.

== History ==
The park was established in 1978 through the efforts of the Mississippi Wildlife Heritage Committee, the Nature Conservancy, Wilkinson County, David Bramlette, International Paper Company and the Mississippi Department of Wildlife, Fisheries and Parks.

== Geomorphology ==
The Clark Creek Natural Area lies within a portion of the Bluff Hills known as the Tunica Hills. The Bluff Hills are a 10–25 mi (16–40 km) wide belt of deeply dissected hilly land bordering and rising above the eastern edge of the Mississippi Alluvial Plain. These hills extend from western Kentucky to southeastern Louisiana. In the area of Clark Creek, the Bluff Hills consists of loess-covered ridges and numerous, steep-sided ravines carved by erosion into Pliocene fluvial sands and chert gravels overlying finer-grained Miocene fluvial and paluadal sands, silts, and clays. The Bluff Hills are characterized by dry slopes and ridges, moist slopes, and moist ravines. Adjacent to the Mississippi Alluvial Plain, the larger stream valleys contain narrow, moist bottomlands, and small cypress swamps. The elevation of the Bluff Hills ranges from 50–350 ft (15–107 m) with a relief of about 100–300 ft (30–91 m).

Within the Clark Creek Natural Area, Clark Creek cuts though over 400 ft (120 m) of unconsolidated Pleistocene, Pliocene, and Miocene sediments. From top to bottom, these sediments consist of about 20 ft (6.1 m) of Pleistocene loess; about 130 ft (40 m) of gravelly sand; and over 200 ft (61 m) of Miocene siltstone, silt, silty clay, clay and sand. The loess is exposed locally in steep ravine bluffs and manmade cuts in the surface of the ridge crests. It consists of yellowish-brown, calcareous, wind-blown silt. Formerly called the Citronelle Formation and now known as the Pre-Loess Deposits, the underlying Pliocene sediments consist of reddish pink, medium to coarse grained, poorly sorted crossbedded sand. This sand contains very thin layers of gravel ranging size from granules to small cobbles; purple to red clay lenses a few inches thick; and clay balls 0.32 to 1.26 in (8.1 to 32.0 mm) in diameter. The Pre-Loess Deposits are typically concealed by soil and redeposited loess except for small exposures along the entrance trail. The Miocene sediments exposed along the steep banks of Clark Creek belong to the Hattiesburg Formation. Here, the Hattiesburg Formation the includes mottled gray clay; two 5 ft (1.5 m) thick mottled dark red and very light gray, indurated, waterfall forming, siltstones; and other yellowish gray to olive to light gray silts, silty clays, and clays.

== Flora and fauna ==
The nature area has a mix of hardwood and pine forest with large beech and magnolia trees. The park includes the world record Mexican plum and bigleaf snowbell and the state of Mississippi record hophornbeam. Several uncommon trees that can be seen are Southern sugar maple, serviceberry, umbrella tree, pyramid magnolia, chinquapin oak and witch-hazel. The globally rare Carolina magnolia vine and many others are well marked. A checklist of the vascular plants was recorded in 1982, and it was one of the first surveys of plants in southwestern Mississippi.

The park includes migratory birds, various snake varieties (both venomous and non-venomous), a rare land snail, white-tail deer, chipmunks, the Southern red belly dace (a state endangered fish), foxes, coyotes, squirrels, armadillos, feral pigs, bobcats, cottontail rabbits and black bear as well as many other species.

== Activities and amenities ==
The park has both primitive and improved trails. The improved trails have been paved with pea gravel and include steep wooden stairs. Clark Creek's steeply sloping bluffs increase the difficulty of hiking. The length of the primitive trail is approximately 2.6 miles (4.2 km) and usually takes 3–5 hours to complete. The improved trails are approximately 1.75 miles (2.82 km) long and usually take around 2 hours to complete. Eight geocaches are located in the park.

== Restrictions ==
The state has imposed various restrictions on visitors: park use is limited to pedestrian traffic year round; motorized vehicles are not allowed; hunting is prohibited; potable water is not available on the trails; camping is not permitted; ropes may not be used for climbing; hikers are required to stay on paths or in creeks. Dogs must be leashed at all times.
