= J. P. Coleman State Park =

State park in Mississippi, United States

J.P. Coleman State Park
- Location within Mississippi
- Location: Tishomingo County, Mississippi, United States
- Coordinates: 34°56′39″N 88°10′18″W
- Elevation: 558 ft (170 m)
- Administrator: Mississippi Department of Wildlife, Fisheries, and Parks
- Designation: Mississippi state park
- Named for: Governor James P. Coleman
- Website: Official website

J.P. Coleman State Park is a state park in the U.S. state of Mississippi. It is located ten miles (16 km) north of Iuka off Mississippi Highway 25, on the banks of the Tennessee River and Pickwick Lake. The park is named for James P. Coleman, a former governor of Mississippi.

== Activities and amenities ==
The park features boating, waterskiing and fishing for smallmouth bass on 47,500-acre (19,200 ha) Pickwick Lake, primitive and developed campsites, cabins, cottages, motel, swimming pool, visitors center, picnic area, and a miniature golf course.
