= Muskegon (disambiguation) =

Muskegon, Michigan is a city in the United States.

Muskegon may also refer to:

- Muskegon, Mississippi
- Muskegon County, Michigan
- Muskegon Lumberjacks
- Muskegon River
- Muskegon High School
- Muskegon County Airport
