= Lake Lincoln State Park =

State park in Mississippi, United States

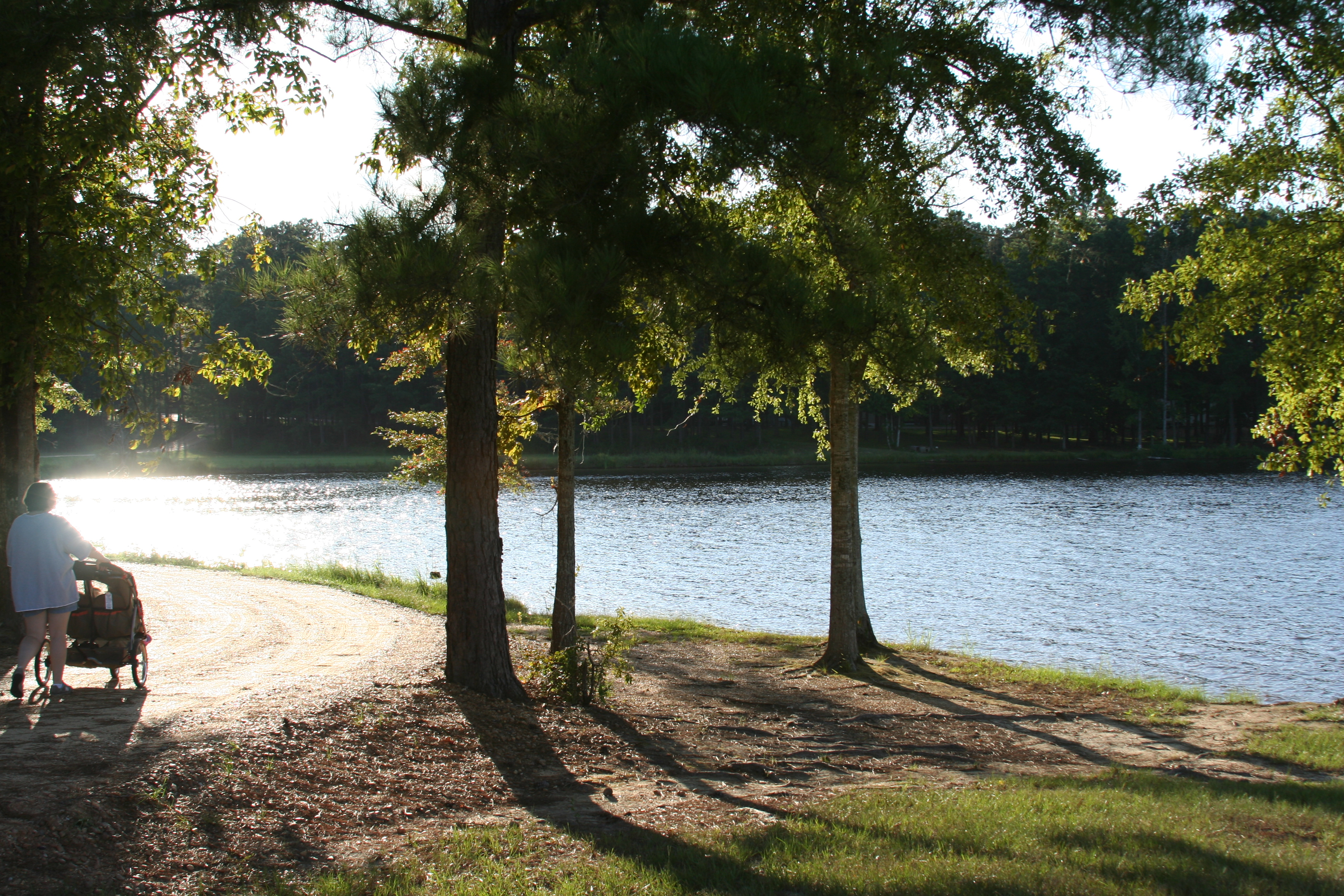

- Location within Mississippi
- Location: Lincoln County, Mississippi, United States
- Coordinates: 31°40′47″N 90°20′29″W
- Administrator: Mississippi Department of Wildlife, Fisheries, and Parks
- Designation: Mississippi state park
- Website: www.mdwfp.com/fishing-boating/lakes/lake-lincoln

Lake Lincoln State Park is a state park in the U.S. state of Mississippi. It is located off U.S. Highway 51, five miles (8.0 km) southeast of Wesson.

== Activities and amenities ==
The park features boating, swimming, waterskiing and fishing on 550-acre (220 ha) Lake Lincoln, overnight camping, as well as day-use. Park amenities include recreational vehicle camping, vacation cabins and cottages, beach, picnic area with shelters, nature trail, playground, playing fields, boat launch, laundry facilities, disc golf, and worship services.
