= Legion State Park =

State park in Mississippi, United States

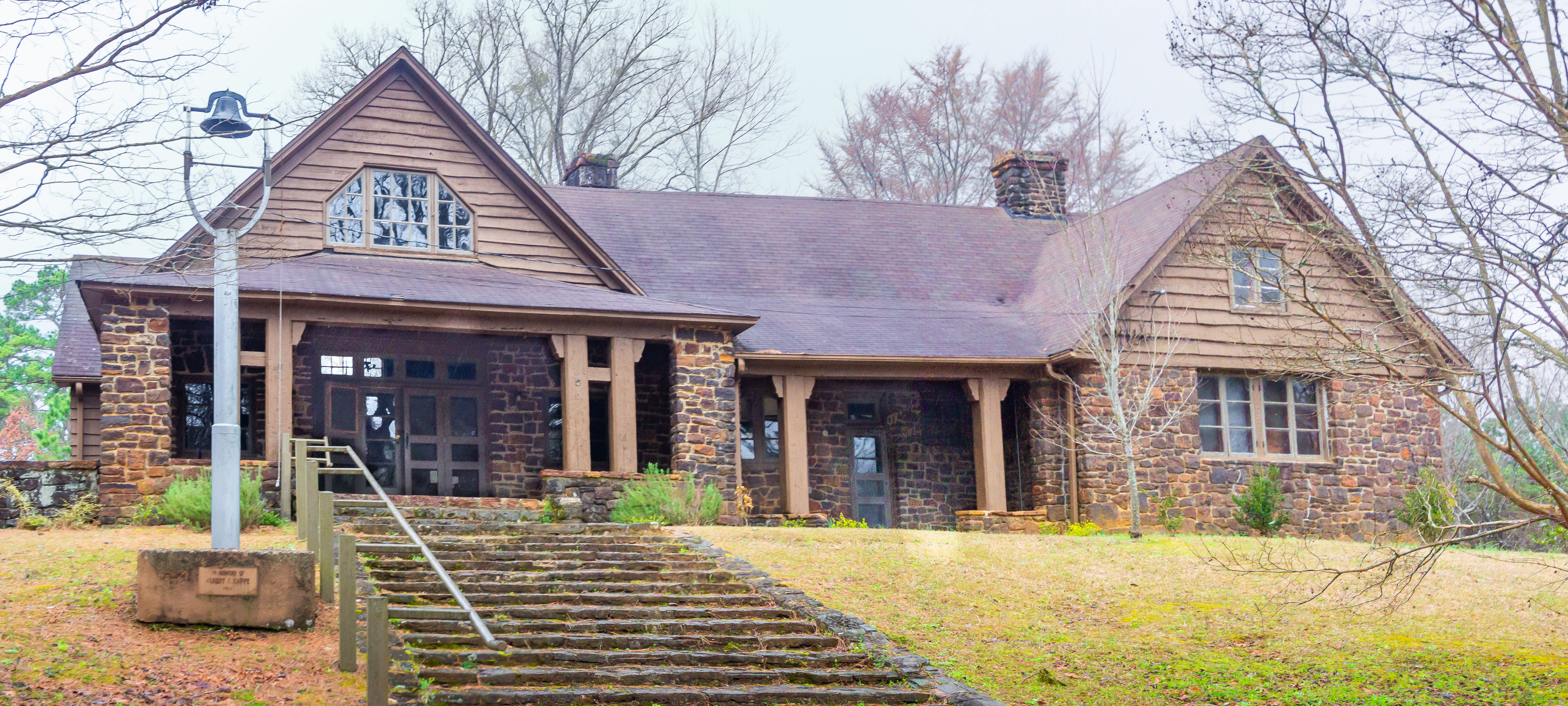
- Legion Lodge

- Location within Mississippi
- Location: Louisville, Mississippi, United States
- Coordinates: 33°09′05″N 89°02′32″W
- Area: 453 acres (183 ha)
- Elevation: 453 ft (138 m)
- Established: 1934
- Administrator: Mississippi Department of Wildlife, Fisheries, and Parks
- Designation: Mississippi state park
- Website: Official website
- Legion State Park
- U.S. National Register of Historic Places
- U.S. Historic district
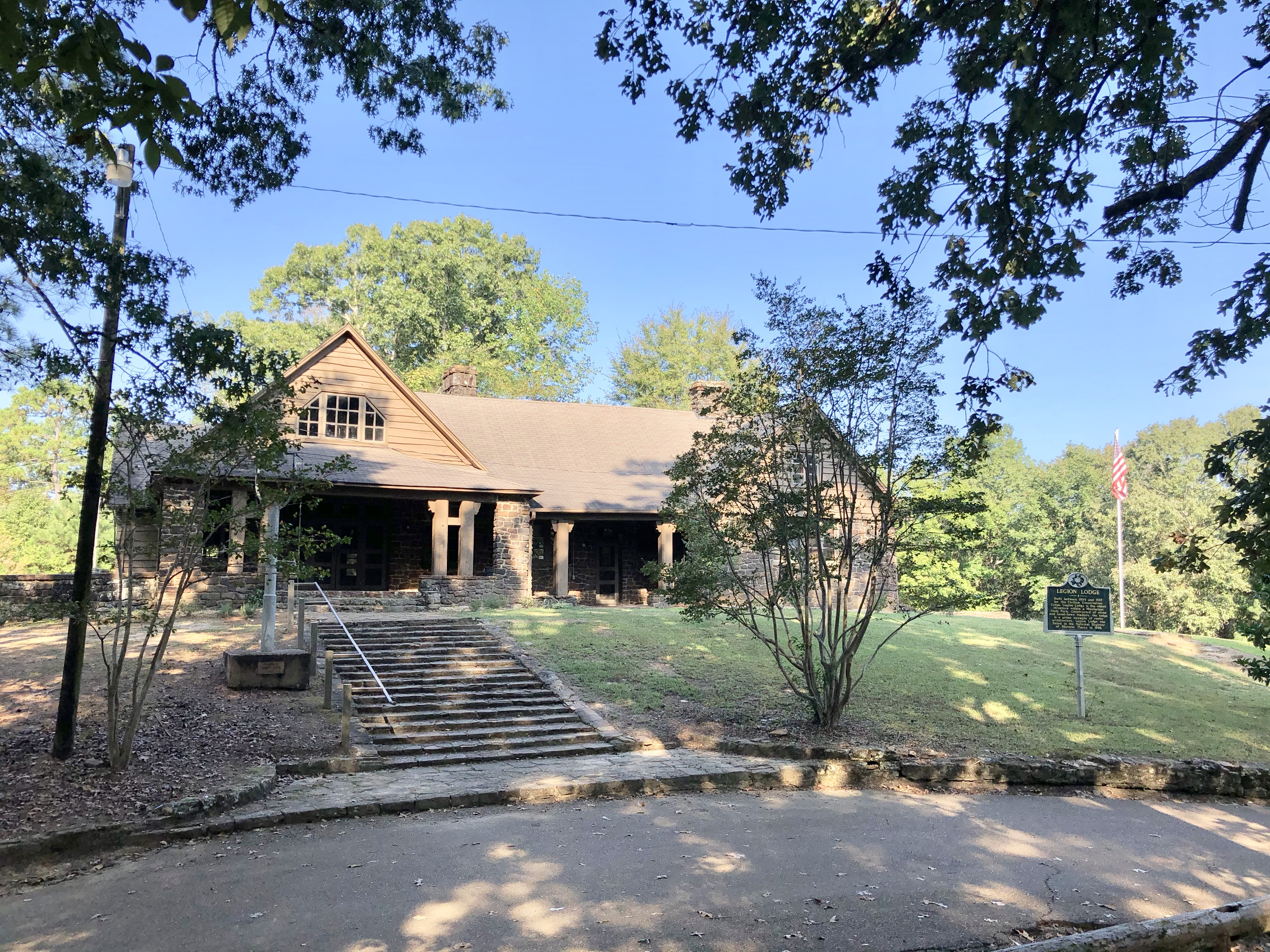
- Location: 635 Legion State Park Rd., Louisville, Mississippi
- Area: 120 acres (49 ha)
- Built: 1934
- Built by: CCC
- Architectural style: Rustic
- MPS: State Parks in Mississippi built by the CCC between 1934 - 1942
- NRHP reference No.: 98001333
- Added to NRHP: November 5, 1998

Legion State Park is public recreation area located on the north edge of the city of Louisville, Mississippi, and adjacent to Tombigbee National Forest. As Legion State Park Historic District, the state park entered the National Register of Historic Places in 1998. It is managed by the Mississippi Department of Wildlife, Fisheries and Parks.

== History ==
The park is one of the original Mississippi state parks developed by the Civilian Conservation Corps in the 1930s. The CCC began creating the park in October 1934; it opened the public in July 1937. It includes the Legion Lodge, a hand-hewn log structure that has remained unaltered since its construction. Legion Lodge is the oldest structure within a Mississippi state park.

== Activities and amenities ==
The park features fishing on two small lakes (12 acres (4.9 ha) and 4 acres (1.6 ha)), primitive and developed campsites, cabins and cottages, a 1.6-mile (2.6 km) nature trail, picnic area, and CCC-era visitors center.
