= Clarkco State Park =

State park in Mississippi, United States

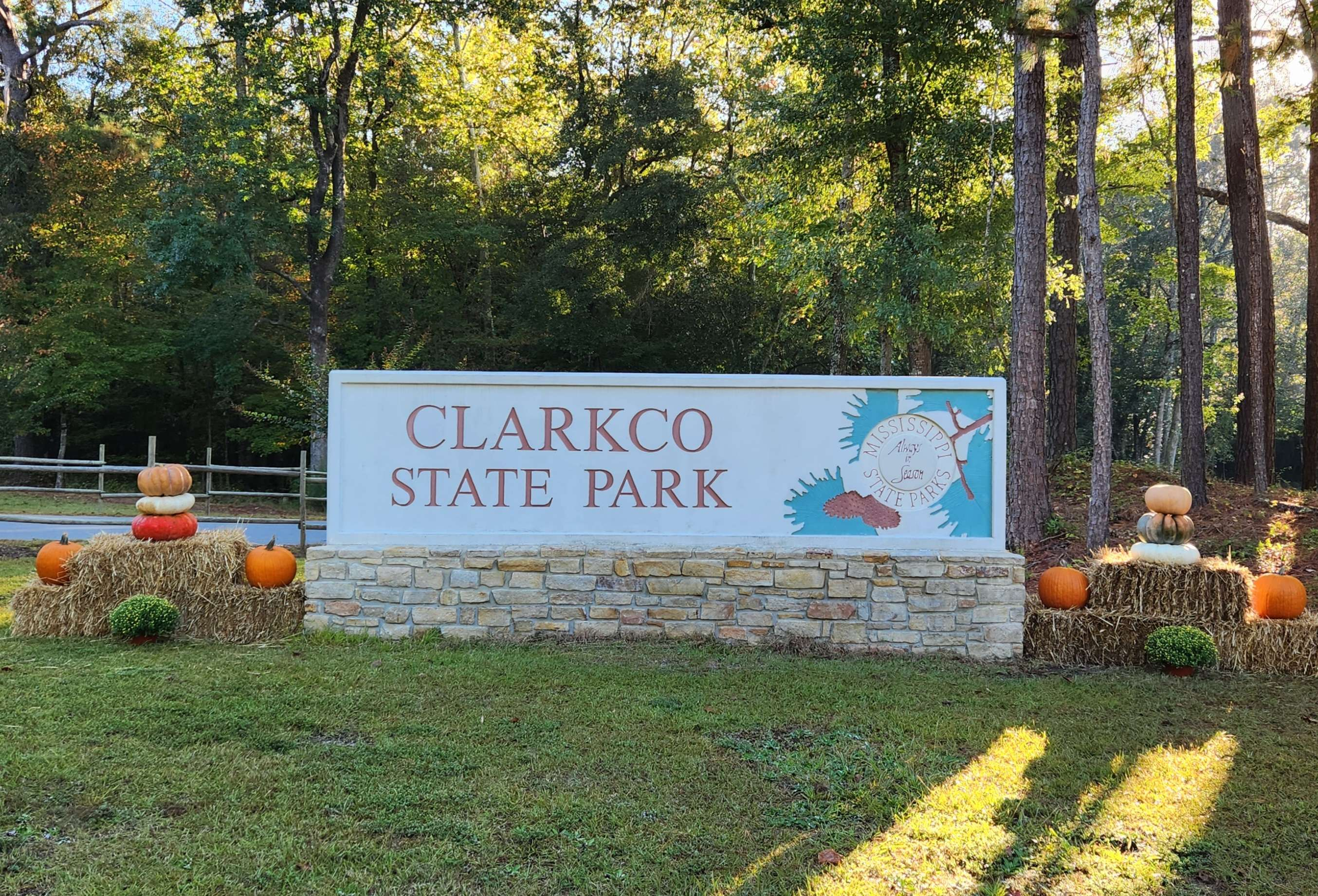

- Location within Mississippi
- Location: Clarke County, Mississippi, United States
- Coordinates: 32°02′25″N 88°43′49″W
- Area: 815 acres (330 ha)
- Elevation: 322 ft (98 m)
- Administrator: Mississippi Department of Wildlife, Fisheries, and Parks
- Designation: Mississippi state park
- Named for: Clarke County
- Website: Official website

Clarkco State Park is a public recreation area in the U.S. state of Mississippi located off Mississippi Highway 145 (old U.S. Highway 45), five miles (8.0 km) north of Quitman.

== Activities and amenities ==
The state park features boating, waterskiing, and fishing on a 65-acre (26 ha) lake, campsites, camper cabins and cottages. Other amenities include a visitors center, a disc golf course, a picnic area, and nature trails.
