= List of first women lawyers and judges in Mississippi =

This is a list of the first women lawyer(s) and judge(s) in Mississippi. It includes the year in which the women were admitted to practice law (in parentheses). Also included are women who achieved other distinctions such becoming the first in their state to graduate from law school or become a political figure

== Firsts in state history ==
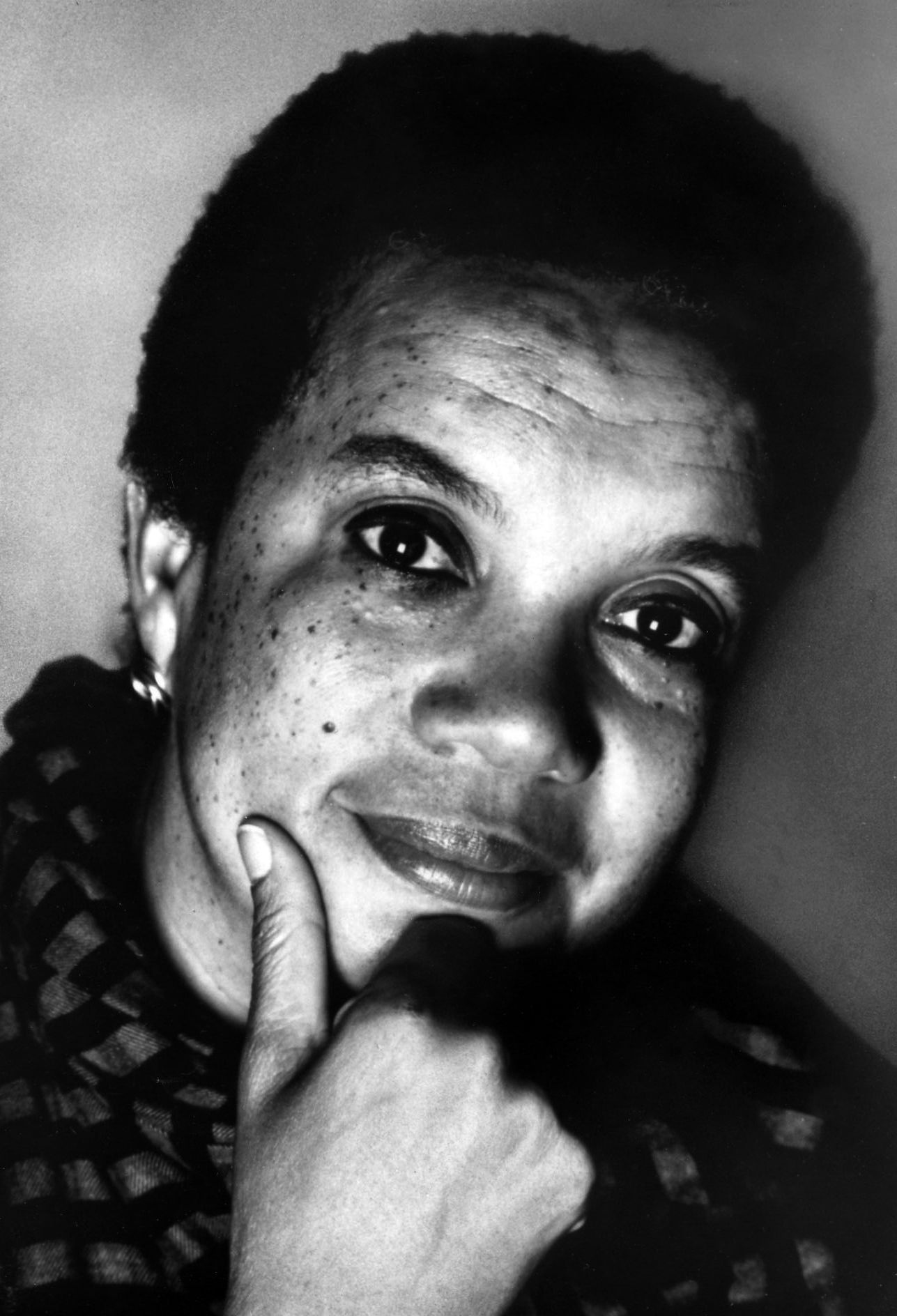
Marian Wright Edelman: First African American female lawyer in Mississippi (1963)

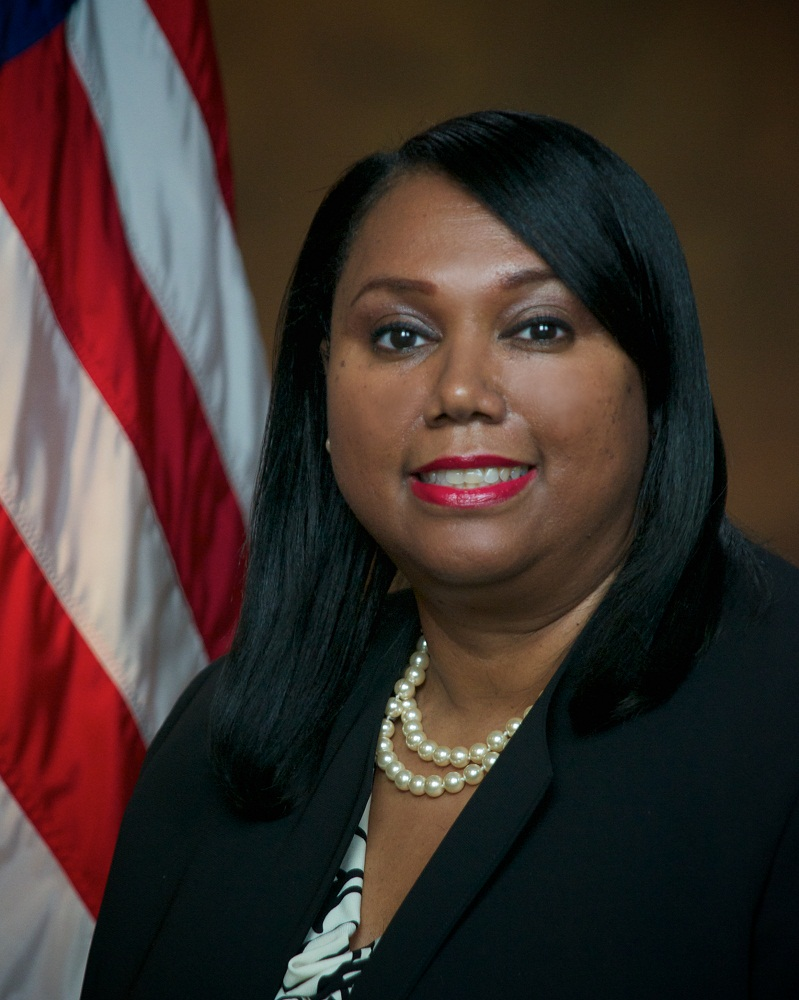
Felicia C. Adams: First African American female to serve as a U.S. Attorney in Mississippi (2011)

=== Lawyers ===
- First female: Lucy Harrison Greaves (1914)
  - Susie Blue Buchanan (1918)
- First African American female to try a case in Mississippi: Constance Baker Motley c. 1962
- First African American female: Marian Wright Edelman (1963)
- First known Hispanic American female: Doris Bobadilla (1991)
- First Choctaw (female): Rita Faye

=== State judges ===
- First female: Zelma Wells Price (1929) in 1955
- First African American female: Constance Slaughter-Harvey (1970) in 1976
- First female (Mississippi Supreme Court): Lenore L. Prather (1955) in 1982
- First female (Mississippi Court of Appeals): Mary Libby Payne in 1995
- First female (Chief Justice; Mississippi Supreme Court): Lenore L. Prather (1955) in 1998
- First African American female (Mississippi Court of Appeals): Ermea Russell in 2011
- First female (Chief Judge; Mississippi Court of Appeals): Donna Barnes in 2019
- First African American (female) (Twenty-Second Circuit Court District): Tomika Harris-Irving in 2019
- First Yemeni and Arab American (female): Asmaa Ali in 2026

=== Federal judges ===
- First African American (female) (Magistrate Judge; U.S. District Court for the Southern District of Mississippi): Linda Anderson in 2006
- First female (U.S. District Court for the Northern District of Mississippi): Sharion Aycock (1980) in 2007
- First female (bankruptcy court): Katharine Malley Samson in 2010
- First African American female (U.S. District Court for the Northern District of Mississippi): Debra M. Brown (1997) in 2013

=== Attorney General of Mississippi ===
- First female: Lynn Fitch in 2020

=== Assistant Attorney General ===
- First female: Evelyn Gandy (1947) in 1959

=== United States Attorney ===
- First female: Felicia C. Adams in 2011

=== Assistant United States Attorney ===
- First female: Euple Dozier in 1955

=== District Attorney ===
- First African American female: E. Faye Peterson in 2001

=== Assistant District Attorney ===
- First female: Kathy King Jackson in 1977:

=== Political Office ===
- First female (Lieutenant Governor of Mississippi): Evelyn Gandy (1947) from 1976-1980

=== Mississippi Bar Association ===
- First female: Joy Lambert Phillips (1980) in 2005
- First African American female: Patricia W. Bennett in 2018

== Firsts in local history ==
- Asmaa Ali: First Yemeni and Arab American (female) municipal court judge in Benoit, Bolivar County, Mississippi (2026)
- Patricia Burchell: First female to serve as the District Attorney for Forrest and Perry Counties, Mississippi (2010)
- Latrice Westbrooks: First African American female to serve as the Assistant District Attorney for the Second Circuit Court District (1997) [Hancock, Harrison and Stone Counties, Mississippi]
- Michele Purvis Harris (1987): First female (and African American female) to serve as the Chief City Prosecutor for the City of Jackson, Mississippi (1994) [Hinds, Madison and Rankin Counties, Mississippi]
- Mary Lee Toles: First African American (female) judge in Natchez, Mississippi [Adams County, Mississippi]
- Marie Kepper (1954): First female judge in Forrest County, Mississippi
- Clare Sekul Hornsby: First female to serve as the president of the Harrison County Bar Association
- Faye Peterson: First African American female to serve as the District Attorney for Hinds County, Mississippi
- Michele Purvis Harris (1987): First female (and African American female) to serve as the Chief City Prosecutor for the City of Jackson, Mississippi (1994) and the Public Defender for Hinds County, Mississippi (2012)
- Ermea Russell: First African American female to serve as a circuit judge in Hinds County, Mississippi (1998)
- LaRita Cooper-Stokes: First African American female elected to serve as a judge in Hinds County, Mississippi (2014)
- Tomie Green: First female (and African American) to serve as the Senior Circuit Judge in the Seventh Circuit Court District [Hinds County, Mississippi]
- Constance Slaughter-Harvey: First African American female graduate of the University of Mississippi School of Law [Lafayette County, Mississippi]. She was the first African American female judge in Scott County, Mississippi (1976).
- Callestyne Perry Hall-Crawford: First African American (female) to serve as the Assistant City Attorney of Greenwood, Leflore County, Mississippi (1996)
- Edna Loeb (1936): First female lawyer in Lowndes County, Mississippi
- Adrian McIntosh Haynes: First [African American] female judge in Monroe County, Mississippi (2020)
- Patricia Wise: First female (and African American female) to serve as President of the Magnolia Bar Association [Pike County, Mississippi]
- Shequeena McKenzie: First African American (female) judge in McComb, Mississippi (2022) [Pike County, Mississippi]
- Carol L. White-Richard: First African-American female to serve as the Public Defender for Washington County, Mississippi
- Caroline Crawley Moore: First female prosecutor in Winton County, Mississippi (2008)
- Ruth Campbell (1918): First female called to the Yazoo County Bar Association, Mississippi

== See also ==
- List of first women lawyers and judges in the United States
- Timeline of women lawyers in the United States
- Women in law

== Other topics of interest ==
- List of first minority male lawyers and judges in the United States
- List of first minority male lawyers and judges in Mississippi
