= Holmes County State Park =

State park in Mississippi, United States

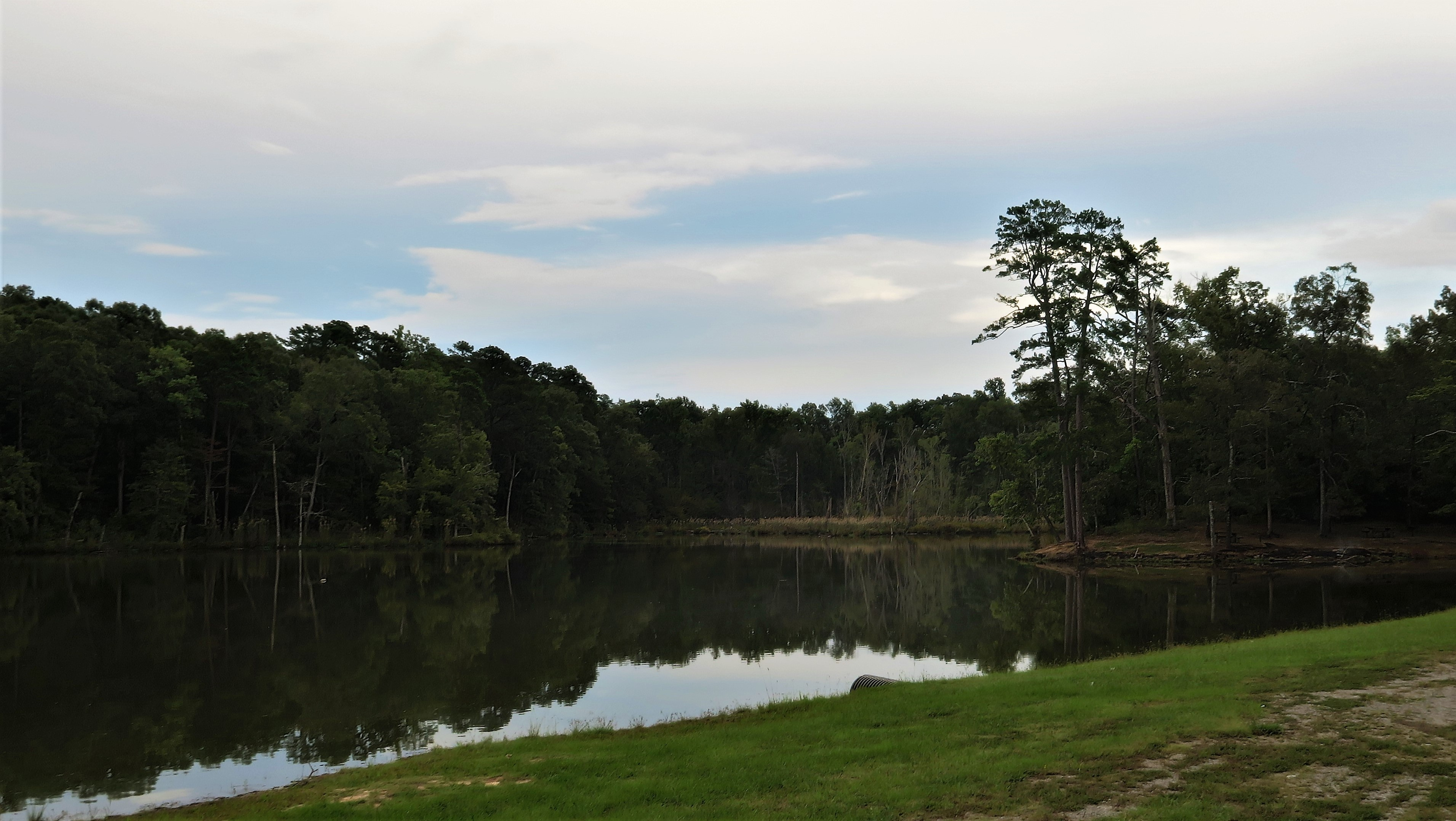

- Location within Mississippi
- Location: Holmes County, Mississippi, United States
- Coordinates: 33°01′44″N 89°55′19″W
- Area: 538 acres (218 ha)
- Elevation: 397 ft (121 m)
- Established: 1935
- Administrator: Mississippi Department of Wildlife, Fisheries, and Parks
- Designation: Mississippi state park
- Website: Official website
- Holmes County State Park
- U.S. National Register of Historic Places
- U.S. Historic district
- Nearest city: Durant, Mississippi
- Area: 20 acres (8.1 ha)
- Built: 1935
- Built by: CCC
- Architectural style: Rustic Style
- MPS: State Parks in Mississippi built by the CCC between 1934 - 1942
- NRHP reference No.: 97000769
- Added to NRHP: July 25, 1997

Holmes County State Park is a public recreation area in the U.S. state of Mississippi located off U.S. Route 51, six miles (9.7 km) southwest of Durant. The state park features two lakes, 45-acre (18 ha) English Lake and 14-acre (5.7 ha) Odum Lake.

== History ==
Development of Holmes County State Park was begun in 1935 by the CCC, which constructed Mississippi's first nine state parks. The park is significant for its 1930s rustic style architecture, with buildings designed to integrate with the natural landscape. The construction of this and other state parks in Mississippi has been deemed an "excellent example of cooperative efforts between the state and federal government to help reduce the unemployment rates during the Great Depression."

== Activities and amenities ==
The park offers 28 campsites built around two fishing lakes, a picnic area and shelters, and boat launch.
