= Harperville, Mississippi =

Harperville
- Census-designated place
- Location within Mississippi Location within the United States
- Coordinates: 32°29′40″N 89°29′22″W
- Country: United States
- State: Mississippi
- County: Scott

Area
  - Total: 1.44 sq mi (3.72 km^{2})
  - Land: 1.44 sq mi (3.72 km^{2})
  - Water: 0 sq mi (0.00 km^{2})
- Elevation: 407 ft (124 m)

Population (2020)
  - Total: 250
  - Density: 173.9/sq mi (67.15/km^{2})
- Time zone: UTC-6 (Central (CST))
  - Summer (DST): UTC-5 (CDT)
- ZIP code: 39080
- Area codes: 601 & 769
- GNIS feature ID: 693419

Harperville is a census-designated place (CDP) and unincorporated community in rural Scott County, Mississippi, United States. Harperville is located on Mississippi Highway 35, 9 miles (14 km) north of Forest. Harperville has a post office with ZIP code 39080. Per the 2020 Census, the population was 250.

== History ==
Harperville was named for G. W. Harper, a European-American settler.

In 1900, Harperville had a population of 130 and was home to a flour mill and sawmill.

Harperville was once home to Harperville College and an agricultural school.

In October 1898, a white mob retaliated for African Americans resisting arrest. The county sheriff gathered a posse, and the governor asked for National Guard support. Governor Anselm J. McLaurin went by train to Forest to assess the situation. After arresting several blacks, the sheriff took them to the county seat at Forest for their safety. The New Orleans Picayune reported that 11 blacks and one white had been killed."

== Demographics ==
Historical population
Census	Pop.	Note	%±
2020	250		—
U.S. Decennial Census; 2020

Harperville was first listed as a census designated place in the 2020 U.S. census.

Harperville CDP, Mississippi – Racial and ethnic composition Note: the US Census treats Hispanic/Latino as an ethnic category. This table excludes Latinos from the racial categories and assigns them to a separate category. Hispanics/Latinos may be of any race.
Race / Ethnicity (NH = Non-Hispanic)	Pop 2020	% 2020
White alone (NH)	180	72.00%
Black or African American alone (NH)	51	20.40%
Native American or Alaska Native alone (NH)	0	0.00%
Asian alone (NH)	1	0.40%
Native Hawaiian or Pacific Islander alone (NH)	0	0.00%
Other race alone (NH)	1	0.40%
Mixed race or Multiracial (NH)	6	2.40%
Hispanic or Latino (any race)	11	4.40%
Total	250	100.00%

== Education ==
It is in the Scott County School District.

East Central Community College covers Scott County, and operates the Forest/Scott County Career-Technical Center in Forest.

== Notable people ==
- Elsie McWilliams, country music songwriter
