= Contrell, Mississippi =

- Unincorporated community
- Location within Mississippi Location within the United States
- Coordinates: 32°32′48″N 89°37′04″W
- Country: United States
- State: Mississippi
- County: Scott
- Elevation: 397 ft (121 m)
- Time zone: UTC-6 (Central (CST))
  - Summer (DST): UTC-5 (CDT)
- Area codes: 601 & 769
- GNIS feature ID: 707287

Contrell is an unincorporated community in Scott County, Mississippi, United States.

== History ==
Contrell was established in 1883 as homes were built around the old Contrell Methodist Church but the settlement was extinct by 1900. Contrell was formerly home to a school.
