= Turner Cassity =

American poet (1929–2009)

- Born: Allen Turner Cassity; January 12, 1929; Jackson, Mississippi, U.S.
- Died: July 26, 2009 (aged 80); Atlanta, Georgia, U.S.
- Resting place: Forest, Mississippi, U.S.
- Education: Millsaps College; Stanford University; Columbia University
- Occupations: Poet; playwright; short story writer
- Parent(s): Allen Cassity; Dorothy Cassity

Allen Turner Cassity (January 12, 1929 in Jackson, Mississippi – July 26, 2009 in Atlanta) was an American poet, playwright, and short story writer.

== Life ==
He was the son of Dorothy and Allen Cassity, and grew up in Jackson and Forest, Mississippi. He graduated from Millsaps College and Stanford University with a master's degree.

Cassity was drafted into the United States Army and stationed in Puerto Rico from 1952 to 1954. He attended Columbia University on the GI Bill. He worked at the Robert W. Woodruff Library at Emory University, from 1962 to 1991, and also taught poetry there.

He is buried in Forest, Mississippi. His papers are at Emory University.

== Awards ==
- Georgia Author of the Year Award from the Georgia Writers Association.
- Levinson Prize for Poetry, for Devils and Islands
- Michael Braude Award of the American Academy of Arts and Letters
- Ingram Merrill Foundation Award
- National Endowment for the Arts Grant

== Works ==
- Watchboy, What of the Night?. Wesleyan University Press. 1966.
- Steeplejacks in Babel. D. R. Godine. 1973. ISBN 978-0-87923-070-8.
- Yellow for Peril, Black for Beautiful. G. Braziller. 1975. ISBN 978-0-8076-0775-6.
- The Defense of the Sugar Islands: a recruiting poster. Symposium Press. 1979.
- Phaëthon unter den Linden. Iris Press. 1979.
- Keys to Mayerling. Robert L. Barth. 1983. ISBN 978-0-941150-14-9.
- The Airship Boys in Africa. Hendricks. 1984. ISBN 978-0-943764-01-6.
- Hurricane Lamp. University of Chicago Press. 1986. ISBN 978-0-226-09615-5.
- Lessons. Para Press. 1987. ISBN 978-0-941150-57-6.
- To the Lost City, or, the Sins of Nineveh. R.L. Barth. 1989. ISBN 978-0-941150-74-3.
- Between the Chains. University of Chicago Press. 1991. ISBN 978-0-226-09617-9. "Turner Cassity."
- The Destructive Element: New and Selected Poems. Ohio University Press. 1998. ISBN 978-0-8214-1221-3.
- No Second Eden. Ohio University Press. 2002. ISBN 978-0-8040-1050-4.
- "Crystal but not crystal ball". The New Criterion. November 2006.
- Devils & islands: poems. Ohio University Press. 2007. ISBN 978-0-8040-1102-0.
- "Four poems (published posthumously)". Able Muse, Tribute Issue. December 2009.
- "Turner Cassity Reads at the Huntington Library, April 12, 2003 (video)". Able Muse, Tribute Issue. December 2009.

=== Verse plays ===
- Silver Out of Shanghai (1973)
- The Book of Alna (1985)

=== Anthologies ===
- John Hollander; David Lehman, eds. (1998). The Best American poetry, 1998. Scribner. ISBN 978-0-684-81453-7.
- Leon Stokesbury, ed. (1999). The made thing: an anthology of contemporary Southern poetry. University of Arkansas Press. p. 58. ISBN 978-1-55728-579-9. "Turner Cassity."
- Joseph Parisi; Stephen Young, eds. (2002). The Poetry anthology, 1912-2002. Ivan R. Dee. ISBN 978-1-56663-468-7.

=== Criticism ===
- Herbert A. Leibowitz, ed. (1994). "Double Dutch". Parnassus: twenty years of poetry in review. University of Michigan Press. ISBN 978-0-472-06577-6.
- "Hapax: A Book Review". Cortland Review. May 2007.

=== Ploughshares ===
- "Deep Depression in Key West". Ploughshares. Fall 1983. Archived from the original on August 28, 2007.
- "U-24 Anchors off New Orleans 1938". Ploughshares. Fall 1983. Archived from the original on September 9, 2007.
