= Mississippi Children's Museum =

Coordinates: 32.3288°N 90.1573°W

The Mississippi Children's Museum is a children's museum with locations in Jackson, Mississippi and Meridian, Mississippi. The location in Jackson is situated within the LeFleur's Bluff Education and Tourism Complex, and it was completed in 2010.

In 2021, the museum was awarded the National Medal for Museum and Library Service.
