= Mississippi Snake Grabbers =

- Genre: Reality television
- Developed by: N/A
- Directed by: Joel Stewart, Jim Thalheimer
- Creative director: John Wilson
- Starring: Jimmie Nichols Jr. Brad Vincent; Brent Shorter; Joey Mayes; Shane Gibson; Joey Rigby; Mike Plume
- Theme music composer: Jason Fratesi and the Dirt Road Jam Band
- Opening theme: "grabuone' theme song
- Country of origin: United States
- Original language: English
- No. of seasons: 1
- No. of episodes: 12 (list of episodes)

Production
- Executive producer: Ted Ellis
- Producers: Joel Stewart, Melissa McCrae
- Production locations: Lake Washington, Mississippi, USA
- Editor: Angela Young

Original release
- Network: Country Music Television
- Release: April 9 – June 25, 2015

Mississippi Snake Grabbers is a Canadian reality television series on CMT that follows a group of six men, all in law enforcement, from rural Scott County, Mississippi, who fish for snakes in Lake Washington. Amazon Prime streamed twelve full episodes where the show maintained five stars. The (Grabuone Outfitters) Mississippi Snake Grabbers also appeared in CMT Canada's Tornado Hunters Episode 3.

They have also appeared on Tru TV's Breaking Greenville, Almost Genius on the Science Channel, Mississippi Outdoors on Mississippi Public Broadcasting and several appearances on Look Around Mississippi with Walt Grayson. The Mississippi Snake Grabbers also host an Annual Snake Grabbing Rodeo in Greenville Mississippi every June.
