= Scott sisters =

Americans convicted of armed robbery

Jamie and Gladys Scott, often referred to as the Scott sisters, were two African-American sisters who were convicted of orchestrating a 1993 armed robbery in Forest, Mississippi, after accomplices made a plea deal. Each sister received double life sentences. This sentence has been criticized as too severe by a number of civil rights activists and prominent commentators on the grounds that the sisters had no previous criminal record and the robbery netted no more than eleven dollars.

Their convictions were upheld by the Mississippi Court of Appeals in 1996. The U.S. Supreme Court denied both their petition for appeal in 1997 and an appeal to vacate the conviction in 1998. Mississippi Governor Haley Barbour denied a petition for clemency in 2006. On December 29, 2010, Governor Barbour suspended their sentence on the condition that Gladys donate a kidney to her ailing sister, who was suffering kidney failure and required dialysis. The two women were released from prison on January 7, 2011. They moved to Pensacola, Florida. It was anticipated that they will remain on parole and pay a supervision fee to the state of Florida for the rest of their lives.

== Early life ==
Jamie Scott was born in 1972; Gladys, her younger sister was born in 1974. Their mother was Evelyn Rasco. They attended local schools. Jamie has a son, Richard, who was born before she went to prison.

== Trial, incarceration, and appeals ==
The sisters were charged with orchestrating a 1993 armed robbery in Forest, Mississippi. According to court testimony, the sisters convinced three male teens to assist them in an armed robbery. At a local mini mart, the sisters persuaded two men to drive them to a nearby nightclub and had their accomplices follow them. During the car trip, Jamie Scott complained of nausea. While the car was pulled over, the three teenagers exited the car behind them and robbed the two victims at gunpoint. During this robbery, it was claimed that one of the sisters held the shotgun. The victims testified that both sisters left with the three teenagers. Neither sister testified at the trial, and no one testified in support of their case. When the crime was committed, Jamie was twenty-one years old and Gladys was nineteen years old.

The sisters have denied their involvement in the armed robbery. They claim they were implicated as part of a plea deal by the teenagers, who pleaded guilty to the crime. Published estimates of the take from the robbery range from $11 to $200.

Confessed accomplice Howard Patrick, who was 14 at the time of the robbery, has testified that he was threatened by authorities that, if he did not agree to a plea bargain, he would be sent to a notoriously violent prison where he would likely be raped. Each of the sisters was sentenced to a double life prison sentence. The three males received sentences of eight years and were released after serving two years.

The attorney who represented the sisters at their trial was disbarred two years later for matters unrelated to the Scotts' case. The Supreme Court of Mississippi cited the attorney's "lack of diligence" and "failure to communicate with clients" in that unrelated case. The sisters have made no claim, however, that the attorney failed to provide them adequate representation in their defense. An affidavit stating that the Scott sisters were not involved in the robbery was signed in 1998 by one of the men who pleaded guilty to the crime, and submitted to the governor as part of a request for clemency.

The sisters' conviction was upheld by the Mississippi Court of Appeals and the U.S. Supreme Court denied their petition for certiorari; the lower courts' decisions will therefore stand. Mississippi Governor Barbour denied their earlier petition for clemency after the Parole Board recommended against pardon or commutation of sentence. Dan Turner, a spokesman for Barbour, stated the governor has been "very consistent in not substituting his judgment of guilt or innocence over the court" in pardoning criminals in the past.

== Suspension of sentence ==
Barbour granted clemency on December 29, 2010, stating

To date, the sisters have served 16 years of their sentences and are eligible for parole in 2014. Jamie Scott requires regular dialysis, and her sister has offered to donate one of her kidneys to her. The Mississippi Department of Corrections believes the sisters no longer pose a threat to society. Their incarceration is no longer necessary for public safety or rehabilitation, and Jamie Scott's medical condition creates a substantial cost to the State of Mississippi. The Mississippi Parole Board reviewed the sisters' request for a pardon and recommended that I neither pardon them, nor commute their sentence. At my request, the Parole Board subsequently reviewed whether the sisters should be granted an indefinite suspension of sentence, which is tantamount to parole, and have concurred with my decision to suspend their sentences indefinitely.

The governor's actions led to a heated public debate about the bioethics of a making an organ donation a condition for release.

== Responses to the Scott sisters' case ==
In the 21st century, the National Association for the Advancement of Colored People (NAACP) called for the sisters' release. Benjamin Jealous, president of the NAACP, made a forceful statement: "It makes you sick to think that this sort of thing can happen. That these women should be kept in prison until they die – well, that's just so utterly inhumane." While not asserting their innocence, Jealous asked Governor Barbour to pardon the women.

Ken Turner, a prosecutor who originally tried their case, stated in September 2010 that although he believes the sisters were guilty of the crime and involved in the robbery, it would be "appropriate" for their sentences to be commuted.

New York Times opinion columnist Bob Herbert wrote that the sisters should be released. He opined that evidence used to convict the sisters was "inconclusive" and that their sentences were unusually severe.

Pulitzer Prize-winning journalist Leonard Pitts wrote: "Mississippi stands guilty of a grievous offense against simple decency..." He went on to say "...Whatever the proximate cause of this ridiculous sentence, the larger cause is neon clear: the Scott sisters are black women in the poorest state in the union." The article did not assert their innocence nor guilt of the crime.

== Life after release ==
Because Jamie was morbidly obese when released from prison, she was found to be not fit to receive a transplant. She tried to lose the necessary weight and thanks to surgery, was able to shed 61 pounds by 2018. The two sisters had moved to Pensacola, Florida after their releases, to care for their mother, who died in 2013. While driving in April 2017, Jamie's car was hit by a drunk driver. After seven unsuccessful surgeries, she lost her right foot the next month, and parole restrictions have reportedly hampered her from receiving necessary medical treatment.

Jamie Scott died of complications of COVID-19 on November 9, 2021.
