= Kalem, Mississippi =

- Unincorporated community
- Location within Mississippi Location within the United States
- Coordinates: 32°21′18″N 89°35′34″W
- Country: United States
- State: Mississippi
- County: Scott
- Elevation: 449 ft (137 m)
- Time zone: UTC-6 (Central (CST))
  - Summer (DST): UTC-5 (CDT)
- Area codes: 601 & 769
- GNIS feature ID: 704979

Kalem is an unincorporated community in Scott County, Mississippi, United States. Kalem is located along U.S. Route 80, 3.6 miles (5.8 km) east of Morton.

Kalem was formed in 1911 and the community was initially known as Concord. The name Kalem was derived from Caley Regeons, an early citizen of the community. By the 1930s, the community was home to two stores and a school. Kalem is located on the Kansas City Southern Railroad.
