= Alan Heflin =

American politician

Member of the Mississippi Senate from the 31st district
- In office January 1984 – January 1992
- Preceded by: John Edwin Lee
- Succeeded by: Terry C. Burton

Personal details
- Born: October 1, 1939 Birmingham, Alabama
- Died: September 7, 2015 (aged 75) Morton, Mississippi
- Party: Democratic

Alan Michael Heflin (October 1, 1939 - September 7, 2015) was an American Democratic politician from Mississippi. He was a member of the Mississippi State Senate from 1984 to 1992.

== Early life ==
Alan Michael Heflin was born on October 1, 1939, in Birmingham, Alabama. He was the son of Ralph and Mildred Heflin. Alan graduated from John Carroll Catholic High School in 1957. Heflin then attended Saint Mary's College and Saint Bernard's College and received a degree in philosophy from the latter. After graduating, Heflin worked at Campbell's Soup Company in Birmingham, Alabama. He moved with his family to Forest, Mississippi, in 1968.

== Political career ==
From 1984 to 1988, Heflin represented the 31st district as a Democrat in the Mississippi State Senate. He was re-elected and also served from 1988 to 1992. While in the Senate, Heflin was the chairman of the Senate's Fees, Salaries, and Administration Committee.

== Later life ==
Heflin died on September 7, 2015, in Morton, Mississippi.
