= John Edwin Lee =

American politician

Member of the Mississippi House of Representatives from the 31st district
- In office January 1976 – January 1984
- Preceded by: Martin T. Smith
- Succeeded by: Alan Heflin

Personal details
- Born: January 27, 1928 Ludlow, Mississippi
- Died: September 22, 2014 (aged 86)
- Party: Democratic

John Edwin Lee (January 27, 1928 - September 22, 2014) was an American politician. He was a Democratic member of the Mississippi State Senate from 1976 to 1984.
