= Susie Blue Buchanan =

American lawyer

Susie Blue Buchanan was Mississippi's first female lawyer.

Buchanan, the eldest child of her family, was born on April 2, 1882, to William and Margaret Gunn Buchanan. She attended Brandon High School before receiving her higher education at Mississippi Synodical College, East Mississippi College, Harris Business College and Millsaps College. She worked as an educator before becoming an autodidact of law. Buchanan started reading law while working as a secretary in her father's law office in Brandon, Mississippi. When her father died, Buchanan continued to receive her legal tutelage from her father's law partner. She became the first woman admitted to practice law in Mississippi in 1916 upon being sworn before the Mississippi Supreme Court. In 1918, Buchanan became the first female registered with the Mississippi State Bar Association. In 1924, she began serving as the Deputy Chancery Clerk of Rankin County, Mississippi. She died on April 11, 1938.

== See also ==
- List of first women lawyers and judges in Mississippi
