= Mary Katherine Loyacano McCravey =

American painter

- Born: April 1, 1910; Forest, Mississippi, U.S.
- Died: March 27, 2009 (aged 98); Forest, Mississippi, U.S.
- Resting place: Eastern Cemetery, Forest, Mississippi, U.S.
- Education: Belhaven College
- Occupation: Artist
- Spouses: Joseph Loyacono; W. D. McCravey

Mary Katherine Loyacano McCravey (April 1, 1910 – March 27, 2009) was an American landscape and still life painter. She won the Mississippi Arts Commission's Governor's Excellence in the Arts Award for Lifetime Achievement in 2004.
