= Cardis Cardell Willis =

American comedian (1937–2007)

- Willis on stage before a comeback on a heckler
- Born: August 3, 1937; Forest, Mississippi, U.S.
- Died: February 10, 2007 (aged 69); Milwaukee, Wisconsin, U.S.

Comedy career
- Years active: c. 1950s–1990s
- Medium: Stand-up comedy
- Genres: Satire, observational comedy, black comedy, improvisational comedy, character comedy
- Subjects: Race relations, American politics, African-American culture, human sexuality, self-deprecation, everyday life, family

Cardis Cardell Willis (August 3, 1937 – February 10, 2007), better known as Cardell Willis and often billed as C. Cardell Willis, was an American comedian in Milwaukee, Wisconsin. He was locally known mostly in the 1970s, 1980s, and 1990s.

== Early life and education ==
Willis grew up in Forest, Mississippi. He finished high school in Indianapolis, Indiana, where he moved when he was 17.

== Death and legacy ==
He was mentor to Will Durst before his eventual fame in San Francisco, and Dobie Maxwell, as well as Richard Halasz, and Chris Barnes, all of whom are natives to Milwaukee.

He eventually developed Alzheimers, which robbed him of his ability to tell the storied jokes he was known for. He died on February 10, 2007, in a group home at age 69 after suffering two strokes. He was buried at Graceland Cemetery in Milwaukee.

A tribute show occurred to honor Willis' contributions and generosity to his peers and community. The MC was Dobie Maxwell, who called Willis his "comedy father". The tribute show was donation-supported, and the remaining proceeds were given to the Boy Scouts of America, in which Willis was a Scoutmaster and had received the Silver Beaver Award.

According to onmilwaukee.com, Mayor Barrett designated April 22, 2012, as Cardell Willis Day.
