= Woodrow Wilson (Nevada politician) =

American politician from Nevada (1915–1999)

Member of the Nevada Assembly from the 4th district
- In office 1966–1972

Member of the Clark County Commission
- In office 1980–1984

Personal details
- Born: August 28, 1915 Morton, Mississippi, US
- Died: December 15, 1999 (aged 84) Winchester, Nevada, US
- Party: Republican
- Occupation: Politician, banker

Woodrow Wilson (August 28, 1915 – December 25, 1999) was an American politician and banker who was the first African American to serve in the Nevada Assembly. A Republican, he served from 1966 to 1972 representing part of Clark County, Nevada. He later served on the Clark County Commission.

== Early life and career ==
Wilson was born in Morton, Mississippi, in 1915. He graduated from Piney Woods Country Life School in Mississippi in 1934 and, after several years as an itinerant laborer in Arizona and Chicago, moved to Las Vegas in 1942. There he obtained employment at the American Potash and Chemical Company, where he worked for thirty-eight years, retiring as a foreman. In 1951 he co-founded Westside Federal Credit Union to provide loans and credit to African Americans and other minorities in Clark County, serving as the credit union's treasurer-manager for 42 years and remaining on its board of directors until his death.

== Political career ==
During the 1950s, WIlson became active in civic affairs and the civil rights movement. He served as president and board member of the Las Vegas chapter of the NAACP and went on to chair the state advisory committee for the United States Commission on Civil Rights in 1957.

Despite being a Republican in the heavily Democratic House 4th district, Wilson was elected to the Nevada Assembly in 1966 and served three terms through 1972. He was the first African American to serve in the Nevada Legislature. As a member of the Assembly's education, civil defense, veterans affairs, and social welfare committees, he was instrumental in enacting the Nevada Fair Housing Act in 1971, along with bills to mandate fair employment practices and improve vocational education and workers' compensation. He also championed economic development and served as vice chair of the Clark County Economic Opportunity Board. In 1979, he was appointed to the Nevada Equal Rights Commission and went on to serve as chair.

In 1980, Wilson was elected to the Clark County Commission, becoming the second Black man to serve on the commission.

== Criminal conviction ==
Wilson resigned from the Clark County Commission in 1984 after his conviction on federal corruption charges stemming from an FBI sting operation called Operation Yobo, which also enshared a second Clark County commissioner and two state senators. Wilson pleaded guilty to accepting a $5,000 bribe from an FBI agent posing as an investor seeking Wilson's commission vote on a zoning change. Wilson received a two-year suspended sentence and three years' probation but spent no time in prison. He remained a respected figure within the Black community, and his supporters contended that the FBI sting amounted to an entrapment scheme. Wilson continued to work for the Westside Federal Credit Union until his retirement in 1993.

== Personal life ==
Wilson had six children and was married to Nora Wilson until her death in 1993. He later married Addie Mae Wilson. He was the first Black scout leader in Las Vegas. He died from diabetes complications at Sunrise Hospital in Winchester, Nevada, outside Las Vegas, in 1999 at the age of 84.
