= Shepard State Park =

State park in Mississippi, United States

- Location within Mississippi
- Location: Gautier, Mississippi, United States
- Coordinates: 30°22′36″N 88°37′45″W
- Area: 395 acres (160 ha)
- Elevation: 13 ft (4.0 m)
- Administrator: City of Gautier
- Designation: Mississippi state park
- Website: Official website

Shepard State Park is a public recreation area located off U.S. Highway 90 on the south side of the city of Gautier, Mississippi. The city has had responsibility for the state park's management since 2013.

== Activities and amenities ==
The park features boating and fishing on the Singing River, tent camping, developed RV campsites, 8 miles (13 km) of nature trails, playing fields, picnic area, playground, and an 18-hole disc golf course, Alligator Alley.
