= Pulaski, Mississippi =

- Unincorporated community
- Location within Mississippi Location within the United States
- Coordinates: 32°16′20″N 89°36′08″W
- Country: United States
- State: Mississippi
- County: Scott
- Elevation: 417 ft (127 m)
- Time zone: UTC-6 (Central (CST))
  - Summer (DST): UTC-5 (CDT)
- ZIP code: 39152
- Area codes: 601 & 769
- GNIS feature ID: 694486

Pulaski is an unincorporated community in Scott County, Mississippi, United States. Its ZIP code is 39152.

== History ==
Pulaski is named from Casimir Pulaski. The community was once home to a school, cotton gin, sawmill, and two churches.

In 1900, Pulaski had a population of 200.
