= Kalem railway station =

Railway station in South Goa

Kalem Railway Station

General information
- Location: Kulem, Sanguem, South Goa, Goa; India
- Coordinates: 15.2919°N 74.1845°E
- Elevation: 55 metres (180 ft)
- System: Indian Railways station
- Owner: Indian Railways
- Operator: South Western Railway zone
- Line: Guntakal–Vasco da Gama section
- Platforms: 1
- Tracks: 2
- Connections: Auto stand

Construction
- Structure type: Standard (on-ground station)
- Parking: No
- Cycle facilities: No

Other information
- Status: Active
- Station code: KM
- Zone(s): South Western Railway zone
- Division(s): Hubli

Services
Preceding station	Indian Railways	Following station
Kudchade towards ?	South Western Railway zone Guntakal–Vasco da Gama section	Kulem towards ?
Location

Kalem Railway Station is a small railway station in South Goa district, Goa. Its code is KM. It serves Sanguem town. The station consists of one platform. The platform is not well sheltered. It lacks many facilities including water and sanitation.

== Major trains ==
- Vasco da Gama–Kulem Passenger
