= Roosevelt State Park =

State park in Mississippi, United States

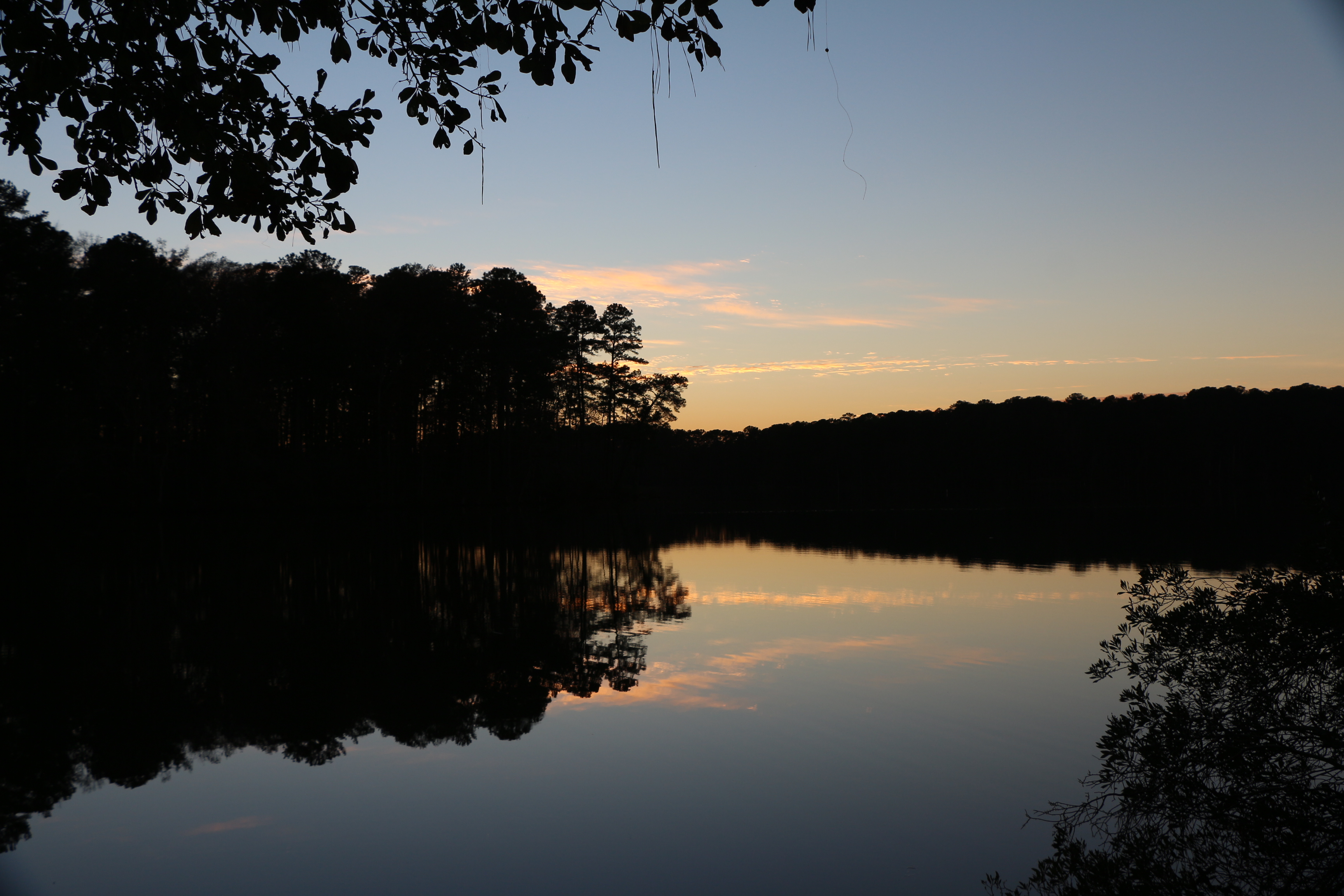

- Location within Mississippi
- Location: Morton, Mississippi, United States
- Coordinates: 32°19′12″N 89°40′09″W
- Area: 550 acres (220 ha)
- Elevation: 505 ft (154 m)
- Established: 1935
- Administrator: Mississippi Department of Wildlife, Fisheries, and Parks
- Designation: Mississippi state park
- Named for: President Franklin D. Roosevelt
- Website: Official website
- Roosevelt State Park
- U.S. National Register of Historic Places
- U.S. Historic district
- Area: 20 acres (8.1 ha)
- Built: 1935
- Built by: Civilian Conservation Corps (CCC)
- Architectural style: Rustic
- MPS: State Parks in Mississippi built by the CCC between 1934 - 1942
- NRHP reference No.: 97001436
- Added to NRHP: December 1, 1997

Roosevelt State Park is a public recreation area located off Interstate 20 on the southwest side of Morton, Mississippi. The state park surrounds 150-acre (61 ha) Shadow Lake at the western edge of Bienville National Forest, between Jackson and Meridian. It is managed by the Mississippi Department of Wildlife, Fisheries and Parks.

== History ==
The park was one of the original Mississippi state parks built by the Civilian Conservation Corps in the 1930s. The CCC began work August 1935; the park opened in April 1940.

== Activities and amenities ==
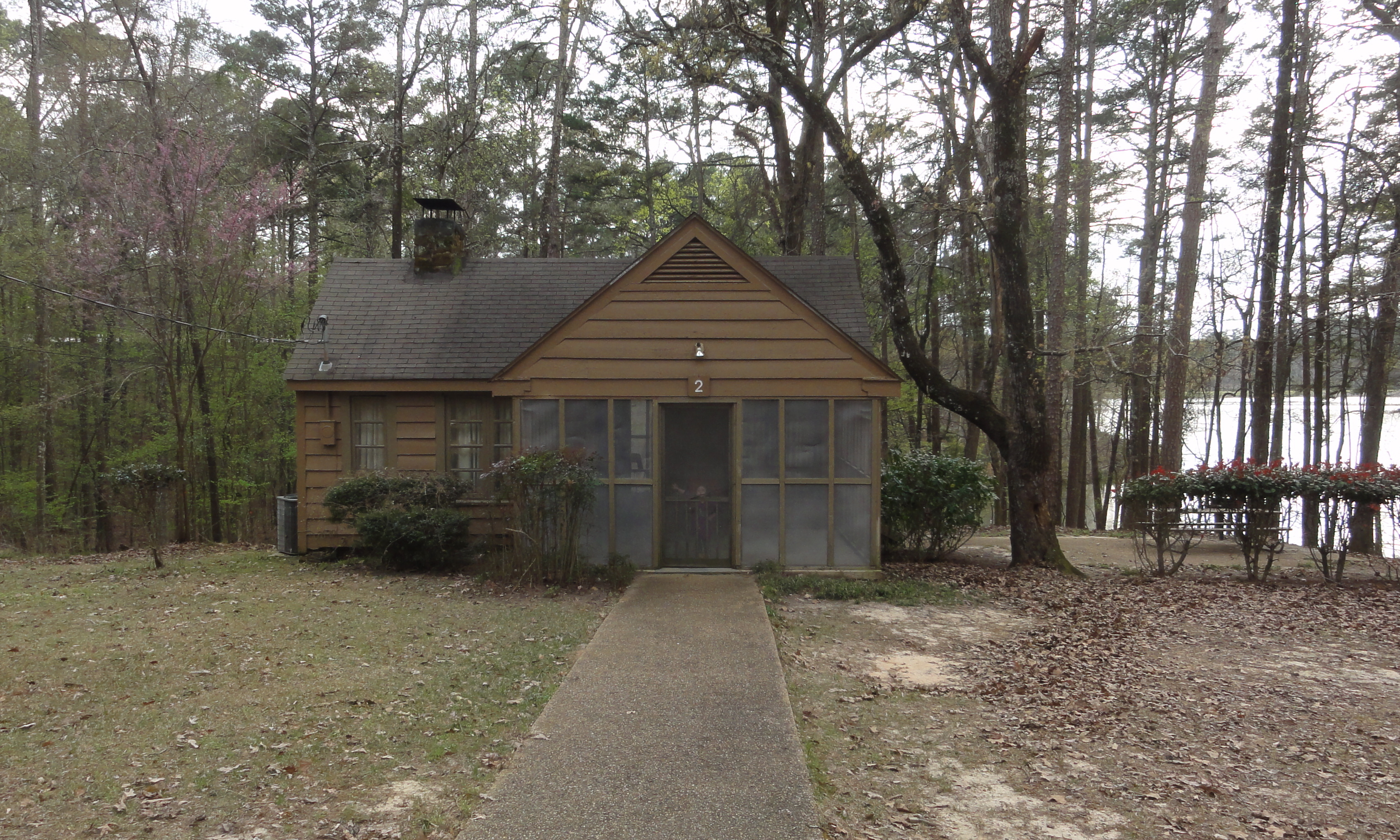
Cabin

The park features boating, waterskiing and fishing, primitive and developed campsites, cabins, motel, and group camping in dormitory-style cabins. Other features include 4.8 miles of nature trails, a scenic overlook with views of Bienville National Forest, tennis courts, softball field, picnic areas and pavilions, playground equipment, visitors center, 18-hole disc golf course, and swimming pool. The 600-seat Livingston Performing Arts & Media Center is also located in the park.

== See also ==
- List of Mississippi state parks
