= Mississippi Museum of Natural Science =

Museum in Jackson, Mississippi

Coordinates: 32.3251°N 90.1573°W

- Established: 1932
- Location: Jackson, Mississippi, United States
- Website: www.mdwfp.com/location/museum-natural-science

The Mississippi Museum of Natural Science is a museum located in Jackson, Mississippi, United States. It is the largest museum in Mississippi.

== History ==
The museum was founded in 1933 by Francis A. Cook as a part of the Mississippi Game and Fish Commission. Francis 'Fannie' Cook led a drive to found the Game and Fish Commission the 1920s, including traveling education exhibits at local and state fairs. Then in 1932, Cook wrote the state's first game laws, and became the museum's first director after the Commission was established by the legislature. In the last seventy years, the main attendees have been the school children and educational institutions.

== Exhibits ==
The museum is located in LeFleur's Bluff State Park and features aquariums, habitat exhibits, and nature trails specializing in the flora and fauna of Mississippi. The museum also houses the state's systematic collections, containing more than a million specimens of fish, reptiles, amphibians, birds, mammals, invertebrates, plants, and fossils. The most complete and most used of these collections of taxa are the freshwater fish and mollusks. This museum acts as both a center for research and education. The mission for the Mississippi Museum of Natural Science is to promote understanding and appreciation of Mississippi's biological diversity through collections, research, scientific data bases, education, and exhibits; and to inspire the people of Mississippi to respect the environment and to preserve natural Mississippi.
