= Scott County School District (Mississippi) =

School district in Mississippi

The Scott County School District is a public school district based in Scott County, Mississippi (USA). The district's headquarters are in Forest.

The district serves the city of Morton and the town of Sebastopol, the community of Harperville. It also includes most of Lake (the portion in Scott County), a portion of Hillsboro and a small portion of Forest, as well as most rural areas in Scott County.

== History ==
A 1969 desegregation order allowed people in a southern part of Leake County to attend the Scott County district's Sebastapol school. In 2010 a court ordered that such students (except those with parents with jobs in the relevant county) attend schools of the Leake County School District. This decision affected about 70-75 students.

== Schools ==
- Morton High School (grades 9-12)
- Lake High School (grades 9-12)
- Scott Central Attendance Center (grades K-12)
- Sebastopol Attendance Center (grades K-12)
- Bettye Mae Jack Middle School (grades 5-8)
- Lake Middle School (grades 5-8)
- Lake Elementary School (grades K-4)
- Morton Elementary School (grades K-4)
- Lake Elementary School (grades K-4)

== Demographics ==
=== 2006-07 school year ===
There were a total of 3,938 students enrolled in the Scott County School District during the 2006–2007 school year. The gender makeup of the district was 47% female and 53% male. The racial makeup of the district was 42.43% African American, 52.92% White, 4.11% Hispanic, 0.30% Asian, and 0.23% Native American. 56.4% of the district's students were eligible to receive free lunch.

=== Previous school years ===
School year	Enrollment	Sex make-up		Racial make-up				
School year	Enrollment	Female	Male	Asian	African American	Hispanic	Native American	White
2005-06	3,909	48%	52%	0.23%	41.70%	4.30%	0.23%	53.54%
2004-05	3,931	48%	52%	0.25%	41.90%	3.92%	0.18%	53.75%
2003-04	3,883	48%	52%	0.21%	42.70%	3.55%	0.23%	53.31%
2002-03	3,821	49%	51%	0.10%	42.32%	3.04%	0.24%	54.31%

== Accountability statistics ==
	2006-07	2005-06	2004-05	2003-04	2002-03
District Accreditation Status	Accredited	Accredited	Accredited	Accredited	Accredited
School Performance Classifications
Level 5 (Superior Performing) Schools	1	1	1	0	0
Level 4 (Exemplary) Schools	2	3	2	3	3
Level 3 (Successful) Schools	4	3	4	4	3
Level 2 (Under Performing) Schools	0	0	0	0	1
Level 1 (Low Performing) Schools	0	0	0	0	0
Not Assigned	0	0	0	0	0

== See also ==
- List of school districts in Mississippi
