= Muskegon, Mississippi =

- Unincorporated community
- Location within Mississippi Location within the United States
- Coordinates: 32°20′54″N 89°21′08″W
- Country: United States
- State: Mississippi
- County: Scott
- Elevation: 433 ft (132 m)
- Time zone: UTC-6 (Central (CST))
  - Summer (DST): UTC-5 (CDT)
- Area codes: 601 & 769
- GNIS feature ID: 694137

Muskegon is an unincorporated community in Scott County, in the U.S. state of Mississippi.

== History ==
The community is named after Muskegon, Michigan. Muskegon is located along the Kansas City Southern Railroad.

Muskegon was once home to the Muskegon Lumber Company, which operated a sawmill in the area.
