= Kalem (surname) =

Kalem is a surname. Notable people with the surname include:

- Mohamed Amine Kalem (born 1982), Italian-Tunisian para table tennis player
- Toni Kalem (born 1956), American actress, screenwriter and director
