= Forest, Mississippi =

- City
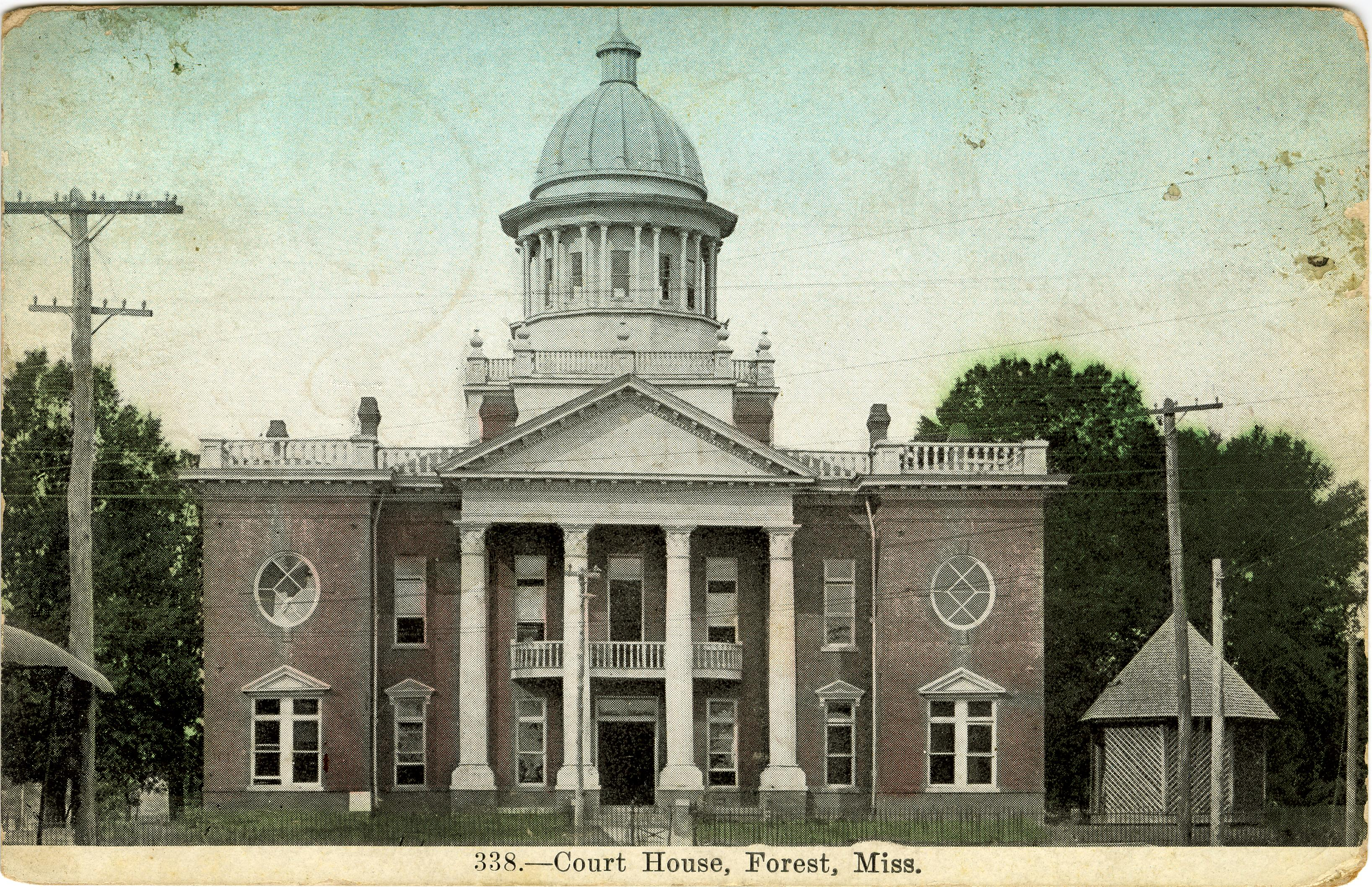
- Scott County Courthouse in Forest

- Flag Seal

- Location of Forest, Mississippi

- Location in the United States
- Coordinates: 32°21′49″N 89°28′31″W
- Country: United States
- State: Mississippi
- County: Scott

Government
  - Mayor: Nancy Chambers (D)

Area
  - Total: 13.10 sq mi (33.93 km^{2})
  - Land: 13.08 sq mi (33.87 km^{2})
  - Water: 0.023 sq mi (0.06 km^{2})
- Elevation: 476 ft (145 m)

Population (2020)
  - Total: 5,430
  - Density: 415/sq mi (160.3/km^{2})
- Time zone: UTC-6 (Central (CST))
  - Summer (DST): UTC-5 (CDT)
- ZIP code: 39074
- Area code: 601
- FIPS code: 28-25340
- GNIS feature ID: 0693243
- Website: www.cityofforest.com

Forest is a city in and the county seat of Scott County, Mississippi, United States. As of the 2020 census, Forest had a population of 5,430. The population is a minority-majority.

== Geography ==
According to the United States Census Bureau, the city has a total area of 13.0 square miles (34 km^{2}), of which 13.0 square miles (34 km^{2}) is land and 0.04 square miles (0.10 km^{2}) (0.15%) is water.

== Demographics ==
Historical population
| Census | Pop. | Note | %± |
|---|---|---|---|
| 1890 | 547 | | — |
| 1900 | 761 | | 39.1% |
| 1910 | 1,136 | | 49.3% |
| 1920 | 1,188 | | 4.6% |
| 1930 | 2,176 | | 83.2% |
| 1940 | 2,735 | | 25.7% |
| 1950 | 2,874 | | 5.1% |
| 1960 | 3,917 | | 36.3% |
| 1970 | 4,085 | | 4.3% |
| 1980 | 5,229 | | 28.0% |
| 1990 | 5,060 | | −3.2% |
| 2000 | 5,987 | | 18.3% |
| 2010 | 5,684 | | −5.1% |
| 2020 | 5,430 | | −4.5% |
U.S. Decennial Census

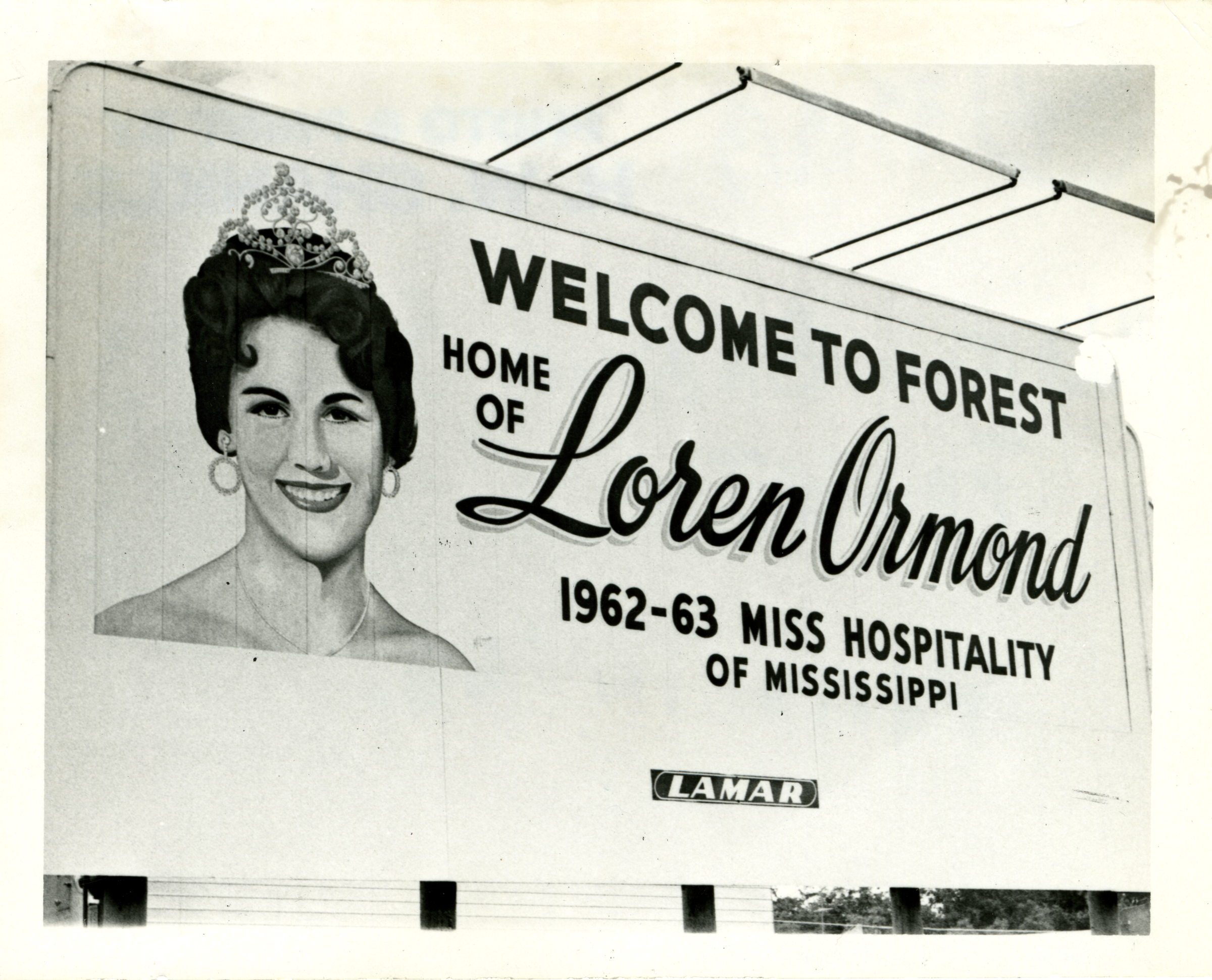
Welcome sign, 1963

=== Racial and ethnic composition ===
Forest city, Mississippi – Racial and ethnic composition Note: the US Census treats Hispanic/Latino as an ethnic category. This table excludes Latinos from the racial categories and assigns them to a separate category. Hispanics/Latinos may be of any race.
| Race / Ethnicity (NH = Non-Hispanic) | Pop 2000 | Pop 2010 | Pop 2020 | % 2000 | % 2010 | % 2020 |
|---|---|---|---|---|---|---|
| White alone (NH) | 2,136 | 1,538 | 1,123 | 35.68% | 27.06% | 20.68% |
| Black or African American alone (NH) | 3,002 | 2,713 | 2,319 | 50.14% | 47.73% | 42.71% |
| Native American or Alaska Native alone (NH) | 19 | 11 | 20 | 0.32% | 0.19% | 0.37% |
| Asian alone (NH) | 26 | 12 | 39 | 0.43% | 0.21% | 0.72% |
| Native Hawaiian or Pacific Islander alone (NH) | 2 | 21 | 0 | 0.03% | 0.37% | 0.00% |
| Other race alone (NH) | 1 | 5 | 7 | 0.02% | 0.09% | 0.13% |
| Mixed race or Multiracial (NH) | 40 | 38 | 81 | 0.67% | 0.67% | 1.49% |
| Hispanic or Latino (any race) | 761 | 1,346 | 1,841 | 12.71% | 23.68% | 33.90% |
| Total | 5,987 | 5,684 | 5,430 | 100.00% | 100.00% | 100.00% |

=== 2020 census ===
As of the 2020 census, Forest had a population of 5,430. The median age was 31.1 years. 31.5% of residents were under the age of 18 and 13.4% of residents were 65 years of age or older. For every 100 females there were 94.7 males, and for every 100 females age 18 and over there were 89.1 males age 18 and over.

0.0% of residents lived in urban areas, while 100.0% lived in rural areas.

There were 1,849 households in Forest, of which 40.2% had children under the age of 18 living in them. Of all households, 33.5% were married-couple households, 19.8% were households with a male householder and no spouse or partner present, and 40.6% were households with a female householder and no spouse or partner present. About 25.9% of all households were made up of individuals and 10.7% had someone living alone who was 65 years of age or older.

There were 2,016 housing units, of which 8.3% were vacant. The homeowner vacancy rate was 1.7% and the rental vacancy rate was 6.5%.

Racial composition as of the 2020 census
| Race | Number | Percent |
|---|---|---|
| White | 1,244 | 22.9% |
| Black or African American | 2,373 | 43.7% |
| American Indian and Alaska Native | 86 | 1.6% |
| Asian | 39 | 0.7% |
| Native Hawaiian and Other Pacific Islander | 0 | 0.0% |
| Some other race | 1,352 | 24.9% |
| Two or more races | 336 | 6.2% |

=== 2000 census ===
As of the census of 2000, there were 5,987 people, 2,085 households, and 1,478 families residing in the city. The population density was 460.0 inhabitants per square mile (177.6/km^{2}). There were 2,257 housing units at an average density of 173.4 per square mile (67.0/km^{2}). The racial makeup of the city was 40.35% White, 50.88% African American, 0.40% Native American, 0.53% Asian, 0.07% Pacific Islander, 5.85% from other races, and 1.92% from two or more races. Hispanic or Latino of any race were 12.71% of the population.

There were 2,085 households, out of which 36.5% had children under the age of 18 living with them, 41.6% were married couples living together, 24.1% had a female householder with no husband present, and 29.1% were non-families. 23.7% of all households were made up of individuals, and 10.6% had someone living alone who was 65 years of age or older. The average household size was 2.80 and the average family size was 3.25.

In the city, the population was spread out, with 29.3% under the age of 18, 10.6% from 18 to 24, 27.5% from 25 to 44, 19.7% from 45 to 64, and 13.0% who were 65 years of age or older. The median age was 32 years. For every 100 females, there were 94.8 males. For every 100 females age 18 and over, there were 91.5 males.

The median income for a household in the city was $25,638, and the median income for a family was $29,767. Males had a median income of $23,825 versus $17,277 for females. The per capita income for the city was $16,484. About 21.6% of families and 23.5% of the population were below the poverty line, including 29.5% of those under age 18 and 13.8% of those age 65 or over.

== Economy ==
Forest is home to several poultry processing plants, including Koch Foods, Tyson Foods, and the Forest Packing Company.

Raytheon has a consolidated manufacturing center in Forest; it builds electronic equipment for radars and other sensor systems.

== Education ==
Almost all of the City of Forest is served by the Forest Municipal School District. Schools include Forest Elementary School, Hawkins Middle School and Forest High School.

A small portion is in the Scott County School District.

East Central Community College covers Scott County, and operates the Forest/Scott County Career-Technical Center in Forest.

== Infrastructure ==
=== Transportation ===
Forest is served by Interstate 20, U.S. Route 80, and Mississippi Highways 21, 35, and 501. Air transportation is available through G. V. Montgomery Airport or the nearby Jackson-Evers International Airport (JAN).

== Notable people ==
- Rashard Anderson, football player
- Jim Ashmore, former professional basketball player
- Turner Cassity, poet, playwright, and short story writer
- Arthur "Big Boy" Crudup (1905–1974), blues musician, who wrote "That's All Right (Mama)" and is honored with a Mississippi Blues Trail marker
- Anthony Derricks, former Arena Football League player
- James Eastland (1904–1986), segregationist United States Senator from Mississippi
- T-Model Ford, blues musician
- Sheila Guyse (1925–2013), actress and recording artist
- Alan Heflin, former member of the Mississippi Senate
- Erle Johnston, public official, newspaperman, author, mayor of Forest from 1981 to 1985
- Percy Mercer Lee, former Chief Justice of the Supreme Court of Mississippi
- Roy Noble Lee, former Chief Justice of the Supreme Court of Mississippi. Son of Percy Mercer Lee.
- Tom Stewart Lee, senior United States district judge of the United States District Court for the Southern District of Mississippi
- Mary Katherine Loyacano McCravey, painter
- Dollree Mapp (1923–2014), appellant in the landmark Supreme Court case Mapp v. Ohio
- Tom Miles, former member of the Mississippi House of Representatives
- Lewis Nordan, writer
- Abhay Patel, businessman and politician
- Marlo Perry, former NFL linebacker
- Greene Fort Pinkston, physician
- Todd Pinkston, former NFL wide receiver, Philadelphia Eagles
- Jamie and Gladys Scott, sisters convicted in a controversial robbery case that drew national attention for its severe sentencing
- Kevin Sessums, writer
- Constance Slaughter-Harvey, first African-American female judge in Mississippi
- Red Stroud, former professional basketball player
- Donald Triplett, first person to be diagnosed with autism
- Victoria Vivians, basketball player, played for Mississippi State University before being drafted by the Indiana Fever of the WNBA
- Duke Washington, NFL running back
- Cardis Cardell Willis, comedian
