= Scott County, Mississippi =

County in Mississippi, United States

- County
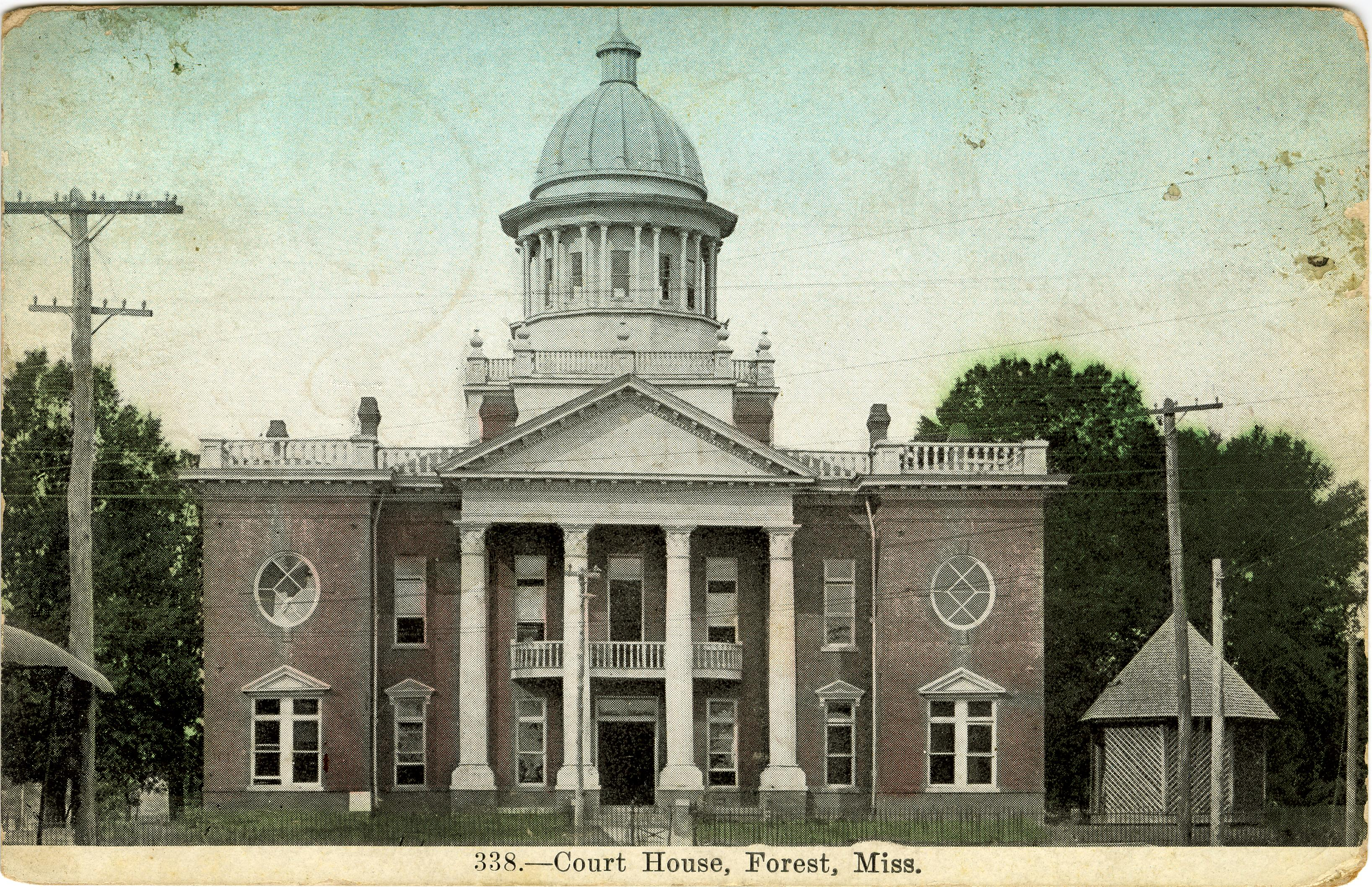
- 1900 Scott County Courthouse (replaced 1924 and again in 1955)

- Location within the U.S. state of Mississippi
- Coordinates: 32°24′N 89°33′W
- Country: United States
- State: Mississippi
- Founded: 1833
- Named for: Abram M. Scott
- Seat: Forest
- Largest city: Forest

Area
  - Total: 610 sq mi (1,600 km^{2})
  - Land: 609 sq mi (1,580 km^{2})
  - Water: 1.2 sq mi (3.1 km^{2}) 0.2%

Population (2020)
  - Total: 27,990
  - Estimate (2025): 28,073 ▲
  - Density: 46.0/sq mi (17.7/km^{2})
- Time zone: UTC−6 (Central)
  - Summer (DST): UTC−5 (CDT)
- Congressional district: 3rd
- Website: scottcountyms.gov

Scott County is a county located in the U.S. state of Mississippi. As of the 2020 census, the population was 27,990. Its county seat is Forest. The county is named for Abram M. Scott, the Governor of Mississippi from 1832 to 1833.

Scott County is part of the Jackson, Mississippi metropolitan area.

== Geography ==
According to the U.S. Census Bureau, the county has a total area of 610 square miles (1,600 km^{2}), of which 609 square miles (1,580 km^{2}) is land and 1.2 square miles (3.1 km^{2}) (0.2%) is water.

It is an approximately 45 minute driving distance from Jackson.

=== Major highways ===
- Interstate 20
- U.S. Highway 80
- Mississippi Highway 13
- Mississippi Highway 21
- Mississippi Highway 35

=== Adjacent counties ===
- Leake County (north)
- Newton County (east)
- Smith County (south)
- Rankin County (west)
- Madison County (northwest)

=== National protected area ===
- Bienville National Forest (part)

== History ==
This area was developed by European Americans for cotton plantations. After the American Civil War, many freedmen worked as sharecroppers or tenant farmers on the plantations. In 1890 the state legislature disenfranchised most blacks, who were a majority in the state, by creating barriers to voter registration; it also passed Jim Crow laws, treating freedmen and their descendants as second-class citizens.

From 1877 to 1950, there were nine lynchings of blacks in Scott County. It was a form of racial terrorism that was at its height at the turn of the 20th century.

On October 23–25, 1898, a "race war" erupted in Harperville, an unincorporated community in Scott County, after blacks resisted one of their community being arrested for an alleged conflict with his white employer. They fatally shot a white deputy and wounded three others. A mob of whites gathered that night and started hunting down and killing black suspects, killing nine to eleven black men by the end of the following day. Sources vary in the count of fatalities, and some blacks were buried before being identified or counted. The county sheriff arrested some black suspects and took them first to the county seat at Forest, and then to Meridian for their safety. Associated Press and major newspapers covered the events.

== Demographics ==
Historical population
Census	Pop.	Note	%±
1840	1,653		—
1850	3,961		139.6%
1860	8,139		105.5%
1870	7,847		−3.6%
1880	10,845		38.2%
1890	11,740		8.3%
1900	14,316		21.9%
1910	16,723		16.8%
1920	16,420		−1.8%
1930	20,914		27.4%
1940	23,144		10.7%
1950	21,681		−6.3%
1960	21,187		−2.3%
1970	21,369		0.9%
1980	24,556		14.9%
1990	24,137		−1.7%
2000	28,423		17.8%
2010	28,264		−0.6%
2020	27,990		−1.0%
2025 (est.)	28,073	▲	0.3%
U.S. Decennial Census; 1790-1960 1900-1990; 1990-2000 2010-2013

=== Racial and ethnic composition ===
Scott County, Mississippi – Racial and ethnic composition Note: the US Census treats Hispanic/Latino as an ethnic category. This table excludes Latinos from the racial categories and assigns them to a separate category. Hispanics/Latinos may be of any race.
Race / Ethnicity (NH = Non-Hispanic)	Pop 1980	Pop 1990	Pop 2000	Pop 2010	Pop 2020	% 1980	% 1990	% 2000	% 2010	% 2020
White alone (NH)	15,715	14,767	15,546	14,353	13,145	64.00%	61.18%	54.70%	50.78%	46.96%
Black or African American alone (NH)	8,508	9,149	10,944	10,502	9,923	34.65%	37.90%	38.50%	37.16%	35.45%
Native American or Alaska Native alone (NH)	59	56	79	66	95	0.24%	0.23%	0.28%	0.23%	0.34%
Asian alone (NH)	16	23	42	50	103	0.07%	0.10%	0.15%	0.18%	0.37%
Native Hawaiian or Pacific Islander alone (NH)	x	x	4	30	0	x	x	0.01%	0.11%	0.00%
Other race alone (NH)	1	1	10	14	52	0.00%	0.00%	0.04%	0.05%	0.19%
Mixed race or Multiracial (NH)	x	x	138	236	524	x	x	0.49%	0.83%	1.87%
Hispanic or Latino (any race)	257	141	1,660	3,013	4,148	1.05%	0.58%	5.84%	10.66%	14.82%
Total	24,556	24,137	28,423	28,264	27,990	100.00%	100.00%	100.00%	100.00%	100.00%

=== 2020 census ===
As of the 2020 census, the county had a population of 27,990. The median age was 36.6 years. 27.5% of residents were under the age of 18 and 15.1% of residents were 65 years of age or older. For every 100 females there were 94.6 males, and for every 100 females age 18 and over there were 89.6 males age 18 and over.

The racial makeup of the county was 48.1% White, 35.8% Black or African American, 0.9% American Indian and Alaska Native, 0.4% Asian, <0.1% Native Hawaiian and Pacific Islander, 10.8% from some other race, and 4.1% from two or more races. Hispanic or Latino residents of any race comprised 14.8% of the population.

<0.1% of residents lived in urban areas, while 100.0% lived in rural areas.

There were 10,235 households in the county, of which 36.3% had children under the age of 18 living in them. Of all households, 42.2% were married-couple households, 18.7% were households with a male householder and no spouse or partner present, and 32.9% were households with a female householder and no spouse or partner present. About 25.5% of all households were made up of individuals and 11.1% had someone living alone who was 65 years of age or older.

There were 11,313 housing units, of which 9.5% were vacant. Among occupied housing units, 72.9% were owner-occupied and 27.1% were renter-occupied. The homeowner vacancy rate was 0.8% and the rental vacancy rate was 9.1%.

=== 2010 census ===
As of the 2010 census, there were 28,264 people, 10,248 households, and 7,264 families residing in the county. The population density was 46.4 people per square mile (17.9 people/km^{2}). There were 11,470 housing units at an average density of 18 units per square mile (6.9 units/km^{2}). The racial makeup of the county was 53.3% White, 37.5% Black or African American, 0.31% Native American, 0.2% Asian, 0.2% Pacific Islander, 7.2% from other races, and 1.4% from two or more races. 10.7% of the population were Hispanic or Latino (6.3% Mexican, 1.5% Guatemalan, 0.7% Cuban).

There were 10,183 households, out of which 36.20% had children under the age of 18 living with them, 49.80% were married couples living together, 18.80% had a female householder with no husband present, and 26.00% were non-families. 22.20% of all households were made up of individuals, and 10.00% had someone living alone who was 65 years of age or older. The average household size was 2.76 and the average family size was 3.21.

In the county, the population was spread out, with 28.60% under the age of 18, 9.60% from 18 to 24, 27.90% from 25 to 44, 21.40% from 45 to 64, and 12.40% who were 65 years of age or older. The median age was 34 years. For every 100 females there were 94.40 males. For every 100 females age 18 and over, there were 90.10 males.

The median income for a household in the county was $26,686, and the median income for a family was $31,487. Males had a median income of $26,406 versus $18,459 for females. The per capita income for the county was $14,013. About 16.50% of families and 20.70% of the population were below the poverty line, including 26.80% of those under age 18 and 22.70% of those age 65 or over.

== Government ==
The Scott County Sheriff's office provides the equivalent of County law enforcement for both unincorporated cities as well as incorporated cities within the county. The Scott County Sheriff is the oldest elected position in Scott County. The Scott County Sheriff's Office has 63 employees, both sworn and non-sworn.

It is divided into six divisions; Administration, patrol, criminal investigations, narcotics, communications, and detention. The Sheriff's office operates the County Jail; it provides detention services under contract to the City of Forest Police Department and to the Mississippi Department of Corrections.

=== Class-action suit against court and Sheriff's Office ===
In September 2014 the American Civil Liberties Union (ACLU) and the MacArthur Justice Center filed a federal class-action civil rights suit, Burks v. Scott County, against the County courts and the Scott County Sheriff's Office for violating suspects' rights, under the Sixth and Fourteenth amendments, to 1) defense counsel, 2) a speedy trial, 3) individualized bail determinations; and 4) freedom from excessive pre-trial detention.

The two plaintiffs had each been held for months in detention without access to a public defender before they were indicted or tried on the charges. "... Mr. Burks has spent over three years in the Scott County jail since August 30, 2009, on the three separate charges," the complaint states. "He has only been indicted once, he has never been to trial, and he has never been convicted."

The state does not require the county courts to issue indictments within any set period of time. The county courts call a grand jury only three times a year, so defendants have long waits in between. At the time of indictment, the Scott County judges pick the public defender for each defendant, creating a conflict of interest. The ACLU notes that similar abuses exist in other Mississippi county court systems.

At the time of the suit, Brandon Buskey, a lawyer with the ACLU's Criminal Law Reform Project, said 53 of the 129 inmates in the Scott County Detention Center had not been indicted.

On September 23, 2014, these parties filed a federal class action lawsuit on behalf of several inmates in the Scott County Detention Center who had been detained for lengthy periods without counsel, fair bail arrangements, formal prosecution, or trial. They proposed the creation of three classes of plaintiffs, among persons who were treated similarly by the county courts.

As of November 2015, the case was ongoing. The US District Court dismissed the plaintiff's motion for a declaratory judgment in September 2015. It retained the claim for damages by the two named plaintiffs but dismissed the motions to certify three classes as moot, saying that defendants could bring up the claimed issues above with the county judges before indictment. The plaintiffs were thus denied class status by the court.

United States presidential election results for Scott County, Mississippi
Year	Republican		Democratic		Third party(ies)	
Year	No.	%	No.	%	No.	%
1912	7	0.94%	722	97.30%	13	1.75%
1916	25	2.18%	1,106	96.26%	18	1.57%
1920	64	5.61%	1,055	92.46%	22	1.93%
1924	53	4.01%	1,179	89.18%	90	6.81%
1928	164	7.41%	2,050	92.59%	0	0.00%
1932	17	1.09%	1,537	98.91%	0	0.00%
1936	33	1.55%	2,097	98.40%	1	0.05%
1940	30	1.25%	2,377	98.75%	0	0.00%
1944	60	2.70%	2,165	97.30%	0	0.00%
1948	15	0.59%	170	6.73%	2,341	92.68%
1952	1,123	33.71%	2,208	66.29%	0	0.00%
1956	503	15.86%	2,077	65.50%	591	18.64%
1960	607	17.48%	1,024	29.49%	1,841	53.02%
1964	4,729	95.21%	238	4.79%	0	0.00%
1968	604	8.93%	1,067	15.77%	5,093	75.30%
1972	5,244	79.95%	1,213	18.49%	102	1.56%
1976	3,649	48.86%	3,643	48.78%	176	2.36%
1980	4,645	52.59%	4,043	45.78%	144	1.63%
1984	5,763	63.66%	3,274	36.16%	16	0.18%
1988	5,522	65.06%	2,939	34.63%	27	0.32%
1992	5,268	56.47%	3,349	35.90%	712	7.63%
1996	4,018	52.43%	3,163	41.27%	483	6.30%
2000	5,601	60.84%	3,548	38.54%	57	0.62%
2004	6,395	62.52%	3,802	37.17%	31	0.30%
2008	6,584	56.41%	5,025	43.06%	62	0.53%
2012	6,089	54.36%	5,031	44.91%	82	0.73%
2016	6,122	58.18%	4,268	40.56%	132	1.25%
2020	6,285	58.56%	4,330	40.34%	118	1.10%
2024	6,098	61.65%	3,729	37.70%	64	0.65%

== Media ==
The Scott County Times has served Scott County since 1939. It is a weekly publication owned by Emmerich Newspapers, Inc.

== Communities ==
=== Cities ===
- Forest
- Morton

=== Towns ===
- Lake (partly in Newton County)
- Sebastopol (partly in Leake County)

=== Census-designated places ===
- Harperville
- Hillsboro

=== Other unincorporated communities ===
- Contrell
- Forkville
- Homewood
- Kalem
- Ludlow
- Midway
- Muskegon
- Norris
- Pulaski

== Education ==
There are two school districts: Scott County School District and Forest Municipal School District.

Scott County Agricultural High School operated until 1930.

East Central Community College operates the Forest/Scott County Career-Technical Center in Forest. Scott County went under the aegis of the community college, then known as East Central Community College, in 1930.

== See also ==
- Bienville National Forest
- Dry counties
- Mississippi Snake Grabbers
- National Register of Historic Places listings in Scott County, Mississippi
- Roosevelt State Park
