= Morton, Mississippi =

- City
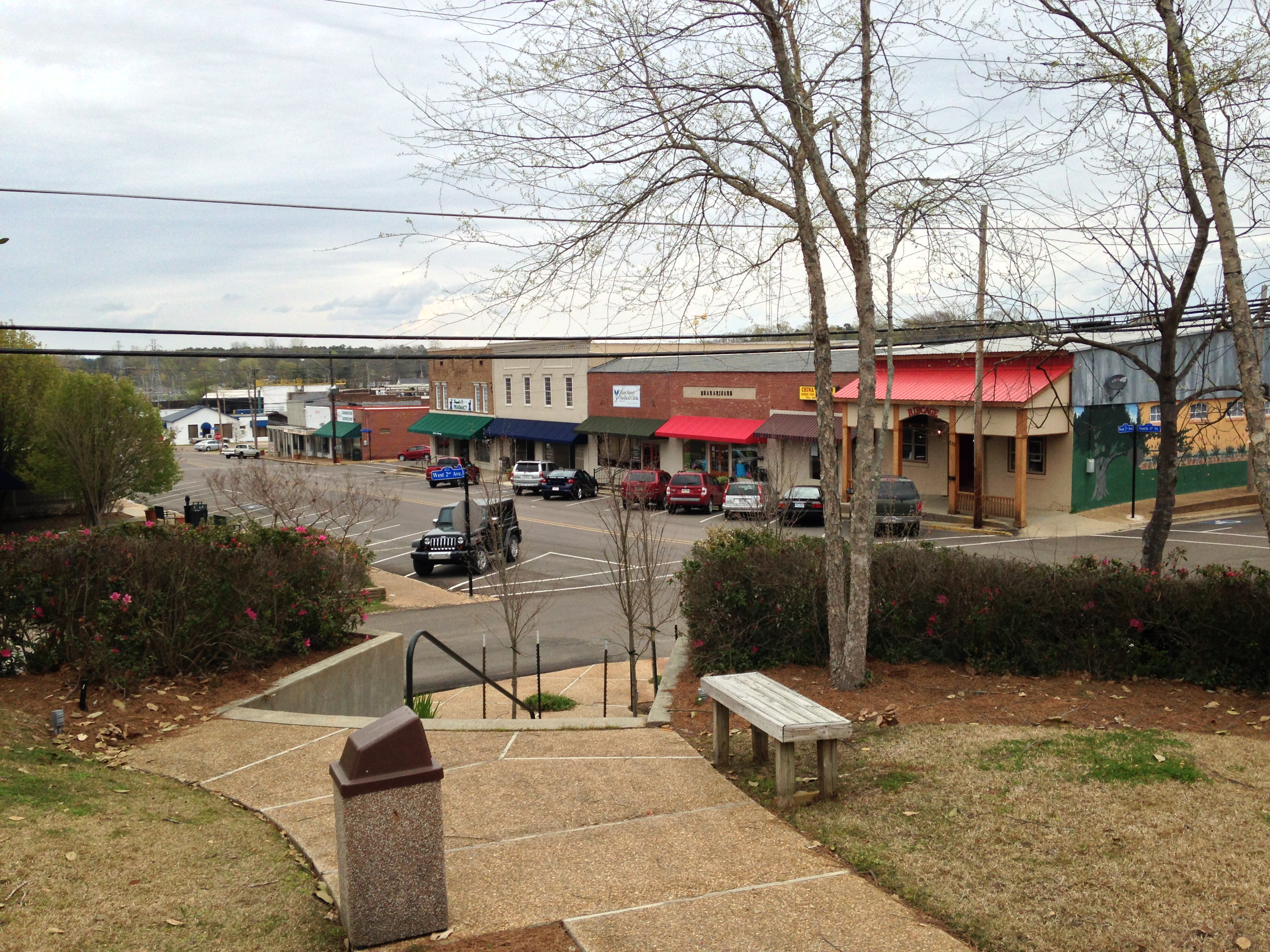
- Downtown Morton, 2013

- Flag

- Location of Morton, Mississippi

- Location in the United States
- Coordinates: 32°20′57″N 89°39′16″W
- Country: United States
- State: Mississippi
- County: Scott

Area
  - Total: 8.92 sq mi (23.11 km^{2})
  - Land: 8.89 sq mi (23.02 km^{2})
  - Water: 0.035 sq mi (0.09 km^{2})
- Elevation: 472 ft (144 m)

Population (2020)
  - Total: 3,711
  - Density: 417.6/sq mi (161.22/km^{2})
- Time zone: UTC-6 (Central (CST))
  - Summer (DST): UTC-5 (CDT)
- ZIP code: 39117
- Area code: 601
- FIPS code: 28-49080
- GNIS feature ID: 0694044
- Website: City website

Morton is a city in Scott County, Mississippi, United States. As of the 2020 census, Morton had a population of 3,711.

== Geography ==
Morton is surrounded by the Bienville National Forest. Roosevelt State Park is southwest of the community.

According to the United States Census Bureau, the city has a total area of 6.8 square miles (18 km^{2}), of which 6.7 square miles (17 km^{2}) are land and 0.04-square-mile (0.10 km^{2}) (0.59%) is water.

== Demographics ==
Historical population
Census	Pop.	Note	%±
1900	200		—
1910	374		87.0%
1920	437		16.8%
1930	955		118.5%
1940	934		−2.2%
1950	1,664		78.2%
1960	2,260		35.8%
1970	2,672		18.2%
1980	3,303		23.6%
1990	3,212		−2.8%
2000	3,482		8.4%
2010	3,462		−0.6%
2020	3,711		7.2%
U.S. Decennial Census

=== Racial and ethnic composition ===
Morton city, Mississippi – Racial and ethnic composition Note: the US Census treats Hispanic/Latino as an ethnic category. This table excludes Latinos from the racial categories and assigns them to a separate category. Hispanics/Latinos may be of any race.
Race / Ethnicity (NH = Non-Hispanic)	Pop 2000	Pop 2010	Pop 2020	% 2000	% 2010	% 2020
White alone (NH)	1,692	1,276	1,063	48.59%	36.86%	28.64%
Black or African American alone (NH)	1,310	1,236	1,167	37.62%	35.70%	31.45%
Native American or Alaska Native alone (NH)	3	9	49	0.09%	0.26%	1.32%
Asian alone (NH)	3	5	4	0.09%	0.14%	0.11%
Native Hawaiian or Pacific Islander alone (NH)	1	1	0	0.03%	0.03%	0.00%
Other race alone (NH)	1	2	8	0.03%	0.06%	0.22%
Mixed race or Multiracial (NH)	18	43	76	0.52%	1.24%	2.05%
Hispanic or Latino (any race)	454	890	1,344	13.04%	25.71%	36.22%
Total	3,482	3,462	3,711	100.00%	100.00%	100.00%

=== 2020 census ===
As of the 2020 census, Morton had a population of 3,711 and 893 families. The median age was 32.7 years. 31.8% of residents were under the age of 18 and 14.2% of residents were 65 years of age or older. For every 100 females there were 91.5 males, and for every 100 females age 18 and over there were 83.9 males age 18 and over.

0.0% of residents lived in urban areas, while 100.0% lived in rural areas.

There were 1,132 households in Morton, of which 46.6% had children under the age of 18 living in them. Of all households, 37.8% were married-couple households, 16.9% were households with a male householder and no spouse or partner present, and 38.1% were households with a female householder and no spouse or partner present. About 21.5% of all households were made up of individuals and 10.5% had someone living alone who was 65 years of age or older.

There were 1,270 housing units, of which 10.9% were vacant. The homeowner vacancy rate was 0.6% and the rental vacancy rate was 11.1%.

Racial composition as of the 2020 census
Race	Number	Percent
White	1,146	30.9%
Black or African American	1,177	31.7%
American Indian and Alaska Native	114	3.1%
Asian	4	0.1%
Native Hawaiian and Other Pacific Islander	1	0.0%
Some other race	1,007	27.1%
Two or more races	262	7.1%

=== 2010 census ===
As of the 2010 census, there were 3,462 people, 1,133 households, and 797 families residing in the city. The population density was 517.9 inhabitants per square mile (200.0/km^{2}). There were 1,289 housing units at an average density of 191.7 per square mile (74.0/km^{2}). The racial makeup of the city was 44.5% White, 35.9% African American, 0.3% Native American, 0.1% Asian, 0.1% Pacific Islander, 16.8% from other races, and 2.2% from two or more races. Hispanic or Latino were 25.7% (16.1% Mexican, 3.3% Guatemalan, 1.4% Cuban, 1.0% Nicaraguan, 0.8% Argentinean).

=== 2000 census ===
There were 1,197 households, out of which 35.1% had children under the age of 18 living with them, 43.3% were married couples living together, 21.5% had a female householder with no husband present, and 28.8% were non-families. 24.5% of all households were made up of individuals, and 10.4% had someone living alone who was 65 years of age or older. The average household size was 2.78 and the average family size was 3.26.

In the city, the population was spread out, with 27.8% under the age of 18, 10.0% from 18 to 24, 26.5% from 25 to 44, 21.2% from 45 to 64, and 14.5% who were 65 years of age or older. The median age was 35 years. For every 100 females, there were 89.3 males. For every 100 females age 18 and over, there were 82.7 males.

The median income for a household in the city was $25,491, and the median income for a family was $31,161. Males had a median income of $26,649 versus $16,731 for females. The per capita income for the city was $12,556. About 18.9% of families and 24.6% of the population were below the poverty line, including 32.5% of those under age 18 and 22.4% of those age 65 or over.

== Economy ==
The main employers are chicken processing plants. The largest poultry plant is owned by Koch Foods Inc.

== Education ==
The City of Morton is served by the Scott County School District.

East Central Community College covers Scott County. It operates the Forest/Scott County Career-Technical Center in Forest.

== Notable people ==
- Rhythm and blues singer B Angie B was born and raised in Morton
- Taveze Calhoun, NFL defensive back
- Atley Donald, MLB pitcher, was born in Morton
- Rita Easterling, former basketball player and coach
- Shay Hodge, former NFL wide receiver
- Daniel Jones, 16th chancellor of the University of Mississippi
- Deuce McAllister, New Orleans Saints running back, attended Morton High School
- Tyler McCaughn, member of the Mississippi State Senate
- Glenn D. Walker, former commander of the 4th Infantry Division, First United States Army, I Corps, and adjutant general of the Mississippi National Guard
- Joe Williams, former college basketball coach
- Woodrow Wilson, Nevada state legislator who was born in Morton
