= Mississippi Department of Wildlife, Fisheries, and Parks =

Agnecy of the government of the State of Mississippi

Agency overview
- Formed: July 3, 1956
- Headquarters: 1505 Eastover Drive Jackson, MS 39211-6374 Phone: (601) 432-2400
- Website: www.mdwfp.com

The Mississippi Department of Wildlife, Fisheries, and Parks (MDWFP), formerly known as the Mississippi Game & Fish Commission, is an agency of the government of the U.S. state of Mississippi responsible for programs protecting Mississippi fish and wildlife resources and their habitats, as well as administering all state parks; it has its headquarters in Jackson.

The agency issues hunting and fishing licenses, advises on habitat protection, and sponsors public education programs. It is also responsible for enforcement of Mississippi's fish and game laws. It is separate from the Mississippi Department of Marine Resources, which is the governing body for the state's natural salt-water resources and law enforcement thereof (i.e. Gulf of Mexico, ocean-going vessels, etc.).

== Leadership ==
The Mississippi Department of Wildlife, Fisheries, and Parks' leadership is made up of five people and is known as the Mississippi Commission on Wildlife, Fisheries, and Parks. The commissioners are appointed by the governor, however the state senate must approve them. They serve for a five-year term. One commissioner is appointed from each of the five congressional districts as they existed prior to 2000.

The five-member commission elects one of them to be chairman and one of them to be vice-chairman. The chairman oversees meetings of the commission and the vice-chairman oversees meetings of the commission when the chairman is absent.

The commission establishes and removes regulations and ordinances as they related to the department. The commission also carries out other duties, responsibilities and powers as they are instructed by government order such as by law or executive order from the Governor.

== Mission ==
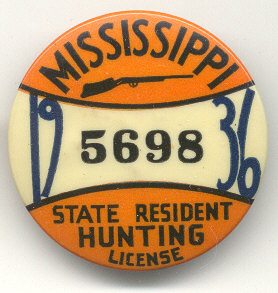
A State of Mississippi hunting license pin from 1936.

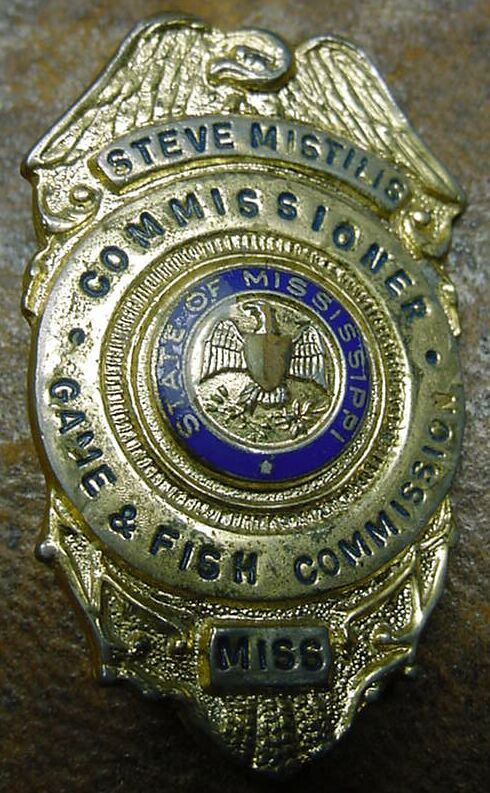
A Mississippi Game & Fish Commission badge from 1964.

The department operates six programs in carrying out its mission:

- The Parks and Recreation Program
- The Freshwater Fisheries Management Program
- The Wildlife Management Program
- The Mississippi Museum of Natural Science Program
- The Law Enforcement Program
- The Support Services Program

== See also ==
- List of law enforcement agencies in Mississippi
- List of state and territorial fish and wildlife management agencies in the United States
