= Alcohol laws of Mississippi =

Since 1886 to present day

The legality of selling alcoholic beverages in Mississippi differs by county. Since 1966, when the statewide prohibition on alcohol was lifted, each of Mississippi's 82 counties has had the power to decide by referendum whether to allow alcohol sales (to become a "wet" county) or to forbid them (remain "dry"). As of August 2025, there are 51 wet counties, 26 counties that are dry except for the county seat and other specific municipalities, three counties where one judicial district is dry and the other is wet, one county that is dry outside of specific businesses exempted by the state legislature (Greene County), and one dry county with no exceptions (Benton County).

Separately, cities and counties may choose whether or not to allow the sale of beer, wine coolers, and other beverages with an alcohol content by weight of less than five percent, which have been legal in the state since 1934. As of August 2025, seven counties allow beer while remaining at least partially dry for liquor, while five counties and two judicial districts maintain the prohibition on beer in some areas while allowing liquor sales.

Up until 2020, counties which forbid the sale of alcoholic beverages also forbid the possession of such beverages. This changed with the passage of House Bill 1087, which made the possession of alcohol legal in every part of the state, regardless of whether alcohol sales were allowed there or not. This law took effect on January 1, 2021.

== History ==
=== Origins and national Prohibition (1886–1933) ===
As of 1880, county-level bans on the sale of alcohol had been enacted in 11 counties in Mississippi. In 1886, the Mississippi state legislature passed a local option law, allowing counties to hold a referendum to decide whether to prohibit the sale of alcohol. By 1890, Mississippi had more dry counties than any state where alcohol was not banned entirely. By the time a statewide ban was considered, 69 of Mississippi's 76 then-existing counties had voted for prohibition.

On December 31, 1908, the state government revoked all liquor licenses in Mississippi, effectively making the sale of alcohol illegal statewide, but not its possession, consumption, manufacture, distribution, or use as medicine. The law was poorly enforced in its first decade, due to the ease of importing alcohol from other states. The state legislature responded by making it a criminal offense to transport liquor over a distance greater than 100 feet, but illegal saloons remained widespread.

When the Eighteenth Amendment to the United States Constitution was introduced, proposing to ban the sale and manufacture of alcohol nationwide, Mississippi became the first state to ratify the amendment on January 7, 1918. The state legislature approved the amendment on the first day of its legislative session and with less than 20 minutes of debate before doing so. The National Prohibition Act took effect on January 17, 1920, one year after the amendment was added to the Constitution.

=== Dry state (1933–1965) ===
Prohibition at the national level ended on December 5, 1933, with the ratification of the Twenty-first Amendment. Mississippi was not one of the 38 states to ratify the amendment, and the previously existing state laws banning alcohol were not affected by the repeal of national Prohibition. However, the Mississippi law lacked enforcement at the state level, so when federal enforcement ended, it was left to county and district officials to prosecute alcohol offenses.

The sale of beer and light wine, then legally defined as having an alcohol content by weight of four percent or less, was made legal in all parts of Mississippi on February 26, 1934. The law provided for counties to hold a referendum once every five years on whether to continue allowing the sale of beer, as well as for a statewide referendum on the question of legalizing hard liquor. If the referendum question had been approved by a majority of Mississippi voters, it would have created a state liquor commission, responsible for state-owned liquor stores located only in those counties where a majority voted "yes". The statewide referendum was held on July 10, 1934, and legal liquor was rejected by a wide margin. Additionally, Jefferson Davis County scheduled its beer referendum on the same date, becoming the first county in Mississippi to re-prohibit beer.

By October 1937, a beer referendum had been held in 45 of Mississippi's 82 counties, with 42 voting to ban it and three choosing to allow its continued sale. The state legislature modified the law in 1950 to allow cities with a population of 2,500 or more to hold a beer referendum separately from the surrounding county. In 1956, the possession of any quantity of beer in counties where it could not be sold was banned. At that time, 53 counties had voted to outlaw beer (with the exception of two cities inside those counties that had re-legalized it), while 29 counties continued to allow it.

Beginning on April 1, 1944, Mississippi House Bill 892 levied a 10 percent tax on "any tangible property, articles or commodities whatsoever, the sale or distribution of which is prohibited by law". Commonly known as the "black market tax" or "bootleg tax", this law was understood at the time to refer primarily to the sale of liquor. The National Tax Association observed that it was "unique in the annals of American state taxation" and that "except as a form of legal blackmail, it is difficult to see how such a tax can be effectively administered". However, in its first month, the tax collected revenues of $29,111 (equivalent to $532,418 in 2025) from an estimated 1,000 illegal liquor dealers and sellers of other illegal goods.

The responsibility of collecting the black market tax receipts belonged to the Mississippi State Tax Collector's office, and the State Tax Collector and their staff were paid on commission, being given 10 percent of the proceeds for their work. After William F. Winter was appointed as collector in 1956, the state grew more efficient in levying the tax. Winter's office paid the state of Louisiana for the names of Mississippi residents who legally purchased liquor in Louisiana, then visited those persons to demand a payment of $4.20 (equivalent to $50 in 2025) for each case of liquor. With the help of Winter's renewed enforcement, the state collected liquor taxes of $1.3 million in 1958 (equivalent to $11 million in 2025). Winter personally received as much as $81,000 per year in commissions (equivalent to $882,000 in 2025), making him the second-highest-paid public official in the United States, behind only the President's $100,000 salary.

Another referendum on the legalization of alcohol was held on August 26, 1952. The majority again voted against liquor, although by a smaller margin than in 1934. Legalization received majority support in 15 of Mississippi's 82 counties, according to preliminary returns. The state legislature again considered a local option system in 1960, but the bill lost momentum after the high-profile fatal shooting of Marion County sheriff J. V. Polk, believed to have been committed by liquor bootleggers. A two-question referendum was authorized by the state legislature in 1964, which would have asked voters first whether prohibition should be repealed, and then whether liquor stores should be state-owned or privately-owned if repeal was successful. Governor Paul B. Johnson Jr. vetoed the bill, taking issue with the provision that only those who voted for repeal could vote on the second question.

=== Repeal (1966) ===
On February 2, 1966, Governor Johnson spoke before the Mississippi Legislature, recommending a referendum that would end the state's confusing and poorly enforced system of prohibition. The referendum, at first scheduled for March 15, would give residents the choice between legalizing the sale of alcohol or fully enforcing a continued ban. This was the first time that a Mississippi governor had taken such a position since statewide prohibition was introduced in 1909.

Johnson's proposal became more urgent on the night of February 4, when a high-profile liquor raid was carried out by Hinds County deputy sheriff Tom Shelton at the Jackson Country Club. Since being granted the power to enforce the law by Sheriff Fred Pickett in 1965, Shelton had become one of the state's few strict enforcers of the liquor law. At first, this enforcement applied mostly to roadhouses in the rural part of the county with predominantly black customers, but Shelton grew determined to enforce the law against the wealthy white citizens of the state capital as well. The Country Club raid, seizing bottles of champagne and breaking up a reception attended by Governor Johnson, William Winter, and many other prominent Mississippians, drew even greater attention to the poor enforcement of the laws in the rest of the state.

The club's assistant manager, Charles Wood, was arrested in the raid. In the ensuing case of The State of Mississippi v. Charles Wood, Wood's lawyers argued that the "black market tax" on liquor contradicted the state's ostensible ban on alcohol, and that the widespread existence of establishments openly selling liquor showed that the state already tolerated it. The court called on district attorneys and other officials from across the state, who testified that it had become almost impossible to convict liquor traffickers because of jury nullification. Judge Charles Barber agreed with the argument, noting that state law allowed liquor sellers to apply to the tax commission for licenses, showing that the state was knowingly approving of certain alcohol sales. Wood was acquitted of all charges.

The same legal argument was introduced in a case before the Mississippi Supreme Court in May. If the court was to strike down the state's liquor law, then alcohol would be made legal in Mississippi without any restrictions or regulations whatsoever. The state legislature rushed to pass a modified version of Governor Johnson's proposal, removing the statewide referendum and replacing it with a local option referendum to be organized in each of Mississippi's 82 counties. The bill was sent to the governor on May 16, three days before the state supreme court case was scheduled to begin. However, Johnson neither signed nor vetoed the measure at first, indecisive and unhappy with the idea that some counties could legalize alcohol even if the majority of Mississippians opposed it statewide. Johnson eventually signed the bill on May 21, less than ten hours before it would have automatically become law without his signature. The state supreme court ultimately was not persuaded by the argument, overturning Wood's acquittal in June, but by then the local option law was already being implemented.

== County legal option laws (1966–present) ==
The passage of the Local Option Alcoholic Beverage Control Law made Mississippi into an alcoholic beverage control state, like its neighbor Alabama. The law took effect on July 1, 1966, with the Mississippi Office of Alcoholic Beverage Control being created. The ABC was given power over all distribution of alcohol in the state, with permitted sellers required to get their supplies from the state. Many retailers that had previously ignored the law stopped selling alcohol, in anticipation of receiving their new legal permit. The state therefore became, in the words of Governor Johnson, "drier than the Sahara Desert", but only for the short time before each county could hold its referendum.

The first counties to hold a local option vote were Harrison (home of prominent but technically illegal nightclubs in Biloxi) and Washington, both of which did so on July 16. In both counties, the option passed with an overwhelming majority of the vote. The Broadwater Beach Hotel in Biloxi received the state's first permit for legal liquor sales on July 22, and it sold Mississippi's first legal alcoholic drink in decades on July 27, to hotel manager T. M. Dorsett. The state's first liquor store, The Jigger & Jug, opened in Greenville on August 3.

In the 10 Mississippi counties that are split into two judicial districts, each one with its own county seat, the districts were allowed to vote on the issue separately. The largest referendum took place on August 2, with 21 counties and two districts voting, 19 of which legalized alcohol and the remaining four of which chose to keep the ban in place. By the end of October 1966, 38 counties and four districts had voted to legalize alcohol, 24 counties and three districts had chosen to remain dry, and 16 counties and one district had not held any referendum yet. The newly wet counties included almost all of the Mississippi Delta, where legalization was favored by the predominantly black population, in one of the first democratic elections in which most were allowed to participate after the passage of the Voting Rights Act of 1965. The ABC reported that it had issued 513 permits as of October 31, mostly to package stores, and had raised $3.47 million (equivalent to $26 million in 2025) in state revenue.

Some counties in Mississippi faced challenges in attempting to hold a democratic referendum on the issue of alcohol. In Lincoln County, the referendum was held on August 2, 1966. The dry cause narrowly prevailed there, with 2,990 votes against the sale of liquor and 2,858 in favor. Local attorneys protested the election results, alleging that the county failed to follow proper procedures in administering the referendum. According to the complaint, ballots were numbered by officials, and ballot boxes were opened before polls closed at 6 p.m. Some precincts allegedly had no voting booths, requiring voters to mark their ballots on the same table where the officials worked. One polling place was apparently unexpectedly moved into a private house, and some election officials were allegedly replaced by unauthorized persons. While the protesting attorneys sought for the state to order a new election at the time, Lincoln County remains dry as of 2025.

After the initial wave of county votes in 1966, the state map of wet and dry counties remained relatively stable for decades. The local option law allowed counties to vote on the issue as many times as local officials chose, but only if more than two years had passed since the county's last referendum. During the 1968 general election, Pike County voted to legalize alcohol after having rejected it in 1966, while Smith County banned alcohol again after previously legalizing it. Between 1969 and 1972, two more counties voted wet and two others that had been wet went back to being dry, while 12 counties and the Bay Springs district of Jasper County still had never held a vote on the issue as of 1972.

Under the 1966 law, the minimum age to possess and drink liquor or wine was 21, while the minimum age for beer remained at 18, as it had been since 1934. The beer age was raised to 21 on October 1, 1986, in keeping with the National Minimum Drinking Age Act, which on that same date introduced penalties in federal highway funding for any state with a minimum alcohol age under 21.

=== Exemptions to dry county laws ===
While the 1966 law created a sharp distinction between wet and dry counties, the state legislature has loosened restrictions over time. In 1976, liquor sales were legalized at Jackson Municipal Airport (now Jackson–Medgar Wiley Evers International Airport), located in dry Rankin County but part of the otherwise wet city of Jackson, the rest of which is located in Hinds County.

In April 1990, a law was passed to allow cities with a population over 6,000 to hold a liquor referendum separately from the dry county surrounding them. Aberdeen became the first city to legalize alcohol this way in November. The small portion of Hattiesburg extending into dry Lamar County (the rest being in wet Forrest County) followed suit in 1992 despite legal challenges from Lamar County, as the city was aiming to attract a convention center project whose developer would only build if alcohol could be served. The same year, the Mississippi Band of Choctaw Indians, whose tribal lands were not subject to the laws of surrounding Neshoba County, had its right to sell alcohol affirmed in a compact with Mississippi governor Kirk Fordice in December 1992, in preparation for the establishment of Pearl River Resort. However, other cities specifically granted the ability to hold a referendum without county approval, including Amory and Brookhaven, did not do so.

The 1966 law also gave the state legislature the power to create Qualified Resort Areas, allowing them to sell alcoholic beverages without the approval of the county or a local referendum. This status was at first only used for unincorporated areas of wet counties. The 1990 law expanded this to include certain state parks. During debate over the bill in March 1990, it was proposed that these would include J. P. Coleman State Park in otherwise dry Tishomingo County. This was intended to attract out-of-state employees to work at the nearby planned Yellow Creek facility, which ultimately was never built. The 1990 law, as passed, did not include Coleman State Park, and the resort status was initially given only to four parks in already wet counties.

The definition of resort status was expanded again in 2004, allowing any golf course in the state with an area of 750 acres or more and being associated with a residential development of at least 400 units to apply for resort status and sell alcohol on the premises. This change was intended to apply exclusively to the Canebrake Country Club in dry Lamar County. However, Castlewoods Country Club in Rankin County also met these requirements and successfully applied for resort status in December 2008. As of 2025, an additional 90 provisions have been added to the state law defining a Qualified Resort Area, most of them applicable only to one specific business, but carefully phrased as general rules about what qualifies an area to avoid creating private bills.

In April 2009, the definition of a resort area was further expanded to allow two specific cities within dry counties to hold a referendum to legalize alcohol within municipal limits. Flowood's referendum later that year and Picayune's in 2010 were both successful.

Legislation passed in 2012 lowered the population threshold for a city holding its own referendum separate from its county from 6,000 to 5,000, and extended the power to all county seats regardless of population. The first city to hold a referendum under this law was Corinth, which voted to legalize alcohol on December 11, 2012. Ashland voted the following week to remain dry. Seven cities voted to become wet in 2013, marking the largest change in Mississippi liquor laws since 1966.

As of August 2025, Benton is the only county in Mississippi where the sale of alcoholic beverages remains entirely illegal, with no exceptions for specific towns or businesses where it is allowed.

=== Legalization of alcohol sales by county (1966–present) ===
County	Referendum	First legal sales	Sources
Adams	August 2, 1966		
Alcorn (except Corinth)	Sale of alcohol remains illegal (Note: Alcorn County voted to allow the sale of alcohol on August 28, 1968, but a later referendum on June 20, 1989, prohibited it again.) (Note: The sale of alcohol is legally permitted at certain businesses in Alcorn County outside of Corinth that have been designated as a Qualified Resort Area by the state legislature. The exemption was signed into law on July 8, 2020, and took effect immediately.)		
Alcorn (Corinth only)	December 11, 2012		
Amite	November 6, 1979 (Note: A previous referendum held on August 7, 1979, approved the sale of alcoholic beverages in Amite County, but its results were voided because the necessary number of signatures were not collected to put the issue on the ballot.)		
Attala (except Kosciusko)	Sale of alcohol remains illegal		
Attala (Kosciusko only)	June 9, 2015	September 4, 2015	
Benton	Sale of alcohol remains illegal		
Bolivar	July 26, 1966		
Calhoun (except Calhoun City and Pittsboro)	Sale of alcohol remains illegal		
Calhoun (Calhoun City only)	September 6, 2024 (Note: The sale of alcohol was legalized by a decision of the city council, not by a public referendum.)		
Calhoun (Pittsboro only)	December 3, 2014		
Carroll	August 30, 1966		
Chickasaw (1st district, except Houston and Woodland)	Sale of alcohol remains illegal		
Chickasaw (Houston only)	July 9, 2019	August 31, 2019	
Chickasaw (Woodland only)	July 26, 2023 (Note: The sale of alcohol was legalized when the town was granted Qualified Resort Area status by the state legislature and/or the Mississippi Department of Revenue, not by a public referendum.)		
Chickasaw (2nd district, Okolona)	July 26, 1966		
Choctaw (except Mathiston)	Sale of alcohol remains illegal		
Choctaw (Mathiston only)	May 29, 2025	July 1, 2025	
Claiborne	August 2, 1966		
Clarke	November 7, 2017		
Clay	September 3, 1966		
Coahoma	August 2, 1966		
Copiah	August 2, 1966		
Covington (except Collins)	Sale of alcohol remains illegal (Note: The sale of alcohol is legally permitted at two establishments in Mount Olive that have been designated as Qualified Resort Areas by the state legislature. The exemption took effect on July 1, 2026.)		
Covington (Collins only)	October 30, 2018		
DeSoto	October 15, 1966		
Forrest	August 2, 1966	August 23, 1966	
Franklin (except Bude)	Sale of alcohol remains illegal		
Franklin (Bude only)	July 1, 2022		
George (except Lucedale)	Sale of alcohol remains illegal		
George (Lucedale only)	April 22, 2025		
Greene	Sale of alcohol remains illegal (Note: Greene County voted to allow the sale of alcohol on October 3, 1966, but a later referendum on November 7, 1972, prohibited it again.) (Note: The sale of alcohol is legally permitted at the Wild Country Roadhouse, Chickasawhay River Canoe/RV Rentals, and Chickasawaves Waterpark, three businesses located just east of Leakesville, which were designated as Qualified Resort Areas by the state legislature effective July 1, 2023.)		
Grenada	August 2, 1983		
Hancock	July 23, 1966	August 10, 1966	
Harrison	July 16, 1966	July 27, 1966	
Hinds (1st district, Jackson)	August 2, 1966	August 10, 1966	
Hinds (2nd district, Raymond)	Sale of alcohol remains illegal (Note: The sale of alcohol is legally permitted at certain businesses in Bolton and Raymond that have been designated as Qualified Resort Areas by the state legislature. The first of these exemptions, covering three blocks in downtown Raymond, was signed into law on July 8, 2020, and took effect immediately. Several others were added effective July 1, 2023.)		
Holmes	August 2, 1966		
Humphreys	August 2, 1966		
Issaquena	July 26, 1966		
Itawamba (except Fulton)	Sale of alcohol remains illegal		
Itawamba (Fulton only)	October 28, 2014		
Jackson	July 29, 1966		
Jasper (1st district, Paulding)	November 8, 1966		
Jasper (2nd district, Bay Springs)	August 6, 2019		
Jefferson	August 16, 1966		
Jefferson Davis	November 4, 1980		
Jones (1st district, Ellisville)	Sale of alcohol remains illegal		
Jones (2nd district, Laurel)	August 2, 1966		
Kemper	Unknown (Note: Kemper County voted to remain dry when a referendum was first held on November 8, 1966. The county had legalized the sale of alcohol by January 1995.)		
Lafayette	August 13, 1966		
Lamar (except Hattiesburg)	Sale of alcohol remains illegal (Note: The sale of alcohol is legally permitted at certain businesses in Lamar County outside of Hattiesburg that have been designated as Qualified Resort Areas by the state legislature. The first of these exemptions, covering the clubhouse of Canebrake Country Club, took effect on July 1, 2004.)		
Lamar (Hattiesburg only)	November 3, 1992		
Lauderdale	August 2, 1966		
Lawrence (except Monticello)	Sale of alcohol remains illegal		
Lawrence (Monticello only)	November 7, 2017		
Lawrence (except Carthage)	Sale of alcohol remains illegal		
Lawrence (Carthage only)	2020		
Lee	August 16, 1966		
Leflore	August 2, 1966		
Lincoln (except Brookhaven)	Sale of alcohol remains illegal (Note: The sale of alcohol is legally permitted at certain businesses in Lincoln County outside of Brookhaven that have been designated as Qualified Resort Areas by the state legislature. The first of these exemptions, covering a golf course clubhouse, took effect on July 1, 2018.)		
Lincoln (Brookhaven only)	June 4, 2013		
Lowndes	August 2, 1966		
Madison	August 2, 1966		
Marion	August 24, 1971		
Marshall	August 6, 1966		
Monroe (except Aberdeen and Amory)	Sale of alcohol remains illegal		
Monroe (Aberdeen only)	November 13, 1990		
Monroe (Amory only)	December 10, 2019	February 7, 2020	
Montgomery	November 2, 1982		
Neshoba (except Philadelphia)	Sale of alcohol remains illegal (Note: The Mississippi Band of Choctaw Indians, which is not subject to county laws, signed a compact with Mississippi governor Kirk Fordice in December 1992, permitting the sale of alcohol on tribal lands as well as gambling, in preparation for the establishment of Pearl River Resort in Neshoba County.)		
Neshoba (Philadelphia only)	June 4, 2013		
Newton (except Decatur, Hickory, and Newton city)	Sale of alcohol remains illegal		
Newton (Decatur only)	July 6, 2021		
Newton (Hickory only)	June 3, 2025		
Newton (Newton city only)	August 30, 2022		
Noxubee	November 2, 1982		
Oktibbeha	November 2, 1971		
Panola (1st district, Sardis)	August 2, 1966		
Panola (2nd district, Batesville)	August 6, 1966		
Pearl River (except Picayune and Poplarville)	November 3, 2026		
Pearl River (Picayune only)	November 9, 2010	May 18, 2011	
Pearl River (Poplarville only)	April 10, 2025	July 1, 2025	
Perry	August 20, 1966		
Pike	November 5, 1968		
Pontotoc (except Ecru, Pontotoc city, and Sherman)	Sale of alcohol remains illegal (Note: The sale of alcohol is legally permitted at one event venue in unincorporated Pontotoc County that has been designated as a Qualified Resort Area by the state legislature. The exemption took effect on July 1, 2022.)		
Pontotoc (Ecru only)	2024		
Pontotoc (Pontotoc city only)	September 16, 2014	December 3, 2014	
Pontotoc (Sherman only)	2025		
Prentiss (except Booneville)	Sale of alcohol remains illegal		
Prentiss (Booneville only)	October 15, 2019		
Quitman	September 2, 1966		
Rankin (except Brandon, Florence, Flowood, Pearl, Richland, and Pearl River Valley Water Supply District lands)	Sale of alcohol remains illegal (Note: Jackson Municipal Airport (now Jackson–Medgar Wiley Evers International Airport), the only part of the city of Jackson which extends into Rankin County, applied for a liquor license in 1966, on the grounds that sales had been legalized in the rest of the city. The Mississippi Supreme Court ruled in January 1968 that the airport could not sell alcohol. The state legislature later passed a law, taking effect on March 10, 1976, which places the airport under the ordinances of Jackson rather than of Rankin County, thereby allowing the sale of alcoholic beverages there.) (Note: The sale of alcohol is legally permitted at certain businesses in unincorporated Rankin County that have been designated as Qualified Resort Areas by the state legislature. The first of these, Castlewoods Country Club, took advantage of a designation intended for another golf course in Lamar County to begin selling alcohol in December 2008.)		
Rankin (Brandon only)	August 20, 2013		
Rankin (Florence only)	2020		
Rankin (Flowood only)	June 2, 2009		
Rankin (Pearl only)	June 3, 2025		
Rankin (Richland only)	2023		
Rankin (Pearl River Valley Water Supply District lands only)	September 23, 2014		
Scott (except Forest)	Sale of alcohol remains illegal		
Scott (Forest only)	June 3, 2025		
Sharkey	August 2, 1966		
Simpson	November 5, 2019 (Note: Simpson County voted to allow the sale of alcohol on August 20, 1966, but a later referendum on November 1, 1969, prohibited it again.)		
Smith (except Raleigh)	Sale of alcohol remains illegal (Note: Smith County voted to allow the sale of alcohol on August 20, 1966, but a later referendum on November 5, 1968, prohibited it again.)		
Smith (Raleigh only)	April 10, 2018		
Stone	November 3, 2015		
Sunflower	August 2, 1966		
Tallahatchie	August 2, 1966		
Tate (except Senatobia)	Sale of alcohol remains illegal (Note: The sale of alcohol is legally permitted in a section of downtown Coldwater, which has been designated as a Qualified Resort Area by the state legislature. The exemption took effect on July 1, 2022.)		
Tate (Senatobia only)	January 29, 2013		
Tippah (except Ripley)	Sale of alcohol remains illegal (Note: The sale of alcohol is legally permitted at the Mississippi Flea Market just outside Ripley, which has been designated as a Qualified Resort Area by the state legislature. The exemption was signed into law on July 8, 2020, and took effect immediately.)		
Tippah (Ripley only)	August 13, 2013		
Tishomingo	May 21, 2013 (Note: A proposed development on Bay Springs Lake in Tishomingo County was designated as a Qualified Resort Area by the state legislature in 2009, but it was never built and its exemption could not be used.)		
Tunica	July 27, 1966		
Union (except New Albany and Sherman)	Sale of alcohol remains illegal (Note: The sale of alcohol is legally permitted at certain businesses in unincorporated Union County that have been designated as Qualified Resort Areas by the state legislature. The first of these exemptions took effect on July 1, 2021.)		
Union (New Albany only)	March 19, 2013		
Union (Sherman only)	2025		
Walthall	November 3, 2020		
Warren	August 2, 1966	August 12, 1966	
Washington	July 16, 1966	August 3, 1966	
Wayne (except Waynesboro)	Sale of alcohol remains illegal (Note: Wayne County voted to allow the sale of alcohol on November 8, 1966, but a later referendum on November 8, 1983, prohibited it again.)		
Wayne (Waynesboro only)	July 23, 2013		
Webster (except Eupora, Mathiston, and Walthall)	Sale of alcohol remains illegal (Note: The sale of alcohol is legally permitted at a golf course clubhouse in unincorporated Webster County that has been designated as a Qualified Resort Area by the state legislature. The exemption took effect on July 1, 2022.)		
Webster (Eupora only)	October 3, 2022		
Webster (Mathiston only)	May 29, 2025	July 1, 2025	
Webster (Walthall only)	2020		
Wilkinson	Unknown (Note: Wilkinson County held a referendum on the sale of alcohol on August 28, 1979, but the outcome is not mentioned in available sources. The county had legalized the sale of alcohol by January 1995.)		
Winston	November 8, 2011		
Yalobusha	August 20, 1966		
Yazoo	August 2, 1966		
