= Jaylen Forbes =

American basketball player (born 2000)

No. 25 – Nelson Giants
- Position: Shooting guard
- League: National Basketball League

Personal information
- Born: December 15, 2000 (age 25)
- Listed height: 6 ft 5 in (1.96 m)
- Listed weight: 185 lb (84 kg)

Career information
- High school: Florence (Florence, Mississippi)
- College: Alabama (2019–2020); Tulane (2020–2024)
- NBA draft: 2024: undrafted
- Playing career: 2025–present

Career history
- 2025–present: Nelson Giants

Career highlights
- 2× Second-team All-AAC (2022–2023); Third-team All-AAC (2021)
Medals
Men's basketball
Representing United States
Summer Universiade
Bronze medal – third place	2021 China	Team

Jaylen Forbes (born December 15, 2000) is an American professional basketball player for the Nelson Giants of the National Basketball League. He played college basketball for the Alabama Crimson Tide and the Tulane Green Wave.

== Early life and high school career ==
Forbes attended Florence High School in Florence, Mississippi. As a junior, he averaged 28.4 points and 12.0 rebounds per game and earned all-state honors. Forbes averaged 23.0 points, 9.1 rebounds and 2.1 assists per game as a senior and earned first team all-state honors by both the Clarion Ledger and USA Today. Regarded as a four-star prospect, he committed to play college basketball at Alabama over offers from UAB and Murray State.

== College career ==
Forbes averaged 2.7 points and 2.1 rebounds per game as a freshman at Alabama. Following the season he transferred to Tulane. On February 26, 2021, Forbes scored a career-high 37 points in a 91-71 loss to Cincinnati. As a sophomore, he averaged 16.4 points and 5.3 rebounds per game. Forbes was named to the Third Team All-American Athletic Conference as well as NABC Division I All-District Second Team. He averaged 15.5 points and 5.4 rebounds per game as a junior and was named to the Second Team All-AAC. As a senior, Forbes averaged 18.5 points and 5.0 rebounds per game en route to Second Team All-AAC honors. Alongside teammate Kevin Cross Jr., he declared for the 2023 NBA draft before withdrawing and returning to Tulane. In his final season, Forbes averaged 14.0 points and 3.8 rebounds per game.

== Professional career ==
On March 2, 2025, Forbes signed with the Nelson Giants of the National Basketball League.

== National team career ==
Forbes was a part of the Tulane team chosen to represent the United States in the 2021 Summer Universiade in China. In the third place game, he scored 27 points in a 102-91 win over Argentina. Forbes averaged 15.7 points and 7.5 rebounds per game, helping the U.S. receive a bronze medal.
