= William E. McIntyre =

American politician

Member of the Mississippi State Senate from the 5th district
- In office January 1944 – January 1948

Member of the Mississippi House of Representatives from the Rankin County district
- In office January 1916 – January 1920

Personal details
- Born: August 16, 1885 Johns, Mississippi
- Died: August 1980 (aged 95)
- Party: Democrat

William Edward McIntyre (August 16, 1885 - August 1980) was a Democratic member of the Mississippi State Legislature in the early-to-mid 20th century.

== Early life ==
William Edward McIntyre was born on August 16, 1885, in Johns, Mississippi. He was the son of M. C. McIntyre and Minervia Jane McIntyre. He attended the public schools of Rankin County, Mississippi. He graduated from the University of Mississippi with a L.L. B. in 1910. He began practicing law in Brandon, Mississippi, in the same year.

== Political career ==
From 1911 to 1912, McIntyre was the County Attorney of Rankin County. He was also on Rankin County's board of supervisors for four years before 1916. In November 1915, he was elected to represent Rankin County as a Democrat in the Mississippi House of Representatives. He served there from 1916 to 1920. While there, he was the chairman of the House's Census and Apportionment committee. He was the member of Mississippi's State Game & Fish Commission starting in 1932, and its chairman for 8 years before 1944. He represented Mississippi's 5th senatorial district in the Mississippi State Senate from 1944 to 1948.

== Personal life and death ==
McIntyre was a Methodist and a member of the Elks, the Masons, and the Knights of Pythias. He died at age 95 in August 1980. His older son, William Edward Jr., died from a throat malignancy about a week later.
