= Anses =

Anses may refer to:

== Organizations ==
- ANSES (Administración Nacional de la Seguridad Social), Argentine social insurance agency
- Agence nationale de sécurité sanitaire de l'alimentation, de l'environnement et du travail, a French governmental agency

== Locations ==
- Canton of Les Anses-d'Arlet, Martinique
- Les Anses-d'Arlet, a town in Martinique
- Anses of Saturn (plural of ansa), an early name for the handle-shaped protuberances on either side of the planet; see Eustachio Divini

Other

- Æsir, Norse gods

== See also ==
- Anse (disambiguation)
- Antes (name)
