= Buddy Alliston =

American football player (1933–2021)

No. 54, 50, 62
- Positions: Guard, linebacker

Personal information
- Born: December 14, 1933; Jackson, Mississippi, U.S.
- Died: October 1, 2021 (aged 87); Cordova, Tennessee, U.S.
- Listed height: 6 ft 0 in (1.83 m)
- Listed weight: 218 lb (99 kg)

Career information
- High school: Florence (Florence, Mississippi)
- College: Ole Miss
- NFL draft: 1956: 15th round, 176th overall pick

Career history
- Winnipeg Blue Bombers (1956, 1959); Oakland Raiders (1960)*; Denver Broncos (1960)
- * Offseason or practice squad member only

Awards and highlights
- Western Interprovincial Football Union All-Star (1956)

Career AFL statistics
- Interceptions: 1
- Stats at Pro Football Reference

Vaughn Samuel "Buddy" Alliston Jr. (December 14, 1933 – October 1, 2021) was an American professional football player who was a guard and linebacker in the Canadian Football League (CFL) and American Football League. He played college football for the Ole Miss Rebels before being selected by the Green Bay Packers of the National Football League (NFL) in the 15th round of the 1956 NFL draft. Alliston first played professionally in the CFL with the Winnipeg Blue Bombers. In 1956, he was the runner-up for the CFL's Most Outstanding Lineman Award. After years of military service, he played in the AFL for the Denver Broncos in 1960.

== Early career ==
Alliston played high school football at Florence High School as a fullback. He also contributed on special teams, blocking 21 punts over the course of his high school career. In 1951, he blocked five punts in a single game.

At the University of Mississippi, Alliston played for the Ole Miss Rebels from 1952 to 1955. As a rookie in 1952, Alliston played as a guard on Ole Miss' rookie "B team". He went on to play as both a left and right guard for the Rebels in the following seasons. In 1954, Alliston became known as a quick player who was able to easily tackle opponents on the defensive side of the ball.

By his senior season, Ole Miss head coach Johnny Vaught considered Alliston to be a contender for All-American honors and the Associated Press expected him to be one of "the best guards of 1955". The Associated Press went on to recognize Alliston several times throughout the season on their "SEC checklist of stars today". At the conclusion of the season, Alliston received a variety of honors, including second-team All-SEC and an honorable mention on the All-American team. He was also selected as an honorable mention for both best offensive and best defensive guard in his conference among a poll of SEC coaches. He was voted "Colonel Rebel" by the Ole Miss student body in December 1955. The Ole Miss Rebels defeated the TCU Horned Frogs 14–13 in the 1956 Cotton Bowl Classic, with Alliston being named the best lineman of the game.

== Professional career ==
The Green Bay Packers of the National Football League selected Alliston in the 15th round of the 1956 NFL draft with the 176th overall pick, but he didn't play for the Packers. Instead, Alliston played for the Winnipeg Blue Bombers of the Canadian Football League in all sixteen regular season games during their 1956 season, recording two interceptions and a fumble recovery. He was named a Western Interprovincial Football Union all-star at the offensive guard position during his rookie season. Alliston was also named a runner-up for the CFL's Most Outstanding Lineman Award.

After his rookie season in the CFL, he took a break from professional football to join the United States Air Force. While with the Air Force, he was a player on the Eglin Air Force Base team which won the 1958 Shrimp Bowl against the Brooke Army Medical Center. Alliston rejoined the Blue Bombers in 1959 but played in only one game. In 1960, Alliston initially joined the Oakland Raiders in their training camp before moving to the Denver Broncos. Alliston played in eleven regular season games for the Broncos as a linebacker. He retired after the 1960 season. Alliston died on October 1, 2021, at the age of 87.
