= Florence High School (Mississippi) =

Coordinates: 32°9′34″N 90°6′37″W

Location
- 232 Highway 469 North; Florence, Rankin County, Mississippi 39073; United States

Information
- Motto: Where Every Eagle Soars / "Eagle PRIDE"
- School district: Rankin County School District
- Superintendent: Scott Rimes
- Principal: Keith Reed
- Teaching staff: 53.61 (FTE)
- Enrollment: 718 (2024-2025)
- Student to teacher ratio: 13.39
- Colors: Black and red
- Mascot: Eagle
- Website: fhs.rcsd.ms

Florence High School is a public high school located in Florence, Mississippi, United States. It serves the city of Florence, the communities of Cleary, King, Monterey, and the surrounding areas to the Pearl River. It is a 5A school in the Mississippi High School Activities Association. It frequently fluctuates between a 4 and 5 rating, making it a successful high school in the Rankin County School District.

== Staff ==
The principal of Florence High School is Keith Reed.

== Extracurricular Activities ==
Athletics at Florence High School include Archery, Baseball, Basketball, Bowling, Cheerleading, Cross Country, Dance, Football, Golf, Powerlifting, Soccer, Softball (Fast-Pitch), Softball (Slow-Pitch), Tennis, Track & Field, Volleyball, and JROTC. The school also has a Band, The Big Red Band, and offers a Student Council and Student Tech Team.

== Notable alumni ==
- Tate Reeves (Class of 1992), Governor of Mississippi and former state treasurer.
