= Pearl High School =

Pearl High Schools may refer to:

- Pearl High School, high school for African Americans that preceded Martin Luther King Magnet at Pearl High School (Nashville, Tennessee), listed on the National Register of Historic Places as Pearl High School
- Pearl-Cohn Comprehensive High School (Nashville, Tennessee)
- Pearl High School (Mississippi) (Pearl, Mississippi)
