= Ray Rogers (politician) =

American politician (1931–2020)

Member of the Mississippi House of Representatives from the 61st district
- In office 1984 – January 7, 2020
- Succeeded by: Gene Newman

Personal details
- Born: Nolan Ray Rogers; July 3, 1931 Pearl, Mississippi
- Died: December 18, 2020 (aged 89) Pearl, Mississippi
- Party: Republican
- Spouse: Shirley Greer
- Occupation: Businessman

Nolan Ray Rogers (July 3, 1931 – December 18, 2020) was an American politician in the state of Mississippi.

Rogers was a native of Pearl, Mississippi, where he attended Pearl High School. During his time there he was the first quarterback in their football program and holds the record for most interceptions. Ray Rogers Stadium at Pearl High School is named after him. He owned an advertising company and was a justice of the peace. Rogers was elected to the Mississippi House of Representatives in 1983 and had served district 61 from 1984 until 2020. A Republican, he served on the Ways and Means, Banking and Financial Services, Investigate State Offices, Management, Military Affairs and PEER committees.

He was married to Shirley Greer and had three children. A member of the Methodist church, he was also a member of his local Kiwanis, Exchange, and football clubs. He died at his home in Pearl, Mississippi in 2020.
