= 1997 Pearl High School shooting =

Mass shooting in Mississippi, US

- Location: 32.2704644°N 90.093745°W; 500 Pirate Cove; Pearl, Mississippi, U.S.
- Date: October 1, 1997; 29 years ago 08:06 a.m. (CST; UTC−06:00)
- Target: Students and staff at Pearl High School
- Attack type: Mass shooting; school shooting; matricide; uxoricide
- Weapons: Marlin Model 336 .30-30-caliber lever-action rifle; Knife and baseball bat (mother's murder)
- Deaths: 3 (including the perpetrator's mother at home)
- Injuries: 7
- Victims: Mary Ann Woodham; Lydia Kaye Dew; Christina Menefee
- Perpetrator: Luke Woodham
- Defender: Joel Myrick
- Motive: Infidelity (ex-girlfriend) (Note: "The second time, this is what pushed me over the edge [...] She'd always flirt with other guys, she'd always do [?] that kind of crap right to my face, she'd always tell me how cute other guys were." "Finally she went on a choral music trip and she flirted with one of the guys there. She let him watch her change and all this kind of crap and they hung all over each other and she came back here and told me all of this [...] and then she dumped me again. And ever since then, I've never been the same."); School bullying; Childhood abuse
- Charges: First-degree murder; Second-degree murder; Third-degree murder; Attempted murder; Assault
- Verdict: Life in prison + 140 years

On October 1, 1997, a mass shooting took place at Pearl High School in Pearl, Mississippi, United States. Two students were killed and seven others were injured before the perpetrator, 16-year-old 11th grade student Luke Woodham, was apprehended by an armed faculty member. The victims included Woodham's ex-girlfriend and prior to the shooting, he had killed his mother by bludgeoning and stabbing at their home.

Woodham was convicted of murder and attempted murder, for which he was sentenced to three terms of life imprisonment and an additional 140 years respectively. Six other students were arrested as potential co-conspirators, but charges were dropped against five of the students, who were minors, while an 18-year-old group member sentenced to six months of boot camp and five years probation.

== Shooting ==
The incident began on the morning of October 1, 1997, when Luke Woodham (born February 5, 1981) fatally stabbed and bludgeoned his mother, 50-year-old Mary Ann Woodham, as she prepared for a morning jog. An autopsy report revealed that she had eleven slash wounds and seven stab wounds, including stab wounds to the heart and lungs. At his trial, Woodham claimed that he could not remember killing his mother.

Woodham then drove his mother's Toyota Tercel to Pearl High School. Wearing a trench coat to conceal the rifle he was carrying, Woodham entered the school and gave a manifesto to Justin Sledge. Sledge, realizing what was about to occur, gathered some friends and hid in the safety of the library while the shooting took place.

During the trial, one former student would testify under oath that "he was in the commons with classmate Justin Sledge when Woodham walked up and spoke to Sledge. Justin Sledge then told him, "no matter what I heard, no matter what I saw, don't turn around. Just keep going forward. I didn't see anything. I just heard gunshots."

Woodham then fatally shot 17-year-old senior Lydia Kaye Dew and 16-year-old fellow junior Christina Michelle Menefee, his former girlfriend. Seven others were injured.

Joel Myrick, a US Army Reserve Major serving as the school's assistant principal, retrieved a.45 caliber M1911 pistol from his truck and, spotting Woodham attempting to flee the parking lot after the shooting, shouted for him to stop. Woodham lost control of his vehicle, and Myrick ordered him out of the car at gunpoint and detained him until police arrived at the scene.

== Religious and esoteric involvement ==
Less than a week after the shooting, police arrested six other students, charging them with conspiracy to commit murder. Justin Sledge had gone on a local news report and read from the notebooks of writings given to him just before the shooting. Minutes before Woodham started the shooting, he had given Sledge a manifesto containing the following:

I am not insane, I am angry. I killed because people like me are mistreated every day. I did this to show society, push us and we will push back. ... All throughout my life, I was ridiculed, always beaten, always hated. Can you, society, truly blame me for what I do? Yes, you will. ... It was not a cry for attention, it was not a cry for help. It was a scream in sheer agony saying that if you can't pry your eyes open, if I can't do it through pacifism, if I can't show you through the displaying of intelligence, then I will do it with a bullet.

The text also referenced The Gay Science by Friedrich Nietzsche. Further examination of the notebooks revealed an account of when Woodham and a friend, Grant Boyette, had tortured his dog Sparkle to death, several months prior to the shooting:

I will never forget the howl she made. It sounded almost human. We laughed and hit her hard.

Prior to the shootings, Woodham had met Boyette, another of the six charged with conspiracy to murder, and supposedly accepted an invitation to join a group Boyette had formed and called "the Kroth". During the summer of 1997, the supposed members of the Kroth allegedly made plans to terrorize Pearl High School. The plans ultimately involved Woodham entering the school and opening fire.

Days after the arrest, an antagonistic note claiming to be written by “The Alliance of the Immortalz“ was pinned to a memorial near the school sign. Justin Sledge denied any involvement in the act as well as any knowledge of, or connection to, “the Kroth” or the “Alliance of the Immortalz.” Regardless, Sledge was widely blamed for the act. Following the shooting, Sledge spoke at a prayer vigil held to mourn the dead students, for which he received a suspension from the school district.

On October 8, 1997, Sledge, Boyette, and the others were arrested on suspicion of conspiring with Woodham to commit the shooting.

Woodham claimed that Boyette had told him he had "potential to do something great," and promised him that he could get his ex-girlfriend back through black magic.

After his conviction Woodham converted to Christianity, and said the following in a letter written to evangelical minister David Wilkerson:

David, I receive your sermons through the mail. I am one of the school shooters. I'm the one they blame for starting it all off. On October 1, 1997, I went into Pearl High School and killed two students and wounded seven. I also killed my mother before this. After I came to jail I got saved. If there is any way that I can help your ministry, I would love to. Maybe I could give you my testimony. I'll do anything to help. I look forward to your sermons each month.

== Trials and incarceration ==
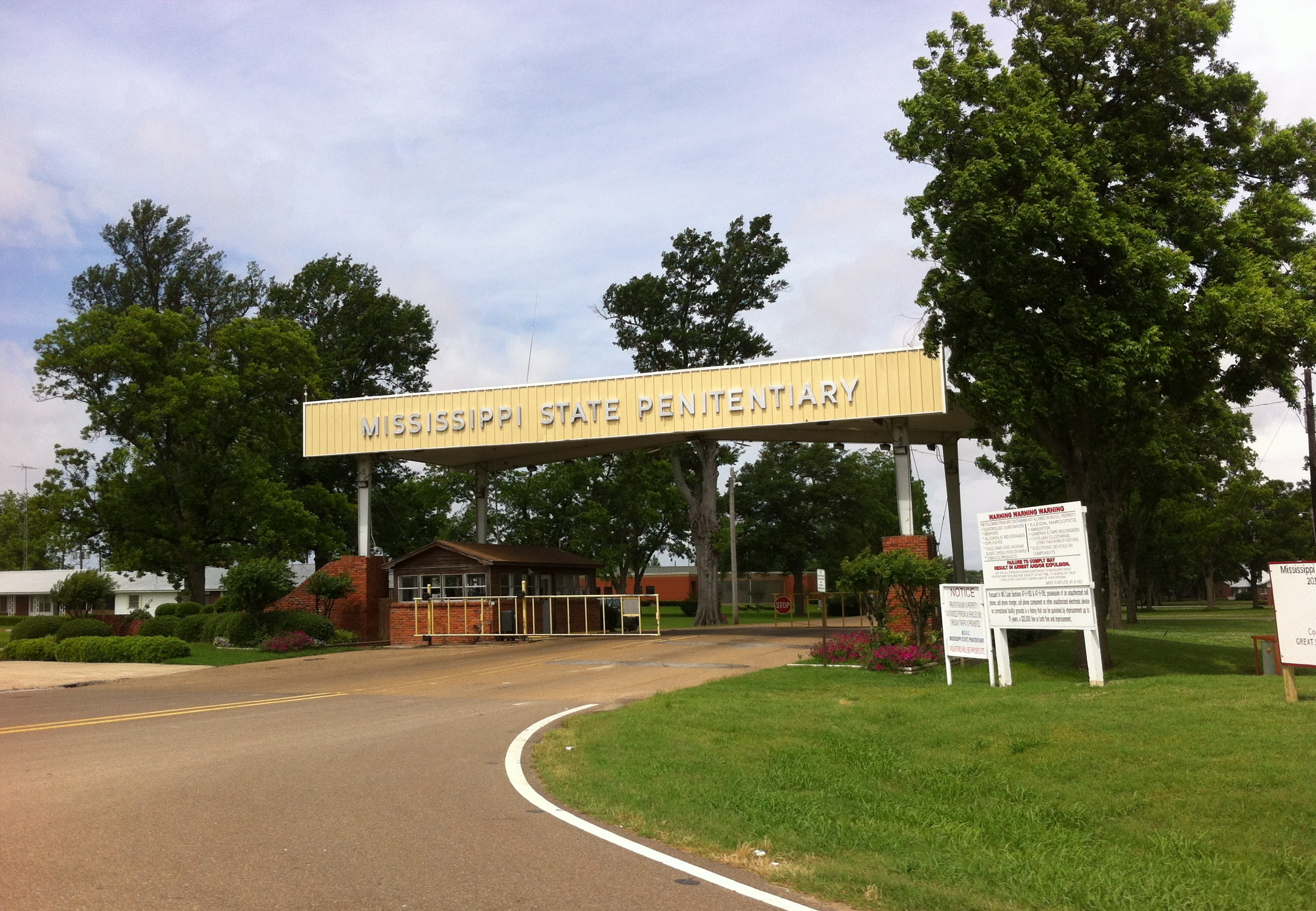
Mississippi State Penitentiary, where Luke Woodham is incarcerated

There were separate trials for the murder of Woodham's mother and the school shooting. Woodham's lawyer argued at both trials that Woodham was insane at the time of the killings. Jurors rejected Woodham's insanity defense at his first trial for the murder of his mother, and he was sentenced to life in prison on June 5, 1998. His second trial took place on June 12, and he was found guilty of two counts of murder and seven counts of attempted murder, with the jurors once again rejecting the insanity defense. He was given two life sentences for the murders and seven 20-year sentences for his attempted murder convictions. He is currently serving three life terms plus an additional 140 years in prison. He will be eligible for parole in 2046, when he is 65 years old.

Conspiracy charges against the members of the Kroth who were minors were dropped by Judge Robert Goza "at the request of District Attorney John Kitchens, who said Mississippi's conspiracy law would make proving the accusations difficult." Grant Boyette, who was 18 at the time, was convicted and sentenced to the Mississippi State Penitentiary at Parchman boot camp for six months and five years of supervised probation.

Less than three days after his last conviction, Woodham was removed from the Forrest County Jail in Hattiesburg. On June 15, 1998, Woodham entered the Mississippi Department of Corrections (MDOC) system in the Central Mississippi Correctional Facility (CMCF) in Rankin County. While at CMCF Woodham underwent evaluation so he could be assigned to a permanent facility. Several weeks later, he was moved into the Mississippi State Penitentiary (MSP) in Sunflower County. In 2010, Woodham made a request to Governor of Mississippi, Haley Barbour, asking for clemency; however, his request was rejected.

As of May 2025, Woodham is incarcerated in Unit 2 of SMCI as MDOC #R4682. His location last changed on May 23, 2025.

== Aftermath ==
As a result of this incident, the state of Mississippi made murder on school property a capital crime.

== See also ==
- List of school shootings in the United States by death toll
- List of school shootings in the United States (before 2000)
- List of school-related attacks
