= Comeby, Mississippi =

- Ghost town
- Location within the state of Mississippi
- Coordinates: 32°04′11″N 90°00′35″W
- Country: United States
- State: Mississippi
- County: Rankin
- Elevation: 400 ft (120 m)
- Time zone: UTC-6 (Central (CST))
  - Summer (DST): UTC-5 (CDT)
- GNIS feature ID: 687023

Comeby is a ghost town in Rankin County, Mississippi, United States.

Comeby was a sawmill town, and was named for the favorite expression of the mill owner, John R. Webster: "come by to see me".

Comeby had a post office from 1903 to 1918, and was a stop on the Illinois Central Railroad.
