= 2024 NBA G League draft =

Basketball league draft

General information
- Sport: Basketball
- Date: October 26, 2024

Overview
- League: NBA
- First selection: Matt Ryan, Westchester Knicks

The 2024 NBA G League draft was the 24th draft of the NBA G League. It was held on October 26, 2024. Matt Ryan was selected by the Westchester Knicks as the first overall pick.

== Key ==
Pos.	G	F	C
Position	Guard	Forward	Center

†	Denotes player who was also selected in an NBA Draft

== Draft ==
=== First round ===
Pick	Player	Pos.	Nationality	Team	College/country
1	Matt Ryan	F	United States	Westchester Knicks	Chattanooga
2	Landry Shamet^{†}	G	United States	Westchester Knicks	Wichita State
3	Sean East II	F	United States	Cleveland Charge	Missouri
4	Thierry Darlan	G	Central African Republic	Rip City Remix	NBA G League Ignite
5	Chandler Hutchison^{†}	F	United States	Long Island Nets	Boise State
6	Christian Brown	F	United States	Sioux Falls Skyforce	Tennessee State
7	Tyson Walker	G	United States	Texas Legends	Michigan State
8	Malik Hall	F	United States	Greensboro Swarm	Michigan State
9	Eric Gaines	G	United States	Maine Celtics	Alabama-Birmingham
10	Tae Williams	G	United States	Salt Lake City Stars	Cleveland State
11	Seth Maxwell	C	United States	Santa Cruz Warriors	Indiana Wesleyan
12	Cameron Martin	F	United States	Motor City Cruise	Boise State
13	Ibrahima Diallo	C	Senegal	Austin Spurs	Central Florida
14	Justin Moore	G	United States	Rio Grande Valley Vipers	Villanova
15	Tylor Perry	G	United States	Raptors 905	Kansas State
16	Kevin Cross Jr.	F	United States	Indiana Mad Ants	Tulane
17	Paul Mulcahy	G	United States	Sioux Falls Skyforce	Washington
18	Brandon Childress	G	United States	Sioux Falls Skyforce	Wake Forest
19	Nate Roberts	C	United States	Valley Suns	Washington
20	Tommy Rutherford	C	United States	Santa Cruz Warriors	California-Irvine
21	London Johnson	G	Jamaica	Maine Celtics	NBA G League Ignite
22	Trae Hannibal	G	United States	Cleveland Charge	Louisiana State
23	Marlain Veal	G	United States	South Bay Lakers	Southeastern Louisiana
24	Bryce Griggs	G	United States	Texas Legends	Overtime Elite
25	Jaylan Gainey	F	United States	Salt Lake City Stars	Florida State
26	Justyn Hamilton	F	United States	Oklahoma City Blue	Kent State
27	Garrett Denbow	G	United States	San Diego Clippers	Anderson
28	Steven Richardson	F	United States	Austin Spurs	Montana State-Billings
29	Lewis Duarte	G	Dominican Republic	Mexico City Capitanes	Overtime Elite
30	–	–	–	Sioux Falls Skyforce	–
31	Emmanuel Bandoumel	G	Canada	San Diego Clippers	Nebraska

=== Second round ===
Pick	Player	Pos.	Nationality	Team	College/country
1	Sy Chatman	F	United States	Iowa Wolves	Buffalo
2	Xavier Johnson	G	United States	Austin Spurs	Indiana
3	Vonterius Woolbright	G	United States	Delaware Blue Coats	Western Carolina
4	Keyon Menifield	G	United States	Texas Legends	Arkansas
5	Terrell Burden	G	United States	College Park Skyhawks	Kennesaw State
6	Kamani Johnson	F	United States	Memphis Hustle	Arkansas
7	Jamal Bieniemy	G	United States	Wisconsin Herd	Texas-El Paso
8	Charles Pride	G	United States	Austin Spurs	St. Bonaventure
9	Bobby Planutis	F	United States	Texas Legends	Indiana-Purdue Fort Wanye
10	E.J. Montgomery	F	United States	Birmingham Squadron	Kentucky
11	–	–	–	Delaware Blue Coats	–
12	DJ Rodman	G	United States	Capital City Go-Go	Southern California
13	Dee Barnes	G	United States	Salt Lake City Stars	Southern Utah
14	Devine Eke	F	United States	Santa Cruz Warriors	Radford
15	Sterling Manley	C	United States	Rip City Remix	North Carolina
16	–	–	–	Austin Spurs	–
17	Olisa Akonobi	C	Nigeria	Rip City Remix	Alabama A&M
18	Jericole Hellems	F	United States	Salt Lake City Stars	North Carolina State
19	Olin Carter III	G	United States	Valley Suns	San Diego
20	Cameron Parker	G	United States	Osceola Magic	Portland State
21	–	–	–	Long Island Nets	–
22	Allonzo Trier	G	United States	Rio Grande Valley Vipers	Arizona
23	Kavion Pippen	C	United States	Maine Celtics	Southern Illinois
24	William Kondrat	F	United States	Grand Rapids Gold	D'YouVille
25	Jayden Hardaway	G	United States	Capital City Go-Go	Memphis
26	Tray Jackson	F	United States	Oklahoma City Blue	Michigan
27	Ishmael Lane	C	United States	Indiana Mad Ants	Northwestern State
28	–	–	–	Delaware Blue Coats	–
29	–	–	–	Sioux Falls Skyforce	–
30	–	–	–	Sioux Falls Skyforce	–
31	Mike Scott	G	United States	San Diego Clippers	Idaho
