= Anse, Mississippi =

- Unincorporated community
- Location within Mississippi Location within the United States
- Coordinates: 32°07′09″N 90°06′03″W
- Country: United States
- State: Mississippi
- County: Rankin
- Elevation: 1,293 ft (394 m)
- Time zone: UTC-6 (Central (CST))
  - Summer (DST): UTC-5 (CDT)
- ZIP code: 39073
- Area code: 601
- GNIS feature ID: 666281

Anse is an unincorporated community located in Rankin County, Mississippi. Anse is located approximately 3 miles (4.8 km) southeast of Florence near U.S. Route 49. Anse had a post office from 1902 to 1908.
