= Lynwood, Mississippi =

- Unincorporated community
- Location within Mississippi Location within the United States
- Coordinates: 32°12′41″N 89°48′30″W
- Country: United States
- State: Mississippi
- County: Rankin
- Elevation: 531 ft (162 m)
- Time zone: UTC-6 (Central (CST))
  - Summer (DST): UTC-5 (CDT)
- ZIP code: 39545
- Area codes: 601 & 769
- GNIS feature ID: 709075

Lynwood is a ghost town in Rankin County, Mississippi, United States.

== History ==
Lynwood had a post office from 1881 to 1910. The population in 1900 was 46.
