= Pearl, Mississippi =

City in Mississippi, United States

- City
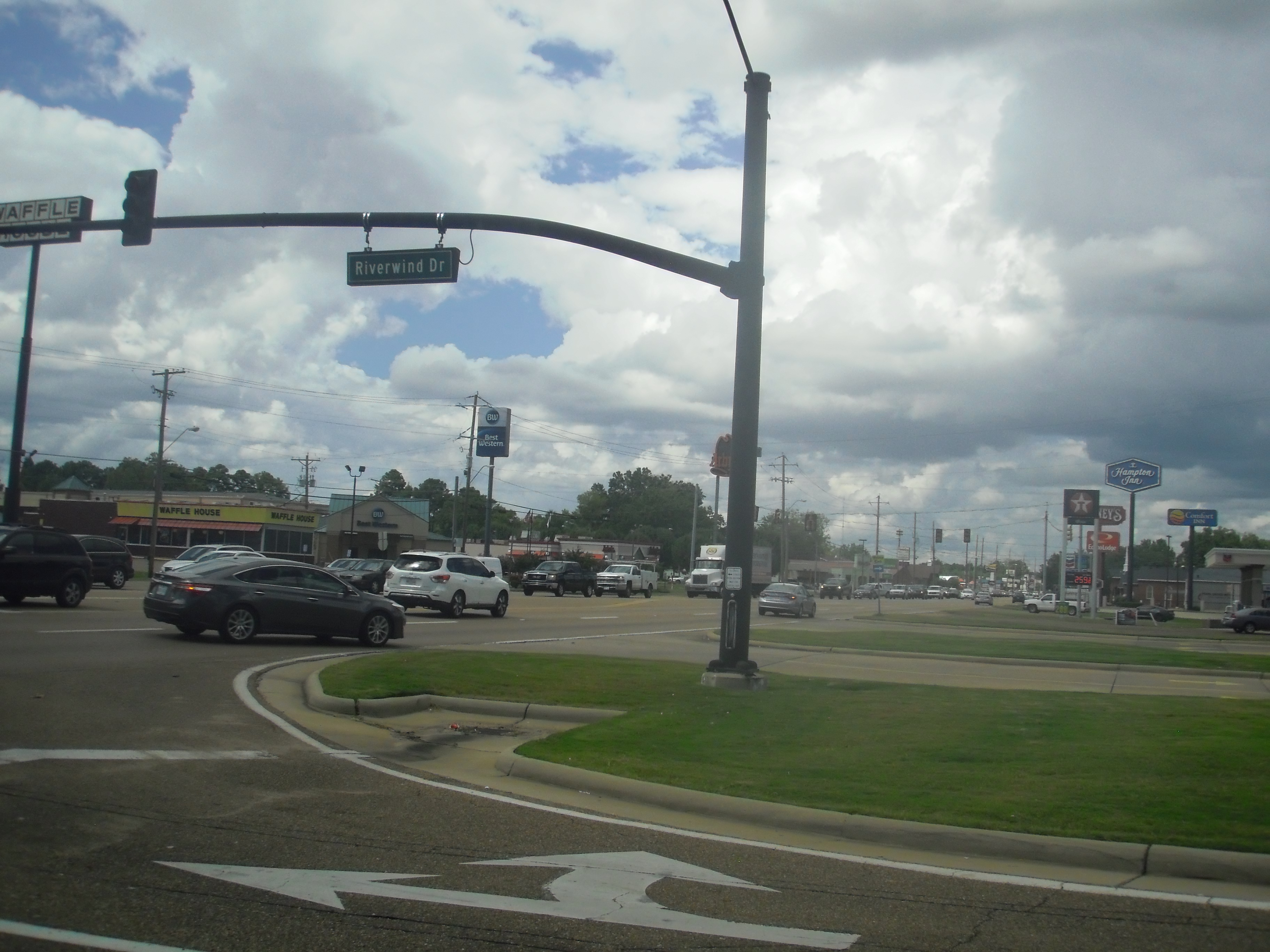
- Riverwind Drive

- Flag Seal Logo
- Nickname: "The Pearl of the South"
- Motto: "The City Creating Its Own Future"
- Location of Pearl in Rankin County, Mississippi

- Location of Mississippi in the United States

- Location of Pearl in the United States
- Coordinates: 32°16′19″N 90°06′19″W
- Country: United States
- State: Mississippi
- County: Rankin
- Settled: 1825
- Incorporated: June 29, 1973

Government
  - Type: Weak Mayor-Council
  - Mayor: Jake Windham (R)
  - Board of Aldermen: David Stovall – At-large; Sammy Williams – Ward 1 Keith Dennis – Ward 2 Gary Broadwater – Ward 3 Casey Foy – Ward 4 Dwight Knight – Ward 5 Kyle Foster – Ward 6

Area
  - Total: 25.61 sq mi (66.33 km^{2})
  - Land: 25.49 sq mi (66.01 km^{2})
  - Water: 0.12 sq mi (0.32 km^{2})
- Elevation: 276 ft (84.1 m)

Population (2020)
  - Total: 27,115
  - Density: 1,063.9/sq mi (410.78/km^{2})
- Time zone: UTC−6 (CST)
  - Summer (DST): UTC−5 (CDT)
- Zip Code(s); physical locations: 39208
- Zip Code(s); U.S. P.O. boxes: 39288
- Area codes: 601, 769
- FIPS code: 28-55760
- GNIS feature ID: 0675537
- Website: cityofpearl.com
- For additional city data see: City-Data

Pearl is a city located in Rankin County, Mississippi, United States, on the east side of the Pearl River across from the state capital Jackson. The population was 27,115 as of the 2020 census. It is part of the Jackson, Mississippi metropolitan area.

Pearl is the most populous city in Rankin County, and the 12th most populous city in the state. The city includes commercial, industrial, educational, and recreational areas, including Outlets of Mississippi, West Rankin Industrial Park, the Rankin Campus of Hinds Community College, and Trustmark Park.

== History ==
=== Early settlement and transportation ===
According to a historical sketch published by the City of Pearl, Harry Long received an 80-acre land grant in 1825 in present-day Rankin County, making him the first documented settler in the area of present-day Pearl. The area remained sparsely populated during the early 19th century, when the Pearl River limited eastward settlement from Jackson into Rankin County.

Transportation improvements helped spur development. The Jackson and Brandon Railroad and Bridge Company was chartered in 1836 and again in 1841 to build a bridge and railroad line connecting Brandon and Jackson. The railroad opened in 1849, and the bridge was completed in June 1850.

=== Pearson and Pearl schools ===
A community known as Pearson began to emerge in 1882 after John W. Pearson and his wife, Jennie, sold land to the Vicksburg and Meridian Railroad Company for a track through the area. The railroad later supported the development of a depot, post office, general store, cemetery, church, and public school.

By the early 20th century, settlement increased around present-day Highway 80 and Old Brandon Road. In 1911, local residents petitioned the Rankin County Board of Education for a more centrally located school to be called Pearl. The petition was granted, and the first Pearl School was built as a one-room wooden schoolhouse. In 1929, Pearl Consolidated School opened on the grounds of the present-day City Hall complex.

=== Incorporation ===
By the 1960s, Pearl had grown as suburban development from Jackson expanded into Rankin County. In 1968, a change in Mississippi sales tax law required tax collections to be made in municipalities and refunded a portion of collections to municipal governments. Local leaders began an incorporation effort so that tax revenue could be directed toward Pearl's public infrastructure and services.

A public meeting was held on September 11, 1968, at the Pearl-McLaurin Attendance Center auditorium to gauge interest in incorporation. According to the city historical sketch, all but six attendees voted in favor. On January 6, 1969, proposed city boundaries were laid out, a government was elected, and the name "Pearl" was chosen over the alternatives "Riverview" and "Brightsville".

The incorporation effort faced several legal challenges. On June 5, 1973, the Mississippi Supreme Court reversed a lower court ruling and ordered the incorporation of the City of Pearl. Charter Day was held on June 29, 1973, in the Pearl Junior High School auditorium, where Lieutenant Governor William Winter presented the city charter and commissions to the mayor and Board of Aldermen.

=== Later development ===
The Pearl Municipal Separate School District was created on May 18, 1976, by an ordinance of the City of Pearl Mayor and Board of Aldermen. The Pearl Chamber of Commerce was formed on August 24, 1978.

Pearl was affected by the violence of the Ku Klux Klan, and was white-only for most of the 20th century. In 1970, Pearl had 9,613 white residents and 10 black residents. By the 1990s Pearl had become more racially integrated, and by 2010 Black residents made up 23% of the population.

On October 1, 1997, Luke Woodham went on a shooting spree that ended at Pearl High School, killing two and injuring seven, after earlier stabbing his mother to death.

The city later redeveloped the former Pearl High School into City Hall, including the Pearl Police Department, public works departments, and city courts. A community center was built next door. Its clock tower is inscribed with the names of graduates of Pearl High School from 1949 through 1989, the period during which the high school occupied the building. A 25,000 sq ft (2,300 m^{2}) library opened near City Hall on July 18, 2005.

== Geography ==
According to the United States Census Bureau, the city has a total area of 25.61 square miles (66.3 km^{2}), of which 25.49 square miles (66.0 km^{2}) is land and 0.12 square miles (0.31 km^{2}) is water. Neighboring settlements include Flowood, Brandon, Richland, and the state capital Jackson.

According to its 2008 Annual Drinking Water Quality Report, Pearl's drinking water comes from the Sparta Sand Aquifer via nine wells that draw the water from it.

== Demographics ==
Historical population
Census	Pop.	Note	%±
1980	18,602		—
1990	19,588		5.3%
2000	21,961		12.1%
2010	25,092		14.3%
2020	27,115		8.1%
U.S. Decennial Census

=== 2020 census ===
As of the 2020 census, Pearl had a population of 27,115. The median age was 36.1 years. 24.4% of residents were under the age of 18 and 15.0% of residents were 65 years of age or older. For every 100 females there were 88.2 males, and for every 100 females age 18 and over there were 83.2 males age 18 and over.

97.3% of residents lived in urban areas, while 2.7% lived in rural areas.

There were 10,926 households and 6,662 families in Pearl, of which 33.0% had children under the age of 18 living in them. Of all households, 39.4% were married-couple households, 18.3% were households with a male householder and no spouse or partner present, and 35.9% were households with a female householder and no spouse or partner present. About 29.3% of all households were made up of individuals and 11.2% had someone living alone who was 65 years of age or older.

There were 11,697 housing units, of which 6.6% were vacant. The homeowner vacancy rate was 1.0% and the rental vacancy rate was 7.8%.

Racial composition as of the 2020 census
Race	Number	Percent
White	17,041	62.8%
Black or African American	7,270	26.8%
American Indian and Alaska Native	64	0.2%
Asian	326	1.2%
Native Hawaiian and Other Pacific Islander	86	0.3%
Some other race	1,004	3.7%
Two or more races	1,324	4.9%
Hispanic or Latino (of any race)	1,533	5.7%

=== 2010 census ===
According to the 2010 census, the racial demographics were: White alone 69.8%, African American 23.0%, American Indian and Alaska Native 0.2%, Asian 0.9%, Native Hawaiian and Other Pacific Islander 0.2%, two or more races 1.7%, and Hispanic or Latino of any race 6.4%.

=== 2000 census ===
As of the census of 2000, there were 21,961 people, 8,608 households, and 6,025 families residing in the city. The population density was 1,005.9 inhabitants per square mile (388.4/km^{2}). There were 9,128 housing units at an average density of 418.1 per square mile (161.4/km^{2}). The racial makeup of the city was 81.18% White, 16.24% African American, 0.22% Native American, 0.79% Asian, 0.03% Pacific Islander, 0.78% from other races, and 0.75% from two or more races. Hispanic or Latino of any race were 2.03% of the population.

There were 8,608 households, out of which 34.4% had children under the age of 18 living with them, 50.2% were married couples living together, 15.6% had a female householder with no husband present, and 30.0% were non-families. 25.0% of all households were made up of individuals, and 7.4% had someone living alone who was 65 years of age or older. The average household size was 2.55 and the average family size was 3.05.

In the city, the population was spread out, with 26.4% under the age of 18, 10.1% from 18 to 24, 31.8% from 25 to 44, 21.4% from 45 to 64, and 10.3% who were 65 years of age or older. The median age was 34 years. For every 100 females, there were 90.8 males. For every 100 females age 18 and over, there were 86.6 males.

The median income for a household in the city was $37,617, and the median income for a family was $42,013. Males had a median income of $30,860 versus $24,610 for females. The per capita income for the city was $17,136. About 9.2% of families and 12.2% of the population were below the poverty line, including 17.3% of those under age 18 and 12.4% of those age 65 or over.

== Economy ==
Pearl's economy includes retail, hospitality, manufacturing, education, and government-related activity. In 2024, Pearl's largest employment sectors were health care and social assistance, retail trade, and educational services, according to Data USA. Data USA reported Pearl's 2024 median household income as $61,695 and median property value as $182,500.

The city is home to Outlets of Mississippi, a 315,000-square-foot outlet center development in Pearl.

In 2026, Siemens Energy announced plans to construct a new manufacturing facility at West Rankin Industrial Park in Pearl. The Mississippi Development Authority said the project represented an investment of up to $300 million and was expected to create up to 300 advanced manufacturing jobs. The facility was planned to produce electrical grid components and increase Siemens Energy's production capacity in Rankin County.

Rankin First Economic Development Authority has identified business attraction, retention and expansion, workforce and site development, legislative advocacy, and tourism as focus areas for Rankin County economic development.

In 2025, the Jackson City Council approved a settlement allowing Pearl and Flowood to annex Jackson-owned but unincorporated land near Jackson–Medgar Wiley Evers International Airport. Mississippi Today reported that the agreement was expected to clear the way for economic development around airport-owned land and that Pearl and Flowood would provide services in their incorporated areas and collect property and sales tax revenue generated there.

== Sports ==
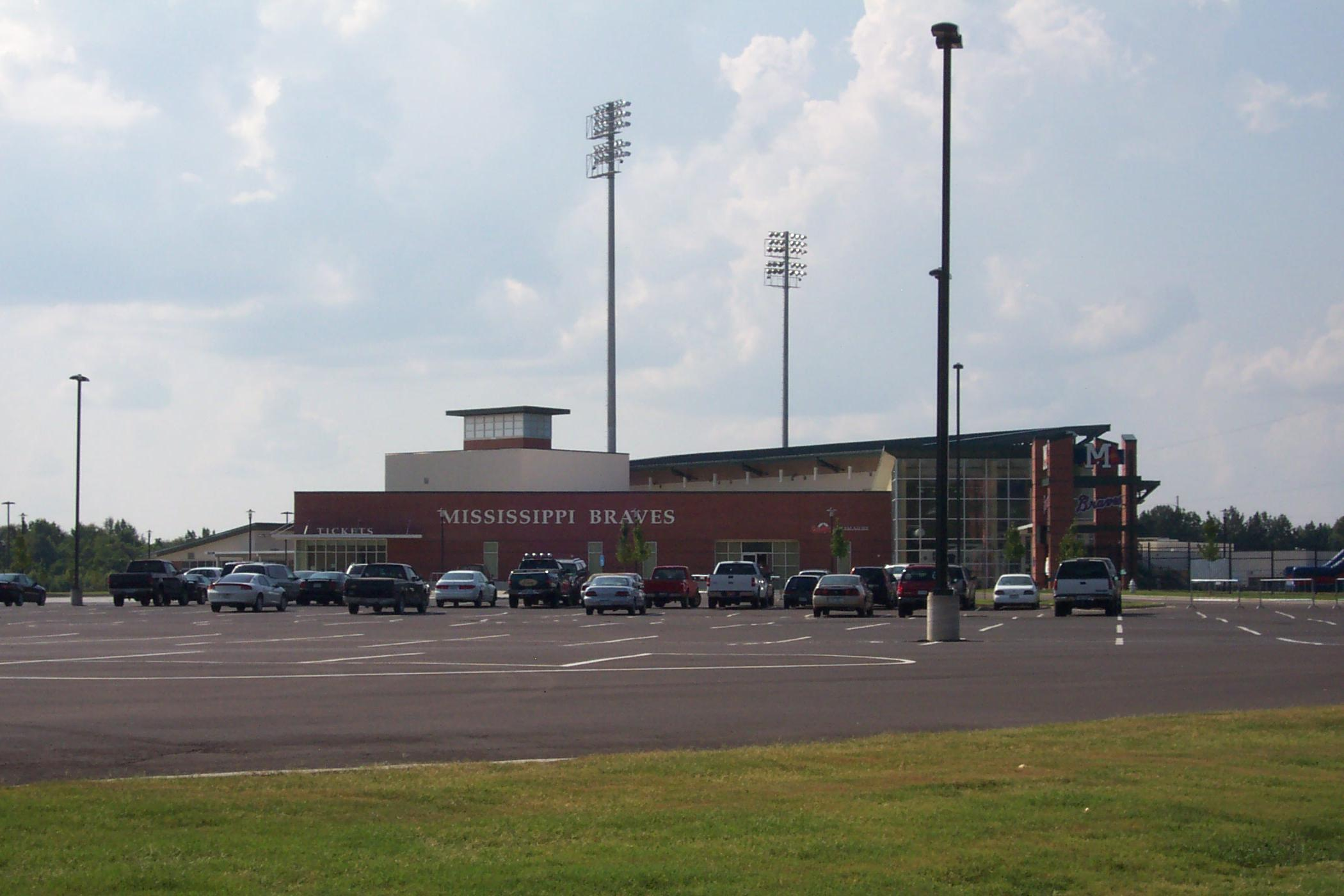
Trustmark Park

Trustmark Park is a baseball stadium in Pearl and one of the city's primary sports and event venues. The ballpark opened in 2005 as the home of the Mississippi Braves, the Double-A Minor League Baseball affiliate of the Atlanta Braves. The Braves played at Trustmark Park from 2005 through 2024 before relocating to Columbus, Georgia, where they became the Columbus Clingstones.

The Mississippi Mud Monsters baseball team plays in the Frontier League, an MLB Partner League. Founded in 2024, the Mud Monsters began play at Trustmark Park in 2025, continuing professional baseball in Pearl after the departure of the Mississippi Braves.

Trustmark Park also hosts college baseball events. The ballpark has hosted the Governor's Cup between Mississippi State and Ole Miss. The 2026 Mississippi Farm Bureau Governor's Cup at Trustmark Park drew 8,223 fans and was announced as a sellout. In 2026, Trustmark Park was selected to host the MLB HBCU Power Series, a multi-day HBCU baseball showcase held in conjunction with Major League Baseball. The event was scheduled for February 12–15 and included Texas Southern, Prairie View A&M, Alabama A&M, Grambling State, Jackson State, and Alcorn State.

In September 2025, the Mud Monsters announced that Trustmark Park would replace its infield dirt and grass with synthetic turf. The organization said Spectrum Entertainment would install Major Play Matrix synthetic turf covering more than 40,000 square feet. Mud Monsters general manager Andrew Seymour said the new infield would help reduce rain delays and make the venue more usable for concerts, showcases, and community events.

== Culture and events ==
Pearl was designated a Mississippi Main Street Association community in 2021. Main Street Pearl was created as part of an effort to develop a downtown district and support revitalization around the city's historic core. The Mississippi Main Street Association lists Pearl Day Festival, the Christmas Parade, Lighting of the Christmas Tree Ceremony, Trick or Treat Street, and the Easter Egg Hunt among Main Street Pearl events.

Trustmark Park has also been used for community and seasonal events. In 2025, the ballpark hosted Main Street Pearl's Oktoberfest during the day and MonstoBEERfest, a ticketed beer festival, that evening.

Later that year, Trustmark Park hosted The Southern Lights, a walk-through holiday attraction featuring more than 2.5 million lights, real-ice skating, fire pits, and train rides.

== Parks and recreation ==
Pearl operates several parks and recreational facilities, including Bright Park, Jenkins Park, Center City Complex, Pearl Youth Baseball Complex, and Pearl Municipal Golf Course. The city parks system includes three parks, 15 baseball and softball fields, courts and fields for basketball, football, soccer, and tennis, and a municipal golf course.

Bright Park, located on Flynn Drive, includes a 2/3-mile paved walking track, a pond, pavilion, playground, and certified arboretum with 37 tree species. Jenkins Park, located on Old Whitfield Road, includes a ball field, basketball court, walking track, playground, picnic area, and stage. Pearl Municipal Golf Course is an 18-hole public course on Center City Drive that opened in 1990 and was designed by Frank "Max" Maxwell Jr.

== Government ==
=== Municipal government ===
The City of Pearl is led by an elected Mayor and Board of Aldermen. The Board of Aldermen includes one at-large alderman and six ward aldermen.

=== State representation ===
The Mississippi Department of Corrections Central Mississippi Correctional Facility is in an unincorporated area in Rankin County, near Pearl. In 2007 the Mississippi Highway Patrol opened a driver's license facility across the highway from the prison.

The Mississippi Department of Environmental Quality operates the Central Regional Office and the MDEQ Laboratory in unincorporated Rankin County, near Pearl.

== Education ==
=== Colleges and universities ===
Pearl is home to the Rankin Campus of Hinds Community College, a public community college campus located off U.S. Highway 80. Rankin County is in the Hinds Community College district.

The Rankin Campus opened in 1983 as a commuter campus. In 2026, Hinds broke ground on The Commons, a planned three-story campus facility with a 175-bed residence hall, food court plaza, health center, and gymnasium, with an expected opening in 2027.

Academy of Hair Design-Pearl is a postsecondary cosmetology school in Pearl. Data USA reported total enrollment of 48 students in 2023 and listed its most common one- to two-year postsecondary certificate concentration as general cosmetology.

=== Primary and secondary schools ===
The City of Pearl's public schools are served by the Pearl Public School District. The district's board is appointed by the City of Pearl Board of Aldermen.

- Pearl High School
- Pearl Junior High School
- Pearl Upper Elementary
- Pearl Lower Elementary
- Northside Elementary

=== Private schools ===
- Faith Academy – Grades Pre-kindergarten through 8 (part of the Midsouth Association of Independent Schools)
- Park Place Christian Academy – Grades Pre-kindergarten through 12. PPCA graduated its first senior class in May 2012.

== Media ==
Pearl Municipal Broadcasting is a city-owned outlet broadcasting governmental, educational, and local programming on television, and on radio station WPBP 104.3 FM.

== Infrastructure ==
=== Transportation ===
==== Air travel ====
Pearl is served by Jackson–Medgar Wiley Evers International Airport, located at Allen C. Thompson Field in Rankin County.

==== Ground transportation ====
- Interstate 55
- Interstate 20
- U.S. Highway 49
- U.S. Highway 80 - the main corridor through Pearl
- Mississippi Highway 25 - also known as Lakeland Drive
- Mississippi Highway 475

The West Rankin Parkway opened in November 2025, connecting Highway 80 in Pearl to Flowood Drive in Flowood. Local officials said the parkway could support future economic development because of nearby land, rail access, and interstate access.

=== Public safety ===
Law enforcement within the city limits of Pearl is handled by the Pearl Police Department. The city has no jail facilities and instead uses the Rankin County Jail, which is operated by the Rankin County Sheriff's Department.

Fire protection and prevention within the city limits of Pearl is handled by the Pearl Fire Department. The department operates four stations throughout the city.

== Notable people ==
- Tommy Aldridge - drummer for Black Oak Arkansas, Ozzy Osbourne, Whitesnake and others
- Justin Jenkins, former National Football League wide receiver
- George Kersh, sprinter
- Bianca Knight, gold medal sprinter at the 2012 Summer Olympics
- LeAnn Rimes - singer
- Ray Rogers former member of the Mississippi House of Representatives
- Ty Tabor - singer, guitarist for King's X
- Eric Washington, former National Basketball Association player

== See also ==
- List of sundown towns in the United States
