= Langford, Mississippi =

- Unincorporated community
- Location within Mississippi Location within the United States
- Coordinates: 32°20′48″N 89°58′20″W
- Country: United States
- State: Mississippi
- County: Rankin
- Elevation: 394 ft (120 m)
- Time zone: UTC-6 (Central (CST))
  - Summer (DST): UTC-5 (CDT)
- Area codes: 601 & 769
- GNIS feature ID: 672299

Langford is an unincorporated community in Rankin County, Mississippi, United States.

A post office operated under the name Langford from 1892 to 1934.
