= Star, Mississippi =

Unincorporated community in Mississippi, US

- Town
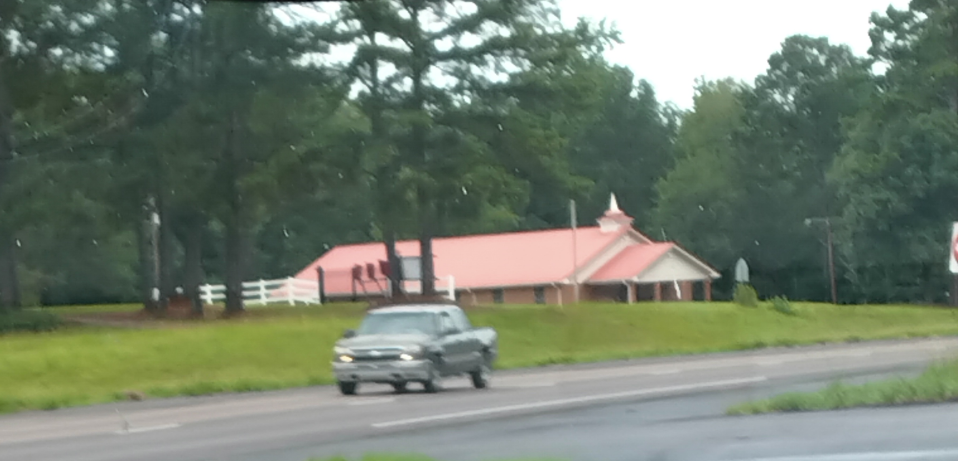

- Location within the state of Mississippi
- Coordinates: 32°05′39″N 90°02′46″W
- Country: United States
- State: Mississippi
- County: Rankin
- Elevation: 420 ft (130 m)
- Time zone: UTC-6 (Central (CST))
  - Summer (DST): UTC-5 (CDT)
- ZIP codes: 39167, 39073, 39042
- GNIS feature ID: 678222

Star is a town in Rankin County, Mississippi, United States, located southeast of Jackson. Its ZIP code is 39167, area code is 601 and local exchange is 845. The elevation is 423 feet. Star appears on the Star U.S. Geological Survey Map. The community is part of the Jackson Metropolitan Statistical Area.

== History ==
Star was founded in July 1900 as a train stop when the Gulf and Ship Island RR (later becoming the Illinois Central and now the Canadian National RR) passed through. It had a bank, hotel, car dealership, numerous stores, and a school. Its prosperity suffered as people began to leave the rural areas to move to the city.

The school was scheduled to open for the 1921–22 school year but did not open until after Christmas that year. Up until that time the elementary students attended school at Wesleyanna Methodist Church and the high school age students went to Star Baptist Church. Star fielded several sports teams including basketball, baseball, and football. Although only having a football team for the 1937 through the 1941 seasons (a team was not fielded in the 1942 season due to the outbreak of World War II) Star gained some measure of success, defeating Mendenhall and Magee during that period. They also beat rival Florence four out of the five times they played. The 1937 team won the Middle Mississippi Class B Championship with a victory over Camden at Millsaps.

Star is mentioned in Faith Hill's song, "Mississippi Girl", as she was raised in Star.

On February 17, 2026, after a decades-long battle, an October 2025 petition for incorporation was officially approved by a Rankin County judge, granting the community township.

== Notable people ==
- Niels Diffrient, designer.
- Faith Hill, singer; raised in Star.
