= Gulde, Mississippi =

- Unincorporated community
- Location within the state of Mississippi
- Coordinates: 32°17′56″N 89°51′48″W
- Country: United States
- State: Mississippi
- County: Rankin
- Elevation: 361 ft (110 m)
- Time zone: UTC-6 (Central (CST))
  - Summer (DST): UTC-5 (CDT)
- GNIS feature ID: 691911

Gulde is an unincorporated community in Rankin County, Mississippi, United States.

Gulde was established as a flag station on the Alabama and Vicksburg Railway in 1858, and is said to be named for a railroad official.

The Gulde Methodist Church is located south of the settlement, and the Gulde Cemetery is north. The church was constructed in 1960.
