= Anse =

Anse may refer to:

== Places ==
- Anse, Belgium, a municipality
- Canton of Anse, Rhône department, France, an administrative division
  - Anse, Rhône, a commune and seat of the canton
- Anse, Mississippi, an unincorporated community in the United States

== Other uses ==
- Devil Anse Hatfield (1839–1921), patriarch who led the Hatfield family in the Hatfield-McCoy feud
- Anse Moore (1917-1993), American baseball player
- Anse Bundren, a major character in the 1930 novel As I Lay Dying by William Faulkner

== See also ==
- Ans (disambiguation)
