= Dobson, Mississippi =

- Ghost town
- Location within the state of Mississippi
- Coordinates: 32°09′46″N 89°53′50″W
- Country: United States
- State: Mississippi
- County: Rankin
- Elevation: 394 ft (120 m)
- Time zone: UTC-6 (Central (CST))
  - Summer (DST): UTC-5 (CDT)
- GNIS feature ID: 709022

Dobson is a ghost town in Rankin County, Mississippi, United States.

Dobson was located approximately 9.6 mi (15.4 km) southeast of Brandon.

Dobson had a post office from 1886 to 1909.

R.M. "Uncle Dock" Gray of Dobson owned the first car in the community, a Maxwell touring car.

Dobson still had a voting precinct in 1984.
