= Kevin Cross Jr. =

American basketball player (born 2000)

No. 23 – Shandong Honey Badger
- Position: Small forward
- League: National Basketball League

Personal information
- Born: June 22, 2000 (age 26) Little Rock, Arkansas, U.S.
- Listed height: 6 ft 8 in (2.03 m)
- Listed weight: 225 lb (102 kg)

Career information
- High school: Mills University Studies HS (Little Rock, Arkansas)
- College: Nebraska (2019–2020); Tulane (2020–2024)
- NBA draft: 2024: undrafted
- Playing career: 2024–present

Career history
- 2024: Riesen Ludwigsburg
- 2024–2025: Rio Grande Valley Vipers
- 2025: Tijuana Zonkeys
- 2025: Hong Kong Bulls
- 2025–2026: Changsha Yongsheng
- 2026: Tianjin Pioneers
- 2026: Winnipeg Sea Bears
- 2026–present: Shandong Honey Badger

Career highlights
- NBL champion (2025); 3x Third-team All-AAC (2022–2024)
Medals
Men's basketball
Representing United States
Summer Universiade
Bronze medal – third place	2021 China	Team

Kevin Cross Jr. (born June 22, 2000) is an American professional basketball player for the Shandong Honey Badger of the National Basketball League (NBL). He played college basketball for the Nebraska Cornhuskers and the Tulane Green Wave.

== Early life and high school career ==
Cross attended Mills University Studies High School in Little Rock, Arkansas. He received scant recruiting attention prior to his senior season. Cross averaged 18 points, 10 rebounds, two assists, a block, and a steal per game to lead the team to the Arkansas Class 4A final. He committed to play college basketball at Nebraska, choosing the Cornhuskers over TCU and Oklahoma State.

== College career ==
Cross averaged 7.1 points and 3.9 rebounds per game as a freshman at Nebraska as the team finished 7-25. Following the season he transferred to Tulane. As a sophomore, Cross averaged 6.9 points and 4.7 rebounds per game. He averaged 13.8 points, 6.8 rebounds, and 3.6 assists per game as a junior. As a senior, Cross averaged 14.8 points, 6.7 rebounds and 4.2 assists per game en route to third-team All-AAC honors. Alongside teammate Jaylen Forbes, he declared for the 2023 NBA draft before withdrawing and returning to Tulane. On December 19, 2023, Cross was named Oscar Robertson National Player of the Week after posting 25 points, 12 rebounds, and 12 assists in a double-overtime win over Furman. In his final season, he averaged 17.5 points, 7.3 rebounds and 4.6 assists per game, shooting 51 percent from the field and 41 percent from beyond the arc.

== Professional career ==
After going undrafted in the 2024 NBA draft, Cross signed with Riesen Ludwigsburg of the Basketball Bundesliga on September 6, 2024. However, on October 15, Cross terminated his contract after four games.

Cross was selected by the Indiana Mad Ants in the 2024 NBA G League draft and was traded to the Rio Grande Valley Vipers. He averaged 6.3 points and 3.9 rebounds per game.

On April 10, 2025, Cross signed with Tijuana Zonkeys of the Mexican CIBACOPA.

== National team career ==
Cross was a part of the Tulane team chosen to represent the United States in the 2021 Summer Universiade in China. In the semifinals, he scored 18 points in a 82-95 loss to Brazil. Cross averaged 10.6 points and 4.6 rebounds per game, helping the U.S. receive a bronze medal.
