= Mississippi Department of Environmental Quality =

The Mississippi Department of Environmental Quality (MDEQ) is a state agency of Mississippi that oversees environmental quality of the air, land, and water in the state. Its headquarters are in Jackson.

== Regional offices ==
- Central Regional Office (unincorporated Rankin County, near Pearl)
- North Regional Office (unincorporated Lafayette County, near Oxford)
- South Regional Office (Bolton State Office Building, Biloxi)
