= Crossroads, Mississippi =

Crossroads (or Cross Roads) may refer to the following unincorporated communities in the U.S. state of Mississippi:

- Crossroads, George County, Mississippi
- Crossroads, Pearl River County, Mississippi
