= Johns, Mississippi =

- Unincorporated community
- Location within Mississippi Location within the United States
- Coordinates: 32°07′52″N 89°50′17″W
- Country: United States
- State: Mississippi
- County: Rankin
- Elevation: 358 ft (109 m)
- Time zone: UTC-6 (Central (CST))
  - Summer (DST): UTC-5 (CDT)
- Area codes: 601 & 769
- GNIS feature ID: 671904

Johns is an unincorporated community in Rankin County, Mississippi, United States.

In 1900, Johns had a population of 32.

A post office operated under the name Johns from 1891 to 1974.

The Johns Gas Field is located nears Johns.
