= Pearl High School (Mississippi) =

High school in Mississippi, United States

Location
- 500 Pirates Cove; Pearl, (Rankin County), Mississippi 39208; United States
- 32.2705°N 90.0933°W

Information
- Type: Public high school
- Principal: Dr. Michael Brewer
- Staff: 79.90 (FTE)
- Enrollment: 1,280 (2023-2024)
- Student to teacher ratio: 16.02
- Colors: Navy and gold
- Mascot: Pirates
- Website: phs.pearlk12.com

Pearl High School is a suburban public high school located in Pearl, Mississippi, United States. It is part of the Pearl Public School District.

== History ==
Pearl High School was established in 1948 with the construction of a high school building next to the elementary school. Before 1948, Pearl students had to attend high school at Central High School in nearby Jackson. The school's first principal was Mr. L.W. Bright.

Pearl became a city in 1973 and it was at this time that Pearl began the process to withdraw its schools from the Rankin County School District. The Pearl Municipal Separate School District, now known as Pearl Public School District, was finally formed in 1976.

Work began on a new high school in 1987 and classes began in the new school the following year and continue in this location today. The current principal is Dr. Michael Brewer.

=== School shooting ===
A school shooting occurred on October 1, 1997, at the school. The gunman, 16-year-old Luke Woodham, killed two students and injured seven others at the school after killing his mother at their home earlier that morning.

== Achievements ==
In 1991, Pearl High School was recognized by the United States Department of Education as a Blue Ribbon School.

== Athletics ==
Pearl High School has several sports teams. These include football, band, baseball, powerlifting, boys and girls basketball, boys and girls soccer, bowling, softball, cheerleading, swim, cross country, tennis, dance, track and field, golf and volleyball. The mascot is a pirate. School colors are Blue & Gold.

== Clubs and organizations ==
Pearl High School has several student clubs and organizations. These include Beta Club, National Junior Historical Society, Choral Music, NJROTC, DECA, Pirate Band, FCCLA, Pirate Connectors, Fellowship of Christian Athletes, Student Council, Future Educators of America, Super Scholars, International Thespian Society, The Pirate Yearbook, Key Club, The Pirate Speaks Newspaper, National Art Honor Society, Winter Guard, and National Honor Society.

== Notable graduates ==
- Tommy Aldridge - Graduated in 1968 - Drummer for Black Oak Arkansas, Whitesnake and Ozzy Osbourne.
