= Lance Varner =

American politician

Member of the Mississippi House of Representatives from the 62nd district
- Incumbent
- Assumed office January 2, 2024
- Preceded by: Tom Weathersby

Personal details
- Born: January 30, 1980 (age 46) Flowood, Mississippi
- Party: Republican
- Education: Liberty University
- Occupation: Politician
- Profession: Auctions, Real Estate

Lance Varner serves as a member of the Mississippi House of Representatives for the 62nd District, affiliating with the Republican Party, a position he has held since 2024.
