= Monterey, Mississippi =

- Unincorporated community
- Location within Mississippi Location within the United States
- Coordinates: 32°11′06″N 90°04′51″W
- Country: United States
- State: Mississippi
- County: Rankin
- Elevation: 430 ft (130 m)
- Time zone: UTC-6 (Central (CST))
  - Summer (DST): UTC-5 (CDT)
- ZIP codes: 39208, 39073
- Area codes: 601 & 769
- GNIS feature ID: 673735

Monterey is an unincorporated community in Rankin County, Mississippi, United States.

== History ==
The settlement was named after a battle fought at Monterrey, Mexico, by soldiers returning from the Mexican–American War.

Monterey had a post office from 1847 to 1867.

The population in 1900 was 36.

Monterey Methodist Church, and the Monterey Volunteer Fire Department, are both located at the settlement.
