= Florence, Mississippi =

City in Mississippi, US

Florence
- City
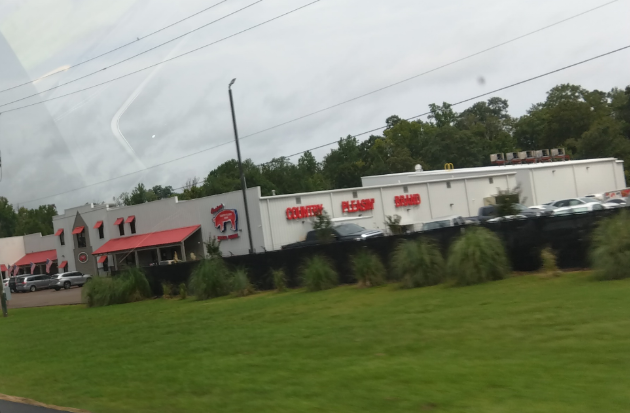

- Flag
- Nickname: Steen's Creek
- Location of Florence, Mississippi

- Location in the United States
- Coordinates: 32°9′14″N 90°7′19″W
- Country: United States
- State: Mississippi
- County: Rankin

Government
  - Type: Mayor-Council
  - Mayor: Trey Gunn
  - Board of Aldermen: Brent Sistrunk; Kyle Martin; Mason Herrin; John Banks; Brian Grantham

Area
  - Total: 8.09 sq mi (20.96 km^{2})
  - Land: 8.09 sq mi (20.96 km^{2})
  - Water: 0 sq mi (0.00 km^{2})
- Elevation: 312 ft (95 m)

Population (2020)
  - Total: 4,572
  - Density: 565.0/sq mi (218.13/km^{2})
- Time zone: UTC-6 (Central (CST))
  - Summer (DST): UTC-5 (CDT)
- ZIP code: 39073
- Area code: 601
- FIPS code: 28-24980
- GNIS feature ID: 0670045
- Website: http://www.cityofflorencems.com/

Florence is a city in Rankin County, Mississippi, United States. As of the 2020 census, Florence had a population of 4,572. It is part of the Jackson Metropolitan Statistical Area.

== Geography ==
According to the United States Census Bureau, the city has a total area of 5.9 square miles (15 km^{2}).

The 2010 Census showed a population of 4,141, a 72.8% growth from the 2000 Census. The current city limits have grown northward towards Richland. Florence was the 12th fastest growing city in Mississippi at the 2010 Census. The city has grown both eastward and westward and will continue to expand towards the Pearl River, eventually stopping at the Pearl River, which separates Rankin County from Hinds County.

== Demographics ==
Historical population
Census	Pop.	Note	%±
1910	260		—
1920	207		−20.4%
1930	272		31.4%
1940	368		35.3%
1950	313		−14.9%
1960	360		15.0%
1970	404		12.2%
1980	1,111		175.0%
1990	1,831		64.8%
2000	2,396		30.9%
2010	4,141		72.8%
2020	4,572		10.4%
U.S. Decennial Census

=== 2020 census ===
Florence racial composition
Race	Num.	Perc.
White (non-Hispanic)	3,781	82.7%
Black or African American (non-Hispanic)	608	13.3%
Native American	3	0.07%
Asian	10	0.22%
Other/Mixed	115	2.52%
Hispanic or Latino	55	1.2%

As of the 2020 census, there were 4,572 people, 1,698 households, and 1,204 families residing in the city. The median age was 34.8 years. 28.3% of residents were under the age of 18 and 13.0% were 65 years of age or older. For every 100 females, there were 84.2 males, and for every 100 females age 18 and over there were 80.6 males.

0.8% of residents lived in urban areas, while 99.2% lived in rural areas.

Of all households, 45.3% had children under the age of 18 living in them. 52.4% were married-couple households, 13.1% were households with a male householder and no spouse or partner present, and 29.4% were households with a female householder and no spouse or partner present. About 22.0% of all households were made up of individuals, and 10.2% had someone living alone who was 65 years of age or older.

There were 1,827 housing units, of which 7.1% were vacant. The homeowner vacancy rate was 1.8% and the rental vacancy rate was 12.1%.

=== 2010 census ===
The racial makeup of the city was 85.3% White, 13.1% African American, 0.1% Native American, 0.5% Asian, 0.3% from other races, and 0.7% from two or more races. Hispanic or Latino of any race were 1.1% of the population.

There were 1,558 households, out of which 42.5% had children under the age of 18 living with them, 55.6% were married couples living together, 13.4% had a female householder with no husband present, and 25.8% were non-families. 22.4% of all households were made up of individuals living alone, and 8.2% had someone living alone who was 65 years of age or older. The average household size was 2.64 and the average family size was 3.11.

In the city, the population was spread out, with 28.7% under the age of 18, 9.6% from 18 to 24, 33.2% from 25 to 44, 18.8% from 45 to 64, and 9.6% who were 65 years of age or older. The median age was 32 years. For every 100 females, there were 87.0 males. For every 100 females age 18 and over, there were 83.2 males.

The median income for a household in the city was $39,400, and the median income for a family was $46,250. Males had a median income of $35,030 versus $24,327 for females. The per capita income for the town was $18,162. About 9.6% of families and 10.8% of the population were below the poverty line, including 14.8% of those under age 18 and 12.0% of those age 65 or over.

== Education ==
The city of Florence's public schools are served by the Rankin County School District. This includes Florence High School.

=== Public schools ===
- Steen's Creek Elementary School (Grades K–2)
- Florence Elementary School (Grades 3–5)
- Florence Middle School (Grades 6–8)
- Florence High School (Grades 9–12)
- McLaurin Elementary School (Grades Pre-K–6)
- McLaurin High School (Grades 7–12)

=== Colleges and universities ===
- Wesley College (Closed July 2010)

== Notable people ==
- Buddy Alliston, former professional football player
- Robert Braddy, baseball player and coach
- Carl Corley, author and illustrator
- Rosetta A. Ferguson, former member of the Michigan House of Representatives
- Konnor Griffin, Major League Baseball outfielder
- Paul McCoy, singer
- Sollie Norwood, member of the Mississippi State Senate
- Tate Reeves, politician
- Lance Varner, member of the Mississippi House of Representatives
- The Weeks, band
