= Pearl Public School District =

School district in Mississippi

Coordinates: 32.283123°N 90.105317°W

The Pearl Public School District is a public school district based in Pearl, Mississippi (USA) in Greater Jackson. The district's boundaries parallel the city limits of Pearl.

== Schools ==
- Pearl High School (Grades 9 through 12) Built in 1989; Expansions* in 1997, 2003 and 2005
- Pearl Junior High School (Grades 6 through 8) Built in 1932; Expansions* in 1982, 1989, and 2004
  - Pearl voters approved a $1.5 million bond issue to construct a new junior high school on December 1, 1981.
- Pearl Lower Elementary (Grades K and 1) Built in 1932; Expansions* in 1999 and 2005
- Northside Elementary (Grades 2 and 3) Built in 1970; Expansions* in 1992, 1999 and 2007
- Pearl Upper Elementary (Grades 4 and 5) Built in 1965; Expansions* in 1999

*Expansions include anything from adding a new wing or classrooms to adding new administrative offices, to adding a press box to the baseball field.

== Ratings ==
Pearl High School is currently rated a 5, which is the highest education level a school can reach in our nation's standard as set down by the No Child Left Behind Act, signed by President George W. Bush. Schools ratings are based on the Mississippi Curriculum Tests, which are issued every year to determine a school's effectiveness on its students.

== Extracurricular programs ==
The Pearl Junior High School and Pearl High School athletic teams compete in football, baseball, soccer, track & field, and softball. The school's mascot is the pirate.

The teams have had many state championships in sports such as Track & Field, Baseball, Soccer and Cheerleading. The high school has also won state championships in Band, Dance, and Drama. For the past 5 years Pearl High School has won the 4-A State Championship in Soccer. The football team has won numerous district titles, its latest being in 2008 until winning back-to-back south state championships in 2016 and 2017. In 2017, Pearl Football pulled out its first and only championship in school history.

Other organizations have also competed in state and district championships in Band, Choir, Dance, and Drama. The school's band is a worldwide known band. The Pearl Pirate Band have received all Superior rating for 50 years from MHSSA/MBA from 1969–2019 and is the only band to do so. They performed in the Macy's Thanksgiving Day Parade in 1999. They won the 2008 and 2012 Mississippi Indoor Percussion Circuit Championships. The Pirate Band are 4x State Champions from 2007 4A State Marching Champion, 2009 and 2011–12 5A State Marching Champions. They are the Pearl Pirate Band and have a partial reputation for performing at theme parks such as Disney World and Six Flags. They are former Bands of America finalists, and former Grand National Championship to the Super Regional Championship 1980–2014. They also competed at the Emerald Coast Marching Classic in the 1980s, 2015–16, and 2018.

== School uniforms ==
Approved by the board on January 11, 1999 and beginning in August 1999, elementary school (K–5) students are required to wear school uniforms.

== Demographics ==
=== 2006–07 school year ===
There were a total of 3,849 students enrolled in the Pearl Public School District during the 2006–07 school year. The gender makeup of the district was 49% female and 51% male. The racial makeup of the district was 29.07% African American, 64.69% White, 5.25% Hispanic, 0.81% Asian, and 0.18% Native American. 44.4% of the district's students were eligible to receive free lunch.

=== Previous school years ===
| School Year | Enrollment | Gender Makeup | | Racial Makeup | | | | |
| School Year | Enrollment | Female | Male | Asian | African American | Hispanic | Native American | White |
|---|---|---|---|---|---|---|---|---|
| 2005-06 | 3,824 | 50% | 50% | 0.81% | 28.01% | 3.58% | 0.13% | 67.47% |
| 2004-05 | 3,726 | 49% | 51% | 0.78% | 28.61% | 2.76% | 0.05% | 67.79% |
| 2003-04 | 3,647 | 49% | 51% | 0.66% | 26.60% | 2.19% | 0.14% | 70.41% |
| 2002-03 | 3,718 | 49% | 51% | 0.78% | 25.12% | 2.07% | 0.08% | 71.95% |

== Accountability statistics ==
| | 2006-07 | 2005-06 | 2004-05 | 2003-04 | 2002-03 |
|---|---|---|---|---|---|
| District Accreditation Status | Accredited | Accredited | Accredited | Accredited | Accredited |
School Performance Classifications
| Level 5 (Superior Performing) Schools | 2 | 1 | 1 | 1 | 1 |
| Level 4 (Exemplary) Schools | 2 | 3 | 3 | 2 | 1 |
| Level 3 (Successful) Schools | 0 | 0 | 0 | 1 | 2 |
| Level 2 (Under Performing) Schools | 0 | 0 | 0 | 0 | 0 |
| Level 1 (Low Performing) Schools | 0 | 0 | 0 | 0 | 0 |
| Not Assigned | 1 | 1 | 1 | 1 | 1 |

== See also ==
- List of school districts in Mississippi
