= Cleary, Mississippi =

- Census-designated place
- Location within Mississippi Location within the United States
- Coordinates: 32°09′56″N 90°10′50″W
- Country: United States
- State: Mississippi
- County: Rankin

Area
  - Total: 5.11 sq mi (13.24 km^{2})
  - Land: 4.92 sq mi (12.73 km^{2})
  - Water: 0.20 sq mi (0.52 km^{2})
- Elevation: 384 ft (117 m)

Population (2020)
  - Total: 1,688
  - Density: 343.5/sq mi (132.63/km^{2})
- Time zone: UTC-6 (Central (CST))
  - Summer (DST): UTC-5 (CDT)
- Area codes: 601 & 769
- GNIS feature ID: 668593

Cleary is an unincorporated community and census-designated place in Rankin County, Mississippi, United States. Per the 2020 census, the population was 1,688.

== History ==
A post office operated under the name Cleary from 1896 to 1908.

== Geography ==
According to the U.S. Census Bureau, the community has an area of 5.113 square miles (13.24 km^{2}); 4.915 square miles (12.73 km^{2}) of its area is land, and 0.198 square miles (0.51 km^{2}) is water.

== Demographics ==
Historical population
Census	Pop.	Note	%±
2010	1,544		—
2020	1,688		9.3%
U.S. Decennial Census; 2010 2020

Cleary first appeared as a census designated place in the 2010 U.S. census.

=== Racial and ethnic composition ===
Cleary CDP, Mississippi – Racial and ethnic composition Note: the US Census treats Hispanic/Latino as an ethnic category. This table excludes Latinos from the racial categories and assigns them to a separate category. Hispanics/Latinos may be of any race.
Race / Ethnicity (NH = Non-Hispanic)	Pop 2010	Pop 2020	% 2010	% 2020
White alone (NH)	1,439	1,502	93.20%	88.98%
Black or African American alone (NH)	84	104	5.44%	6.16%
Native American or Alaska Native alone (NH)	1	1	0.06%	0.06%
Asian alone (NH)	2	4	0.13%	0.24%
Native Hawaiian or Pacific Islander alone (NH)	0	0	0.00%	0.00%
Other race alone (NH)	0	6	0.00%	0.36%
Mixed race or Multiracial (NH)	6	51	0.39%	3.02%
Hispanic or Latino (any race)	12	20	0.78%	1.18%
Total	1,544	1,688	100.00%	100.00%

=== 2020 census ===
As of the 2020 census, Cleary had a population of 1,688. The median age was 44.1 years. 21.2% of residents were under the age of 18 and 21.6% of residents were 65 years of age or older. For every 100 females there were 101.0 males, and for every 100 females age 18 and over there were 94.4 males age 18 and over.

0.0% of residents lived in urban areas, while 100.0% lived in rural areas.

There were 693 households in Cleary, of which 33.5% had children under the age of 18 living in them. Of all households, 53.0% were married-couple households, 19.9% were households with a male householder and no spouse or partner present, and 24.5% were households with a female householder and no spouse or partner present. About 25.5% of all households were made up of individuals and 14.0% had someone living alone who was 65 years of age or older.

There were 718 housing units, of which 3.5% were vacant. The homeowner vacancy rate was 0.2% and the rental vacancy rate was 11.0%.
