= Richland, Mississippi =

- City
- City of Richland
- Richland Water Tower reads "City of Richland, Home of the Rangers"

- Flag Logo
- Mottoes: "Proud to Call it Home!", "An Excellent Choice"
- Location of Richland, Mississippi

- Location of Richland in the US
- Coordinates: 32°13′47″N 90°9′35″W
- Country: United States
- State: Mississippi
- County: Rankin
- District: 1
- Incorporated: October 31, 1974; 51 years ago

Government
  - Type: Mayor–Council
  - Mayor: Clay Burns (I)
  - Board of Aldermen: Clay Burns; Robert Craft; Beth Sanford; Gus Black; Cathey Wynne

Area
  - Total: 12.59 sq mi (32.61 km^{2})
  - Land: 12.53 sq mi (32.44 km^{2})
  - Water: 0.066 sq mi (0.17 km^{2})
- Elevation: 266 ft (81 m)

Population (2020)
  - Total: 7,137
  - Density: 569.8/sq mi (220.01/km^{2})
- Time zone: UTC-6 (Central (CST))
  - Summer (DST): UTC-5 (CDT)
- ZIP code(s): 39218
- Area code(s): 601
- FIPS code: 28-62400
- GNIS feature ID: 690674
- Major airport: JAN
- Website: richlandms.org

Richland is a city in Rankin County, Mississippi, United States. The population was 7,137 at the 2020 census. A suburb of Jackson, Richland is part of the Jackson Metropolitan Statistical Area, and is located southeast of the state capital.

== Geography ==
Richland is located at 32°13′47″N 90°9′35″W (32.229844, -90.159724). According to the United States Census Bureau, the city has a total area of 12.2 square miles (32 km^{2}), of which 12.2 square miles (32 km^{2}) is land and 0.04-square-mile (0.10 km^{2}) (0.16%) is water.

== Demographics ==
Historical population
Census	Pop.	Note	%±
1980	3,955		—
1990	4,014		1.5%
2000	6,027		50.1%
2010	6,912		14.7%
2020	7,137		3.3%
U.S. Decennial Census

=== 2020 census ===
As of the 2020 census, Richland had a population of 7,137. The median age was 36.5 years. 25.3% of residents were under the age of 18 and 14.3% were 65 years of age or older. For every 100 females there were 91.2 males, and for every 100 females age 18 and over there were 89.4 males.

92.8% of residents lived in urban areas, while 7.2% lived in rural areas.

There were 2,697 households in Richland, including 1,888 families. Of households, 37.2% had children under the age of 18 living in them. Among family households, 45.1% were married-couple households, 17.9% were households with a male householder and no spouse or partner present, and 31.3% were households with a female householder and no spouse or partner present. About 23.7% of all households were made up of individuals, and 9.7% had someone living alone who was 65 years of age or older.

There were 2,942 housing units, of which 8.3% were vacant. The homeowner vacancy rate was 1.8% and the rental vacancy rate was 10.1%.

Richland racial composition
Race	Num.	Perc.
White (non-Hispanic)	4,776	66.92%
Black or African American (non-Hispanic)	1,419	19.88%
Native American	3	0.04%
Asian	163	2.28%
Pacific Islander	3	0.04%
Other/Mixed	176	2.47%
Hispanic or Latino	597	8.36%

=== 2000 census ===
As of the census of 2000, there were 6,027 people, 2,303 households, and 1,688 families residing in the city. The population density was 492.7 inhabitants per square mile (190.2/km^{2}). There were 2,540 housing units at an average density of 207.6 per square mile (80.2/km^{2}). The racial makeup of the city was 60% White, 40% African American, 0.08% Native American, 1.51% Asian, 0.02% Pacific Islander, 0.20% from other races, and 0.95% from two or more races. Hispanic or Latino of any race were 0.88% of the population.

There were 2,303 households, out of which 37.5% had children under the age of 18 living with them, 54.8% were married couples living together, 13.4% had a female householder with no husband present, and 26.7% were non-families. 21.8% of all households were made up of individuals, and 6.8% had someone living alone who was 65 years of age or older. The average household size was 2.62 and the average family size was 3.05.

In the city, the population was spread out, with 27.3% under the age of 18, 9.8% from 18 to 24, 33.6% from 25 to 44, 20.1% from 45 to 64, and 9.3% who were 65 years of age or older. The median age was 32 years. For every 100 females, there were 98.2 males. For every 100 females age 18 and over, there were 94.0 males.

The median income for a household in the city was $38,996, and the median income for a family was $44,800. Males had a median income of $32,377 versus $22,700 for females. The per capita income for the city was $17,574. About 8.3% of families and 10.4% of the population were below the poverty line, including 11.2% of those under age 18 and 19.8% of those age 65 or over.

== Government ==
The Mayor of Richland is former three-term alderman Clay Burns, who was elected in a 2024 special election following the resignation of the past mayor.

== Education ==
The three public schools in Richland are operated by the Rankin County School District.

== Notable person ==
- Lester Spell, Mississippi Commissioner of Agriculture and Commerce from 1996 to 2012

== See also ==
- List of municipalities in Mississippi
- National Register of Historic Places listings in Rankin County, Mississippi
