= Rankin County, Mississippi =

County in Mississippi, United States

- County
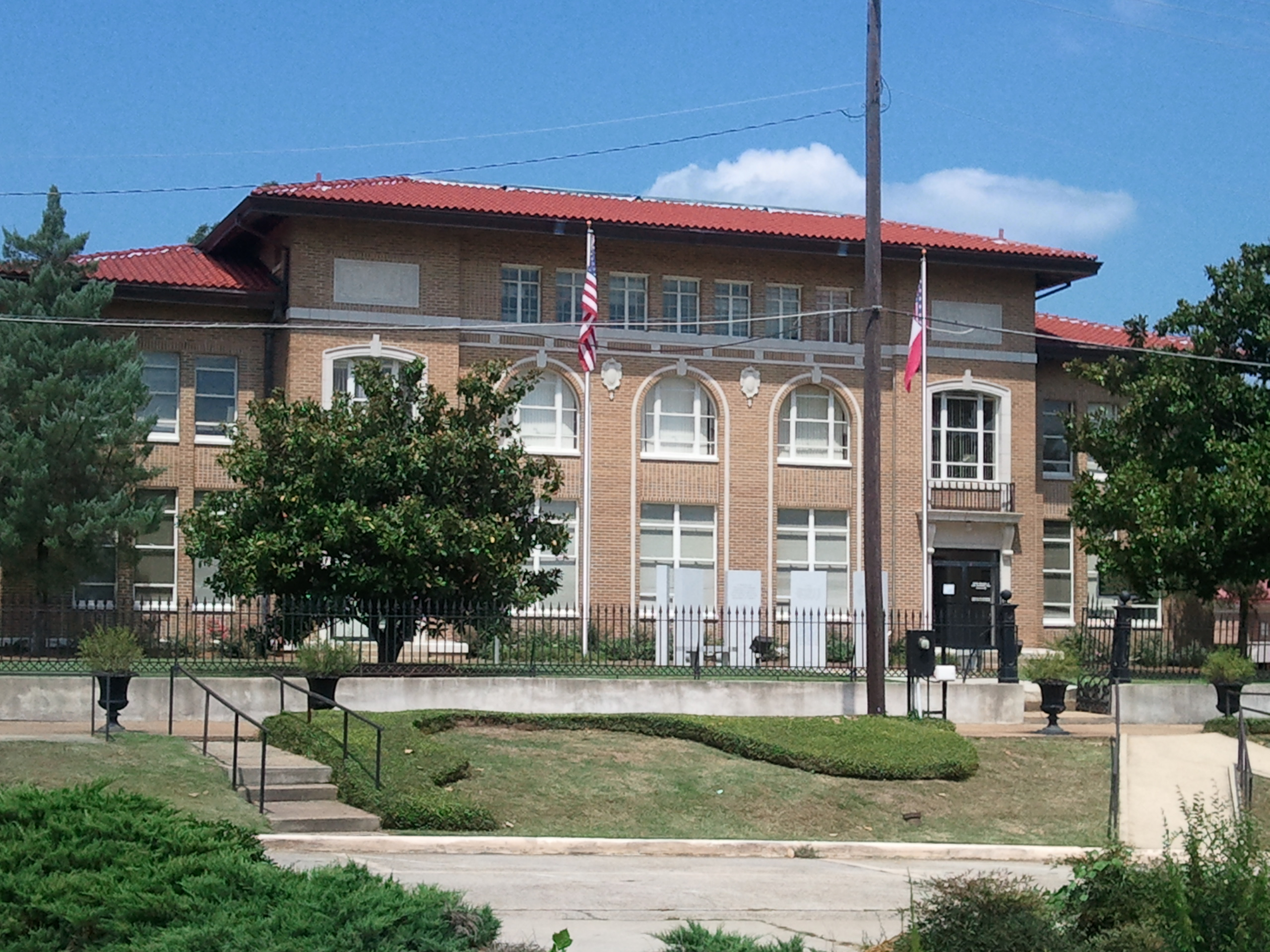
- Rankin County Courthouse in Brandon

- Location within the U.S. state of Mississippi
- Coordinates: 32°16′N 89°57′W
- Country: United States
- State: Mississippi
- Founded: February 4, 1828
- Named for: Christopher Rankin
- Seat: Brandon
- Largest city: Pearl

Area
  - Total: 806 sq mi (2,090 km^{2})
  - Land: 775 sq mi (2,010 km^{2})
  - Water: 31 sq mi (80 km^{2}) 3.8%

Population (2020)
  - Total: 157,031
  - Estimate (2025): 162,181 ▲
  - Density: 203/sq mi (78.2/km^{2})
- Time zone: UTC−6 (Central)
  - Summer (DST): UTC−5 (CDT)
- Congressional district: 3rd
- Website: www.rankincounty.org

Rankin County is a county located in the U.S. state of Mississippi. The western border of the county is formed by the Pearl River. As of the 2020 census, the population was 157,031, making it the fourth-most populous county in Mississippi. The county seat is Brandon, and the largest city is Pearl. The county is named in honor of Christopher Rankin, a Mississippi Congressman who served from 1819 to 1826.

Rankin County is part of the Jackson Metropolitan Statistical Area. The county includes several of the Jackson metropolitan area's eastern suburbs, including Pearl, Brandon, Flowood, Richland, and Florence.

== History ==
=== Formation and early settlement ===
Rankin County was established on February 4, 1828, from the portion of Hinds County lying east of the Pearl River. It was named for Christopher Rankin, a Mississippi congressman who served from 1819 to 1826. The county lies in central Mississippi, east of the Pearl River, and is bordered by Madison, Scott, Smith, Simpson, and Hinds counties.

One of the county's early settlements was Richmond, located on the east side of the Pearl River. The settlement later disappeared, and the site returned to cultivation. Brandon, named for Mississippi governor Gerard Brandon, was selected as the county seat and became an important early trading point in the area.

=== Antebellum agriculture and society ===
Rankin County's population grew from 2,083 in 1830 to 13,635 by 1860. In 1860, enslaved people made up 52 percent of the county's population. The county's economy was based largely on mixed agriculture, with farmers growing cotton, corn, rice, and potatoes while also raising livestock.

By 1860, Rankin County also had small-scale industry, including lumber mills, flour mills, and other enterprises. That year, the county had eighteen churches, most of them Baptist or Methodist congregations.

=== Education and 19th-century civic life ===
Education became part of Rankin County's early civic development. The Brandon Male and Female Academy was reorganized in 1849 as Brandon College and later became Brandon Female College. Frank Johnson served as principal of the school until her death in 1897.

Several figures associated with Rankin County became prominent in Mississippi's political and cultural history. Brandon attorney Robert Lowry became a Confederate brigadier general, state legislator, and governor of Mississippi from 1882 to 1890. Samuel Alfred Beadle, who had been born enslaved in Georgia, moved to Rankin County, studied law, and in 1884 became one of the few African Americans in Mississippi admitted to the bar.

=== Late 19th and early 20th centuries ===
After the Civil War, Rankin County remained largely agricultural. Its population reached 16,752 in 1880 and nearly 21,000 by 1900. During this period, African Americans made up about 60 percent of the county's population, though land ownership rates differed sharply by race. More than 70 percent of white farmers owned their land, compared with a much smaller share of Black farmers.

In 1909, educator Laurence C. Jones founded the Piney Woods Country Life School near the Simpson County line. The school was established to educate African American students in a rural setting and remains one of Rankin County's best-known institutions.

Rankin County also produced or was associated with several notable cultural figures during the early 20th century, including musician and fife maker Othar Turner, blues musician Elmore James, and football player Bruiser Kinard.

=== Whitfield and changing economy ===
In the 1920s, Mississippi moved the state mental hospital from Jackson to Rankin County. The community where the institution was located was renamed Whitfield in honor of Rankin County native Henry L. Whitfield, who served as governor of Mississippi from 1924 to 1927.

Between 1930 and 1960, Rankin County's population increased to 34,322. During that period, the county's economy began shifting away from agriculture. By 1960, nearly one-quarter of Rankin County workers were employed in industry, especially furniture and timber, and more than 1,000 residents worked in hospitals and health care. Farming remained present, but farmers made up only 13 percent of the county workforce by 1960.

=== Suburban growth ===
Rankin County grew rapidly during the second half of the 20th century as part of the eastern suburban expansion of the Jackson metropolitan area. The county's population increased from 34,322 in 1960 to 43,933 in 1970 and 69,427 in 1980. By 2010, Rankin County's population had reached 141,617, an increase of more than 300 percent since 1960.

Growth was concentrated in communities such as Pearl, Brandon, Flowood, Richland, and Florence. As the county developed, it retained rural areas while also becoming one of the primary suburban counties in the Jackson metropolitan area. As of the 2020 census, Rankin County had a population of 157,031, making it the fourth-most populous county in Mississippi.

In 2026, Star officially incorporated after a Rankin County judge approved the decision, ending a decades-long effort by residents to form a town government.

== Geography ==
According to the U.S. Census Bureau, the county has a total area of 806 square miles (2,090 km^{2}), of which 775 square miles (2,010 km^{2}) is land and 31 square miles (80 km^{2}) (3.8%) is water.

=== Adjacent counties ===
- Madison County (north)
- Scott County (east)
- Smith County (southeast)
- Simpson County (south)
- Hinds County (west)

== Demographics ==
Historical population
Census	Pop.	Note	%±
1830	2,083		—
1840	4,631		122.3%
1850	7,227		56.1%
1860	13,635		88.7%
1870	12,977		−4.8%
1880	16,752		29.1%
1890	17,922		7.0%
1900	20,955		16.9%
1910	23,944		14.3%
1920	20,272		−15.3%
1930	20,353		0.4%
1940	27,934		37.2%
1950	28,881		3.4%
1960	34,322		18.8%
1970	43,933		28.0%
1980	69,427		58.0%
1990	87,161		25.5%
2000	115,327		32.3%
2010	141,617		22.8%
2020	157,031		10.9%
2025 (est.)	162,181	▲	3.3%
U.S. Decennial Census; 1790-1960 1900-1990; 1990-2000 2010-2019

=== Racial and ethnic composition ===
Rankin County, Mississippi – Racial and ethnic composition Note: the US Census treats Hispanic/Latino as an ethnic category. This table excludes Latinos from the racial categories and assigns them to a separate category. Hispanics/Latinos may be of any race.
Race / Ethnicity (NH = Non-Hispanic)	Pop 1980	Pop 1990	Pop 2000	Pop 2010	Pop 2020	% 1980	% 1990	% 2000	% 2010	% 2020
White alone (NH)	55,990	71,683	92,552	108,086	111,990	80.65%	82.24%	80.25%	76.32%	71.32%
Black or African American alone (NH)	12,813	14,573	19,669	26,519	32,430	18.46%	16.72%	17.05%	18.73%	20.65%
Native American or Alaska Native alone (NH)	50	70	184	227	255	0.07%	0.08%	0.16%	0.16%	0.16%
Asian alone (NH)	105	304	754	1,574	2,260	0.15%	0.35%	0.65%	1.11%	1.44%
Native Hawaiian or Pacific Islander alone (NH)	x	x	22	91	94	x	x	0.02%	0.06%	0.06%
Other race alone (NH)	16	11	47	91	447	0.02%	0.01%	0.04%	0.06%	0.28%
Mixed race or Multiracial (NH)	x	x	579	1,234	4,488	x	x	0.50%	0.87%	2.86%
Hispanic or Latino (any race)	453	520	1,520	3,795	5,067	0.65%	0.60%	1.32%	2.68%	3.23%
Total	69,427	87,161	115,327	141,617	157,031	100.00%	100.00%	100.00%	100.00%	100.00%

=== 2020 census ===
As of the 2020 census, the county had a population of 157,031. The median age was 38.5 years. 23.4% of residents were under the age of 18 and 15.8% of residents were 65 years of age or older. For every 100 females there were 93.6 males, and for every 100 females age 18 and over there were 90.4 males age 18 and over.

The racial makeup of the county was 71.9% White, 20.7% Black or African American, 0.2% American Indian and Alaska Native, 1.4% Asian, 0.1% Native Hawaiian and Pacific Islander, 1.8% from some other race, and 3.9% from two or more races. Hispanic or Latino residents of any race comprised 3.2% of the population.

67.0% of residents lived in urban areas, while 33.0% lived in rural areas.

There were 59,626 households in the county, of which 34.1% had children under the age of 18 living in them. Of all households, 51.0% were married-couple households, 15.7% were households with a male householder and no spouse or partner present, and 28.6% were households with a female householder and no spouse or partner present. About 25.5% of all households were made up of individuals and 10.2% had someone living alone who was 65 years of age or older.

There were 63,611 housing units, of which 6.3% were vacant. Among occupied housing units, 75.0% were owner-occupied and 25.0% were renter-occupied. The homeowner vacancy rate was 1.4% and the rental vacancy rate was 7.9%.

== Economy ==
Rankin County's economy is tied to the Jackson metropolitan area, transportation corridors, retail, health care, education, manufacturing, and state government facilities. Economic development activity is concentrated in areas such as Pearl, Flowood, Brandon, and the West Rankin Industrial Park.

In 2026, Siemens Energy announced plans to construct a new manufacturing facility at West Rankin Industrial Park in Pearl. The Mississippi Development Authority said the project represented an investment of up to $300 million and was expected to create up to 300 advanced manufacturing jobs. The facility was planned to produce electrical grid components and increase Siemens Energy's production capacity in Rankin County.

Rankin First Economic Development Authority has identified business attraction, retention and expansion, workforce and site development, legislative advocacy, and tourism as focus areas for county economic development.

In 2025, the Jackson City Council approved a settlement allowing Pearl and Flowood to annex Jackson-owned but unincorporated land near Jackson–Medgar Wiley Evers International Airport. Mississippi Today reported that the agreement was expected to clear the way for economic development around airport-owned land and that Pearl and Flowood would provide services in their incorporated areas and collect property and sales tax revenue generated there.

== Sports and events ==
Trustmark Park in Pearl opened in 2005 as the home of the Mississippi Braves, the Double-A Minor League Baseball affiliate of the Atlanta Braves. The Braves played at Trustmark Park from 2005 through 2024 before relocating to Columbus, Georgia, where they became the Columbus Clingstones.

The Mississippi Mud Monsters of the Frontier League, an MLB Partner League, began play at Trustmark Park in 2025, continuing professional baseball in Rankin County after the departure of the Mississippi Braves.

Trustmark Park also hosts college baseball and community events. The 2026 Mississippi Farm Bureau Governor's Cup between Mississippi State and Ole Miss drew 8,223 fans and was announced as a sellout. In 2026, Trustmark Park was selected to host the MLB HBCU Power Series, a multi-day HBCU baseball showcase held in conjunction with Major League Baseball. The event was scheduled for February 12–15 and included Texas Southern, Prairie View A&M, Alabama A&M, Grambling State, Jackson State, and Alcorn State.

In 2025, Trustmark Park hosted Main Street Pearl's Oktoberfest during the day and MonstoBEERfest, a ticketed beer festival, that evening. Later that year, Trustmark Park hosted The Southern Lights, a walk-through holiday attraction featuring more than 2.5 million lights, real-ice skating, fire pits, and train rides.

In September 2025, the Mud Monsters announced that Trustmark Park would replace its infield dirt and grass with synthetic turf. The organization said Spectrum Entertainment would install Major Play Matrix synthetic turf covering more than 40,000 square feet. Mud Monsters general manager Andrew Seymour said the new infield would help reduce rain delays and make the venue more usable for concerts, showcases, and community events.

== Transportation ==
=== Major highways ===
- Interstate 20
- Interstate 55
- U.S. Highway 80
- U.S. Highway 49
- Mississippi Highway 13
- Mississippi Highway 18
- Mississippi Highway 25
- Mississippi Highway 43
- Mississippi Highway 149
- Mississippi Highway 468
- Mississippi Highway 469
- Mississippi Highway 471
- Mississippi Highway 475
- Mississippi Highway 477
- Mississippi Highway 481

The West Rankin Parkway opened in November 2025, connecting U.S. Highway 80 in Pearl to Flowood Drive in Flowood. Local officials said the parkway could support future economic development because of nearby land, rail access, and interstate access.

=== Airport ===
Jackson–Medgar Wiley Evers International Airport is located in unincorporated Rankin County.

== Government ==
The Mississippi Department of Corrections (MDOC) operates the Central Mississippi Correctional Facility (CMCF), located in unincorporated Rankin County. CMCF houses the state's female death row inmates. MDOC also operates the Brandon Probation and Parole Office in Brandon. In 2007 the Mississippi Highway Patrol opened a driver's license facility across the highway from the prison.

The Mississippi State Hospital of the Mississippi Department of Mental Health is in Whitfield in unincorporated Rankin County. It occupies the former Rankin Farm prison grounds. In 1935, the Mississippi State Insane Asylum moved from a complex of 19th-century buildings in northern Jackson, the capital, to its existing location.

The Mississippi Department of Environmental Quality operates the Central Regional Office and the MDEQ Laboratory in unincorporated Rankin County.

== Politics ==
Since 1964, Republican presidential candidates have carried Rankin County in every election except 1968, when George Wallace won the county as the American Independent Party candidate.

United States presidential election results for Rankin County, Mississippi
Year	Republican		Democratic		Third party(ies)	
Year	No.	%	No.	%	No.	%
1912	7	0.92%	718	93.86%	40	5.23%
1916	8	0.71%	1,104	98.22%	12	1.07%
1920	43	4.51%	905	94.96%	5	0.52%
1924	34	2.35%	1,415	97.65%	0	0.00%
1928	180	11.96%	1,325	88.04%	0	0.00%
1932	52	3.27%	1,536	96.60%	2	0.13%
1936	54	2.78%	1,884	97.06%	3	0.15%
1940	35	1.63%	2,110	98.09%	6	0.28%
1944	98	3.96%	2,374	96.04%	0	0.00%
1948	23	0.83%	57	2.07%	2,679	97.10%
1952	1,545	42.66%	2,077	57.34%	0	0.00%
1956	556	18.00%	1,537	49.76%	996	32.24%
1960	818	17.11%	850	17.77%	3,114	65.12%
1964	7,541	95.78%	332	4.22%	0	0.00%
1968	1,124	9.12%	1,975	16.03%	9,224	74.85%
1972	12,187	85.19%	1,913	13.37%	205	1.43%
1976	11,507	60.95%	6,937	36.75%	434	2.30%
1980	16,650	66.25%	8,047	32.02%	435	1.73%
1984	22,393	79.10%	5,874	20.75%	41	0.14%
1988	22,937	78.41%	6,201	21.20%	116	0.40%
1992	24,537	67.76%	8,155	22.52%	3,518	9.72%
1996	24,585	69.40%	8,614	24.32%	2,224	6.28%
2000	32,983	79.60%	8,050	19.43%	402	0.97%
2004	43,054	78.68%	11,005	20.11%	658	1.20%
2008	48,140	76.29%	14,372	22.78%	591	0.94%
2012	48,444	75.52%	14,988	23.37%	713	1.11%
2016	47,178	75.16%	14,110	22.48%	1,480	2.36%
2020	50,895	72.03%	18,847	26.67%	913	1.29%
2024	50,896	73.04%	18,060	25.92%	722	1.04%

=== Law enforcement ===
The Mississippi Department of Public Safety operates the Mississippi Law Enforcement Officers' Training Academy (MLEOTA) on a 243-acre (98 ha) property in Rankin County, near CMCF and the MSH, 10 miles (16 km) from Jackson.

A 2025 investigation by The New York Times reported allegations of violence and inmate abuse at the Rankin County jail.

==== Department of Justice torture investigation ====
In February 2023, the Department of Justice opened a civil rights investigation into conduct of the Rankin County Sheriff's Department. The investigation centered on a January 24, 2023, incident in which deputies searched the house of Michael Jenkins and Eddie Parker. Jenkins and Parker, both African Americans, experienced six deputies turning off their body cameras, torturing the men for two hours, shocking them with tasers, repeatedly shouting racial slurs, and shooting one of them in the mouth. All accused officers pled guilty and were convicted.

In June 2023, Jenkins and Parker filed a $400 million lawsuit against Sheriff Bryan Bailey and six deputies. In late June, the sheriff announced that some deputies involved had been terminated or had resigned, and that the department had hired a compliance officer to monitor daily operations. An investigation by the Associated Press determined that the Sheriff's Special Response Team had been involved in four violent incidents with African Americans since 2019, resulting in two deaths.

== Notable institutions ==
Rankin County is home to the Piney Woods Country Life School, founded in 1909 by Laurence C. Jones to educate African American students in a rural setting. The county is also home to Mississippi State Hospital at Whitfield, which moved from Jackson to Rankin County in the 1920s.

The county includes Jackson–Medgar Wiley Evers International Airport, located in unincorporated Rankin County, and Trustmark Park in Pearl, a professional baseball venue that opened in 2005.

== Communities ==
=== Cities ===
- Brandon (county seat)
- Florence
- Flowood
- Jackson (mostly in Hinds County, also in Madison County)
- Pearl
- Richland

=== Towns ===
- Pelahatchie
- Star

=== Village ===
- Puckett

=== Census-designated places ===
- Cleary
- Robinhood

=== Other unincorporated communities ===
- Anse
- Cross Roads
- Fannin
- Goshen Springs
- Greenfield
- Gulde
- Johns
- Koch
- Langford
- Leesburg
- Monterey
- Piney Woods
- Pisgah
- Sand Hill
- Whitfield
- Woodlake

=== Former communities ===
- Comeby
- Dobson
- Lynwood

== Education ==
Public school students in Rankin County are served primarily by two school districts: the Rankin County School District and the Pearl Public School District. Pearl Public School District serves the city of Pearl, while Rankin County School District serves most other areas of the county, including Brandon, Florence, Flowood, Pelahatchie, Puckett, Richland, Sand Hill, and Star.

The Rankin County School District is one of the largest public school districts in Mississippi. Its schools are organized into attendance zones serving communities across the county, including Brandon, Florence, McLaurin, Northwest Rankin, Pelahatchie, Pisgah, Puckett, and Richland. The Pearl Public School District operates public schools within Pearl, including Pearl High School, Pearl Junior High School, Pearl Upper Elementary, Pearl Lower Elementary, and Northside Elementary.

Rankin County is part of the Hinds Community College district. The college's Rankin Campus is located in Pearl, off U.S. Highway 80. The campus opened in 1983 as a commuter campus. In 2026, Hinds Community College broke ground on The Commons, a planned Rankin Campus facility that includes a 175-bed residence hall, food court plaza, health center, and gymnasium, with an expected opening in 2027.

Postsecondary and specialized education in the county also includes Academy of Hair Design-Pearl, a cosmetology school in Pearl.

Private and independent schools in Rankin County include Piney Woods Country Life School, Hartfield Academy in Flowood, Jackson Preparatory School in Flowood, Park Place Christian Academy in Pearl, East Rankin Academy in Pelahatchie, and Discovery Christian School in Florence.

== See also ==
- National Register of Historic Places listings in Rankin County, Mississippi
