= Cathedral of St. John the Divine =

Cathedral of the Episcopal Diocese of New York

- Cathedral Church of Saint John the Divine
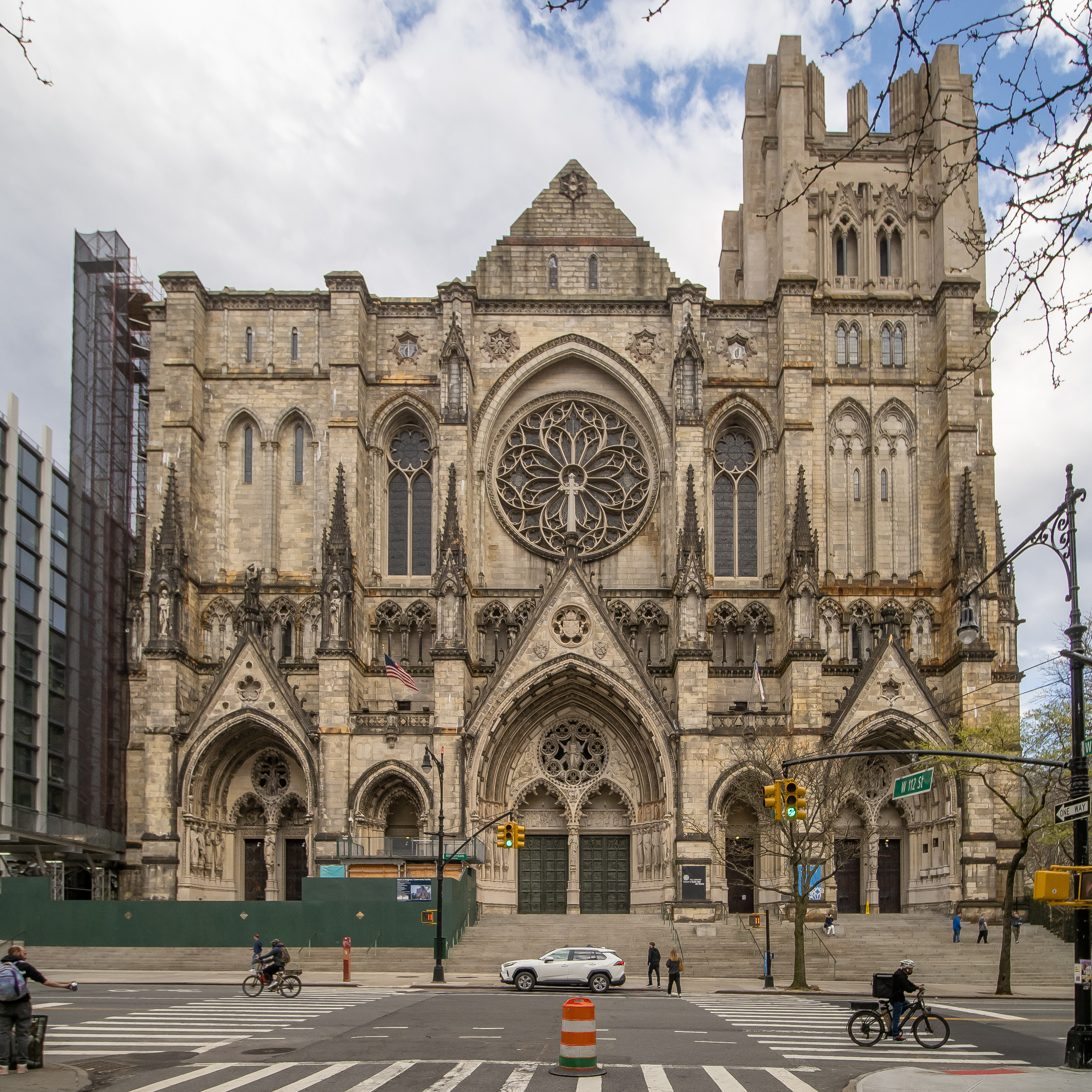
- Cathedral of St. John the Divine
- 40.803888°N 73.962080°W
- Location: 112th Street and 1047 Amsterdam Ave, Manhattan, New York City
- Country: United States
- Denomination: Episcopal Church
- Website: www.stjohndivine.org

History
- Founded: 1892; 134 years ago
- Founder: Henry Codman Potter
- Dedication: John the Divine
- Consecrated: November 30, 1941

Architecture
- Architect(s): Christopher Grant LaFarge and George Lewis Heins; Ralph Adams Cram
- Architectural type: Cathedral
- Style: Romanesque Revival, Gothic Revival
- Groundbreaking: December 27, 1892

Specifications
- Length: 601 feet (183 m)
- Width: 232 feet (71 m)
- Height: 124 feet (38 m)
- Materials: Stone, granite, limestone

Administration
- Province: Atlantic
- Diocese: New York
- Deanery: Manhattan North

Clergy
- Bishop: Matthew Heyd
- Vicar: Steven Y. Lee
- Dean: Winnie Varghese

New York City Landmark
- Official name: Cathedral Church of Saint John the Divine and the Cathedral Close
- Type: New York City Landmark
- Designated: February 21, 2017
- Reference no.: 2585

The Cathedral of St. John the Divine (sometimes referred to as St. John's and also nicknamed St. John the Unfinished) is the cathedral of the Episcopal Diocese of New York. It is at 1047 Amsterdam Avenue in the Morningside Heights neighborhood of Manhattan in New York City, between West 110th Street (also known as Cathedral Parkway) and West 113th Street.

The cathedral is an unfinished building, with only two-thirds of the proposed building completed, due to several major stylistic changes, work interruptions, and unstable ground on the site. In 1892 construction began on the original design, a synthesis of the Byzantine Revival and Romanesque Revival styles. After the opening of the crossing in 1909, the overall plan was changed to a Gothic Revival design. The completion of the nave was delayed until 1941 due to various funding shortfalls, and little progress has occurred since then, except for an addition to the tower at the nave's southwest corner. After a large fire damaged part of the cathedral in 2001, it was renovated and rededicated in 2008. The towers above the western elevation of the facade, the southern transept, and a proposed steeple above the crossing, have not been completed.

Despite being incomplete, the Cathedral of St. John the Divine is the largest church in North America, by some definitions the world's largest Protestant cathedral, and is the fourth-largest church by area among all Christian denominations. (Note: This distinction depends on which dimensions are considered. For a discussion on the matter of size, see Quirk 1993, pp. 15–16.) The floor area of St. John's is 121,000 sq ft (11,200 m^{2}), with a length of 601 feet (183 m), and the roof height of the nave is 177 feet (54 m). Since the cathedral's interior is so large, it has been used for hundreds of events and art exhibitions. In addition, the Cathedral of St. John the Divine has been involved in various advocacy initiatives throughout its history.

The cathedral close includes numerous buildings: the Leake & Watts Orphan Asylum building, the cathedral proper, St. Faith's House, the choir school, the deanery, and the bishop's house. The buildings are in different styles and were built at different times; the Leake & Watts Orphan Asylum predates the cathedral itself. The cathedral close was collectively designated an official city landmark by the New York City Landmarks Preservation Commission in 2017.

== History ==
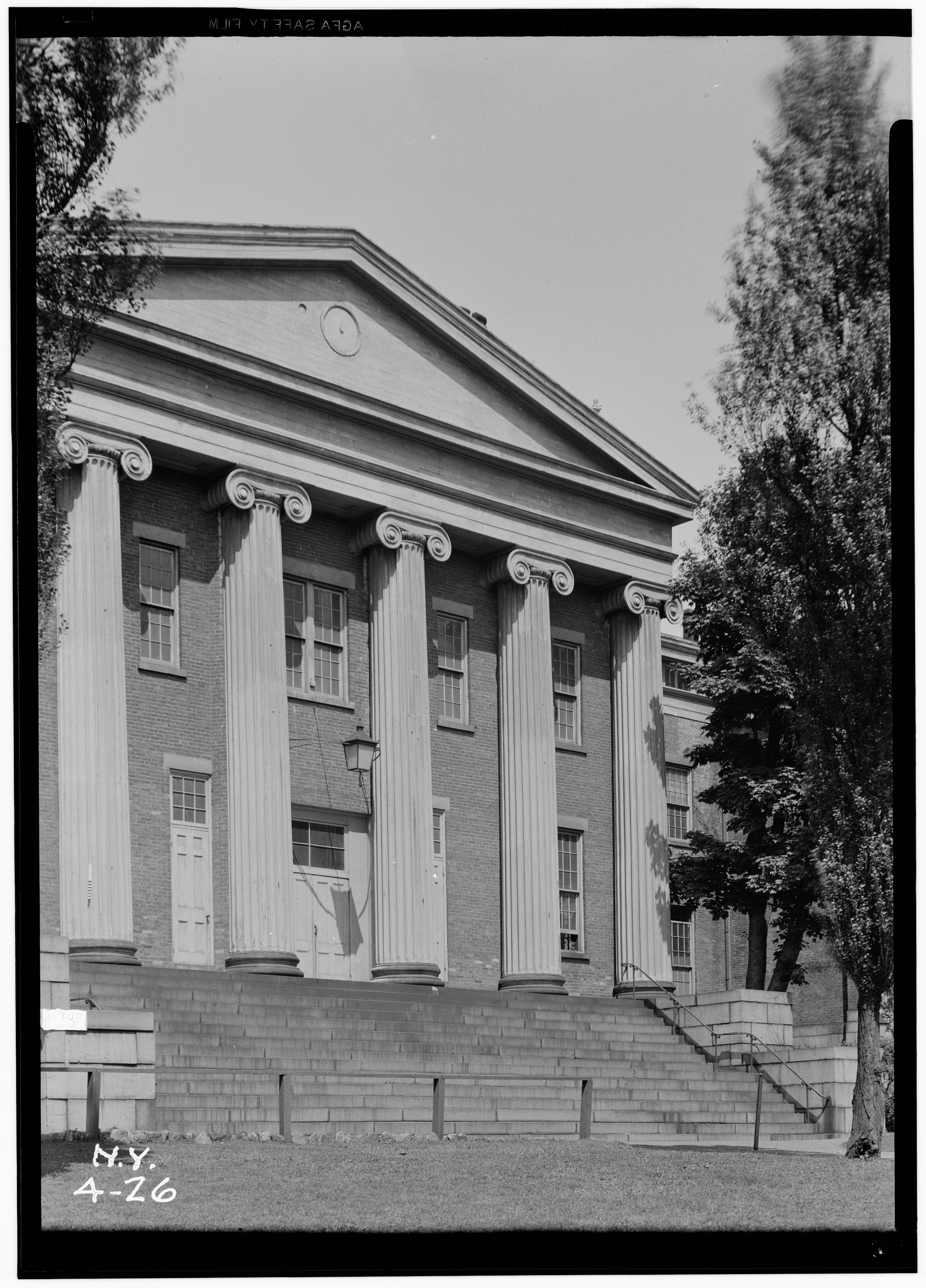
The Leake and Watts Orphanage, which is still located on the cathedral grounds

=== Context ===
==== Site ====
The neighborhood of Morningside Heights was thinly settled in the 17th century by the Dutch, then by the English. It remained rural through the mid-19th century, with two exceptions. The first was the Bloomingdale Insane Asylum, which opened in 1821 and moved to Westchester in 1889. The other was Leake and Watts Orphan Asylum, bounded by 110th Street to the south and 113th Street to the north, which later became the current cathedral site. The Leake and Watts asylum was incorporated in 1831 under act of the New York State Legislature, and three years later, 25 acres (10 ha) of land at the corner of Bloomingdale Road (now Broadway) and 110th Street was purchased from the Bloomingdale Asylum. The initial plans for the asylum were drawn up by Ithiel Town, but were revised several times to keep the costs within the asylum's budget. The cornerstone of the asylum was laid in 1838, and it was completed in 1843.

==== Need for a cathedral ====
Meanwhile, the Episcopal Diocese of New York started to grow in the early 19th century: there were 26 Episcopal parishes in the city by 1800, and a decade later, that number had nearly doubled to 50. In 1828, the first proposal for a grand cathedral for the diocese was made by Bishop John Henry Hobart, who proposed a site near Washington Square Park. The church would be called the Cathedral of St. John the Divine, or St. John's Cathedral for short, after the Revelation by John of Patmos (also called "John the Divine"). The plans were canceled because of objections over erecting such a large building for the diocese, a derivative of the Church of England, even as many New Yorkers still harbored resentment over the American Revolutionary War.

In 1873, a cathedral board of trustees was established under Bishop Horatio Potter. The board decided on property just south of Central Park, bounded by 59th Street to the north and 57th Street to the south. However, the purchase was canceled after the would-be donors lost their savings in the Panic of 1873. Yet another plot of land, at Eighth Avenue and 74th Street, was offered to the church in 1882, but rejected due to the high cost of acquisition. By 1890, there were 40,000 Episcopalians in Manhattan, and Episcopalians made up the largest bloc of Protestants in the borough. Furthermore, many imposing institutions were being built in New York City, such as the Metropolitan Museum of Art, Carnegie Hall, Metropolitan Opera House, and the American Museum of Natural History.

=== Planning ===
==== Site selection ====
When Henry C. Potter, Horatio Potter's nephew, became the Diocese of New York's assistant bishop in 1883, he convened the trustees to look for an alternative site. On June 1, 1887, Henry Potter publicly announced his intention to build St. John's, though the exact location was still to be determined. Potter described the planned cathedral as an "American Westminster Abbey" that would rival the Catholic St. Patrick's Cathedral in Midtown Manhattan. In his announcement, Potter called on New Yorkers to give funds toward the new cathedral, which was expected to cost $10 million. The plans for the cathedral were well received by both Protestants and non-Protestants, as well as the media and other denominational leaders. The donors included the wealthy Astor, Vanderbilt, and Belmont families. Additionally, the Barberini family's tapestries were gifted to the cathedral in 1891.

Numerous sites in Manhattan were examined for the new cathedral's location, and by 1889, the Leake and Watts Asylum between 110th and 113th Streets had been chosen as the site for the future site of St. John's. News media such as The New York Times and Uptown Visitor praised the decision, as the site was located on a high point overlooking Central and Morningside parks. The committee had wanted to build slightly further north, on a more elevated plot between 116th Street to the south and 119th Street to the north. However, that plot was too difficult to acquire, as its ownership was divided among several entities; by contrast, the Leake and Watts Asylum had full control over their entire city block. The 11.5-acre (4.7 ha) asylum site was deeded to the cathedral in October 1891, and the asylum moved to Westchester County, New York. The asylum site was then acquired for $850,000. At the time, Morningside Heights was quickly being developed as a residential neighborhood surrounded by numerous higher-education institutions. The proposed cathedral's elevated location would have been visible from New Jersey, across the Hudson River to the west, as well as from the New York Bay to the south.

==== Architecture competition ====
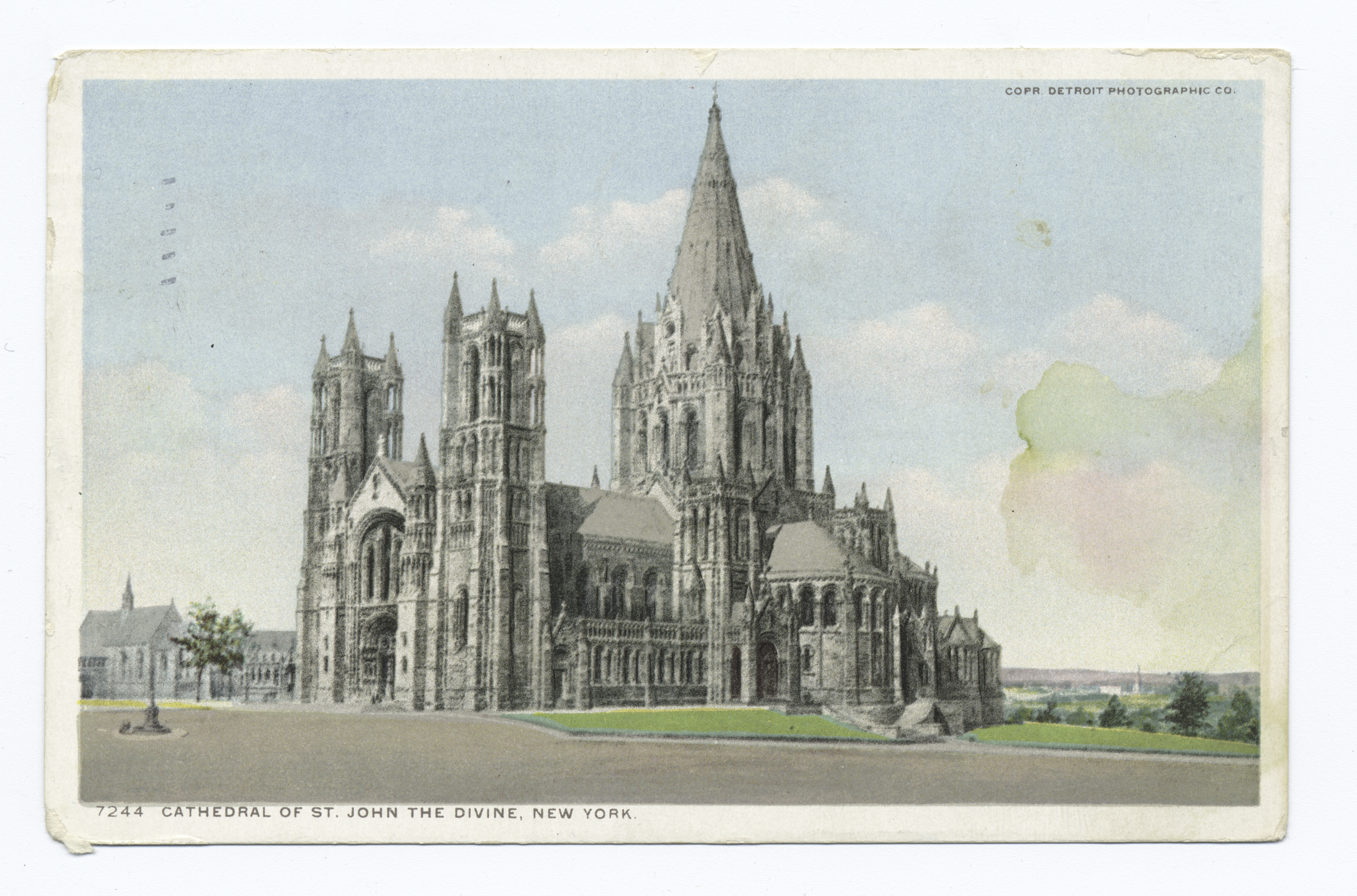
Architectural rendering of the cathedral's design for Heins & LaFarge, Architects (1891)

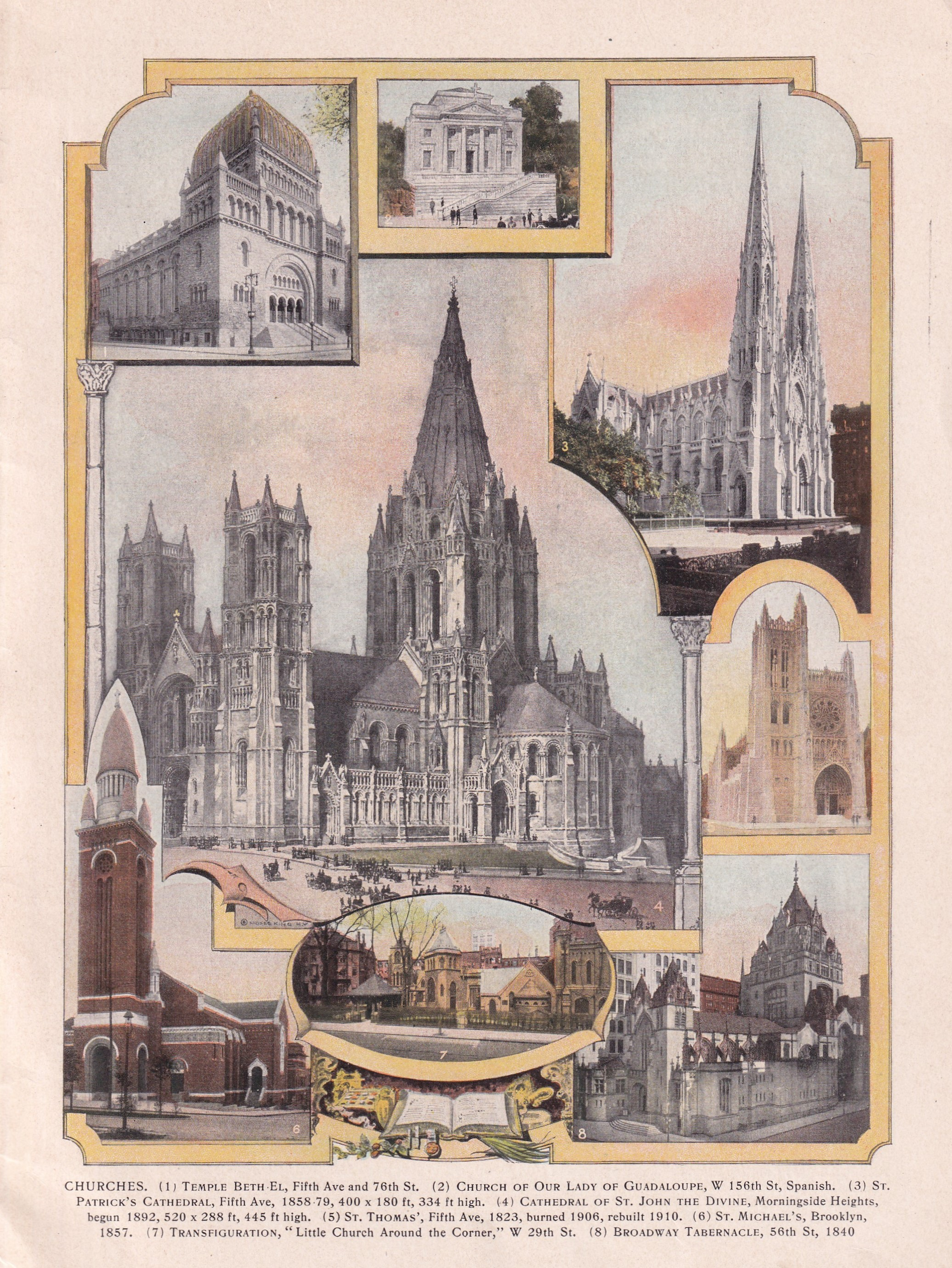
Cathedral of St. John the Divine in 1910

There was also debate over the new cathedral's style. Because of the larger plot and more remote location from Midtown Manhattan it was anticipated it could be more elaborate than St. Patrick's. The trustees had formed a Committee on Architecture in conjunction with William Robert Ware, a Columbia architecture professor, which held a design competition involving several prominent architectural firms. Though the competition had an open entry, fourteen selected architects were paid $500 each to create designs. The competition closed in January 1889.

In May 1889 the trustees formed a committee to review the more than 60 designs submitted. (Note: Sources differ over how many plans were submitted. The New York City Landmarks Preservation Commission states that 68 plans were submitted, but architectural writer Robert A. M. Stern writes that 66 plans were submitted.) Many entrants were American, though only four were experienced in cathedral construction. The board members then discussed the designs privately; some architects expressed concerns about the secret consultations, since the trustees generally did not have professional knowledge of architecture. The entries were narrowed down to four finalists, namely, the "Gerona" by William A. Potter and R. H. Robertson; "Three Arabesque Scrolls within a Circle" by George L. Heins and Christopher Grant LaFarge with William Winthrop Kent (1860–1955), brother of Edward Austin Kent; "AMDG" by George M. Huss and J. H. Buck; and "Jerusalem the Golden" by William Halsey Wood. "Gerona" used the Gothic style based on Spanish cathedrals; "AMDG" and "Jerusalem the Golden" were in a regular Gothic style, and "Three Arabesque Scrolls" was mainly Byzantine.

Potter and Robertson were the only finalists with significant experience at the time, and the trustees had agreed not to release any designs without the consent of all competitors, although some contestants broke this agreement and revealed their designs to the media. The finalists were given more than a year to carry out further work their plans: the original deadline was set for February 1890, but was later extended to November after a failed proposal to host the World's Columbian Exposition in Morningside Park. The submissions were placed in public view in April 1891. By then, the public was losing interest in the competition, and the finalist designs mainly received negative criticism.

==== Plan selected ====
In July 1891, the plan-selection committee chose Heins & LaFarge's plan. This design had been the trustees' second choice but although the trustees liked Potter and Robertson's plan more, W. A. Potter was the bishop's half-brother and the trustees did not want to be accused of nepotism. To Kent's consternation, his work on the design initially received no recognition; it was acknowledged the following year. The design proposed an apse of radiating chapels apses; a square crossing defined by four round-headed arches, supporting a dome over which would rise a massive tower; and transepts with round edges. The interior was based upon Boston's Trinity Church, and the crossing was based upon Istanbul's Hagia Sophia, Venice's St. Mark's Basilica, and the Périgueux Cathedral. The "exotic" design was seen as an example of the unusual architecture that was prevalent at that time. It was also Heins & LaFarge's first major commission: the firm later designed structures such as the Astor Court buildings at the Bronx Zoo, as well as the early stations of the Interborough Rapid Transit Company, the first operator of the present-day New York City Subway.

That October, the trustees directed the firm to revise their design further. The following month, it was announced that work would begin in early 1892, provided that Heins & LaFarge submitted their revised plans that April. The original plans were then substantially revised because the board of trustees wanted a Gothic-style appearance. The western towers were modified to remove the spires and enlarge the windows, and various Gothic details were placed on the facade. The nave was realigned from north–south to east–west so that the apse would face east, in the direction of the sunrise, to represent the resurrection of Jesus as per Episcopal tradition. Heins & LaFarge objected to the realignment because it would result in the cathedral being hidden behind other buildings. In the final plan, "Three Arabesque Scrolls" incorporated both Byzantine and Romanesque influences, with Gothic detailing on the exterior. Outwardly, the design resembled the AMDG plan from Huss & Buck. By April 1892, the trustees had raised much of the $850,000 required for land acquisition, though there still remained a deficit of $175,000.

=== Construction and early years ===
Construction on the Cathedral of St. John the Divine was begun with the cornerstone-laying ceremony on December 27, 1892, St. John's Day. One thousand tickets for seats at the ceremony were distributed, though the actual attendance was 1,100. The cornerstone contained various objects such as a Bible and church papers. Potter hit the stone three times with a mallet and said "Other foundation can no man lay, than that is laid which is Jesus Christ." The following month, the remaining $175,000 for land acquisition had been secured, and the trustees moved to take title to the land, including the cathedral close around the cathedral's main building, in April. Unlike the main building, the cathedral close was not designed under a single master plan, and during the 1890s and 1900s, several proposals were made for the site.

==== Initial construction ====
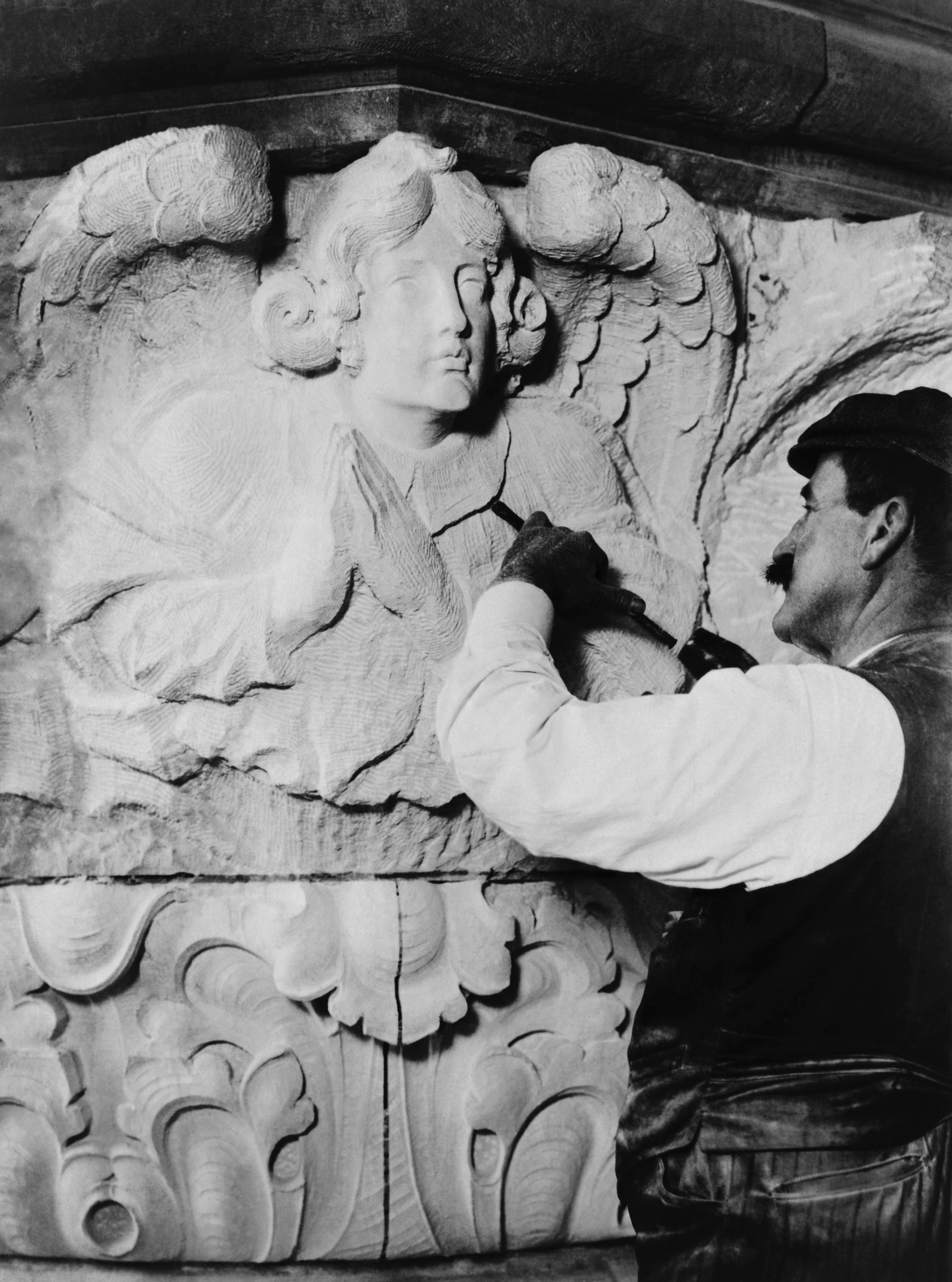
Stonemason finishing an angel, 1909

Construction work began in early 1893. The trustees initially expected that work would proceed quickly because much of the Morningside Heights plateau sat on shallow bedrock. However, in September 1893, builders unexpectedly hit pockets of soft shale, and a spring about 40 feet (12 m) below ground. One of these pockets was located directly below the site for one of the four massive piers that were to support the cathedral's 445-foot (136 m) stone tower. The trustees briefly considered moving the entire cathedral slightly southward. They decided against moving the cathedral, believing it to be inauspicious to move the cornerstone. Instead, builders drilled several shafts until they hit bedrock, then poured concrete pit piles within each shaft to accommodate the weight of the tower piers. The layer of bedrock was, in some cases, 72 feet (22 m) beneath ground level. The pits were completed in late 1895 at a significantly higher cost than originally estimated.

By 1898, St. John's had cost an estimated $750,000, and by an 1896 estimate the cathedral was projected to cost at least $5 million when complete. As a temporary measure, the Tiffany Chapel was purchased in mid-1898 and placed in the crypt in the basement; the church's first services were held there in January 1899. The crossing arches, located in the cathedral plot's eastern portion, were completed the following year, though three of the arches were temporarily sealed off until the transepts and nave could be completed. By then, some $2 million had already been spent, even though little appeared to have been completed. Despite large donations from prominent figures such as financiers John Jacob Astor IV and William Waldorf Astor, governor Levi P. Morton, banker J. P. Morgan, and businessman Cornelius Vanderbilt, the trustees continued to raise funds.

In March 1903, the trustees announced that the next stage of St. John's construction would require $500,000 for building the choir and $200,000 for completing the loft, and that eight massive granite columns would need to be procured to support the roof over the choir. Three more arches were to support the rest of the roof. Quarried in Vinalhaven, Maine, each column was 54 feet (16 m) tall with a 6-foot (1.8 m) diameter—at the time, the world's second-largest stone columns. (Note: The largest stone columns were those at Saint Isaac's Cathedral in the Russian city of Saint Petersburg.) Each column comprises two parts—a lower section 38 feet (12 m) tall and weighing 90 short tons (82 t), and the upper section of 17 feet (5.2 m) and weighing 40 short tons (36 t)—jointed so that the columns appear to be monoliths. Because of their size, three of the columns cracked while being turned. The columns were then transported using a specially constructed barge towed by the large steam tug Clara Clarita. When the columns arrived at Manhattan in July and August 1903, they were rolled onto flatbed trucks and brought to the cathedral site. The builders lacked a derrick strong enough to lift the column pieces, so they ordered wood to build one. The columns were lifted into position in July 1904, more than a year after the initial announcement; construction on the walls could not begin until the columns were in place. In 1903 construction of the crossing dome began, using relatively lightweight interlocking "Guastavino tiles" made of terracotta and patented by Spanish architect Rafael Guastavino. These were laid without centering or scaffolding in three layers, sandwiched with quick-drying cement, forming a shell of great strength in spite of the wide span. The 93-foot (28 m) diameter dome was completed in 15 weeks.

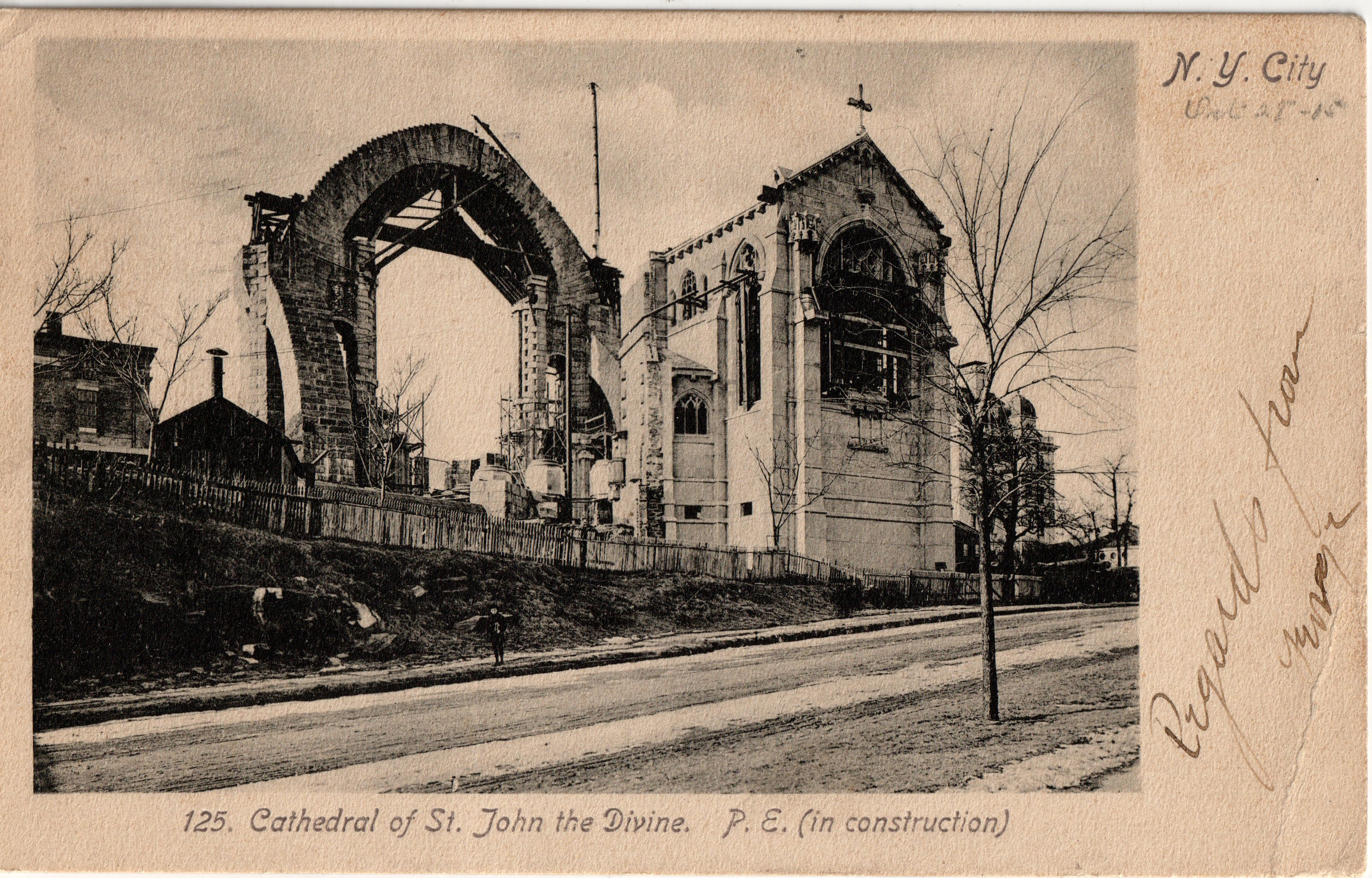
Cathedral of St John the Divine under construction, about 1905

The board of trustees implemented a new charter in early 1904, which provided for greater representation of laypeople on the board. By 1905, with $800,000 available for construction, the trustees anticipated that the cathedral would be completed within a decade. The church's great organ was ordered from Skinner the following year at a cost of $50,000 (equivalent to $1,790,000 in 2025), following a gift by the Morton family. It was almost completed by 1911 with nearly 7,000 pipes; the cost of the organ had risen to $70,000. Work also continued on the exterior walls of the choir and the seven surrounding chapels in the apse, which required 100,000 short tons (91,000 t) of granite. Builders estimated that 300,000 short tons (270,000 t) of stone would be in the walls once work was completed. Gutzon Borglum was commissioned for some of the sculptural elements, but his relation with the trustees was strained; he destroyed two angel sculptures after criticism of his work, and in 1906 threatened to quit. During the delays in construction, members of the public began to question the necessity of such a large cathedral, and public sentiment began to turn against the project. The trustees also started to doubt certain aspects of the plan, and criticized Heins & LaFarge for being understaffed, for their simultaneous involvement in many other projects, slow construction, and cost overruns.

==== Crossing opening and change in design ====
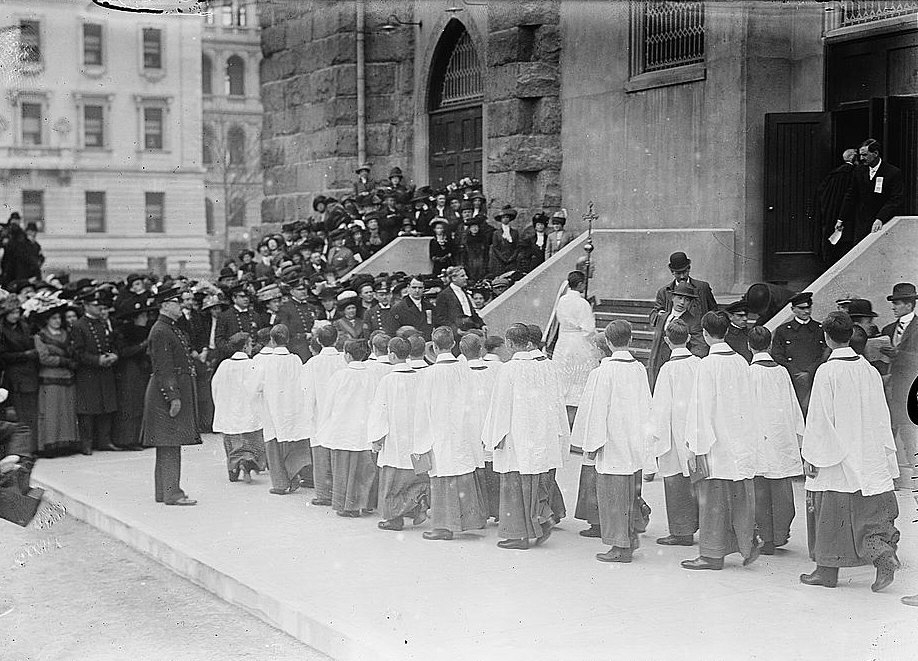
The consecration of the choir, April 19, 1911

Although Heins died in 1907, LaFarge continued to design the crossing, choir, and apse of St. John's. By then, the architectural preferences of the public were shifting away from the original design. Additionally, communication between LaFarge and the trustees were deteriorating, with several trustees calling for LaFarge's removal. The choir was covered in 1908, and the crossing was installed the next year. The choir was nearly complete by October 1909, but there were insufficient funds to complete its construction, delaying its opening by at least six months. At that time, St. John's was earning about $24,000 per year and had a $500,000 endowment, while at least $1 million was needed to complete construction. In March 1911, trustees finally confirmed an opening date of April 19, 1911. The first service in the choir and crossing, the consecration of the choir, occurred as scheduled on that day. The completed portions of the cathedral were widely praised, though few newspapers devoted extensive coverage to the event, except the New York Herald.

A month after the consecration of the choir, the trustees abruptly fired LaFarge, commissioning Ralph Adams Cram to take his place as lead architect of St. John's. The trustees exercised a clause in their contract with Heins & LaFarge, enabling them to hire another architect if either partner were to die. LaFarge had no notice of his dismissal, and was notified of it via a cable from his partner Benjamin Wistar Morris. The original Byzantine-Romanesque design was switched to a Gothic design, and Cram was asked to convert many existing features to Gothic style. The move was criticized in the local media, who claimed that the trustees and Cram had been conspiring to eject LaFarge from the lead architect position. However, The New York Sun reported that Cram had only reluctantly accepted the commission because the trustees had threatened to hire an overseas architect.

Cram presented a master plan for the cathedral close's buildings in October 1911, and his revised designs for the main structure were completed in 1913. Regardless, there was still not enough money to complete the cathedral's construction, as the New York Episcopal Diocese Cathedral League had mentioned in 1912 that $5.5 million was still needed. The diocese was able to construct several structures to the south of the main building (see § Cathedral close), as part of a plan that had been approved by the trustees in late 1911. These structures included the St. Faith's House (1909), Synod House (1911–1913), Cathedral School (1912–1913), and Cathedral House (1912–1914).

==== Nave and north transept ====
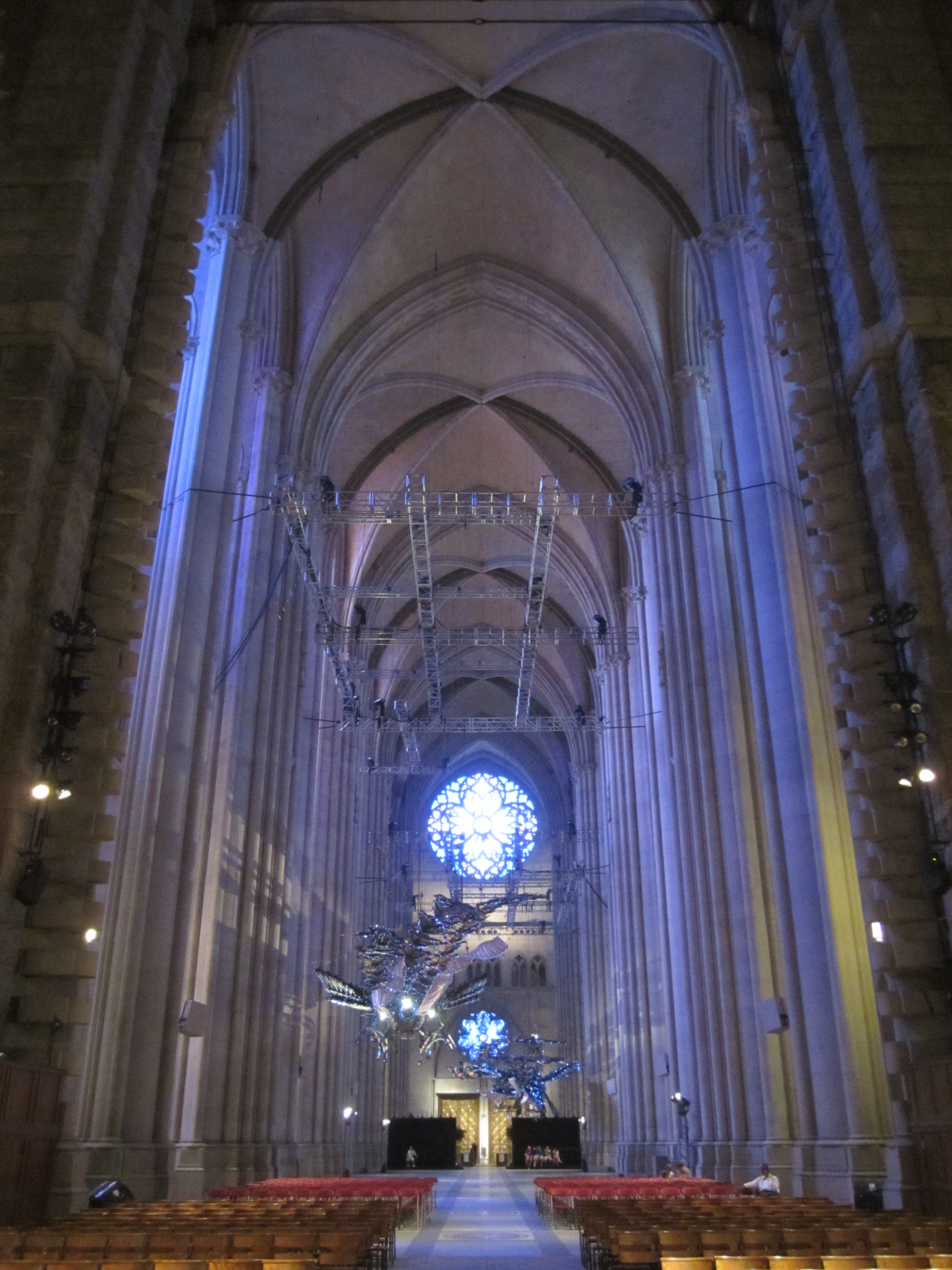
Interior of St. John's nave, facing west toward Amsterdam Avenue entrance

By January 1916, Bishop David H. Greer announced that the diocese would construct St. John's nave and narthex, along with a pair of towers on the western elevation of the facade above the narthex. The project was to cost $1.5 million, even though St. John's only had about $200,000 on hand as of June 1915. A groundbreaking ceremony for the nave was held on May 8, 1916. That November, construction stopped due to material and funding shortages during World War I, and the trustees had decided against raising funds until after the war. Cram edited his plans in the interim. In February 1919, the trustees approved Cram's revised plan to incorporate a memorial for soldiers. The new plans required $5–6 million, but would make St. John's the third- or fourth-largest worldwide. The cathedral did not yet have the money to build the nave, and in 1920 the trustees decided not to hold fundraising drives for it. Because of an unstable economy, work did not resume for another four years, though both Greer and Bishop Charles Sumner Burch supported the project.

In 1923, Burch's successor William T. Manning announced a $15 million capital campaign to raise money for this project. The New York campaign committee, headed by Franklin D. Roosevelt, campaigned from 1923 to 1925 to raise $6 million (equivalent to $113,000,000 in 2025). By May 1924, Manning announced that $2.5 million had been donated within the previous three months, and that work on the nave would soon begin if that rate of donation were to continue. St. John's was seeking price estimates for the nave's construction by that November, and the baptistery was donated the same year. Some $7.7 million had been raised by February 1925, and the laying of the nave's cornerstone occurred on November 9, 1925. Manning wanted the cathedral to be an interdenominational place of worship, but was still reluctant to add other denominations' members to the board of trustees. Notably, Manning rejected a request from John D. Rockefeller Jr., a Baptist, despite the latter's $500,000 donation toward the cathedral's building fund.

In January 1927, Manning announced that the trustees had approved Cram's proposal for a square tower above the crossing; the tower would replace the dome, which did not conform to the Gothic style. With sides of 60 feet (18 m), the tower would be half as wide as the arches below it. Cram's blueprint revisions, published in 1929, entailed building the 300-foot-tall (91 m) square tower over the crossing, and adding two portals to the western elevation. Additionally, St. John's northern transept began construction in December 1927. Since the funds for that transept were donated solely by women, it was called the Women's Transept. Work on the Women's Transept was halted in October 1930 due to a lack of funds. Construction at St. John's was otherwise unaffected by the Great Depression. During this duration, work was concentrated mainly on the western elevation.

When construction of the Women's Transept resumed in 1934, the nave and the western elevation were nearly complete except for the two towers above the western facade, but work on the crossing tower and south transept had yet to commence. By 1938, the nave was completed, but the temporary construction wall between the nave and crossing was still in place because the Byzantine-Romanesque crossing's design had yet to be harmonized with the Gothic nave. As such, Cram subsequently replaced the portions of the ceiling above the choir and the apse's eastern section. Additionally, the nave started to be used for services, even though it had not yet been dedicated. The 1939 WPA Guide to New York City stated that $20 million had been spent on the cathedral by then.

=== Full-length opening and expansion ===
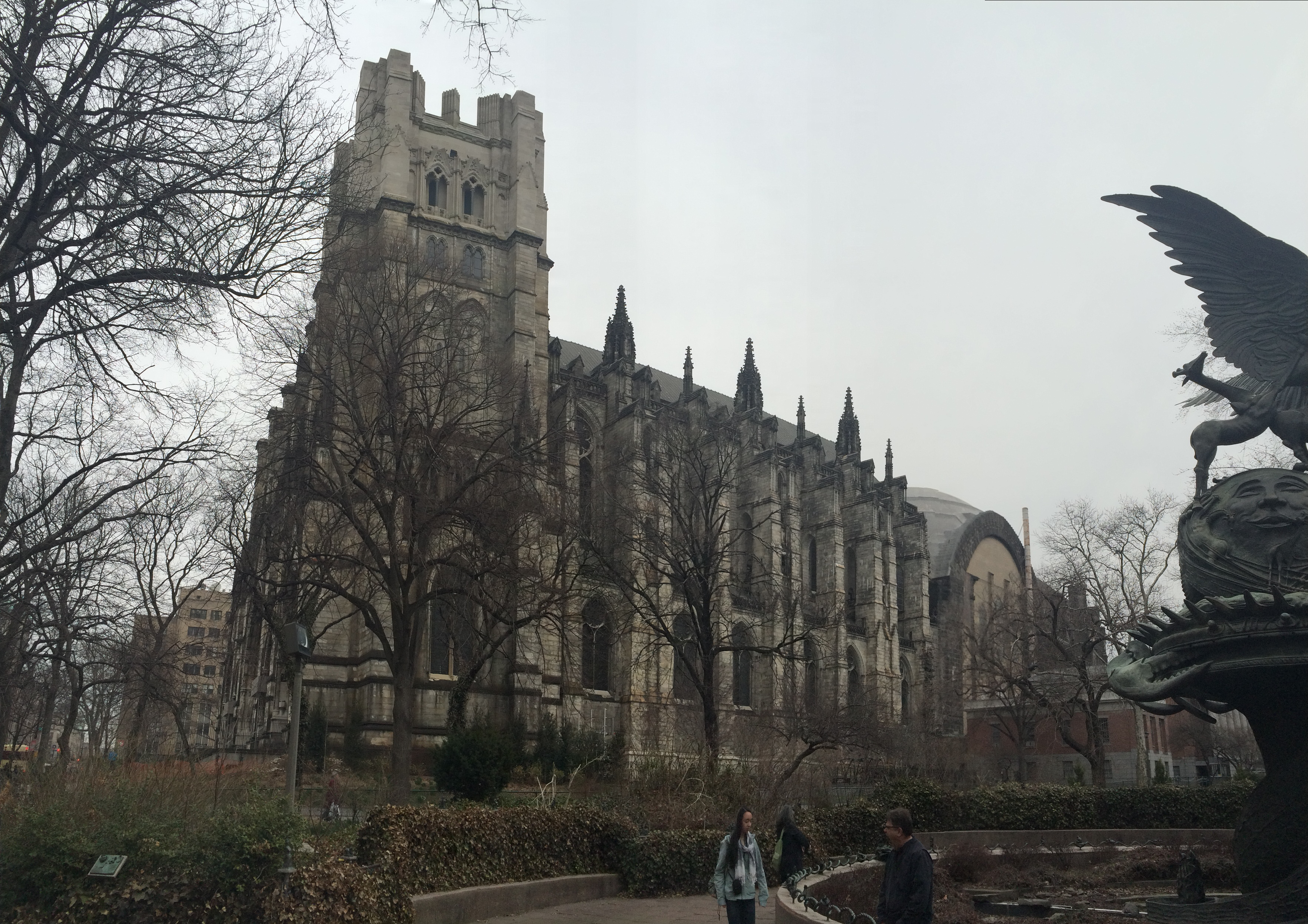
Southern elevation of the facade

The full 601-foot (183 m) length of the Cathedral of St. John the Divine was opened for the first time on November 30, 1941. At that time, St. John's was only three-fifths completed, yet it was the second-largest Christian church in the world by area, behind only St. Peter's Basilica in Vatican City. The event was commemorated with a week-long celebration. The last day of the celebrations, Sunday December 7, 1941, coincided with Japan's attack on Pearl Harbor. With the consequent entry of the United States into World War II, work on the cathedral stopped. The southern transept and tower had yet to start, while the northern transept remained one-third complete. The western towers, planned to be 266 feet (81 m), reached only to the roof of the nave. Cram revised his plans yet again just before his 1942 death, this time with shorter western towers and a slim spire in place of the square tower over the crossing.

==== Halt in construction ====
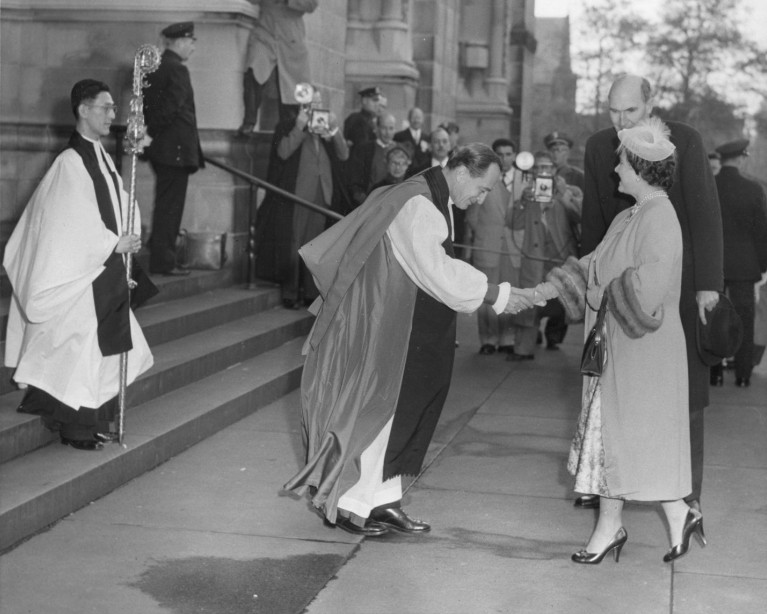
Bishop Horace W. B. Donegan greets Queen Elizabeth The Queen Mother on the steps of the cathedral on the day of the Columbia University Bicentennial, October 31, 1954.

Following the end of World War II, St. John's did not experience any more new construction for three decades. In 1945, Manning had attempted to start a fundraising drive for $10 million so that the remaining funds could be raised for the cathedral's completion. However, during the late 1940s, his successor Bishop Charles Kendall Gilbert turned efforts toward alleviating social issues in the vicinity of the cathedral. Rather than being focused on expansion, the cathedral became more involved in the surrounding community. By that time, a total of $19 million had been spent on construction (equivalent to $257 million in 2025). By the 1950s, there was debate over whether to complete St. John's in the Gothic fashion of the nave; a more contemporary style; or the original Byzantine/Romanesque style. Several plans were proposed through the early 1960s, but none were examined in depth.

In 1966, it was announced that work at St. John's would resume. The trustees had approved a smaller version of the western towers and the crossing, with a modern multicolored dome to be built atop the crossing. The project did not proceed, as Bishop Horace W. B. Donegan said that such work would not occur during his administration; in his opinion the money for construction should be used to help the poor instead. In the 1970s, the cathedral's activities turned toward improving quality of life in Morningside Heights; helping the elderly, young, and the environment; and participating in the civil rights movement and the opposition to United States involvement in the Vietnam War. However, when the Very Reverend James Parks Morton was installed as St. John's dean in 1973, he said that construction at St. John's would start again. Morton said he wanted St. John's to become "a holy place for the whole city". St. John's had become overcrowded because of its increasing focus on community activities, and even though the cathedral was losing $500,000 each year, Morton believed that an expansion would help make space for these extra activities.

==== Resumption of work ====
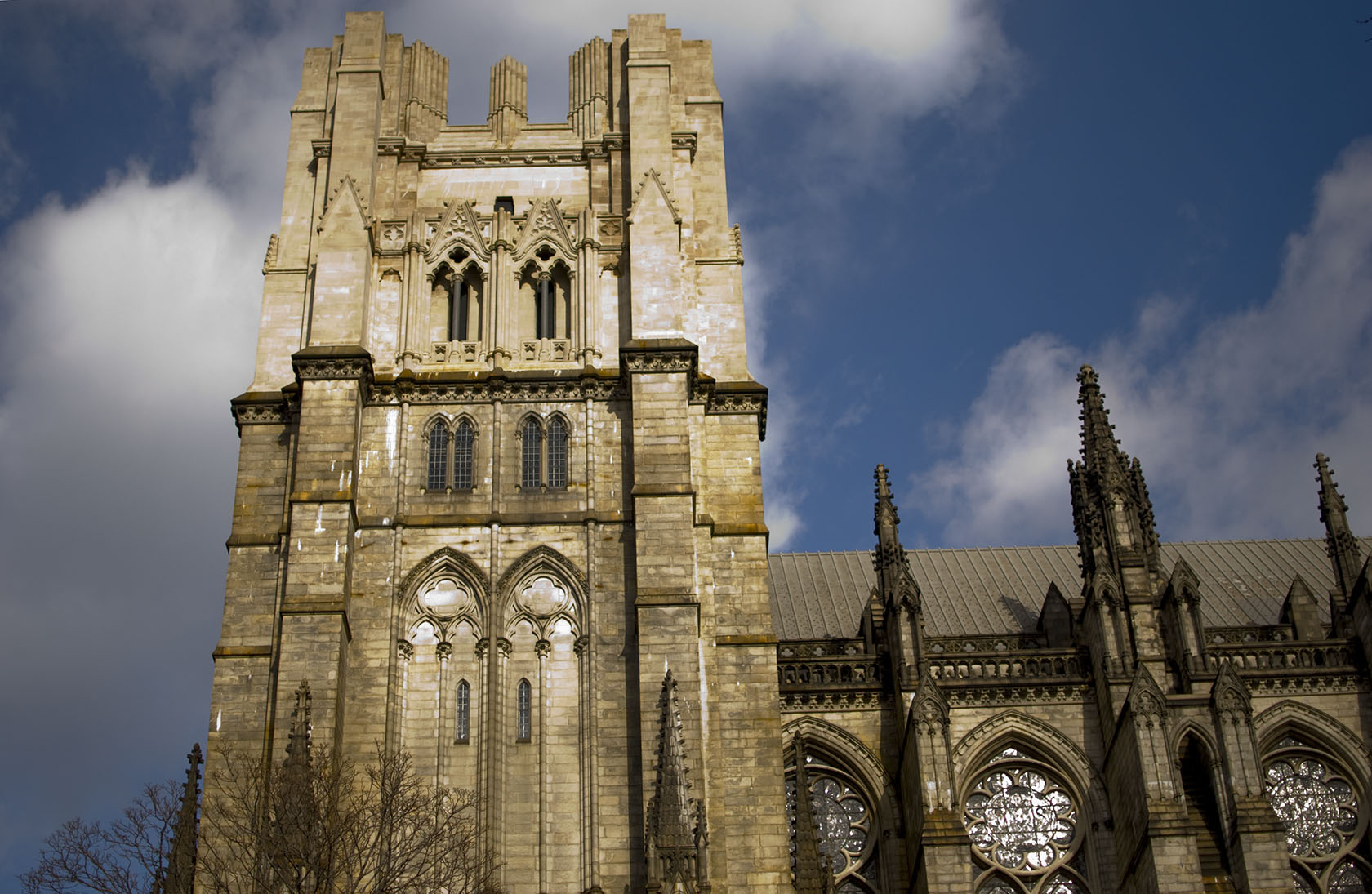
The facade of the southern tower, which was expanded in the 1980s and 1990s

Morton announced in December 1978 that construction would soon begin on the two western towers, making them 150 feet (46 m) taller for a total height of 291 feet (89 m). The job was expected to cost $20 million and take five years. However, by then, there was a shortage of qualified stone carvers in the area. James R. Bambridge, who was hired as the stonemason, planned to employ unskilled younger workers from the surrounding community. Bambridge hired Nicholas G. Fairplay, an English stonemason, as master carver. The architect was Hoyle, Doran and Berry, the successor to Cram's architecture firm. The expansions would be based primarily on Cram's revised designs, published before his death. The north transept would be completed, but would remain separate from the main building.

Work on the western facade's towers was restarted with the opening of St. John's stone yard, the Cathedral Stoneworks, which received its first several Indiana Limestone blocks in June 1979. Construction started first on the south tower, named for Saint Paul, which began to rise in 1982. However, the project continued to be delayed by shortage of funds, slow progress on the towers' designs, and minutely-detailed carving on the south tower that was occupying the stonemasons. By 1984, St. John's was projected to be complete in 2000. Under the leadership of master stone carvers Nicholas Fairplay, Simon Verity, and Jean Claude Marchionni, work on the statuary of the central portal of the cathedral's western elevation was started in 1988 and completed in 1997. During this era, the cathedral expanded its cultural programming, hosting some 140 shows and performances in the 1987–1988 season, some of which drew up to 3,000 observers.

By 1992, the construction budget had been depleted; work was halted, and the stone yard was closed. By then, another 50 feet (15 m) of height had been added to the south tower. While some of the scaffolding was removed, other portions remained, rusting away for fifteen years. The Very Reverend Harry H. Pritchett Jr., who succeeded Morton in 1997, decided against further expansion of St. John's, especially since the existing facilities needed $20–40 million in repairs.

=== 21st century ===
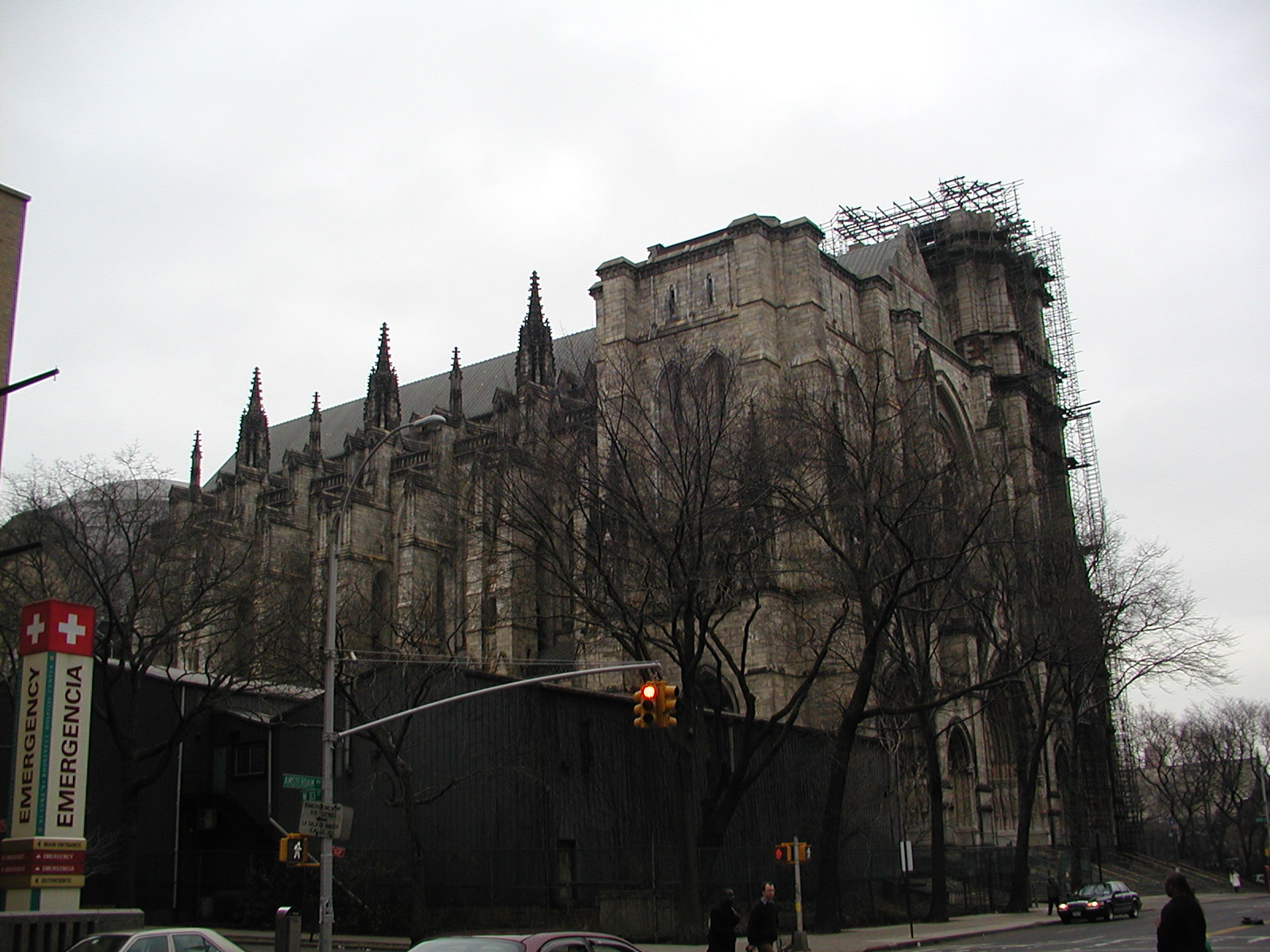
Seen from the north in 2005, with scaffolding still on the southern tower

On December 18, 2001, a fire swept through the unfinished north transept, destroying the gift shop and damaging tapestries. Despite the damage sustained, St. John's reopened two weeks later. Though the pipe organ was not damaged, all its pipes and other component parts were removed and restored. Valuable tapestries and other items in the cathedral were damaged by the smoke. In January 2005, the cathedral began a major restoration to not only remove smoke damage resulting from the 2001 fire, but also clean the 80 years of dirt accumulation in the nave. The renovations temporarily depleted St. John's funds: the unaffected portions of the cathedral started to deteriorate, staff salary raises were deferred, and several staff positions were eliminated. The scaffolding around the south tower was removed in 2007, and the cathedral was rededicated on November 30, 2008.

The cathedral's main building was made a city landmark in June 2003, but the designation was overturned that October, since it did not cover the entire cathedral close. At the same time, St. John's officials wanted to lease out the lots at the northern and southern borders of the cathedral close for further development, a move that preservationists unsuccessfully attempted to prevent. Ultimately, two residential buildings were erected on these lots: Avalon Morningside Park on the southern lot and the Enclave on the northern lot. In 2017, the cathedral close was re-designated a city landmark, except for the two new residential buildings. The next year, the first phase of the north transept's renovation was finally completed, and work began on a renovation of the crypt.

On April 14, 2019, a small fire occurred in the crypt; except for smoke damage, the cathedral building was mostly unaffected. Many artworks stored in the crypt were reportedly damaged or destroyed in the fire. An initial cleaning removed smoke damage from the bottom 10 feet of the interior of the cathedral. A cleaning of the rest of the interior was also ongoing. Ennead Architects proposed erecting a copper dome above the crossing so that the crossing's tiles could be rehabilitated. The restoration of the dome was completed in 2022. The New York City government gave the cathedral a $1.5 million grant in August 2024 to convert Synod Hall into a community center. A restoration of the organ, which had been damaged in the 2019 fire, was completed in December 2024. Unseen, a sculpture by Nisha Bansil consisting of 50,000 glass ginkgo leaves, was dedicated at the cathedral in June 2026.

== Main structure ==
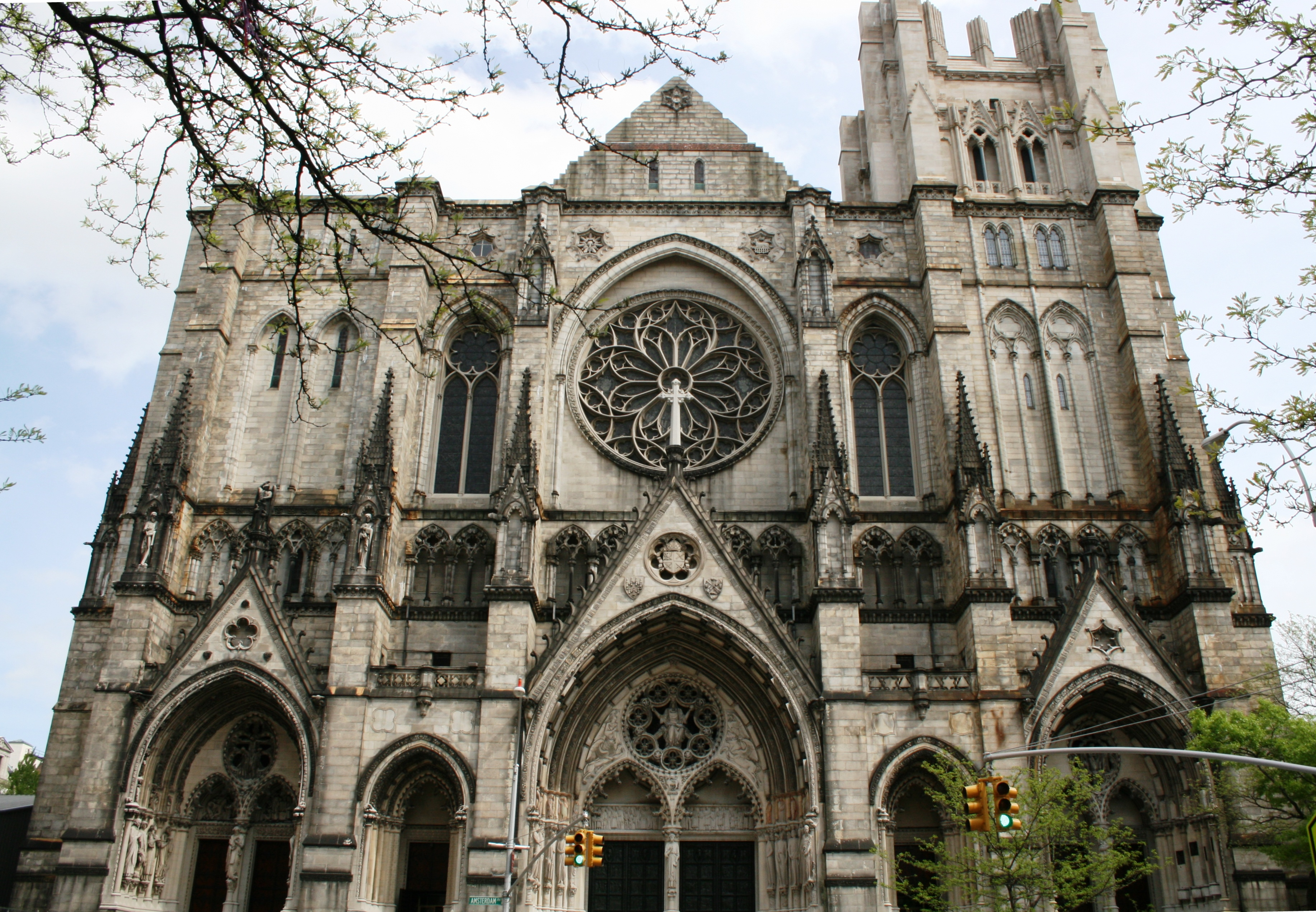
View of the western elevation from across Amsterdam Avenue to the west

The Cathedral of St. John the Divine is located at 1047 Amsterdam Avenue in Morningside Heights, Manhattan, between West 110th Street (also known as Cathedral Parkway) to the south and 113th Street to the north. The cathedral's main entrance on the west is along the same axis as 112th Street. Adjacent sites include Mount Sinai Morningside (formerly St. Luke's Hospital) to the north, Columbia University's Morningside Heights campus to the north and west, and Morningside Park to the east. One of the key reasons for St. John's location is that the land under it was described as the "highest point in Manhattan". (Note: However, St. John's is not literally at the highest point in Manhattan. That distinction belongs to Bennett Park in Hudson Heights, 265 feet (81 m) above sea level.) One author wrote that "the view from outside tells much about St. John's inner spirit", saying that the southeastern elevation of the facade gives an impression of incompleteness, while the great western elevation was "vitalized by its incipience".

St. John's is oriented west–east relative to the street grid (Note: The street grid, as laid out in the Commissioners' Plan of 1811, is rotated about 29 degrees clockwise from true compass west and east.) and was originally supposed to have a cruciform plan, with transepts extending to the north and south of the crossing near the eastern end of the cathedral. The entire structure measures 601 feet (183 m) long. From west to east, the cathedral contains a narthex measuring 50 feet (15 m) long by 207 feet (63 m) wide; a nave of 248 by 146 feet (76 by 45 m); a crossing of 100 by 100 feet (30 by 30 m); a choir of 145 by 56 feet (44 by 17 m); and the Chapel of St. Savior in the apse, measuring 58 feet (18 m) with an ambulatory 14 feet (4.3 m) wide. The cathedral's western elevation is 207 feet (63 m) wide; if the transepts had been completed, they would have measured 330 feet (100 m) from end to end. The cathedral has an interior floor area of 121,000 square feet (11,200 m^{2}) and can host 8,600 people. As of 2024, these dimensions make St. John's the fourth-largest Christian cathedral in the world and a rival to Liverpool Cathedral for the world's largest Anglican cathedral.

The cathedral's original design was by Heins & LaFarge. Despite the primarily Byzantine and Romanesque influences of their initial proposal, their last revisions gave a significantly Gothic-style appearance. The original plan called for tiled-arch domes and barrel vaults, a crossing held up by four round arches under a dome, and a tower on top. The completed cathedral was supposed to have been 520 feet (160 m) long and 290 feet (88 m) wide between transepts, while the tower would have been 450 feet (140 m) tall.

The modern plan for the building, as it appeared upon its official opening in 1941, conforms primarily to the second design campaign from the prolific Gothic revival architect Ralph Adams Cram. The plans are based on the French Gothic style, with English Gothic accents. Cram had initially wanted to use English Gothic models, which typically placed less emphasis on vertical elements and height, and which contrasted with the extant parts of the cathedral. Cram's plan originally called for three main entrances, two 500-foot (150 m) spires set back from the western facade, and two smaller spires on the western facade. Inside he proposed ten full-height aisles, with a triforium and clerestory rising to the ceiling, as well as large chapels along each side of the nave. The design provides a transition between the nave and the crossing, because the nave was to be 50 feet (15 m) wide, about half the width of the crossing. Cram, described as a "brilliant perfectionist", frequently revised his proposal and later spoke of Heins & LaFarge's plans as better than his own. One major change, published in 1926, called for a 300-foot-tall (91 m), square tower above the crossing and five portals on the western elevation. Another revision was published just before he died in 1942, and called for a spire above the crossing. Cram's designs were not fully built, either. The Cathedral of St. John the Divine remains two-thirds complete and is often nicknamed St. John the Unfinished. As of 2025, no major construction work was ongoing; according to the cathedral's website, its funds were being used mainly "to prioritize serving the community through our programming and social initiatives, and to maintaining the architectural integrity of the Cathedral".

=== Narthex and western facade ===
==== Narthex ====
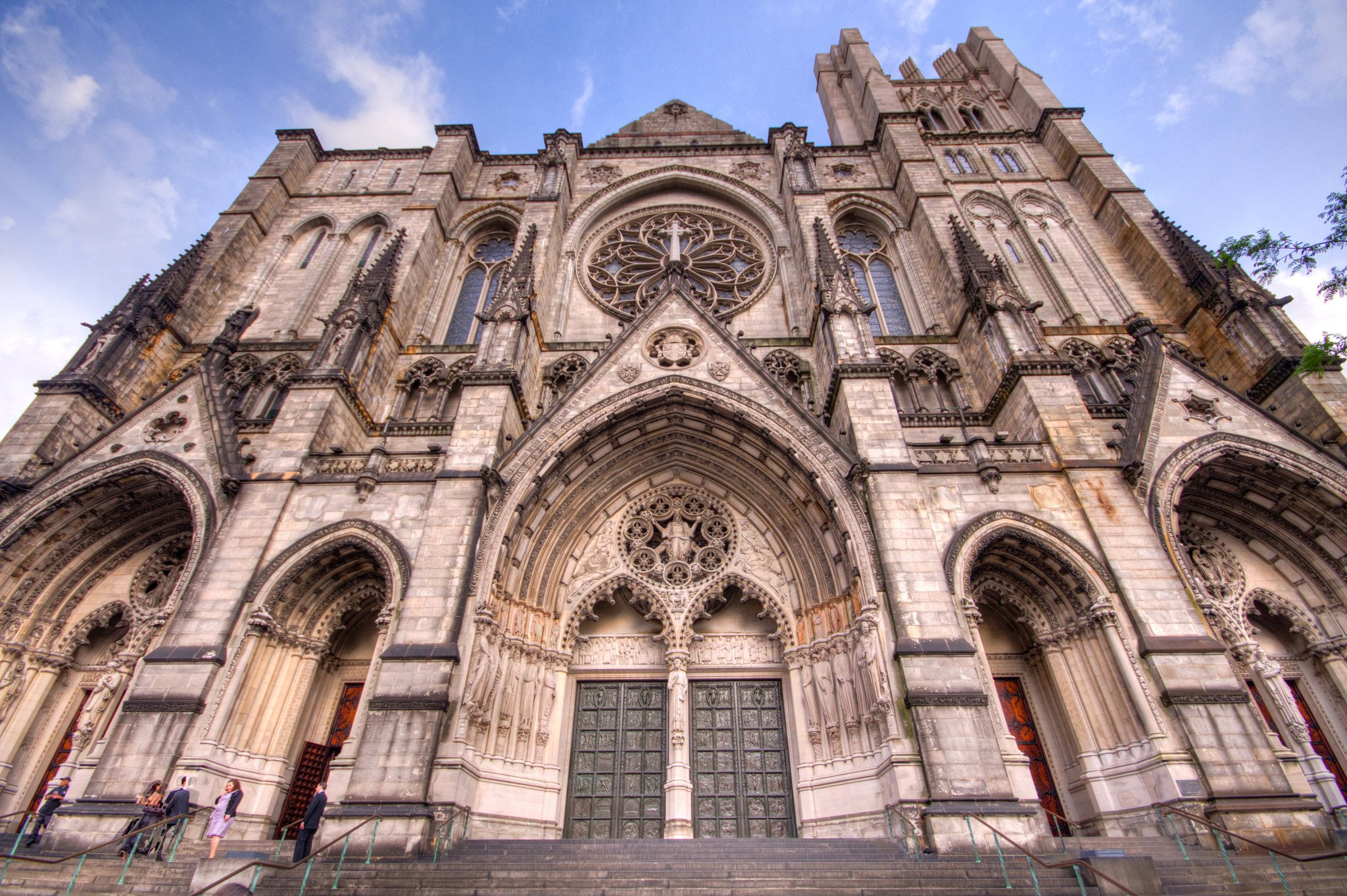
Wide angle view of the cathedral's western elevation

The narthex, in the westernmost portion of the cathedral facing Amsterdam Avenue, was designed by Cram. His original plans did not include a narthex, instead showing the nave continuing as far as the western facade. Inside the narthex is a large vestibule, which serves as an entrance to the nave on the east. The vestibule measures 180 feet (55 m) along the north–south axis and 85 feet (26 m) along the west–east axis. The southern part of the narthex contains the cathedral's gift shop.

Above the narthex are two towers: one named for Saint Peter to the north and the other named for Saint Paul to the south. The north tower reaches to the roof of the nave, which is 177 feet (54 m) above ground level; the south tower is about 50 feet (15 m) taller, with the additional height having been built between 1982 and 1992. If the towers had been completed, they would have been about 266 feet (81 m) tall. The towers protrude slightly from the northern and southern elevations of the facade but are flush with the western elevation. On the northern and southern facades of the narthex, at the base of the towers, are stained glass windows, one on each side.

==== Western facade ====
The narthex abuts the unfinished western elevation of the facade facing Amsterdam Avenue; this facade is 207 feet (63 m) wide and consists of five architectural bays. The bays are separated by large arched buttresses with finials at their tops, and they contain niches for the possible future installation of statues. The western elevation is divided into four vertical tiers. From bottom to top, they are the ground-level portals, on the first tier; the gallery level, on the second tier; the large rose window and several smaller grisaille and lancet windows, on the third tier; and the top of the south tower and the gable above the center bay, on the fourth tier.

At ground level, there are five portals under arched openings. The largest of those is the center portal, called the Portal of Paradise, which contains carvings of the transfiguration of Jesus as well as St. John and 32 biblical characters; these were carved in 1988 under Simon Verity's leadership. St. John is depicted on the trumeau, or vertical pier, between the two pairs of doors within the center portal. The center portal also contains depictions of New York City skyscrapers being destroyed in an apocalypse. The center, northernmost, and southernmost portals are set within large, gabled structures with several archivolts, or arched moldings, surrounding each portal under the gables; porches overhang the portals above the gables. The other two portals are located under simple rectangular canopy structures, located underneath grisaille windows looking into the nave. Lights salvaged from the former Pennsylvania Station illuminate the steps in front of the portals.

Above the center portal, between the towers, is a rose window installed by stained glass artist Charles Connick and constructed out of 10,000 pieces of glass. With a diameter of 40 feet (12 m), the rose window is the largest rose window in the U.S. Flanking the rose window on either side are two grisaille windows, each with two lancet windows under a smaller rose. The seven archangels are depicted in the north grisaille, while the seven churches of Asia are depicted in the south grisaille. Connick had designed the grisailles as well. On the gable above the large rose window, there are lancets as well as a medallion in the middle.

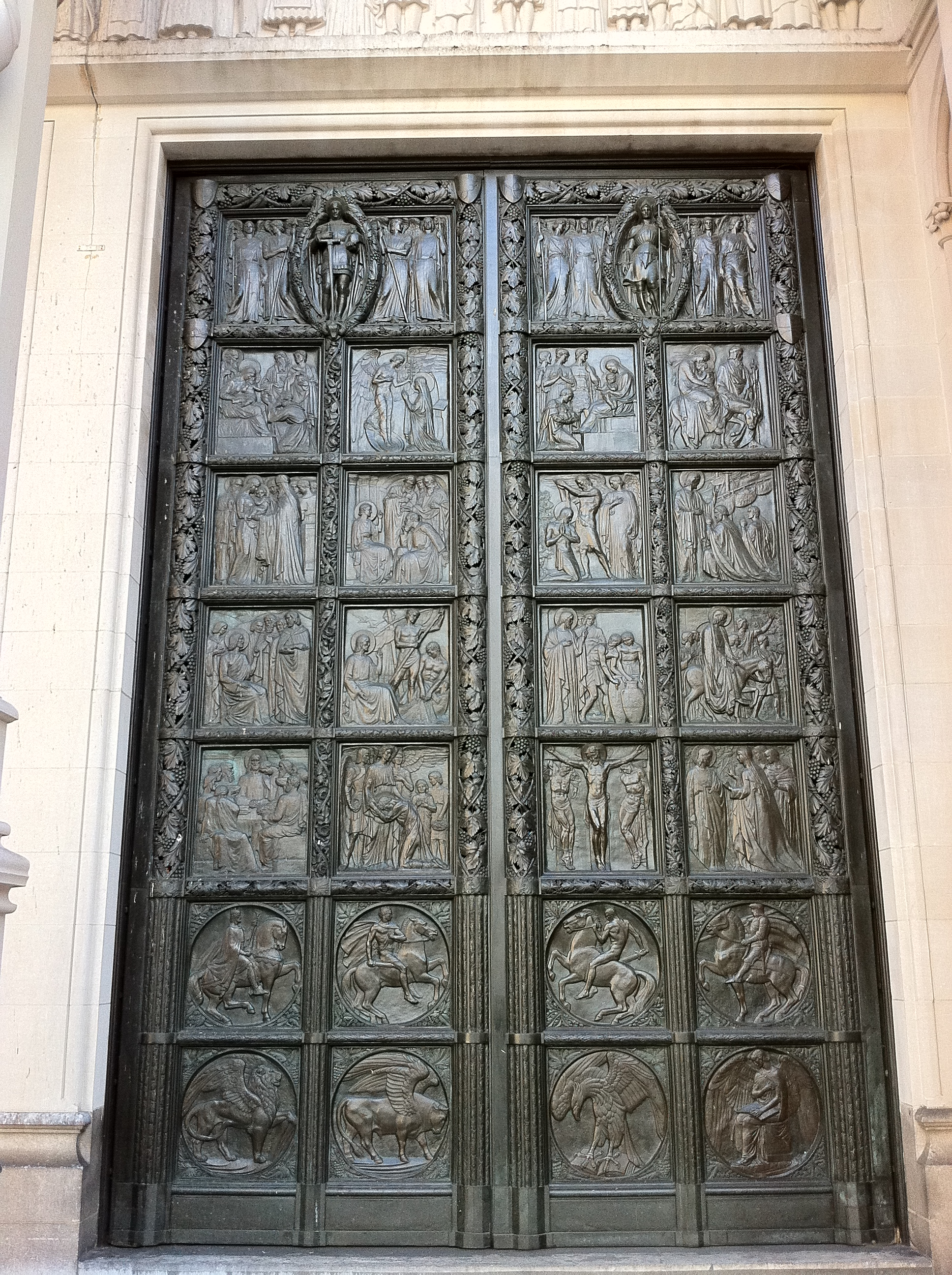
The right-hand bronze doors in the center portal

The two pairs of great west doors on the western elevation, set beneath the elaborate center portal, were designed between 1927 and 1931 by the designer Henry Wilson. The bronze doors include a sequence of 60 relief panels, which presents scenes from the Old and New Testaments and the Apocalypse. The doors open three times per year: Easter; St. Francis's feast day in October; and the "blessing of the bicycles" in the spring. They comprise one of four bronze-door commissions designed by Wilson before his death. (Note: The other three are at St Bartholomew's Church, Brighton; St Mary's Church, Nottingham; and Salada Tea Company, Boston.) St. John's great west doors were the last of the four commissions, each pair measuring some 18 by 12 feet (5.5 m × 3.7 m). The remaining doors on the western elevation are composed of Burmese teak with wrought iron decoration.

=== Nave ===
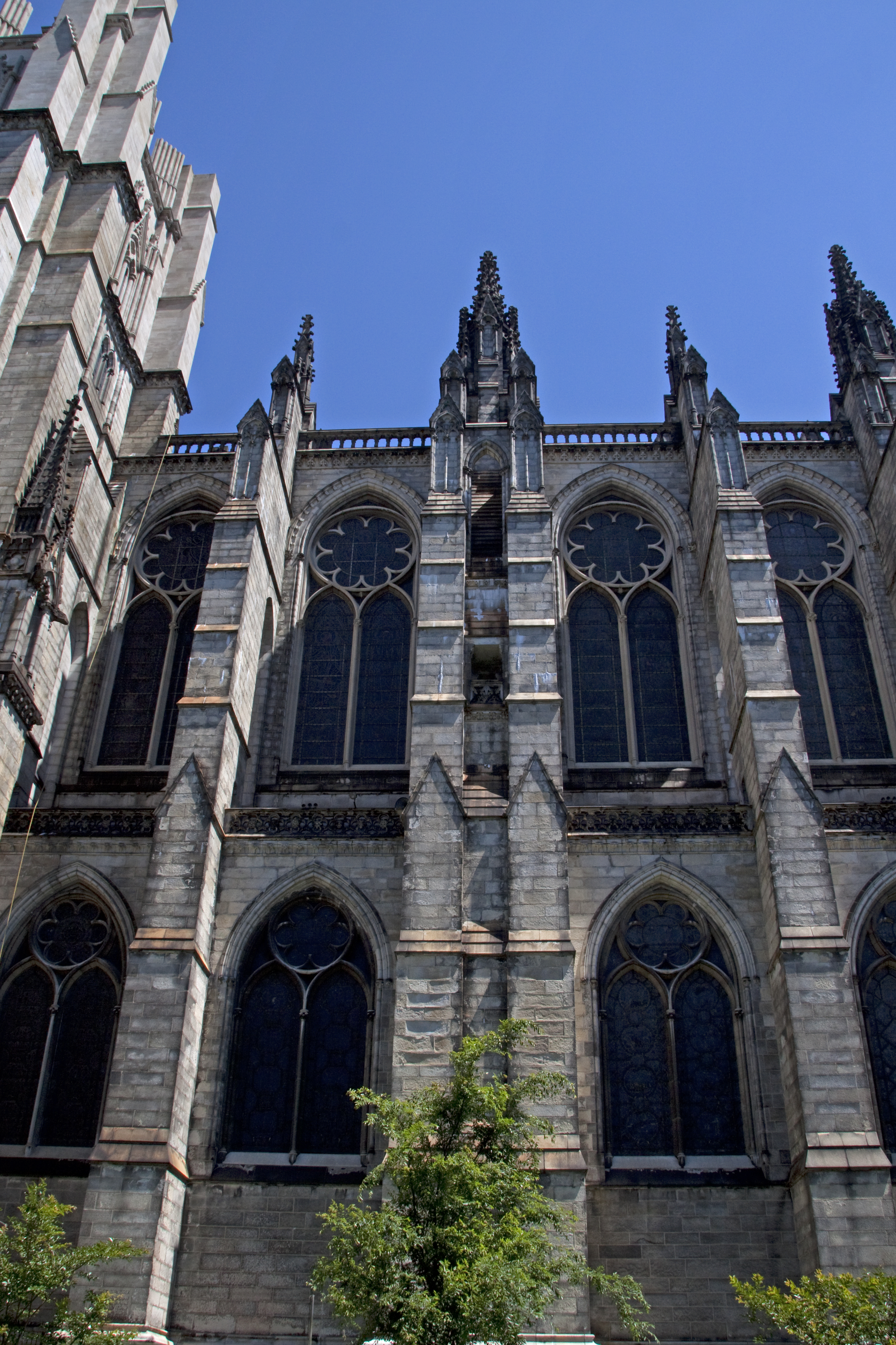
Exterior of the nave. Two of the double bays can be seen here, with four columns of windows in total. At center is a large arched buttress, while smaller buttresses to the left and right separate each set of double bays.

The nave was designed by Cram, though the final plan is slightly modified from the original. It is oriented from west to east, measuring 248 feet (76 m) long by 146 feet (45 m) wide. The ceiling is 124 feet (38 m) above ground level, but the ridge of the roof is 174 feet (53 m) high. These dimensions are about the same as in the original plans, which called for floor dimensions of 260 by 150 feet (79 by 46 m). a 175-foot (53 m) roof, and a 125-foot (38 m) ceiling.

On the northern and southern elevations, there are four vertical "double bays", each with two columns of windows. Large arched buttresses, with two piers each, separate the different double bays; smaller buttresses, containing a single pier, divide each double bay into smaller "sub-bays". This alternation of large and small buttresses gives the appearance of four double bays with two sub-bays each, rather than eight singular rectangular bays. At the arcade level, each of the sub-bays contains an arrangement of stained glass with two lancet windows under a rose window. The sub-bays also contain another stained-glass arrangement at clerestory level, each with two lancet windows and one rose window. The clerestory arrangements each measure 45 feet (14 m) long by 12 feet (3.7 m) wide. Carved parapets, as well as gables with dormers, run along the copper roof.

Inside, there are six north–south rows of piers, three to either side of the nave. These piers divide the nave into five aisles running west to east, with the center aisle located on the same axis as 112th Street. There are four smaller aisles, two to either side of the center aisle. Additionally, the interior contains several flying buttresses, concealed by "bridges" that carry them over the outermost aisles.

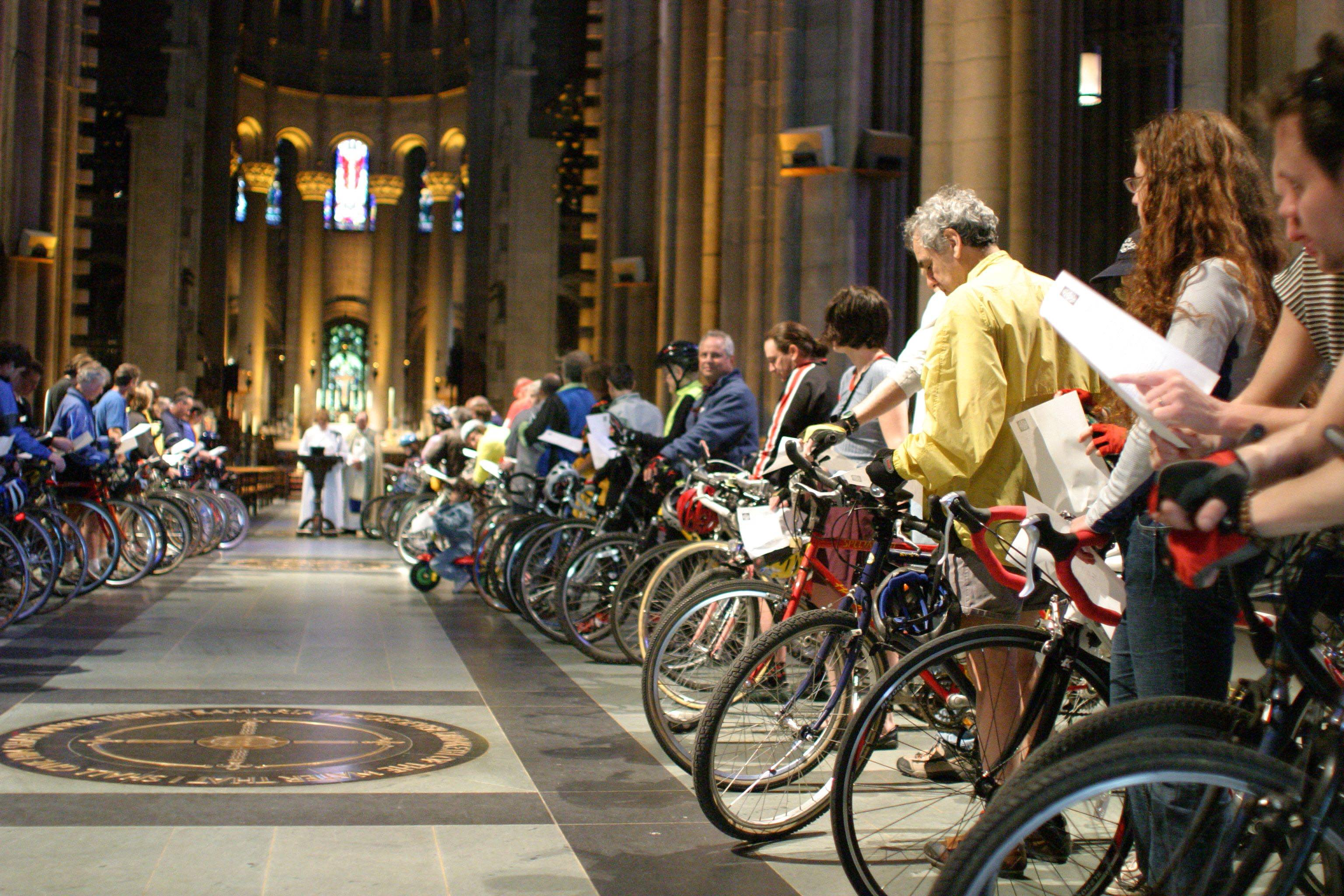
The Blessing of the Bicycles in the nave, looking toward the apse

There are sixteen sub-bays in the nave, eight on each side; the easternmost sub-bays on either side contain doorways. Each of the bays are named after some aspect of humanity. From west to east, the sub-bays along the northern side of the nave are named the Sports, Arts, Crusaders, Education, Lawyers, Ecclesiastical Origins (Anglican), and Historical and Patriotic Societies' (American), and Fatherhood bays. The sub-bays on the southern side are named the All Souls', Missionary, Labor, Press (Communication), Medical, Religious Life (Earth), Armed Forces (Military), and Motherhood bays. Each of the sub-bays contain carved parapets atop their mono-pitched roofs. The sub-bays are used for various exhibits. The iconography of the stained-glass windows in the arcade and clerestory is related to the theme of each respective sub-bay. (Note: Quirk 1993, pp. 43–75, gives a detailed analysis of the stained glass at arcade level. Quirk 1993, pp. 76–83, describes the stained glass in the clerestory.) In each sub-bay, between the lower windows and the clerestory windows, is the triforium level, which contains two west–east corridors with numerous windowless rooms and office spaces.

=== Apse ===
The apse, located at St. John's eastern end, is made up of numerous components. The center of the apse contains the choir, located below the great organ. Two ambulatory passages run adjacent to the choir, one to the north and the other to the south. Seven chapels, a baptistery, and a columbarium are also located in the northwestern part of the apse. The apse contains two sets of clerestory windows: the large ambulatory clerestories with multiple panels, as well as a smaller sanctuary clerestory window above each of the ambulatory clerestories. The apse's walls are supported by gabled buttresses, which are taller than the height of the walls, and contain niches with statues.

==== Choir ====
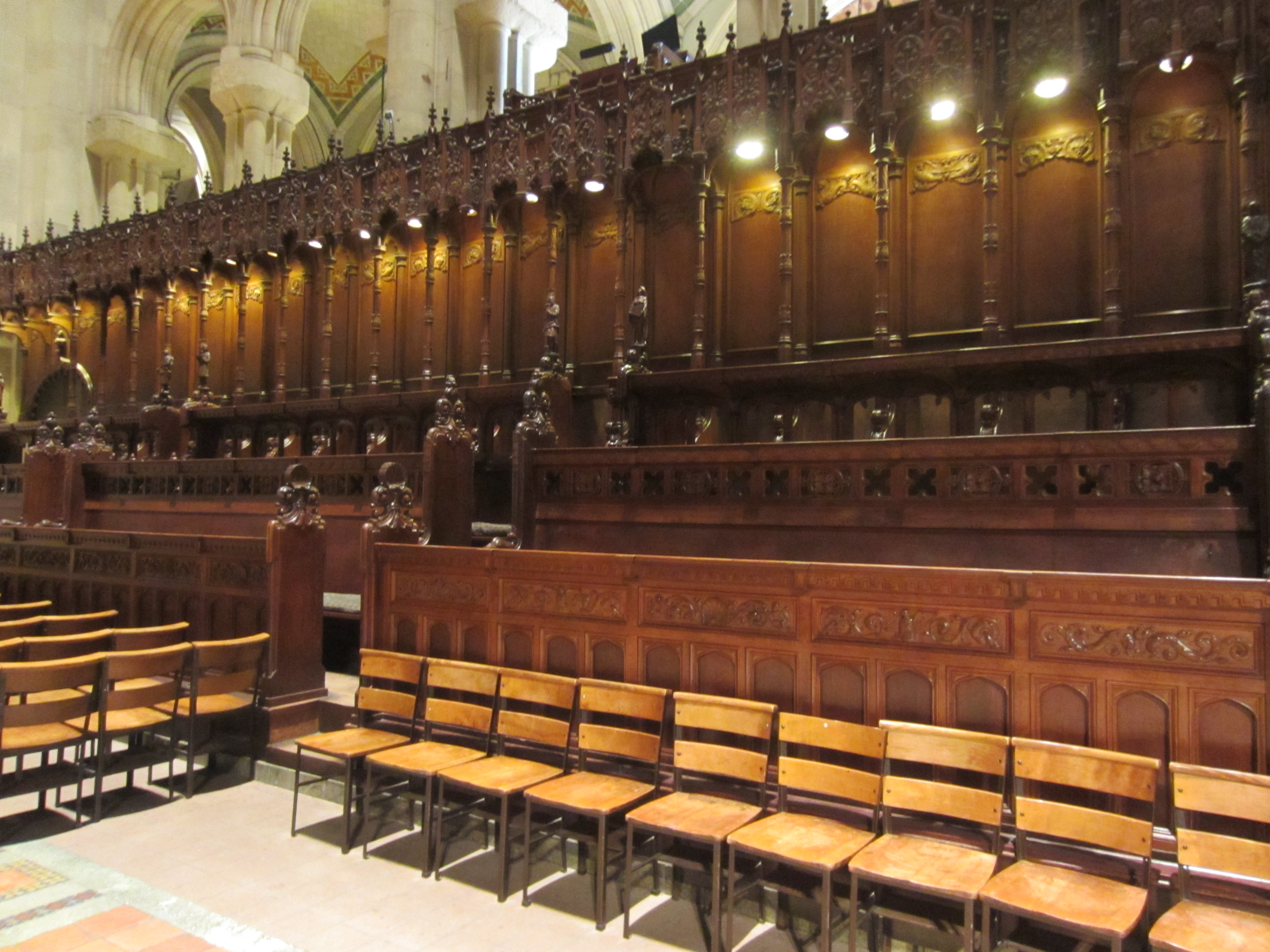
Choir stalls

The choir was consecrated in 1911. It consists of two sets of wooden stalls facing each other, with three rows in each stall. The stalls were made by the Philadelphia-based John Barber Company. The westernmost unit in the southern row of choir stalls is called the "Dean's Stall". The roof above the choir is supported by eight columns, each 54 feet (16 m) tall with a 6-foot (1.8 m) diameter and a weight of 130 short tons (120 long tons; 120 t). The columns' foundations descend as much as 130 feet (40 m) into the bedrock below them.

The parapets behind the two sections of the choir were originally installed in 1922 with twenty niches for statues of the spiritual heroes of the twenty centuries since the birth of Christ. For example, the 17th, 18th, and 19th centuries are respectively represented by statues of William Shakespeare, George Washington, and Abraham Lincoln. The niche for the 20th century was left blank through the end of that century. In 2001 the choir parapet was completed with carvings of Martin Luther King Jr., Albert Einstein, Susan B. Anthony, and Mohandas Gandhi by stonecarver Christopher Pellettieri. In addition, the finials on both rows of stalls were carved by Otto Jahnsen and depict church-music composers and performers.

On the floor are tiles designed by the Grueby Faience Company, with geometric patterns and imagery reminiscent of the iconography in other cathedrals. A compass rose, the official icon of the Anglican Communion (in which the Episcopal Church participates), is located on the floor between the two stalls, in the center of the choir.

==== Great Organ ====
The Great Organ was built by Ernest M. Skinner in 1906–1910. It is located above the choir on the north and south sides, and consists of four manual keyboards with several pedals. The opening recital was given in 1911 by Clarence Dickinson. In 1954, it was enlarged by the Aeolian-Skinner Organ Company, Opus 150-A, under the tonal direction of G. Donald Harrison. The organ contains 8,514 pipes, though it previously included 8,035. While most of the pipes are located above the choir stalls, the Great Organ also controls the State Trumpet, located beneath the rose window about 500 feet (150 m) to the west.

The 2001 fire in the north transept resulted in heavy smoke damage to the organ, and it was subsequently restored by Quimby Pipe Organs, Inc., of Warrensburg, Missouri. After two years of extensive and detailed refurbishment work, including a reorganization of many pipes and a rebuilding of the console, the organ finally returned to service in 2008 as part of an overall $41-million cleaning and repair to the cathedral. The Great Organ was damaged again in the April 2019 crypt fire, and was indefinitely placed out of service pending a thorough cleaning. While the Great Organ was being restored, the Cathedral of St. John the Divine used an electric organ.

The organists have included:

- Walter Henry Hall (1905–1909)
- Miles Farrow (1910–1931) (Note: From 1910 to 1990, the organist for the cathedral was also the organist for the Cathedral School.)
- Norman Coke-Jephcott (1932–1953)
- John Upham (interim) (1953–1954)
- Alec Wyton (1954–1974)
- David Pizzaro (1974–1977)
- Paul Halley (1977–1990)
- Dorothy Papadakos (1990–2003)
- Timothy Brumfield (2003–2009)
- Bruce Neswick (2009–2011)
- Kent Tritle (2011–present)

==== Sanctuary ====
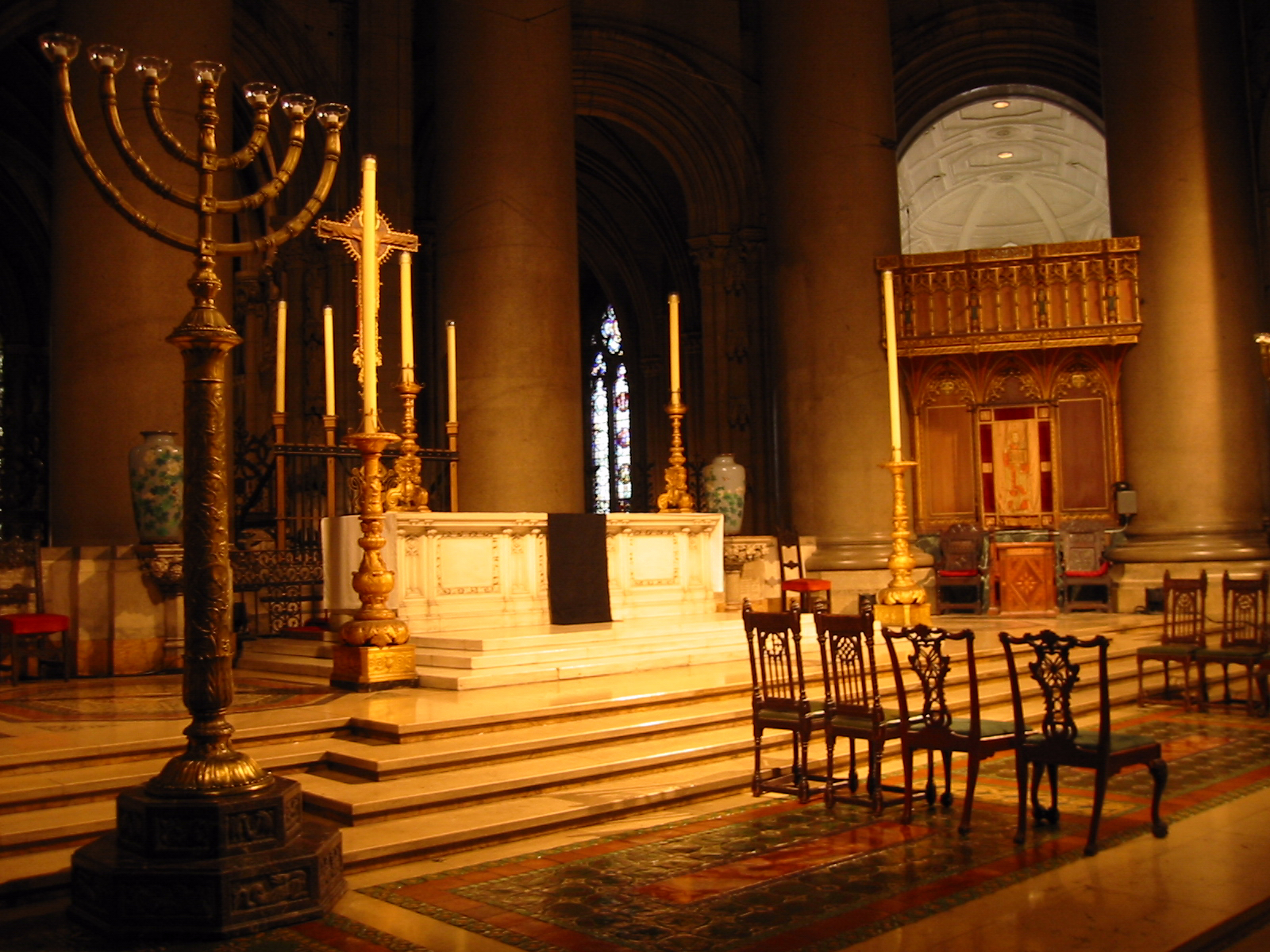
Altar

Behind the choir, to its east, is the sanctuary (or chancel), a raised platform. The chancel includes the high altar, which is made of white Vermont marble. The Magna Carta Pedestal—named as such because it is located atop three stones from the Bury St Edmunds Abbey in England—is located to the right, while the sedilia for the bishop and other clergy is to the left. The sanctuary also contains the cathedra (or bishop's seat), donated by Olivia Egleston Phelps Stokes in memory of her sister Caroline Phelps Stokes. The bishop's pulpit is made of Tennessee marble, with five niches, each of which contain reliefs that depict scenes from the life of Christ. A presbytery, which houses the officiating clergy of St. John's, is located between the chancel and the choir. The reredos behind the sanctuary depicts four scenes from the Old Testament on the left (north), and four from the New Testament on the right (south).

Behind the altar is a wrought iron enclosure. The space contains the English Gothic style tomb of the man who originally conceived and founded the cathedral, the Right Reverend Horatio Potter, which was dedicated in 1921.

==== Ambulatory and chapels ====
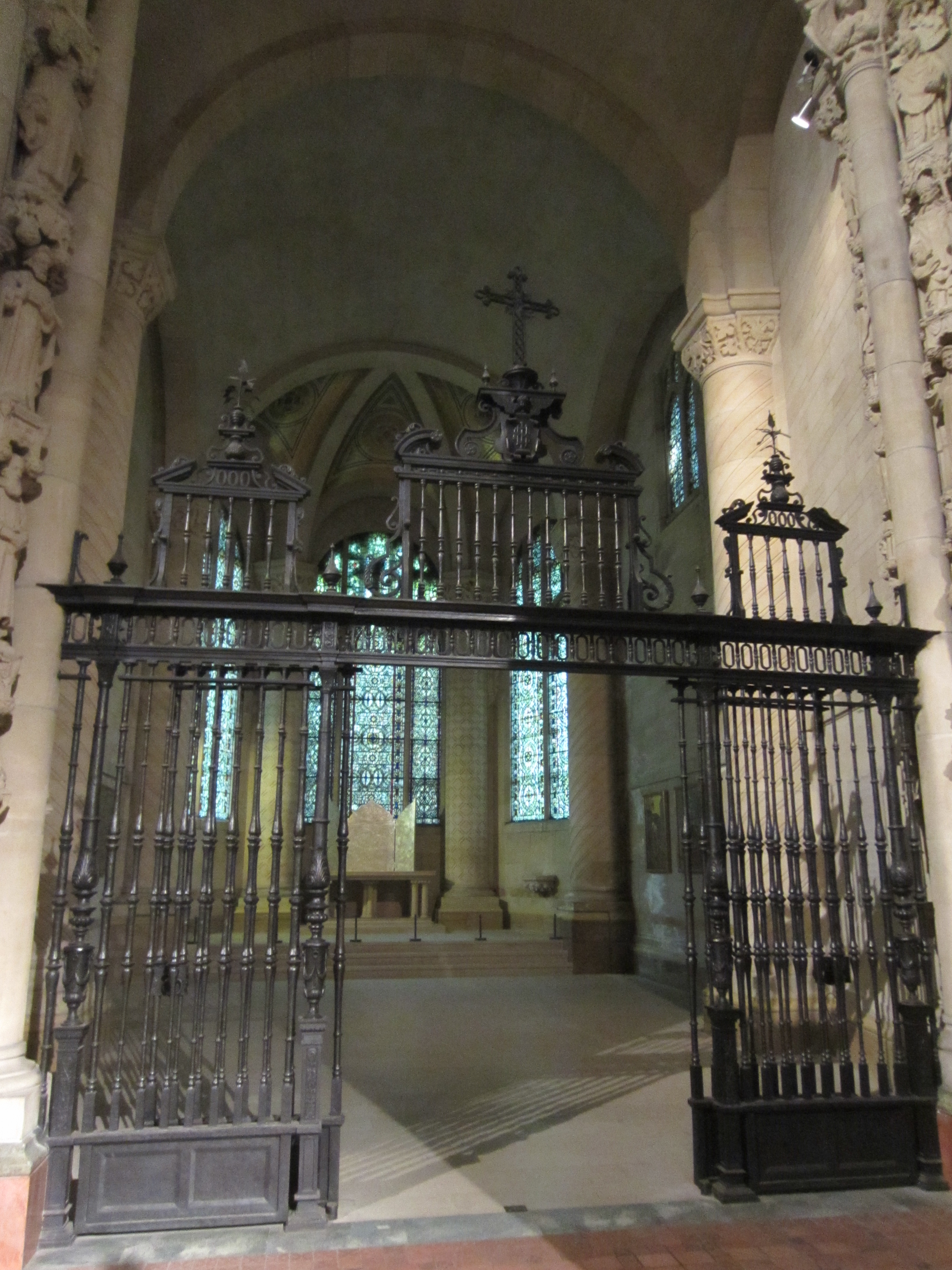
One of the chapels

An ambulatory, measuring 250 feet (76 m) long and 14 feet (4.3 m) wide, surrounds the choir to the north, east, and south, making a rough "U" shape with the two ends of the "U" facing west. The floor is covered with red clay-colored tiles that contain green-serpentine borders. There are 30-foot-tall (9.1 m) wrought-steel gates at either end of the ambulatory. Numerous plaques are present in the ambulatory, paying homage to large donors and other notable individuals in St. John's history. A "poetry wall" and several Madonna paintings are also located in the ambulatory, particularly in the southern part of the ambulatory.

Extending outward from the ambulatory are seven chapels. These chapels are known as the "Chapels of the Tongues", and all were donated by prominent individuals and families. The chapels were designed by four different architects and firms: Heins & LaFarge designed two of the chapels, while Cram designed a third. The Chapels of the Tongues were devoted to seven of the city's largest immigrant groups when the apse was completed: the southernmost three chapels represent "Latin races" and the northernmost three chapels represent "Germanic races". All of the chapels, except for St. Ansgar's, were donated by individuals or families. (Note: The donors for each chapel were: St. Ansgar: built in memory of William Reed Huntington; St. Boniface: gift of George and Julia Bowdoin and their children; St. Columba: gift of Mary Augusta King; St. Savior: gift of August Belmont Jr.; St. Martin: gift of Clementina Furniss; St. Ambrose: gift of Sara Whiting Rives; St. James: gift of Elizabeth Scriven Potter, wife of Henry Codman Potter) Clockwise from north, they are devoted to:

- St. Ansgar, patron of Denmark; designed by Henry Vaughan, dedicated 1918. St. Ansgar Chapel has its own organ.
- St. Boniface, apostle of the Germans; designed by Henry Vaughan, dedicated 1916.
- St. Columba, patron of Ireland and Scotland; designed by Heins & LaFarge, dedicated 1911.
- St. Savior (Holy Savior), devoted to immigrants from Africa and Asia; designed by Heins & LaFarge, dedicated 1911. St. Savior was the first chapel to be complete, hosting its first services in 1904. It contains a bronze three-paneled altar with gold-leaf decoration, designed by Keith Haring just before his death.
- St. Martin of Tours, patron of the French; designed by Cram & Ferguson, dedicated 1918.
- St. Ambrose, patron of Milan; designed by Carrère and Hastings, dedicated 1914.
- St. James, patron of Spain; designed by Henry Vaughan, dedicated 1916. St. James Chapel is the largest apsidal chapel, with a seating capacity of 25 people, and is frequently utilized for small funerals, weddings, or worship services. The chapel has its own choir and 857-pipe organ.

The northwest corner of the apse, adjacent to the St. Ansgar Chapel, includes the octagonal baptistery. The baptistery was donated by three Stuyvesant family siblings in 1924. The space measures 31 feet (9.4 m) in diameter with a ceiling 43 feet (13 m) tall. The baptistery's iconography depicts the Stuyvesant family history; icons of New Amsterdam, New York, and Dutch history; and the 12 apostles.

The columbarium, established in the 1970s, is in a room directly west of the baptistery. It contains marble vaults, which store the remains of people from all religions.

=== Crossing ===
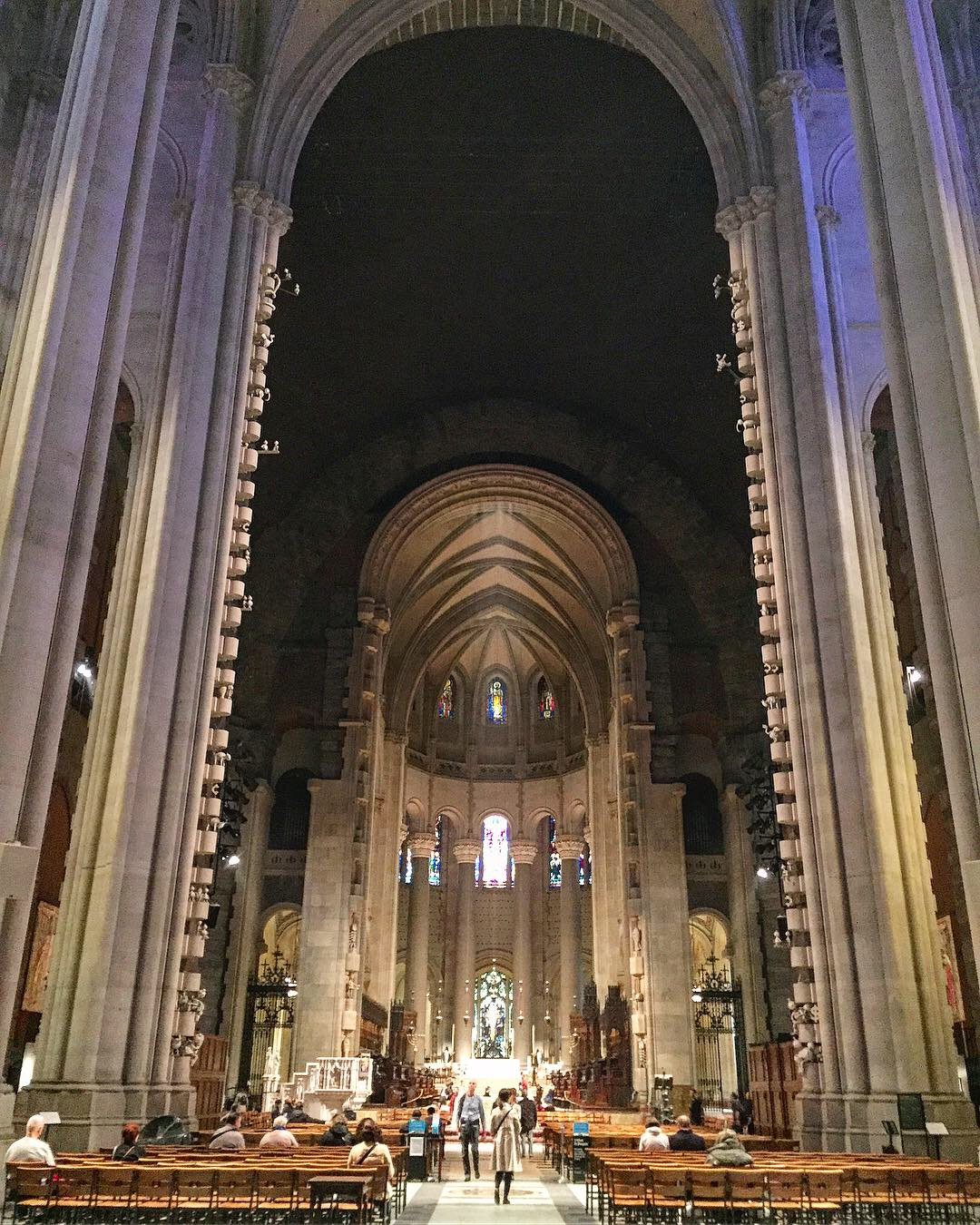
The crossing (dark stone ceiling), viewed from the nave. The apse is in the background.

Between the nave to the west and the apse to the east is the crossing, designed by Rafael Guastavino. The interior of the crossing includes four massive granite arches, which in the original Heins & LaFarge design were originally intended to support the massive 445-foot (136 m) tower above it. When completed in 1900, the arches were described as the "crowning glory" of Morningside Heights. During the time that the nave remained incomplete, temporary walls were placed within the arches so that services could be held in the crossing.

Above the crossing is a domed roof, which was meant as a temporary covering until the tower above the crossing was built. It was completed within fifteen weeks between May and August 1909. The dome is shaped like a saucer, and consists of several overlapping layers of Guastavino tile, which support themselves around the dome's center upon their own weight. The pendentives, or triangular areas between the circular dome and the corners of the arches, are 1 inch (25 mm) thick; the thickness of the dome itself ranges from 4 inches (100 mm) on top to 7.5 inches (190 mm) at the bottom. Compared to conventional ceilings, the tiles saved money because they did not require temporary supports when they were installed. For added strength, metal rods were included in the dome's shell.

The dome was originally intended to be temporary. Cram had proposed three plans for the structure above the crossing: a steeple, a square tower rising 500 feet (150 m) above the crossing floor, and then a slim spire. None of these plans were realized. A three-year renovation project from 2019 to 2022 repaired cracks in tiles, patched concrete, added new protective materials, and built a new copper dome over the crossing.

=== Basements ===
Directly below the crossing is the basement, which contains the crypt, now used as a storage area. The items stored in the crypt include artifacts such as pieces of the destroyed Pennsylvania Station and World Trade Center, as well as wooden angels, plaster gargoyles, leadlights, antique furniture, and a single-file line of saints. The crypt also includes objects such as a large fossil and a massive crystal of quartz, both of which were relocated to the crypt after the 2001 fire. Along either side the basement are rooms, each named after the chapels that they are located under. In the 1980s, the crypt was also home to the Cathedral Works Company, which sold textiles.

The crypt also formerly contained the Tiffany Chapel, created by jewelry designer Louis Comfort Tiffany. Originally exhibited at the World's Columbian Exposition in 1893, it was then acquired by Celia Whipple Wallace and moved to the cathedral in 1898. Services at the cathedral were hosted at the Tiffany Chapel from 1899 to 1911, and the chapel was reacquired by Tiffany in 1916. The chapel has been in the Charles Hosmer Morse Museum of American Art in Winter Park, Florida, since 1999.

A subbasement below the crypt is often flooded by groundwater, potentially from springs in the area. The Leake and Watts Asylum had a well on the site of the present-day baptistery, and there was a spring near the intersection of 110th Street and Morningside Drive. As early as 1893, workers discovered that the ground under the cathedral was soft and prone to flooding. As a result, the cathedral has a concrete foundation. Sump pumps keep the area dry, and construction of the neighboring Enclave has reduced flooding. However, the spring still exists underneath the cathedral, and water from the spring may have contributed to the partial collapse of a retaining wall in 2006.

== Cathedral close ==
Cathedral Close of St. John the Divine
1 Cathedral Church of St. John the Divine
2 Ithiel Town Building
3 Biblical Garden
4 The Cathedral School of St. John the Divine
5 Pulpit Green
6 Cathedral House/Ogilvie House
7 Synod Hall
8 Diocesan House

The cathedral close, surrounding the main cathedral, consists of several buildings on a 11.5-acre (4.7 ha) site, including the former Leake & Watts asylum building, which predates the land's acquisition by the Episcopal Diocese of New York. The other structures were built later.

The former asylum is located immediately south of the crossing. The Cathedral School of St. John the Divine is located on the eastern boundary of the site, just south of the apse. A Biblical garden is located between the school and the asylum building. To the southwest is a pulpit green, situated between the nave to the north and the Synod Hall and Diocesan House to the south. The Cathedral House is located south of the Biblical garden and east of the pulpit green. The Synod Hall and Diocesan House are located on the southern boundary. Various paths, gardens, play areas, and furniture are located on the cathedral close, as are numerous artworks and several commemorative or religious objects.

The initial plans for the cathedral close, put forth in the 1890s, varied widely. The included a 1892 plan for buildings on Morningside Drive and Cathedral Parkway; various proposals for an Episcopal residence somewhere along the close; and an 1898–1899 plan for a deaconesses' training school. Two other plans were proposed in 1902 and 1903, but after objections to the 1903 plan from St. Luke's Hospital, a new plan was presented in 1906. The Training School for Deaconesses was completed in 1909, independently of the plan. Cram presented to the trustees an extensive plan for all the structures on the grounds in October 1911, and the trustees approved the choir school the same month. The following month, the trustees certified plans for the Synod Hall, bishop's house, and deanery, as well as the never-built diocesan offices and canons' residences. A heating plant at the southwestern corner of the cathedral close (added to the plan in 1913), and two structures planned for the western boundary and approved in 1920, were not built. A shelter was built in 2015 for the cathedral's three peacocks, Jim, Phil, and Harry, who lived on the cathedral close from the early 2000s to 2023.

=== Ithiel Town Building ===
The former Leake and Watts Asylum building, designed by Ithiel Town and completed in 1843, is located south of the crossing, where the south transept would have been located. The building, designed in the Greek Revival style, was originally composed of five parts. There was a central pavilion with Ionic-style porticos to the south and north. The front entrance, located within the south portico, was approached by a wide granite staircase. The only decorative element was at the south portico's pediment, which was supported by six stucco-covered brick columns, topped by capitals made of wood. Brick wings flanked the central pavilion to each side, and originally contained wooden porches along their facades, replaced with iron balconies in 1888.

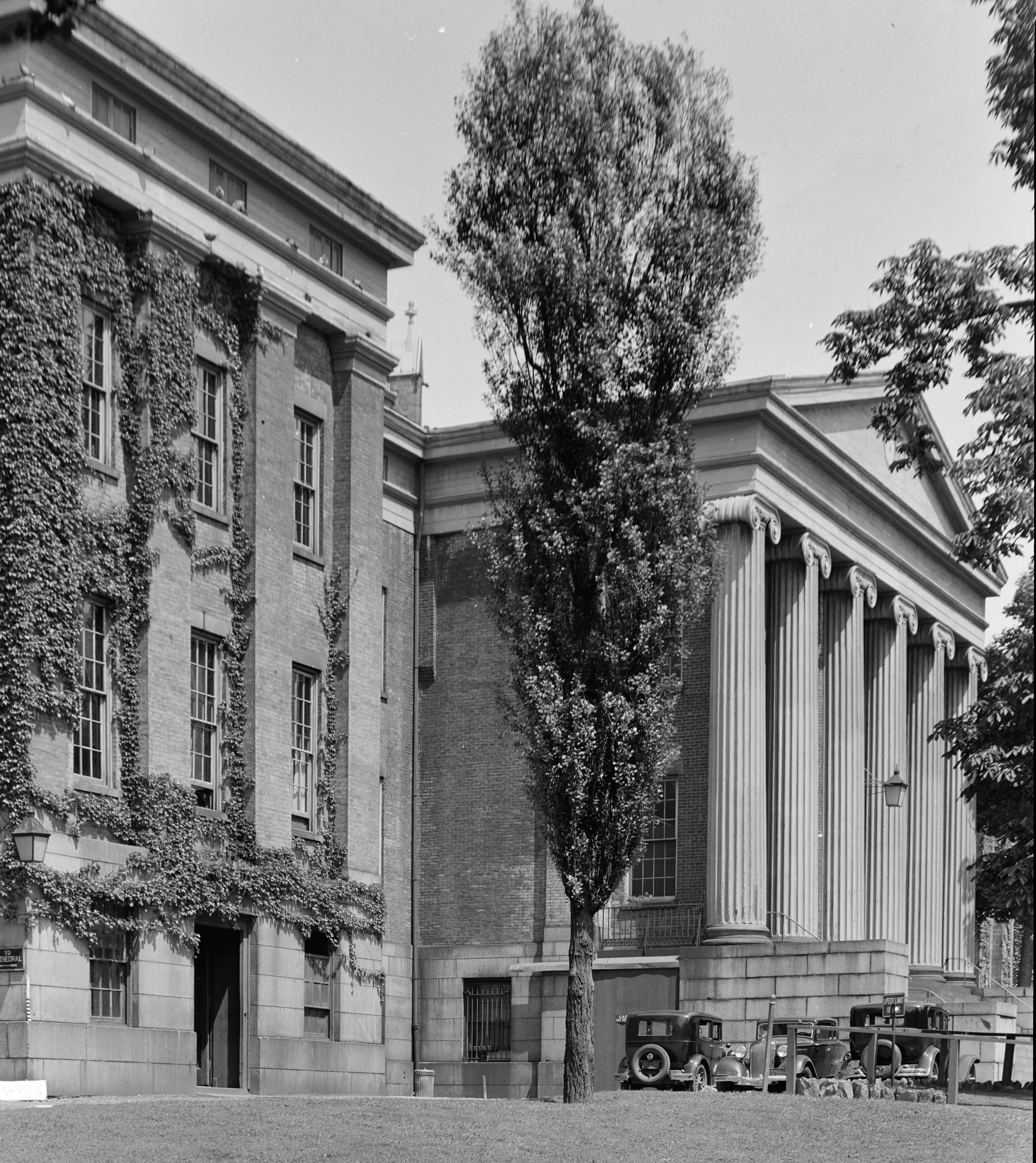
Ithiel Town Building (former orphanage) seen here in 1934

Originally, there were common areas and staff rooms within the central pavilion, and dormitories for 300 children in the wings. When the Episcopal Diocese of New York acquired the site, the former asylum building served several functions for the cathedral. Between 1892 and 1899, it was used as an employee dormitory and construction offices, while the parlor hosted worship services. Afterward, the former asylum's west wing was used by the day school for the cathedral's choirboys between 1901 and 1913. Cathedral leaders had proposed demolishing parts of the asylum building, since it was in the way of the proposed southern transept, though these demolitions did not happen. Subsequently, the west wing was used by the Diocese offices, and the east wing by Cathedral offices until 1949. The building then became the "Exhibit Hall" and the top stories were removed sometime afterward. The structure was renovated in 2004–2012, becoming the "Ithiel Town Building".

The Ithiel Town Building houses a textile laboratory that conserves the cathedral's textiles, including the Barberini tapestries to cartoons by Raphael. The laboratory also conserves tapestries, needlepoint, upholstery, costumes, and other textiles for its clients. The building has also housed the Museum of Religious Art, as well as offices, shops, choir rehearsal quarters, sacristies, and the Cathedral Community Cares program.

=== Diocesan House ===
The Diocesan House, also known as St. Faith's House, is the only building on the cathedral close to be designed by Heins & LaFarge before they were fired. The structure, designed in the Tudor Gothic style, is located on the southern side of the cathedral close, close to Cathedral Parkway (110th Street). It is a 3 1/2-story H-shaped building with a brick facade, a base of Indiana limestone, and gable roofs above the pavilions on the western end. The southern elevation also contains an additional basement story. Its main entrance, on the eastern portion of the northern elevation, is a recessed-arched portal with an oriel window on the third story. As of 2017, the Diocesan House is used by the diocese's offices and archives; the cathedral's library; and apartments.

The Diocesan House was originally built for the New York Training School for Deaconesses, which was established in 1890 and had been searching for new locations since 1898 or 1899. Funds to build the structure were finally received in 1907 after Archdeacon Charles Comfort Tiffany included $125,000 for the deaconesses' school in his will. The building was originally supposed to be on the northern side of the cathedral close, but was moved due to objections from St. Luke's Hospital. Construction started in May 1910 and the school opened by that October. All work was finished in February 1911, and the building was used as a deaconesses' school until May 1948, and it was converted to office use the following year.

=== Synod Hall ===
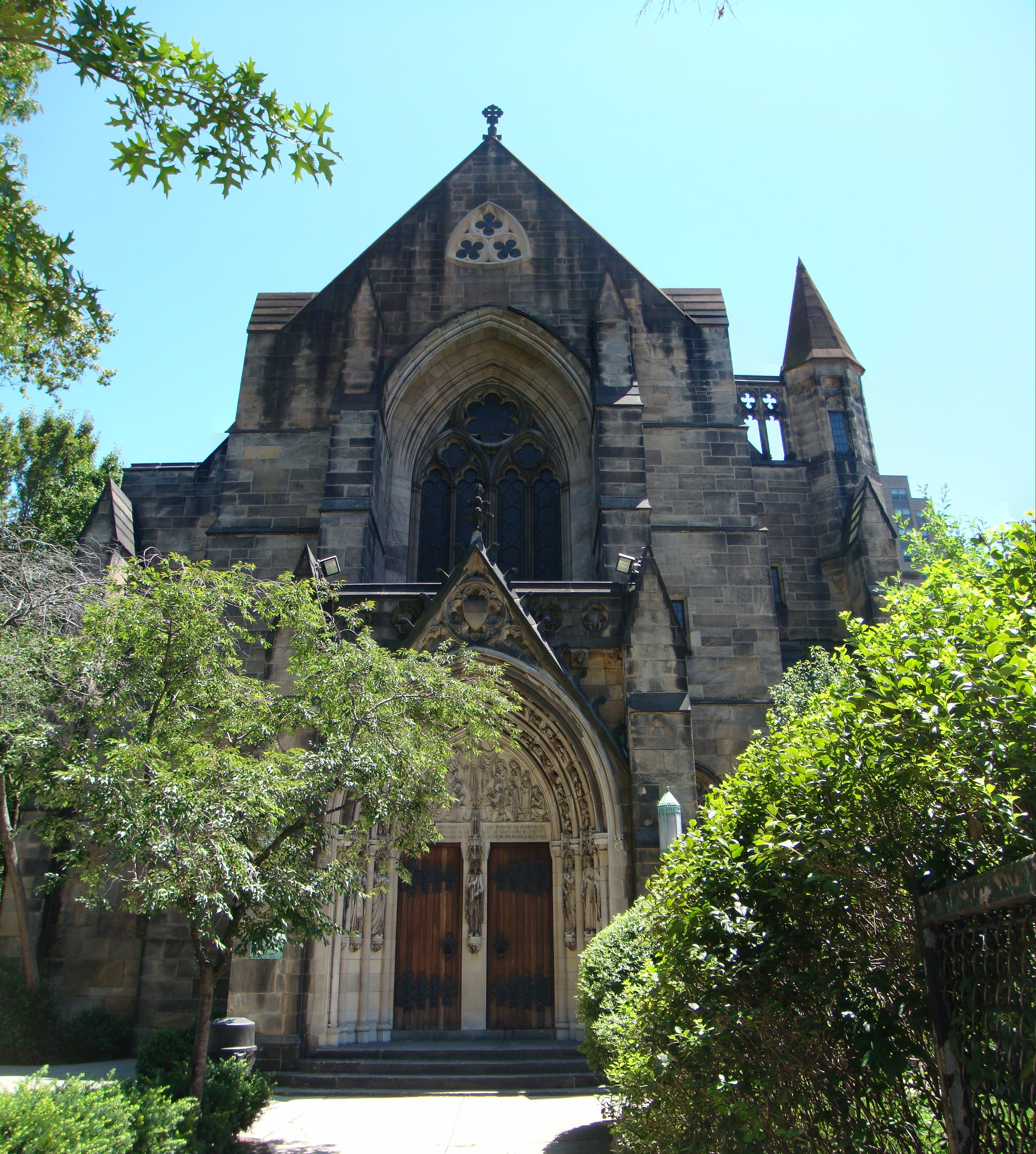
Synod Hall main entrance

The Synod Hall (also known as the Synod House) houses the cathedral's synod or council, but is also used for various events and other functions. It was completed in 1913 and was the first of four structures on the cathedral close to be designed by Cram, and was designed to be "the most beautiful thing in New York". It is located at the southwestern corner of the cathedral close. The main entrance, an arched portal facing Amsterdam Avenue, contains carvings of Christian figures, which flank oak double-doors. A carving of George Washington is located between the doors, and six smaller figures are located on the tympanum above the doors. The exterior is made of pink Kingwood sandstone. Inside is a hall that can seat over a thousand people, (Note: According to Dolkart 1998, p. 64, the space could fit 1,200 people. However, Quirk 1993, p. 147, says that the hall can only seat 1,000.) with gallery seating above the main level. There are grisaille windows to the north and south, and wooden trusses on the ceiling, supporting the gable roof. The Synod Hall also contains a three-manual Skinner pipe organ.

Plans for a diocesan building were considered as early as 1903. The current Synod Hall was announced in 1911, in preparation for the 1913 General Convention of the Episcopal Church. Cram's firm submitted plans for Synod Hall in March 1912, and it opened in October 1913 with the start of the convention. However, the hall was not completed until early 1914. After Bayard Cutting and J. P. Morgan made large donations toward the Synod Hall, the cathedral had to return some of the previous donations, as the two men had given more than enough funds to pay for the building.

=== School ===
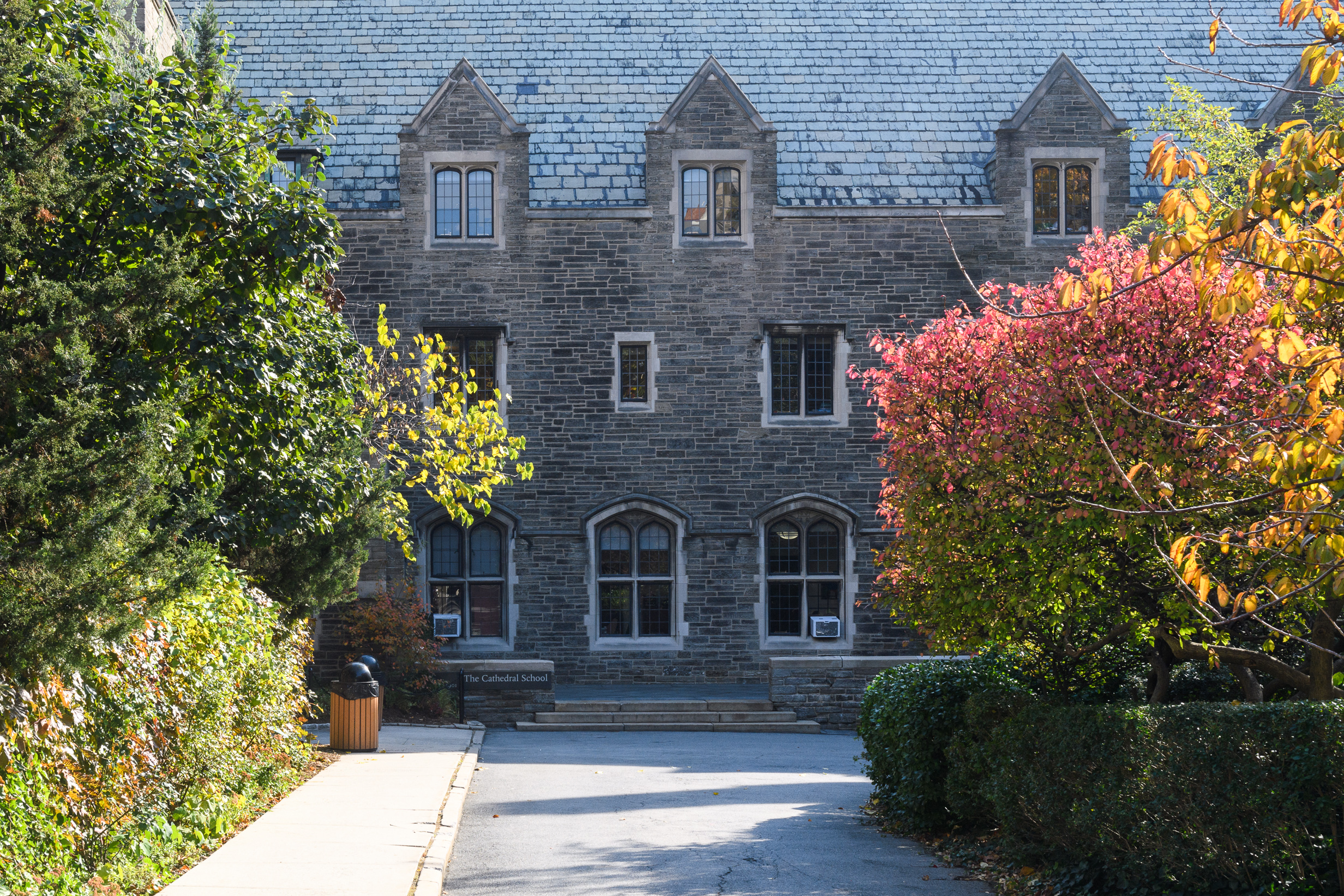
The Cathedral School of St. John the Divine

The choir school building, now the Cathedral School of St. John the Divine, is located on the cathedral close's eastern border. The building is in the Collegiate Gothic style and is 4 1/2 stories tall. The exterior contains gray schist cladding and limestone trim, with architectural features such as a gabled roof, dormers protruding from the roof, and Tudor-style arched openings. Inside, the building contained classrooms; gathering space for reception, dining; music rooms; a library; a gymnasium; a dormitory; and masters' and service rooms.

The choir school was created in 1901 within the Town Building. A separate structure was first proposed in Walter Cook & Winthrop A. Welch's 1906 plan for the campus. In January 1910, Mary Eliza Blodgett (alternatively Mrs. J. Jarrett Blodgett) donated $25,000 toward the new school building's projected $150,000 cost, as a gift to honor her father John H. Sherwood. Blodgett later covered the rest of the choir school building's cost after no one else donated, while former choirboy Frederick G. Bourne provided a $500,000 endowment in 1914. Cram approved Cook & Welch's plan in January 1912 and filed construction plans that July, with work beginning that October. The school building was finished in September 1913. The choir school consisted of day school for 20 adult men and a boarding school for 40 choirboys who paid no tuition. It was turned into a boys' day school in 1964 and a coeducational day school for grades K-8 in 1972.

=== Bishop's house and deanery ===
The Episcopal Residence, consisting of the bishop's house (also Cathedral House) and deanery (also Ogilvie House), were the final buildings that Cram designed within the cathedral close. The structures were intentionally built close together to evoke a feeling of coziness. According to Cram, the Chateauesque-style buildings were inspired by "later domestic" buildings in the French Gothic style. The bishop's house is west of the deanery, on slightly higher ground; the deanery is thus hidden behind the bishop's house. A small garden is located at the northeast corner of the buildings.

As built, the two structures contained a myriad of living space inside. The bishop's house contained eight rooms with seven bathrooms, while the deanery contained 20 rooms with five bathrooms. The deanery is three stories tall; like the choir school, it has gray schist cladding and limestone trim. It contains several pavilions with dormers and gabled roofs, as well as a loggia and an oriel window on the southern elevation. The bishop's house is four stories tall and is largely in the same design, but part of the northern elevation is made of exposed brick, marking the location where it would have connected to the unbuilt southern transept. The ornamentation of the bishop's house contains symbols of the diocesan offices, such as bishops; by contrast, the deanery has simpler decorations, such as depictions of flowers and cats. A private chapel between the two buildings was not built.

An episcopal residence had been announced in 1897 and Heins & LaFarge drew up plans for such a structure in 1902. The Deanery was donated by Helen Slade Ogilvie in 1911 in memory of her late husband Clinton, while the bishop's house was funded partly by the sale of a previous bishop's house at Gramercy Park. Initially, the site of the two structures was contested because the buildings would have blocked views of the main cathedral from the south. Before the structures' construction started in 1912, the sites for the bishop's house and deanery were relocated eastward. The two buildings' sites were given preliminary approval in May 1912 and were officially approved that October. The bishop's house started in November 1912 and was finished in April 1914. while the deanery was started in February 1913 and completed by that November. Both structures were erected by Leonard Jacob and Frederick T. Youngs. After the 1947 Diocesan Convention, the bishop moved into the upper two floors of the deanery, and the old bishop's house was turned into administration offices.

=== Residential buildings ===
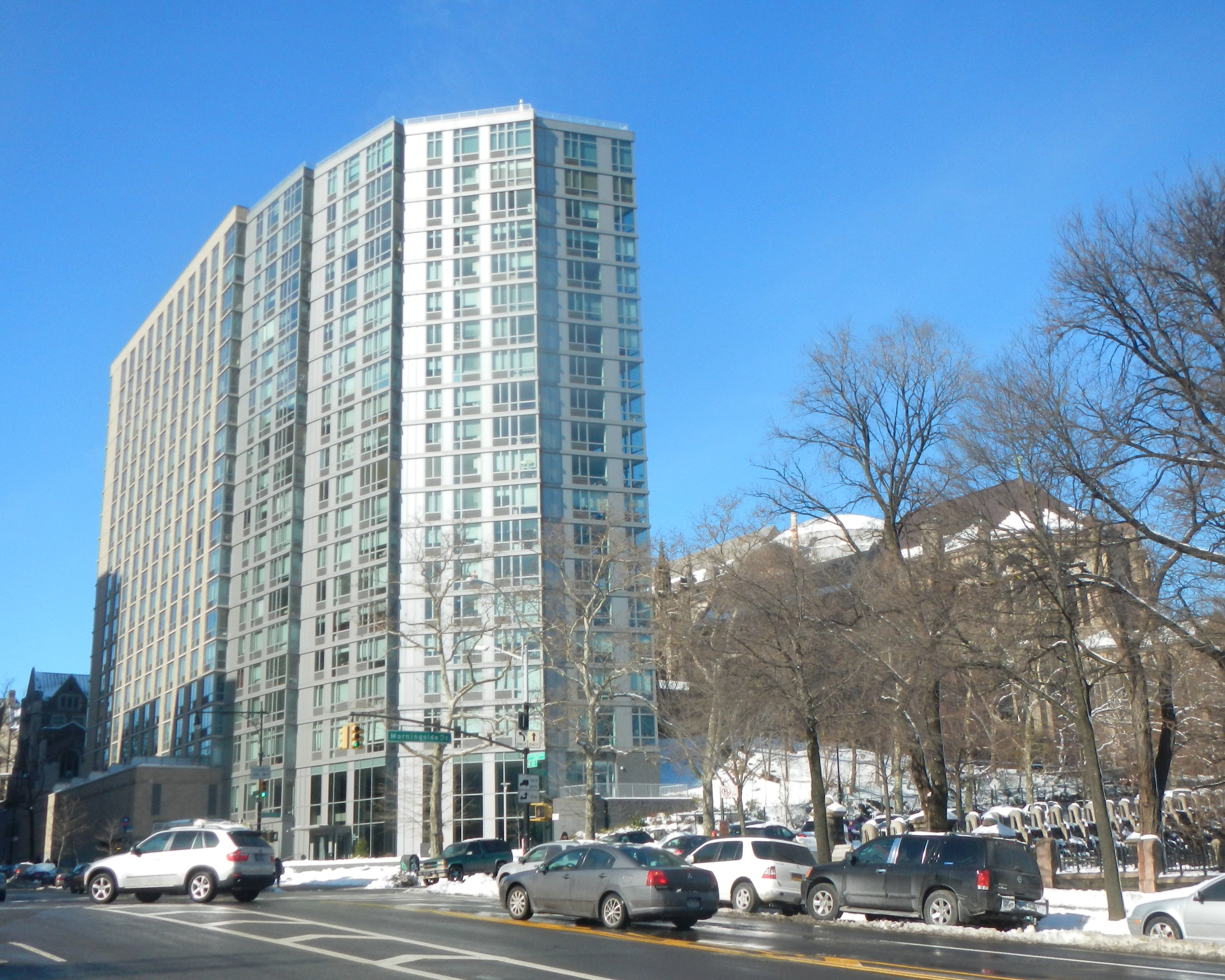
Avalon Morningside Park, built in 2007 on the southern portion of the cathedral close

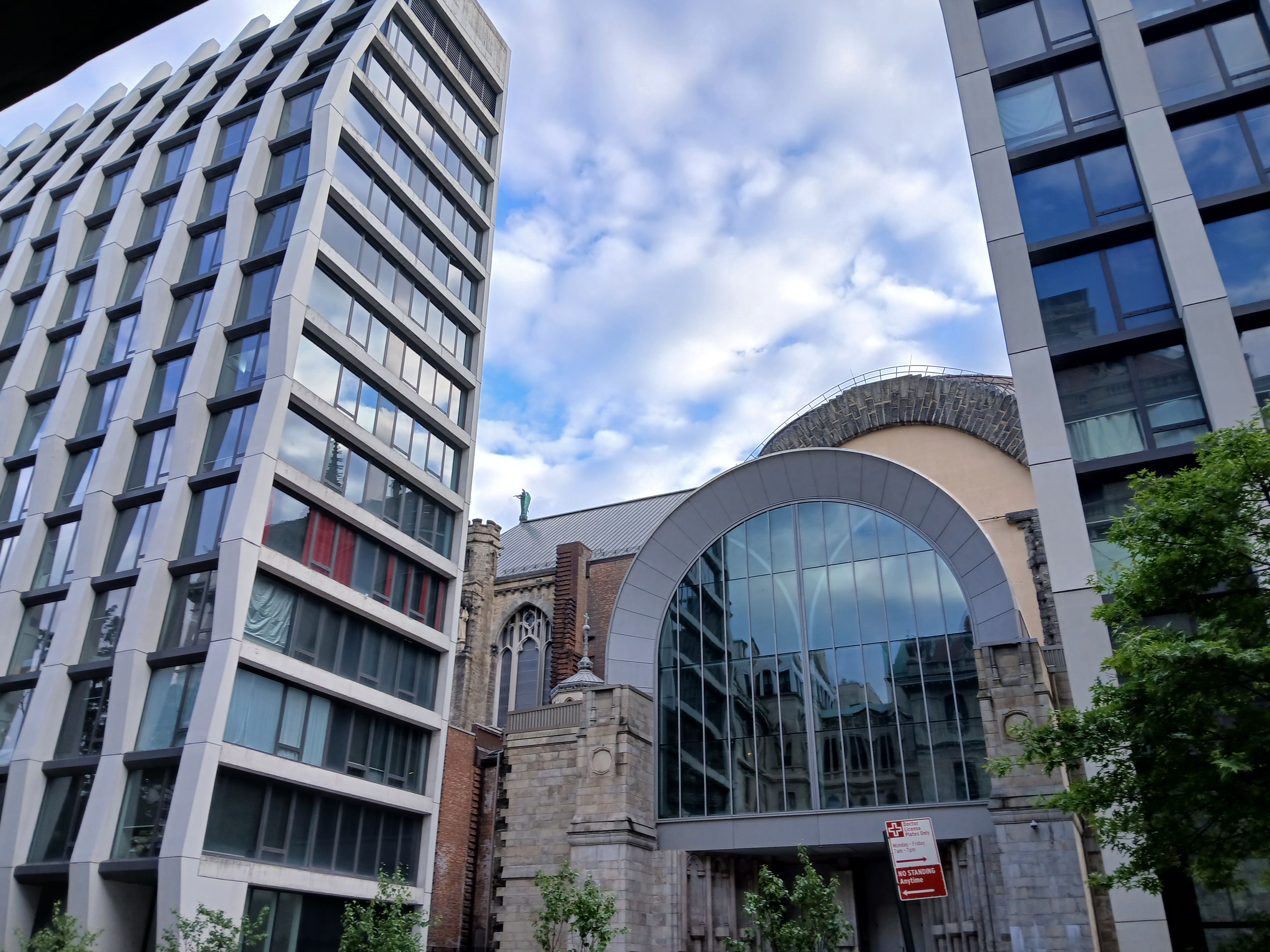
The Enclave, built in 2015 on the northern portion of the cathedral close, flanking the northern transept

In 2008, the cathedral leased the southeast corner of its property, which contained the cathedral's playground and Rose Garden, to the AvalonBay Communities, which built a luxury apartment building called the Avalon Morningside Park. The project includes 295 apartments, of which 20% are affordable housing units, as well as replacement rose garden. The cathedral leased out the northeastern edge of its property, formerly a parking lot, in 2012. The lessee was the Brodsky Organization, which built a residential building called the Enclave between 2014 and 2015. The Enclave consists of 428 rental apartments in two 15-story buildings, separated by the passageway leading to the northern transept; an underground gallery connects the two buildings.

Both developments originally leased the land from the cathedral for 99-year terms. The lease on the land under the Enclave paid the Cathedral about $3 million a year; the lease on the Avalon, about $2.5 million. The land under Avalon Morningside Heights was sold in December 2017 to the owner of the apartment complex for $95 million. In September 2019, the land under the Enclave was sold to Brodsky for $57 million.

== Art, activities, and exhibitions ==
=== Concerts and special events ===
The cathedral's interior is frequently used for concerts, performances, and other special events.

==== Recurring events ====
The cathedral has an annual New Year's Eve Concert for Peace. The Postlude to Act I of Leonard Bernstein's opera Quiet Place received its New York premiere at the 1985 concert. The 1990 concert was a tribute to Bernstein himself, who helped found the event and had died two months earlier on October 14.

The Paul Winter Consort, led by Paul Winter, are the artists in residence and have played an annual concert at the cathedral for the winter solstice since 1980. Among the major musical events that takes place every year is a celebration of the feast day of St. Francis, when the Paul Winter Consort participates in a liturgical performance of Winter's Missa Gaia (Earth Mass). The musical group also performs at the annual Winter Solstice program.

==== One-time events ====
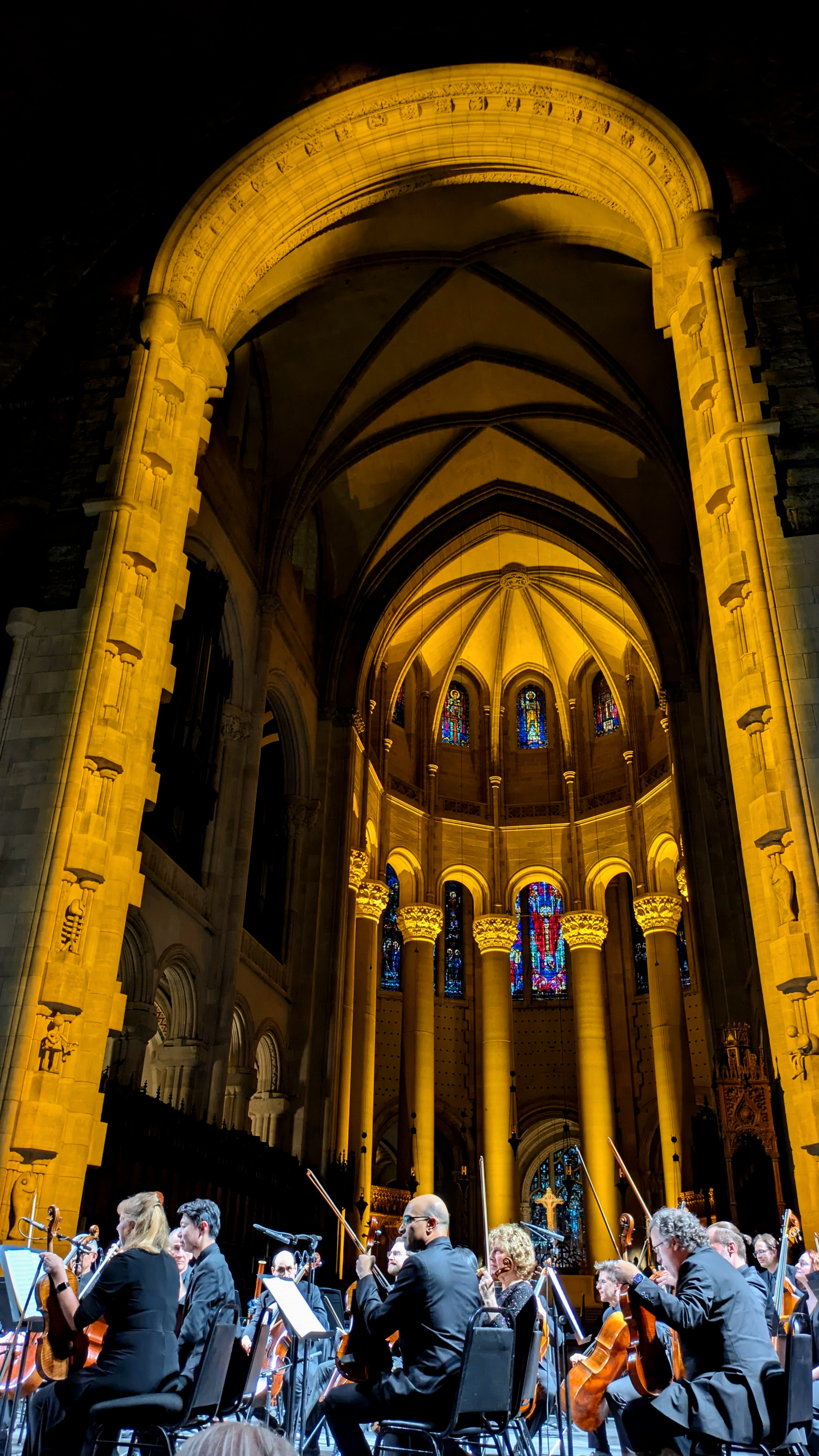
New York Philharmonic concert at Cathedral of St. John the Divine, 2026

The cathedral has also been used for several individual events:

- Duke Ellington's Second Sacred Concert, of his original sacred music compositions, premiered at the cathedral on January 19, 1968.
- When construction on the south tower restarted in 1982, French high-wire artist Philippe Petit walked on a tightrope stretched across Amsterdam Avenue. Petit was also the artist-in-residence at St. John's starting in 1982.
- In 1990, the avant-garde musician Diamanda Galas performed Plague Mass, a culmination of her work dedicated to the victims of the AIDS epidemic. Galas's performance consisted of covering her body in cattle blood and reinterpreting biblical texts and classic literature. She said it was a protest against what she saw as the ignorance and condemnation toward people with AIDS from religious and political groups.
- On December 8, 1994, Mariah Carey hosted a benefit concert for The Fresh Air Fund. The concert helped raise $700,000 to support the Fresh Air Fund and Carey's own Camp Mariah, and an additional $1 million from Carey herself.
- The wedding of Ethan Hawke and Uma Thurman took place at the cathedral on May 1, 1998.
- In November 2017, Aretha Franklin held her last large public concert, a 25th-anniversary event for the Elton John AIDS Foundation, at the cathedral.

The Cathedral of St. John the Divine has also hosted events with spiritual leaders. Among them are Tenzin Gyatso, the 14th Dalai Lama, who first visited the cathedral in 1979. In addition, Bishop Desmond Tutu led a service in the cathedral in 1986.

=== Temporary art exhibitions ===
The Cathedral of St. John the Divine is also used as an art exhibition space:

- In 1977, a sculpture dedicated to the 12 firemen who died in the 23rd Street Fire of 1966 was unveiled at St. John's.
- Edwina Sandys's Christa, a sculpture exhibited during Holy Week in 1984, was based upon the feminine divine. Though the sculpture generally received positive acclaim, several pieces of hate mail were addressed to the cathedral, accusing the cathedral of "blasphemy" with its depiction of Christ on the cross. The statue was displayed again at The Christa Project: Manifesting Divine Bodies exhibition in 2016.
- The Value of Water, curated by artist activist Fredericka Foster, was exhibited at the cathedral in 2011. Featuring over forty artists, it was the largest-ever art exhibition to appear at the cathedral.
- In 2014, the cathedral housed Phoenix, a sculptural group by Chinese artist Xu Bing. The two sculptures that comprised Phoenix was one of the largest pieces of sculpture ever displayed in the United States, weighing 12 short tons (11 long tons; 11 t) with lengths of 90 and 100 feet (27 and 30 m).

=== Poets' Corner ===
The Poets' Corner, inspired by a similar corner at Westminster Abbey, is located in the Arts Bay, on the nave's northern side. It was dedicated in 1985, with Emily Dickinson, Washington Irving, and Walt Whitman being the first poets to be inducted as part of the tradition. The Poets' Corner consists of a poet-in-residence, hired for a five-year term, who in turn appoints electors on staggered terms. The poets-in-residence and electors have included 17 United States Poet Laureates. The electors then vote on choices for honorees, whose names are carved into blocks in the Poets' Corner; subsequent honorees have included Edgar Allan Poe, T. S. Eliot, William Faulkner, and William Carlos Williams. The electors' choices can be overturned, as occurred in 1999, when the cathedral's dean, the Very Reverend Harry Pritchett, vetoed Ezra Pound's inclusion because of Pound's anti-Semitic statements during World War II.

=== Permanent works ===
Closeup of the Peace Fountain

The pulpit green contains the Peace Fountain, a large bronze work of public art by the cathedral's sculptor-in-residence, Greg Wyatt. It was commissioned in 1985 and depicts the struggle of good and evil; a battle between the Archangel Michael and Satan; and images of the Sun, the Moon, and several animals.

== Advocacy ==
Throughout the years, the Cathedral of St. John the Divine has been involved in various initiatives and projects. These programs included youth initiatives, a soup kitchen, a homeless shelter, and AIDS outreach. During the Vietnam War, the cathedral was also part of the opposition to United States involvement in the war. The Temple of Understanding, an interfaith organization, was housed at the cathedral for several decades in the late 20th century, moving to Midtown Manhattan in the 1990s.

Several programs have been directed toward helping members of the surrounding community. In 1971, the cathedral founded ACT (Athletics, Creativity, and Trips), a program that provided after-school activities and summer camp to children in the neighborhood. The program still runs as of 2018 under the name "Advancing the Community of Tomorrow". In 1974, in response to a need for housing in New York City, St. John's created a program that became the Urban Homesteading Assistance Board (UHAB); by 1987, the program had helped residential tenants in over 500 buildings to renovate and take ownership of their houses. Additionally, a homeless shelter, crisis center, clothes closet, and kitchen are run by in-house volunteers.

== Deans ==
- 1911–1916: William Mercer Grosvenor
- 1917–1929: Howard Chandler Robbins
- 1930–1939: Milo Hudson Gates
- 1940–1942: James Pernette DeWolfe
- 1942–1952: Vacant
- 1952–1958: James Albert Pike
- 1960–1966: John Vernon Butler
- 1966–1972: Vacant
- 1972–1997: James Parks Morton
- 1997–2001: Harry Houghton Pritchett Jr.
- 2002–2017: James August Kowalski
- 2018–2022: Clifton Daniel III
- 2022–2025: Patrick Malloy
- 2025–present: Winnie Varghese

== Notable funerals and memorials ==
The following people are listed with the year of their funeral or memorial service in parentheses:

- Alvin Ailey (memorial, 1989), choreographer
- Arthur Ashe (memorial, 1993), tennis player
- George Balanchine (funeral, 1983), choreographer
- James Baldwin (funeral, 1987), writer, activist
- Joseph Brodsky (funeral, 1996), poet
- Joan Didion (memorial, 2022), writer and journalist
- John Gregory Dunne (funeral, 2004), writer, journalist and husband of Joan Didion
- Duke Ellington (funeral, 1974), composer
- James Gandolfini (funeral, 2013), actor
- Dizzy Gillespie (funeral, 1993), musician
- Allen Ginsberg (funeral, 1998), poet
- Jim Henson (memorial, 1990), Muppets creator
- Trevor Huddleston (memorial, 1997), anti-apartheid activist
- Richard Hunt (funeral, 1992), Muppet performer
- Audre Lorde (funeral, 1993), poet, activist
- Toni Morrison (funeral, 2019), author
- Paul Moore Jr. (funeral, 2003), bishop
- Eleanor Roosevelt (memorial, 1962), activist, diplomat, U.S. First Lady
- Nikola Tesla (funeral, 1943), inventor
- Terence Tolbert (funeral, 2008), political operative

== Visitor access ==
In addition to worship services, the Cathedral of St. John the Divine offers both self-guided and guided tours of the interior exhibits, the cathedral close, and the gardens. These tours require paid tickets; there are discounts for seniors and students, as well as for those in tour groups. Admission is also included within several New York City tourist passes.

== Landmark status ==
The Cathedral of St. John the Divine complex had been considered for designation as an official landmark by the New York City Landmarks Preservation Commission in 1966. At the time, St. John's trustees had opposed the move because the structure was incomplete, and a landmark designation would have required the commission to review every proposed major expansion thereafter. The church's trustees were able to prevent designation by claiming the church was not completed, using a stipulation in the landmark's law that stated that potential landmarks had to have been completed for at least 30 years. A subsequent landmark designation was precluded in 1979 for a similar reason.

In 2003, the exterior of the cathedral was again considered for landmark status; the interior was ineligible because the commission was legally unable to recognize religious buildings' interiors as landmarks. However, shortly after the commission conferred landmark status on the structure, the designation was unanimously overturned by the New York City Council, some of whose members favored landmark status for the entire cathedral close instead of just the main building. Councilman Bill Perkins proposed that the protective status should also be extended to the cathedral's grounds in order to control development there. The lack of an official city landmark designation meant that the cathedral site could potentially be redeveloped, and as such, two residential buildings were built on the same block as the cathedral. In 2017, the cathedral and six other buildings on the grounds were re-designated a New York City Landmark; the designation excludes the two new structures.

== See also ==
- List of cathedrals in the United States
- List of New York City Designated Landmarks in Manhattan above 110th Street
- List of the Episcopal cathedrals of the United States
