= Chauncey Vibbard (steamboat) =

Hudson River steamboat built 1864

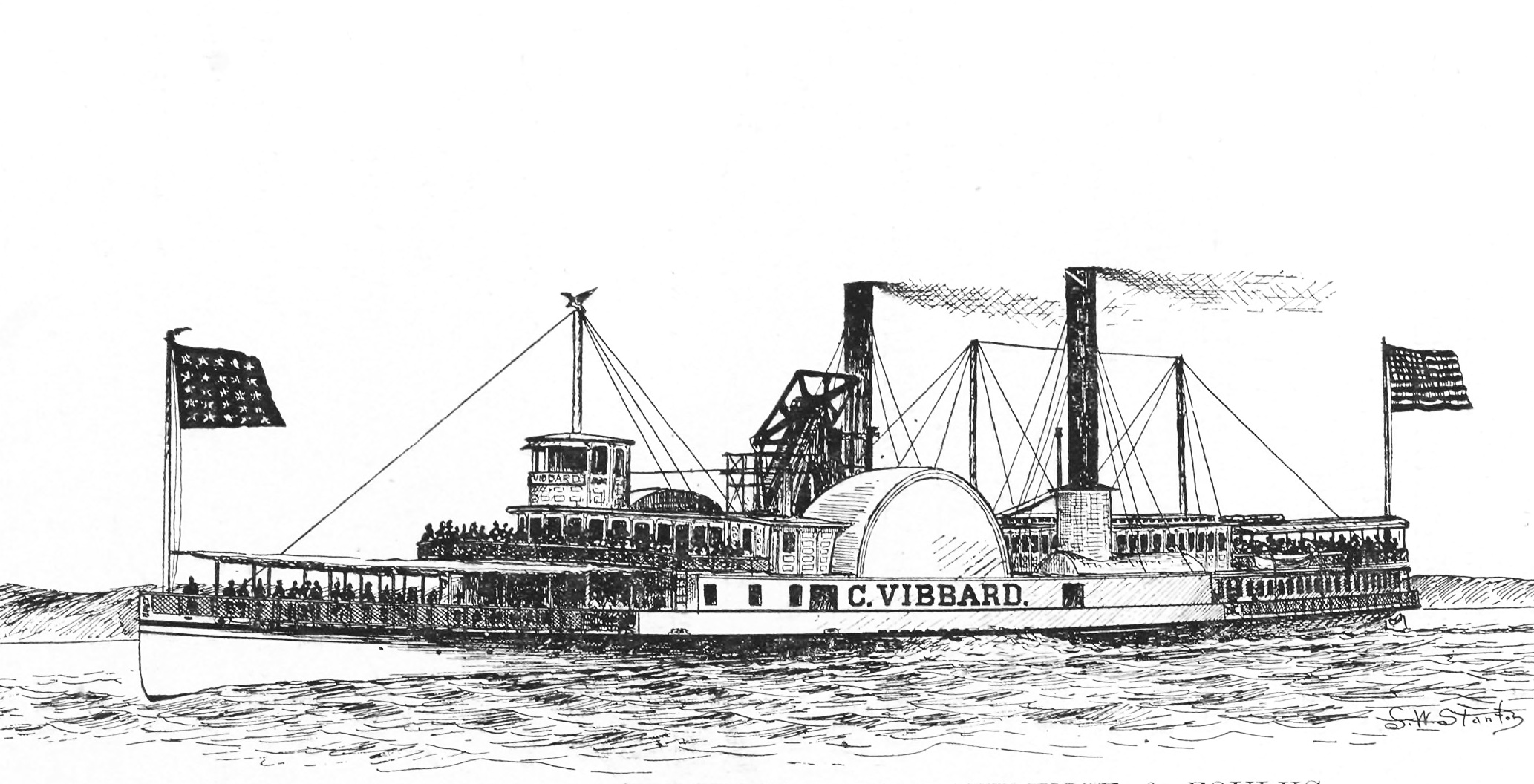
- Chauncey Vibbard prior to her 1880 rebuild

History
- Name: Chauncey Vibbard
- Namesake: Railroad executive Chauncey Vibbard
- Owner: 1864–65: A. Van Santvoord; 1865–79: A. Van Santvoord, J. McB. Davidson; 1879–90: Hudson River Day Line; 1890–93: Lincoln Steamboat Company; 1893–97: Lincoln Park and Steamboat Consolidated Co.; 1897–1900: The Everard Steamboat Co.
- Builder: Lawrence & Foulks (New York)
- Completed: 1864
- Maiden voyage: 20 June 1864
- In service: 1864–1900
- Out of service: 1900–1902
- Refit: 1866, 1872, 1880
- Fate: Broken up at Cramer's Hill, 1902

General characteristics
- Type: Passenger sidewheel steamboat
- Tonnage: 1864: 794 tons; 1866: 1,181 tons
- Length: 1864: 265 ft (81 m); 1866: 281 ft (86 m); 1872: 300 ft (91 m)
- Beam: 35 ft (11 m)
- Depth of hold: 9 ft 6 in (2.90 m)
- Propulsion: 1864: 1 x 55-inch bore, 12-foot stroke vertical beam steam engine; 1866: 1 x 62-inch bore, 12-foot stroke vertical beam steam engine; 30 foot diameter paddlewheels
- Speed: 23–25 mph (20–22 knots); top speed of around 28 mph (24 kn)
- Capacity: 2,000 passengers

Chauncey Vibbard, often abbreviated as C. Vibbard or just Vibbard, was a steamboat built in New York in 1864 for passenger service on the Hudson River. The first steamboat built specifically for what later became the Hudson River Day Line, Chauncey Vibbard quickly established herself as the fastest steamboat on the river, if not the world, with a record run from New York to Albany in 1864. Her popularity was such that after only two years of service she was lengthened to accommodate more passengers.

Chauncey Vibbard was lengthened again in 1872, but in spite of these alterations, continued to set a variety of new speed records on the Hudson until at least 1876. In 1880, she was given another major rebuild. In 1890, after 26 years' service on the Hudson, Chauncey Vibbard was sold to the Lincoln Steamboat Company, which ran her as an excursion steamer between Philadelphia and Lincoln Park. Laid up in 1900, she was broken up in 1902, having accumulated some 36 years of service.

== Construction and design ==
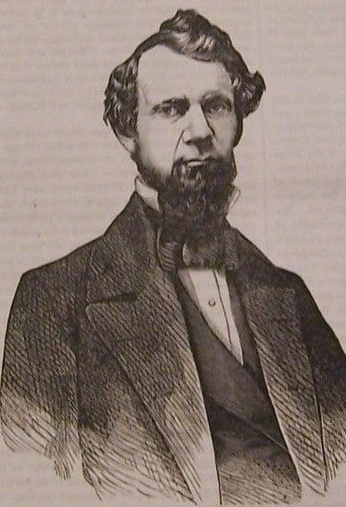
Chauncey Vibbard

After purchasing the steamboats Armenia and Daniel Drew in 1863 and running them on the Hudson for a number of months, Alfred Van Santvoord decided to build a new steamboat to operate in conjunction with Daniel Drew. Accordingly, a steamboat "with the same general arrangements and appearance" as Daniel Drew was ordered from the Williamsburg, New York shipyard of Lawrence & Foulks. Completed in early 1864, the new steamer was named Chauncey Vibbard after the prominent railroad executive, who at the time was one of Van Santvoord's partners.

When completed, Chauncey Vibbard had a length of 265 ft (81 m), beam of 35 ft (11 m), hold depth of 9 ft 6 in (2.90 m) and a tonnage of 794 tons. She was powered by a single cylinder vertical beam steam engine with 55 in (1.4 m) bore and 12 ft (3.7 m) stroke. Steam was supplied at a relatively high pressure of about 55 psi (380 kPa) by two boilers, one on each guard, just aft of the 30 ft (9.1 m) diameter paddlewheels. Both engine and boilers were supplied by Fletcher, Harrison & Co. of New Jersey.

With concave lines forward and convex aft and a narrow beam for her length, Chauncey Vibbard's hull was said "to cut the water as a knife blade, the water only breaking when it hit the paddles." To enhance the smoothness of operation, hull and boilers were balanced to eliminate vibration. With such "racer" lines and attention to detail, Chauncey Vibbard would have a cruising speed of 23 to 25 mph (20 to 22 kn; 37 to 40 km/h) and a top speed of almost 30 mph (26 kn; 48 km/h)—able to challenge other steamboats on the Hudson.

According to some sources, Chauncey Vibbard's hull was strengthened with high hog frames, typical hull strengthening components of their day. However, Stanton's illustration shows only king posts and iron tie-rods, suggesting that the hog frames were added at a later date, perhaps when the vessel was lengthened. In spite of her speed, Chauncey Vibbard is said to have been one of the most difficult boats to drive into a headwind.

As a day boat, a substantial proportion of Chauncey Vibbard's passengers were sightseers rather than travellers. To cater for this clientele, Chauncey Vibbard's main saloon was located forward, offering the best possible views of the Hudson's scenery. A promenade deck was also installed. There was also a very extensive larder—from which it was said almost anything could be ordered. Chauncey Vibbard's captain was Dave Hitchcock, a partner of Van Santvoord.

== Hudson River service, 1864–90 ==
=== Schedules ===
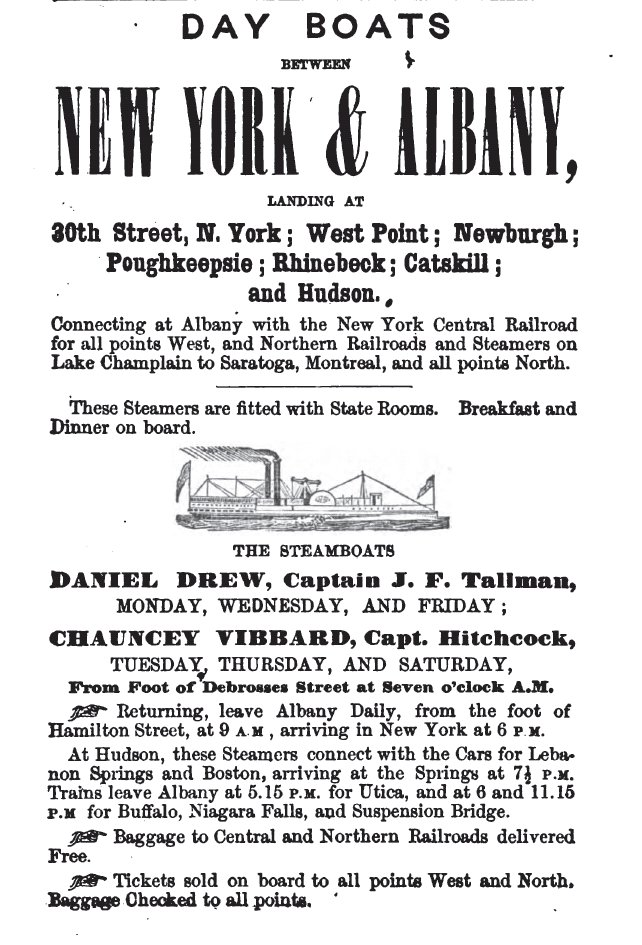
1864 advertisement for Chauncey Vibbard and Daniel Drew

After completion, Chauncey Vibbard was placed on the New York to Albany route, working in tandem with the Daniel Drew, while Daniel Drew's former partnering vessel, Armenia, was placed in reserve. Chauncey Vibbard was scheduled to leave New York for Albany on Tuesdays, Thursdays and Saturdays, while her stablemate departed the same port on Mondays, Wednesdays and Fridays. The boats departed Debrosses Street, New York on their respective days at 7:00 am, touching at 30th Street, New York, then continuing on to West Point, Newburgh, Poughkeepsie, Rhinebeck, Catskill, Hudson and Albany. The return journey for each boat was made the following day, departing Hamilton Street, Albany at 9:00 am and arriving at New York about 6:00 pm.

The schedule was arranged in such a way that when one boat was travelling downstream from Albany, the other was travelling upstream from New York. By this means, day travellers could alight at Poughkeepsie, the halfway point, and then return home the same day on the boat travelling in the opposite direction. This was known as the "nine-hour system" as each boat was scheduled to complete the trip between New York and Albany within nine hours. The service was only available from about May to October each year, with the boats being laid up for renovation during the winter months.

=== Early service and new record, 1864–65 ===
Chauncey Vibbard made her maiden voyage, from New York to Albany, on June 20, 1864. The same year, the vessel made the passage from New York to Albany in 6 hours 42 minutes, shaving eight minutes off the previous best time, set by her stablemate Daniel Drew in 1862. With a top speed of almost 30 mph in favorable conditions, Chauncey Vibbard was soon being spoken of as not just the fastest steamer on the Hudson, but as probably the fastest in the world.

In September 1865, Chauncey Vibbard made headlines over an incident that occurred on a passage from Albany. Two Kentuckians, who had "not rid themselves of secessionist sentiment", offended other passengers by drunkenly avowing themselves rebels, singing Confederate songs and cheering for General Robert E. Lee. The incident culminated in one of the two stabbing the chief colored waiter in the chest with a sword cane. Both offenders were jailed for "drunkenness and disorderly conduct" over the incident, and one charged with assault.

=== Reconstructions, 1865–66, 1871–72 ===
During the winter of 1865–66, Chauncey Vibbard underwent a major rebuild. The hull was cut in half just aft of the paddlewheels in order to lengthen the vessel by 16 ft (4.9 m) to 281 ft (86 m). A larger engine, a single-cylinder vertical beam with 62 in (1.6 m) bore and 12-foot stroke with a lower boiler pressure of 30 psi (210 kPa), was also installed. These changes, which increased the vessel's tonnage from 794 to 1,181 tons, were designed primarily to increase passenger capacity, but it was hoped that the new engine would allow Chauncey Vibbard to maintain if not improve her speed. Though some experts predicted that the rebuild would adversely affect her performance, Chauncey Vibbard quickly demonstrated otherwise when on June 4, 1866 she made a fast eight way-landing passage from New York to Albany of 7 hours 35 minutes.

In the winter of 1871–72, Chauncey Vibbard was reconstructed a second time. The vessel was lengthened again by about 20 ft (6.1 m) to 300 ft (91 m). New boilers, at a cost of $35,000, were also installed, and the interior, including the saloons, staterooms, dining room and ladies' boudoir were remodelled and fitted with new furniture. Total cost of the improvements was $75,000, lifting the vessel's total cost to $275,000. By this time, Vibbard's New York departure point had moved to Vestry Street, the departure time being 8:30 am.

=== Presidential trip and more records, 1870s ===
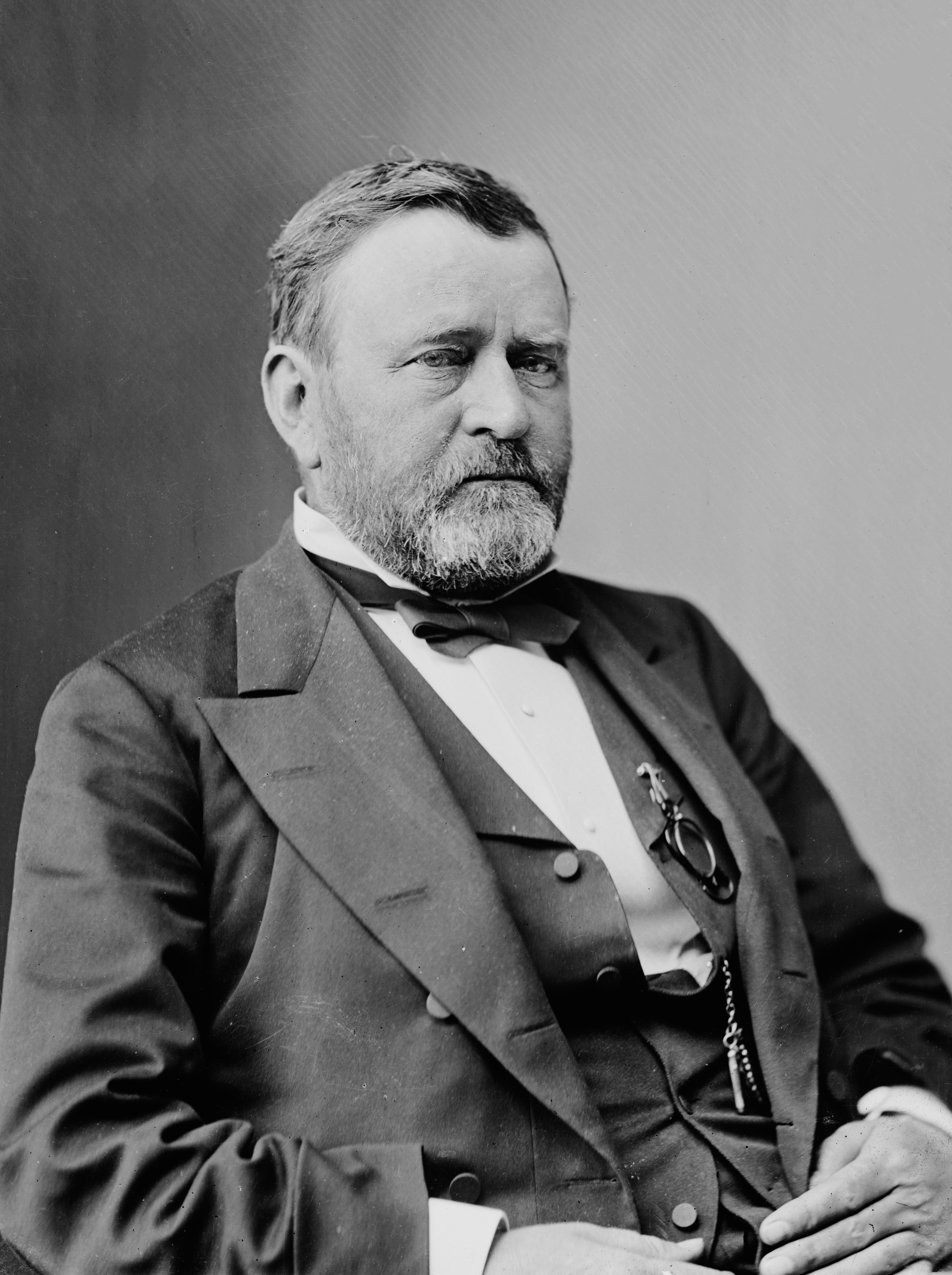
President Ulysses S. Grant was a passenger aboard Chauncey Vibbard in July 1873

A highlight of Chauncey Vibbard's career occurred in the 1873 season when President Ulysses S. Grant took passage on the vessel from New York to Rhinebeck. Apparently hoping to travel incognito, Grant boarded the steamer with only two companions, General Orville E. Babcock and an attaché to General George H. Sharpe, to whose residence the three were travelling before setting out on a sightseeing visit to Overlook Mountain. News of Grant's presence on the steamer quickly spread, however, and Grant soon found himself the subject of "a somewhat inconvenient scrutiny". Arriving at Rhinebeck, a large crowd gathered as Grant waited for the ferry Sandy, pressing forward to shake his hand. The rest of the President's journey was accompanied by cheering crowds, gun salutes, a marching band, the unfurling of flags and banners, and showers of flowers strewn along the route.

In 1875, Chauncey Vibbard broke the nine-landing speed record between New York and Albany by ten minutes, a record set 40 years earlier by the steamer South America.

Chauncey Vibbard's captain, Dave Hitchcock, still hoped for an opportunity to establish a new outright record. It came in early 1876, when Chauncey Vibbard was scheduled to be sent to Albany for repainting prior to the opening of the regular season, allowing for a direct passage from New York uninterrupted by way-landings. Chauncey Vibbard accordingly departed New York at 5:20 am on April 18, bearing a party of excursionists who had been promised the fastest steamboat ride they had ever experienced. They were not to be disappointed; in spite of less than ideal conditions, Chauncey Vibbard arrived at her Albany pier at 11:40 am, setting a new record time of 6 hours 20 minutes, eclipsing her own previous record of 6 hours 42 minutes, set a dozen years earlier, by no less than 22 minutes.

=== Accidents ===
Chauncey Vibbard's 26-year career on the Hudson was to remain remarkably free of accidents. The steamer was involved in a tragedy in 1876 however, when on August 30, while entering the slip at the foot of 24th Street, North River, about 6 pm, she collided with a small boat which crossed her bows. The two young men in the boat were thrown into the water, and one of them, an 18-year-old named William Koster, went missing and was presumed drowned.

Chauncey Vibbard suffered a rare mechanical breakdown on Monday, August 5, 1878, on a trip from Albany. Approaching the Poughkeepsie landing, her starboard paddle shaft broke. Her 400 passengers and their baggage were disembarked at Poughkeepsie, and a special train commissioned to enable them to complete their journey. Temporary repairs were meanwhile made to Chauncey Vibbard, allowing her to complete the passage to New York at a slow speed, where she arrived about 10 pm. Damage was estimated at between $2,000 and $2,500, and Chauncey Vibbard was laid up at the foot of 22nd Street New York for the installation of a new shaft, which was expected to take no more than a few days. To replace her during the repairs, the reserve steamer Armenia was quickly readied for service, a task which included the transfer of Chauncey Vibbard's bar fixtures and furniture. This breakdown was the first time in 13 years of service that Chauncey Vibbard had missed a scheduled trip.

=== Rebuild, reserve status and sale, 1880–1890 ===
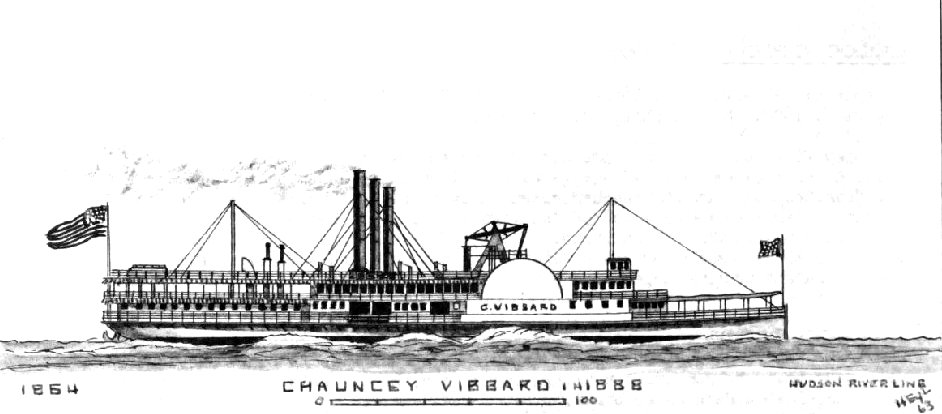
Chauncey Vibbard after her 1880 reconstruction. Erik Heyl drawing based on a painting by James Bard.

In the late 1870s, the Hudson River Day Line decided to replace the ageing Daniel Drew with a new steamboat. The new vessel, named Albany, debuted in 1880. Prior to the opening of the 1880 season, the company also decided to give Chauncey Vibbard another rebuild. The steamer's hog frames were removed, along with the boilers on the guards, which were replaced with three boilers in the hull, their three smokestacks running in a line athwartships in the same configuration as that of Albany. These changes not only radically altered Chauncey Vibbard's appearance, they also lost the fine balance between hull and boilers achieved by the original designers. However, they had the advantage of allowing the builders to "almost double" her passenger accommodations.

As late as 1881, Chauncey Vibbard was still being touted by the U.S. press as one of the three fastest boats on the Hudson, and as one of the four fastest in the world (the others named as the Hudson River steamers Albany, Mary Powell and Daniel Drew).

In late 1886, the Day Line's spare boat, Daniel Drew, was destroyed in a dockyard fire, prompting the company to order a new steamer. The new vessel, named New York, entered service in 1887, at which time Chauncey Vibbard became the Line's reserve boat. On July 30, 1890, after 26 years on the Hudson, Chauncey Vibbard was sold to Alfred B. Stoney of Keyport, New Jersey, for operation on the Delaware River.

== Later career, 1890–1902 ==
On August 5, 1890, Chauncey Vibbard's new owner, Alfred B. Stoney, transferred ownership of the vessel to his Lincoln Steamboat Company. For the next ten years, the vessel operated as an excursion steamer, running from Philadelphia to Lincoln Park, an amusement resort on the Delaware located between Philadelphia and Chester. Toward the end of this period, in the service of the Everard Steamboat Company, apparently a reorganization of the previous company, she was also used for frequent excursions to Cape May, and occasionally to the fishing grounds outside the Capes.

In 1899, a "Peace Jubilee" celebrating the end of the Spanish–American War took place, which included a naval parade on the Hudson, with Chauncey Vibbard as one of the participants. On the day of the parade, crowded with celebrity passengers, Chauncey Vibbard began leaking badly and was hastily beached on a sandbar. Not long thereafter, in 1900, Chauncey Vibbard was laid up by her proprietors. She was broken up at Cramer's Hill in 1902.

== Bibliography ==
Books

- Allison, Wm. L. (1864): The Working Farmer, November 1, 1864, p. 242, Wm. L. Allison, New York.
- Buckman, David Lear (1907): Old Steamboat Days on the Hudson River, pp. 65–66, The Grafton Press, New York.
- Dayton, Fred Erving (1925): Steamboat Days, p. 73, Frederick A. Stokes Company, New York.
- Disturnell, J. (1864): The Traveller's Guide to the Hudson River, p. 297, The American News Company, New York.
- Heyl, Erik (1964): Early American Steamers, Volume III, pp. 65–67, Erik Heyl, Buffalo, New York.
- Morrison, John Harrison (1903): History of American Steam Navigation, pp. 130–132, W. F. Sametz & Co., New York.
- Stone, Wm. L. (1868): History of New York City From The Discovery To The Present Day, p. 189, E. Cleave, New York.

Periodicals

- Chicago Daily Tribune
- Greene County News
- The New York Times

Websites

- "The Hudson River Day Line", Hudson River Maritime Museum website.
