= Lawrence & Foulks =

- Type: Private
- Industry: Shipbuilding
- Founded: 1852
- Founders: Herbert Lawrence Jr; William Foulks
- Defunct: 1902
- Fate: Closed
- Headquarters: Manhattan, NY (1852–54); Williamsburg, NY (1854–71); Greenpoint, NY (1871–1902); United States
- Products: Wooden-hulled steamships and other watercraft
- Services: Ship repairs
- Number of employees: 150 (1865)

Lawrence & Foulks was a 19th-century American shipbuilding company based in New York. Established in the early 1850s, the company built 144 vessels of all types over the course of some fifty years, but is best known for its production of high-speed wooden-hulled steamboats and steamships. Notable vessels built by the company include the record-breaking Hudson River steamboat Chauncey Vibbard, the luxury Long Island Sound steamer Commonwealth, and the fast oceangoing steamships—later U.S. Navy gunboats—Bienville and De Soto. In addition to the domestic market, the company also built ships for service as far afield as South America and China.

Lawrence & Foulks was one of the few New York shipyards to survive the post-Civil War slump, but was either unwilling or unable to make the postwar transition from wooden to iron shipbuilding, and closed its doors around the turn of the century.

== History ==
=== Origins, 1850–1854 ===
In 1849, William Foulks, a British-born ship's carpenter then aged 37, partnered with a young engineer named Humphrey Crary to build a steamboat in New York, which was named Catherine after Foulks' wife. Foulks received contracts to build several more vessels over the next two years. At this time, his shipyard was located at the foot of Cherry Street, Manhattan.

By 1852, Foulks had established a partnership with Herbert Lawrence, and the company was renamed Lawrence & Foulks. Lawrence, then barely in his twenties, was the son of Herbert Lawrence Sr., former co-proprietor of the prominent early New York shipbuilding firm of Lawrence & Sneden. By 1854, the Lawrence & Foulks shipyard had relocated to North Fifth Street, Williamsburg (now a part of Brooklyn), where it would remain for the next 17 years.

=== Plant, equipment and labor force ===
While the specific plant and equipment utilized by Lawrence & Foulks is not known, wooden shipbuilding firms in this era could be established for a remarkably small outlay—as little as $11,000, and rarely more than $20,000. Tradesmen at this time mostly supplied their own tools, so a shipyard needed little more than a waterfront property large enough to hold a timber yard and a slipway or two, a derrick to lift heavy components, a large crosscut saw and a few other tools.

Since New York was already well served by a number of existing marine engine plants, Lawrence & Foulks, like the other New York shipyards, had no need to establish an expensive engine plant of its own, but could rely upon outsourcing for its steamship engines. Companies which would build marine engines for Lawrence & Foulks prior to the Civil War included leading firms such as the Allaire Iron Works, Morgan Iron Works, Henry Esler & Co. and the Novelty Iron Works. After the war, when many of New York's marine engine manufacturers went out of business, Lawrence & Foulks appears to have come increasingly to rely upon New Jersey's Fletcher, Harrison & Co. to meet its machinery requirements. (Note: See the various individual entries in the ship table.)

As with other shipbuilders of the era, the size of Lawrence & Foulks' workforce could fluctuate greatly depending upon the available work. The company appears to have employed about 50 people for every ship under construction, and it was capable of building as many as four ships at once.

=== Early years, 1850s–1860 ===
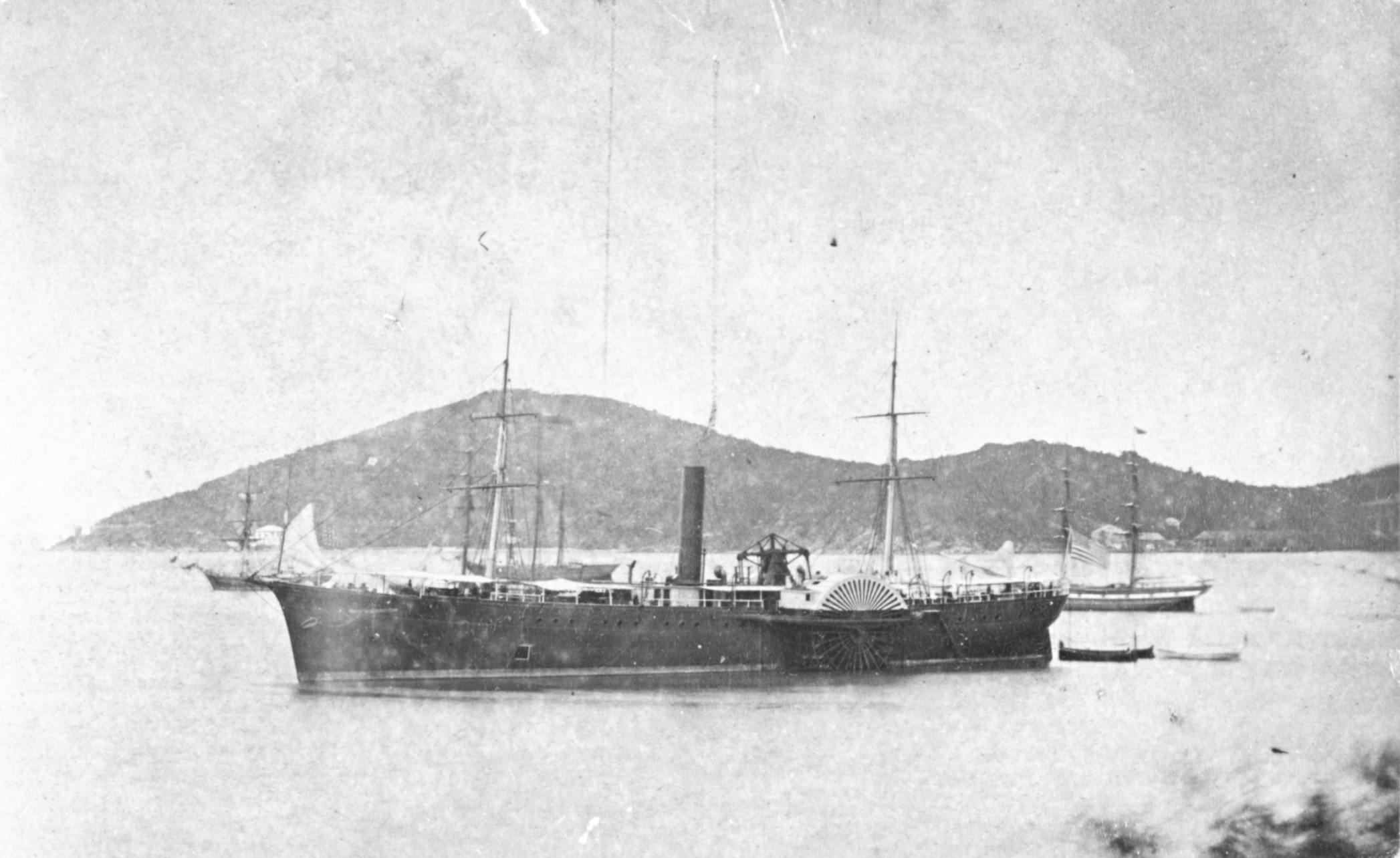
SS De Soto, built by Lawrence & Foulks in 1859. She served as USS De Soto during the Civil War.

Through the 1850s, Lawrence & Foulks built a number of steamers and other vessels for South American clients, including the 300-ton Spanish steamers General Concha and General Serrano for Cuban service; a large steamer for the Río de la Plata; and two small high-pressure riverboats for the Peruvian government destined for service on the Amazon. Two 1,300-ton steamers for Californian service were also completed.

In 1855, Lawrence & Foulks completed construction of the Long Island Sound steamer Commonwealth. Setting a new standard of elegance for Sound steamers, this large, lavishly outfitted steamer quickly became a favorite with the travelling public. In 1859–60, Lawrence & Foulks built the fast oceangoing steamships De Soto and Bienville, sister ships designed for passenger-cargo service between New York and New Orleans. Both vessels were later purchased by the U.S. Navy and would serve with distinction during the Civil War as gunboats.

=== American Civil War, 1861–1865 ===
With the outbreak of the Civil War, the U.S. Navy quickly purchased or chartered hundreds of ships from private steamship companies, which were needed to establish the blockade of Confederate ports and to transport troops and supplies along the Atlantic coast. The steamship companies were then obliged to return to the shipyards to replace their fleets, only to find themselves vying with the Navy which needed still more ships. The strong demand for new shipping created boom conditions for American shipyards which would last to the end of the war. New York shipyards in this period also benefited from the Treaty of Tianjin. Ratified in 1860, the treaty gave U.S. companies increased access to Chinese waterways and ports, which in turn stimulated demand for steamboats and steamships for Chinese service.

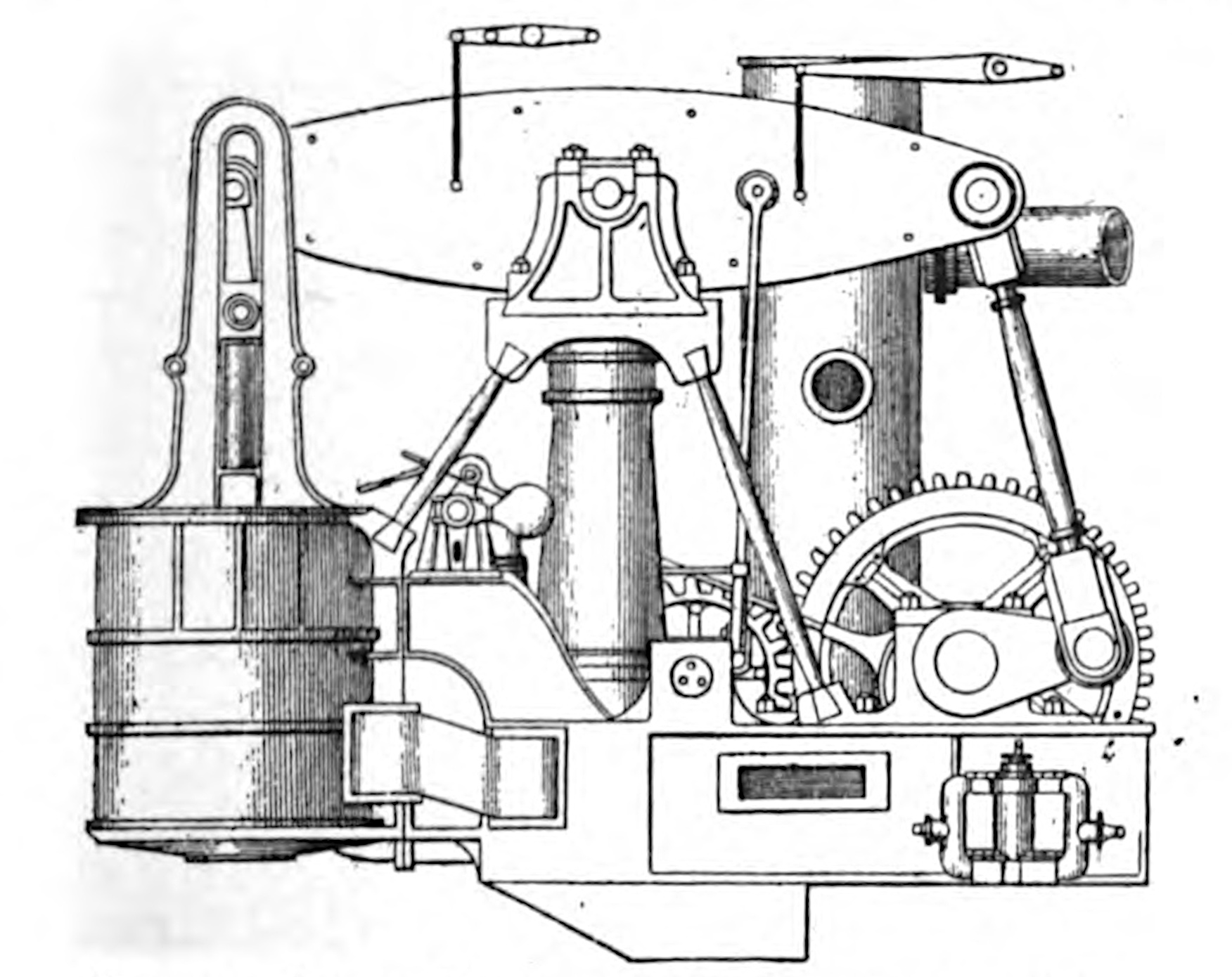
A beam-propeller engine. Lawrence & Foulks built a number of ships powered by such engines during the Civil War.

In 1861-62 Lawrence & Foulks completed at least three screw steamers for U.S. companies operating in China: Flambeau, Kiang-Tsze and Sze-Chuen. The latter two were duly despatched to China but Flambeau was purchased by the U.S. Navy to serve as the gunboat USS Flambeau. The company also completed a number of screw steamers for domestic American service during the war, including Isaac Smith, D. S. Miller and John L. Hasbrouck, all for Hudson River service. After a few months on the Hudson, Isaac Smith, like Flambeau, was requisitioned by the Navy for conversion into a gunboat. All the above-mentioned screw steamers were powered by beam-propeller engines—a transitional technology that mated the old, slow-rpm beam engine with the screw propeller by mounting the engine athwartships and gearing it up (at a ratio of one to three or more) to the propeller shaft.

Another newly built Lawrence & Foulks ship to be requisitioned by the Navy at this time was the small sidewheel steamer Thomas Freeborn. In an attack on Mathias Point, Virginia on 27 June 1861, Thomas Freeborn's commander, James H. Ward, became the first U.S. Navy officer killed in action in the war.

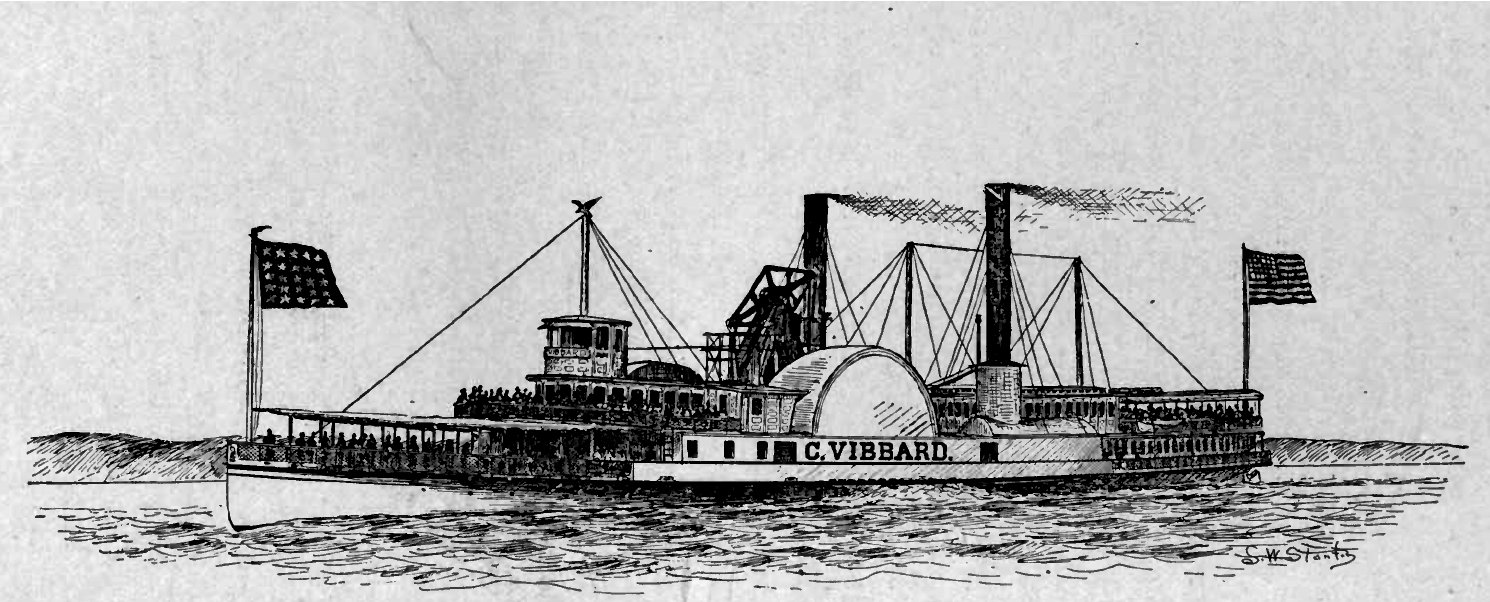
Chauncey Vibbard, built in 1864, was the fastest steamboat on the Hudson

In 1864, Lawrence & Foulks completed the Hudson River steamboat Chauncey Vibbard. Soon after entering service, the 280-foot vessel proved to be the fastest steamer on the highly competitive route from New York to Albany, making the trip in a new record time of 6 hours 42 minutes. With boilers carefully balanced to eliminate vibration, and a hull said to "cut the water as a knife blade", Chauncey Vibbard helped establish a reputation for Lawrence & Foulks as America's leading designers of high-speed watercraft.

=== Postwar slump, 1865–1870 ===
With the end of the war in April 1865, the U.S. shipbuilding industry experienced a severe downturn. The Navy dumped more than a million tons of unwanted shipping onto the market, depressing prices and leaving shipyards with no work. High postwar prices, along with a series of bitter (and unsuccessful) strikes for the eight-hour day, helped prolong the slump to the end of the decade. The slump had a devastating effect on the New York shipbuilding industry, with most of the city's shipbuilders and marine engine manufacturers going out of business in this period.

Lawrence & Foulks was one of only a handful of New York shipyards to survive the prolonged slump, aided in part by a flurry of orders in 1864-65. Livingston, Fox & Co., preparing to resume its prewar New York to New Orleans service, ordered a total of six sub-1000 ton steamers from Lawrence & Foulks in this period, including Herman Livingston, General J. K. Barnes and the four sister ships Albermarle, Hatteras, Raleigh and Rapidan. Two large 1,300 ton steamers, Vera Cruz and Manhattan, were also built in 1865 for Charles A. Whitney's American and Mexican Mail Steamship Company. In 1866, Lawrence & Foulks built the 2,200-ton steamship Oregonian for Californian service—probably the largest steamship ever built by the company.

By 1869 the slump had reached its nadir. Lawrence & Foulks managed to secure a couple of contracts early in the year, for the ferry Sylvan Glen and a small 100-ton steamer, but by September, only one vessel was under construction in the whole of New York.

=== Recovery, 1871–1873 ===
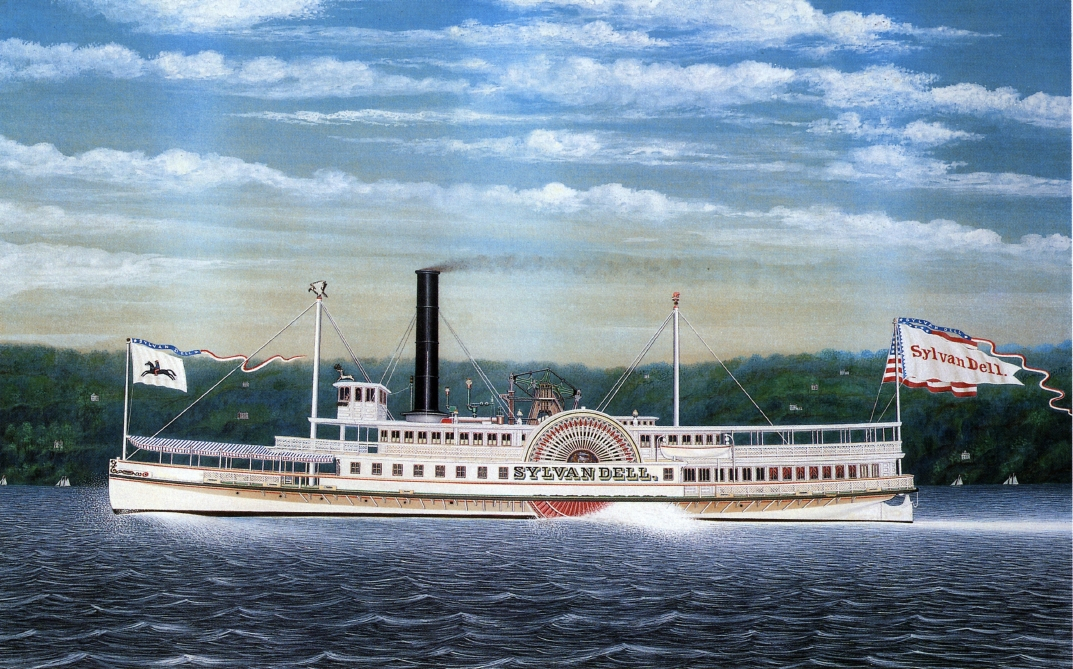
The "remarkably handsome" ferry Sylvan Dell, built by Lawrence & Foulks in 1872

The long postwar slump finally ended in 1871, as shipowners began to return to U.S. shipyards to replace their ageing fleets. In April 1871, after almost twenty years at Williamsburg, Lawrence & Foulks relocated their shipyard to the foot of Noble Street, Greenpoint, on the site of E. S. Whitlock's former shipyard, who like many others had retired from the business after the war. The shipyard had a frontage of 200 feet (61 m) along the river and 500 feet (150 m) on land.

From 1871 to 1873, New York shipyards remained busy. By this time however, the larger steamship contracts were going to the builders of iron-hulled ships on the Delaware—to firms such as John Roach & Sons, William Cramp & Sons, and Harlan and Hollingsworth—leaving New York shipbuilders to fulfill contracts for smaller vessels such as ferries, commuter and excursion steamers, steam yachts and tugboats.

Lawrence & Foulks secured a substantial number of such contracts in this period. A notable example was Sylvan Dell, a ferry built for the Harlem & New York Navigation Company. With a speed in excess of 20 mph, Sylvan Dell was New York Harbor's fastest vessel in her class, and remained popular with the public for many years, eventually being dubbed "Queen of New York Harbor". In 1873, Lawrence & Foulks built Jennie Stout—the first schooner built in New York since the war, and the largest three-masted schooner built there to that date.

=== Decline and closure, 1873–1902 ===
The brief early 1870s boom came to an abrupt end with the Panic of 1873. The subsequent recession would drag on until 1879, but by 1875 there was a widespread recognition that this time there would be no recovery for New York shipyards. Not only were the iron shipbuilders of the Delaware now dominating the contracts for larger ships, but the locus of wooden shipbuilding in the U.S. had moved to the state of Maine, where lower prices for timber, and lower wages, enabled the construction of wooden-hulled vessels as much as 20% cheaper than in New York.

The extent of New York's decline as a shipbuilding center from 1873 is well illustrated by the fortunes of Lawrence & Foulks itself. In the 24 years from 1851 to 1875, Lawrence & Foulks built a total of 122 vessels, an average of more than five per year. In the firm's remaining 25 years, from 1876 to 1901, it built only another 22 vessels, an average of less than one per year. (Note: The firm built a total of 144 ships according to The New York Times. Subtracting the 122 ships reportedly built to 1875 yields a total of 22 ships built between 1876 and 1901.) Among the latter were San Rafael and Saucelito, sister ferries built in 1877 which were shipped overland in pieces to San Francisco. After reassembly, the two vessels quickly established themselves as the fastest ferries on the Bay.

Among the last notable steamers built by Lawrence & Foulks were Albertina, built in 1882 for the Red Bank Line, and the steam yacht Clermont for Commodore Alfred van Santvoord of the New York and Albany Line. In August 1886, William Foulks fell from scaffolding while inspecting a vessel at his shipyard, suffering internal injuries. He died at home, aged 74, a few days later. His partner, Herbert Lawrence, retired in about 1894, but maintained his office in Greenpoint until shortly before he died, aged 73, in 1902. In total, the Lawrence & Foulks shipyard built 144 vessels of all types in the fifty years to 1901.

== List of ships ==
The first table below lists ships known to have been built by William Foulks, probably before his partnership with Herbert Lawrence. The second table lists ships built by Lawrence & Foulks. The two lists combined currently represent 112 of the 144 ships known to have been built by Foulks alone or by Lawrence & Foulks. In addition to the ships listed below, Lawrence & Foulks also designed the model for the Hudson River steamer Albany, but as she had an iron hull the construction contract went to Harlan and Hollingsworth.

Vessels which had more than one name during their career have their later names listed below the original name, followed (where available) by a two-digit number representing the last two digits of the year in which the rename took place. For other abbreviations, see the linked notes in the table column headers.

Ships built by William Foulks, 1850–1852
Name (Note: Name=name of ship. Where a ship had more than one name in its career, subsequent names are listed in order, followed by a two-digit figure representing the last two digits of the year the vessel was renamed where available.)	Type	Built (Note: Built = year of ship launch, where available, or else year of completion.)	Ton. (Note: Ton. = tonnage of ship.)	Engine (Note: Engine = engine manufacturer. Manufacturers include: Allaire = Allaire Iron Works; Birbecks = Birbecks & Hodges; Burdon = Burdon Iron Works; Esler= Henry Esler & Co.; Fletcher = Fletcher, Harrison & Co.; Fulton = Fulton Iron Works; Hubbard = Hubbard & Allen; Morgan = Morgan Iron Works; Neafie = Neafie & Levy; Novelty = Novelty Iron Works; Polly = Frank Polly; Secor = Sam Secor & Co.; Stanton = Stanton & Mallory; Sullivan = Sullivan & Boyd.)	Ordered by (Note: Party which ordered the ship. Abbreviations in this column include: FC = Ferry Company; R/RR/RRC = Railroad Company; SBC = Steamboat Company; SNC = Steam Navigation Company; SSC = Steamship Company.)	Intended service	Notes
Catherine	Steamboat	1850					Built in partnership with Humphrey Crary and named after Foulks' wife.
	Schooner	1851	76	——	Mexican Govt.	Mexico	
	Schooner	1851	76	——	Mexican Govt.	Mexico	
Peter Crary; Hazel Kirke; Naiad	Tugboat	1852			Reuben Coffin and others	New York Harbor	Abandoned 1919

Ships built by Lawrence & Foulks, 1852–1901
Name	Type	Built	Ton.	Engine	Ordered by	Intended service	Notes
	Ferry	1852	500		George Law	New York Harbor	"to run in the People's Ferry to Staten Island"
	Ferry	1852		Allaire		New York	"for Green Point"
	Ferry	1852		Allaire		New York	"for the Houston street ferry"
	Ferry	1852		Allaire		New York	"for the Williamsburgh ferry"
	Steamship	1852		Allaire	"Capt. Day"	Gulf of Mexico	
Josephine; Henry E. Bishop	Ferry	1852			Tompkinsville & Stapleton FC	New York	
Joseph Johnson	Towboat	1852	240		Parks & Duvall	New York Harbor	
	Steamer	1853	>1300			Rio de la Plata	
	Steamer	1853	1300			California	
	Steamer	1853	1300			California	
	Riverboat	1853	120	Fulton	Peruvian Govt	Amazon River	
	Riverboat	1853	80	Fulton	Peruvian Govt	Amazon River	
J. S. Underhill	Tugboat	1853					
William H. Brown	Steamboat	1853	450				
	Schooner	1853	34	——	U.S. Govt	Texas	"to serve as a United States Tender for carrying men, provisions, &c., on the rivers of Texas."
North Point	Schooner	1854	350	——	Johnson & Co,		"Southern trade"
Jack Travis	Schooner	1854	50	——			
Henry Munsi	Towboat	1854	150		A. O. Jackson		"Harbor towing"
H. Morrison	Steamboat	1854	150		A. O. Jackson		"[for] towing"
Gerard Stuyvesant	Ferry	1854	450			New York	Houston St. ferry
Neptune	Steamboat	1854	160		Peter Crany	Boston Harbor	
Surprise	Steamer	1854	456		Edgar Wakeman	Pacific Coast	
Commonwealth	Steamboat	1855	1732	Morgan	Norwich & New London SBC	Long Island Sound	Destroyed by fire at Groton, CT, 1865
E. H. White	Lighter	1855	100		Fancher & McChesney		
	Ferry	1855	550				"for the ferry connecting Catherine street, New York, with South Tenth st., Williamsburgh."
	Ferry	1855	550				"for the ferry connecting Catherine street, New York, with South Tenth st., Williamsburgh."
H. Delafield	Brig	1855	250	——	Henry Delafield		"will be employed in trading with Port-au-Prince".
Know Nothing	Towboat	1856	300		NY & Williamsburgh SBC	NY Harbor	"to be employed in towing about the harbor."
Corilla	Bark	1856	600	——	Johnson & Lowden		"for the South American trade"
John Farrow	Steamship	1856	500				"for a New York company"
James A. Stevens	Tugboat	1856	100		Palmer & Crary	New York	
	Tugboat	1857	100		Peter Crary	New York	
	Tugboat	1857	100		Roy, Coffin & Co	New York?	
	Steamer	1857	300		"Captain Porter"	New Orleans—Mobile	
General Concha	Steamer	1857	300	Birkbecks	Spanish Govt.	Cuba	
General Serrano	Steamer	1857?	300		Spanish Govt.	Cuba	
	Schooner	1858	150	——	Spanish Govt.	Cuba	For dredging Matanzas harbor
	Schooner	1858	150	——	Spanish Govt.	Cuba	For dredging Matanzas harbor
	Schooner	1858	150	——	Spanish Govt.	Cuba	For dredging Matanzas harbor
	Screw tender	1859		Delameter		New York Harbor	"intended as a tender for the new fort at Sandy Hook"
	Tugboat	1859			Oatey, Squires & Co		145 ft tug, probably for New York service
	Ferry	1859	60			Havana, Cuba	
De Soto	Steamship	1859	1675	Morgan	Livingston, Crocheron & Co.	NY–New Orleans	USN gunboat, 1861-68. Destroyed by fire south of New Orleans, 1870
Bienville	Steamship	1860	1558	Morgan	Livingston, Crocheron & Co.	NY–New Orleans	USN gunboat 1861-65. Destroyed by fire at sea off Bahamas 1872, 41 killed
Thomas Freeborn	Tugboat	1860		Allaire	Richard M. Squires	New York?	USN gunboat 1861–65. Her commander James H. Ward was first USN officer killed in Civil War.
William Foulks; Venezuela	Steamer	1859	293		Dallett & Bliss		Sold to Venezuelan Navy, 1860
Flambeau	Propeller	1861	791	Esler	P. S. Forbes & Co	China	USN gunboat 1861-65. Grounded, wrecked at New Inlet, N.C. 1867
Isaac Smith; CSS Stono ^{63}	Propeller	1861	453?	Fletcher	Hamilton & Smith	Hudson River	USN gunboat 1861-63. Captured by Confederacy 1863, renamed Stono, fate uncertain
	Propeller	1862	160	Polly	Carey & Co.		
	Propeller	1862	160	Polly	Carey & Co.		
	Propeller	1862	160	Polly	Bronder & Borlis		
D. S. Miller; Poughkeepsie	Propeller	1862	593	Fletcher	Hamilton & Smith	Hudson River	
James F. Freeborn; USS Nansemond ^{63}; USRC Nansemond ^{65}; USRC W. H. Crawford ^{84?}	Steamer	1862	380	Fletcher	Richard M. Squires et al		USN gunboat, 1863–65, revenue cutter 1865-97. Sold 1897.
John S. Williams	Propeller	1862	170	Stanton	B. U. Crary	New York Harbor	
Paquete de Maule	Steamer	1862	400	Novelty	G. K. Stevenson & Co	Chile	Gunboat during Chincha Islands War, captured and scuttled by Spain, 1866
Kiang-Tsze	Propeller	1863	1100	Esler	P. S. Forbes & Co	China	
Sze-Chuen	Propeller	1863	1090	Esler	P. S. Forbes & Co	Yangtze R., China	
John L. Hasbrouck; Marlboro	Propeller	1864	710n		Hamilton & Smith	Hudson River	Broken up, 1917
Chauncey Vibbard	Steamboat	1864	1158	Fletcher	A. Van Santvoord	Hudson River	Record fast time NY-Albany 1864; lengthened, re-engined 1866; rebuilt 1880; broken up 1902
Clara Clarita	Steam yacht	1864	231	Novelty	Leonard Jerome	New York	All-time steamboat speed record on Penobscot Bay. Abandoned 1908
Oriflamme	Steamship	1864	1204	Morgan	U.S. Navy	Civil War	Built for Civil War service but sold on completion. Scrapped on or after 1878.
General J. K. Barnes	Steamship	1864	1365	Morgan	Atlantic Coast Mail SSC	NY–New Orleans	Sunk by hurricane off Cape Hatteras, 1878
Herman Livingston	Steamship	1864	1314	Morgan	Atlantic Coast Mail SSC	NY–New Orleans	Scrapped after 1878
Albemarle	Steamship	1865	871	Morgan	Atlantic Coast Mail SSC	NY–New Orleans	Barge 1882; schooner 1883; sunk in squall 1885
Hatteras	Steamship	1865	868	Morgan	Atlantic Coast Mail SSC	NY–New Orleans	Schooner barge, 1882
Raleigh	Steamship	1865	868	Morgan	Atlantic Coast Mail SSC	NY–New Orleans	Caught fire and sank off Charleston, S.C. 1867, 24 killed
Rapidan	Steamship	1865	868	Morgan	Atlantic Coast Mail SSC	NY–New Orleans	Disappeared en route to West Indies, 1886
Sleepy Hollow	Steamboat	1865		Secor	Lower Hudson SBC		
Manhattan	Steamship	1865	1337	Morgan	Amer. & Mexican Mail SSC		Schooner barge, 1877; sunk 1882
Vera Cruz	Steamship	1865	1340	Morgan	Amer. & Mexican Mail SSC		Struck and sank near Oregon Inlet, N.C. 1866
	Steamboat	1865	360			NY–Stamford, CT	
Maspeth	Ferry	1866				New York	"to be placed on the Grand and Houston street ferry"
Oregonian	Steamship	1866	2200	Allaire	Oregon SNC	West coast	Scrapped on or after 1886
Isaac Bell	Steamship	1868	1500	Allaire	Old Dominion SSC		
Sylvan Glen	Ferry	1869	350	Fletcher	Harlem SBC	New York	Scrapped 1915
	Screw yacht	1869	100		"Mr. Cheeseborough"		
Americus; Myndert Starin; Newark	Steamboat	1870	600	Burdon	Norwalk Line	NY-Greenwich, CT	
James G. Bennett	Pilot boat	1870				New York	(Note: The full name of this vessel was actually James Gordon Bennett, No. 6, but has been abbreviated in the table for reasons of space.)
	Steamboat	1871		Burdon	New Bedford & Nantucket SBC	NY–Nantucket	
	Tugboat	1871		Reaney			"to replace the Phenix"
Farragut	Ferry	1871			Fulton FC	New York Harbor	Iron hull by Continental Iron Works
Fulton	Ferry	1871			Fulton FC	New York Harbor	Iron hull by Continental Iron Works
Harlem	Steamboat	1871		Fletcher	Morrisania SBC		
Morrisania	Ferry	1871		Burdon		New York	
Sylvan Dell	Steamboat	1872	440	Fletcher	Harlem & New York NC	New York	Struck and sank, 1919
Midland	Ferry	1872			New Jersey Midland R.		
Day Star	Steamboat	1873		Burdon	American SBC	Long Island Sound	
Amos C. Barstow	Steamboat	1873				NY-Providence	
Fidelity	Screw launch	1873			Commissioners of Charities & Correction	New York	Sunk in collision, East River, 1879
Jane Mosely	Steamer	1873			Long Island RRC	Long Island Sound	
Jennie Stout	Schooner	1873	600	——	F. Alexander & Son	NY-Savannah	"largest three-masted schooner ever built" in New York. Sank in storm off Cape Hatteras 1875, 8 killed
Jessamine	Steamer	1873			Revenue Service		
Governor Andrew	Steamer	1874	503	Fletcher	Boston & Hingham SBC	Boston–Hingham	
	Steamboat	1875			City of Boston	Boston Harbor	"to convey prisoners to Deer Island"
	Steamboat	1875			St. John's Guild	New York	Floating Hospital
Crystal Wave	Steamboat	1875	700	Hubbard	American SBC	Long Island Sound	
Fanwood	Ferry	1876	1300	Fletcher	New Jersey Central RR		"Monster ferry"
San Rafael	Steamer	1877	692	Fletcher		San Francisco	Shipped overland in sections to S.F. Collision off Alcatraz Island, 1901
Saucelito	Steamer	1877	692	Fletcher		San Francisco	Shipped overland in sections to S.F. Destroyed by fire, 1884
	Riverboat	1879				NY–Yonkers	
Northampton	Steamship	1880	483		Old Dominion SSC		Caught fire and beached at Norfolk, VA 1898
	Steam launch	1881		Sullivan	Old Dominion SSC		
Albertina	Steamboat	1882		Fletcher	Red Bank Line		
Kecoughtan; Luray	Steamboat	1882		Fletcher	Old Dominion SSC	Norfolk–Newport News	(Note: The New York Times refers to the ship as Keroughtan (with an "r"), almost certainly a misspelling of Kecoughtan which was an early name for Newport News, Virginia, the steamer's destination. Additionally, Kecoughtan's engine dimensions as reported in the Times match those of only one steamboat in the records of the manufacturer, W. & A. Fletcher Co., that of Luray, built in about 1882 for the Old Dominion SSC. Evidently, Kecoughtan was renamed Luray by the company either prior to or shortly after the vessel entered service.)
F. P. James; Bronx ^{02}	Ferry	1884	445				Broken up 1917
Jacob H. Tremper	Steamboat	1885	571			Albany–Newburgh	Broken up 1929
Haarlaem; Harlem ^{22}	Ferry	1889	382		New York & East River FC	New York?	Abandoned 1927
Clermont	Steam yacht	1892			A. Van Santvoord		

== Bibliography ==
Books

- Adams, Arthur G. (1996): The Hudson Through the Years, Fordham University Press, p. 143, ISBN 978-0-8232-1677-2.
- Dayton, Fred Erving (1925): Steamboat Days, Frederick A. Stokes Company, New York.
- Elleman, Bruce A. (2001): Modern Chinese Warfare, 1795-1989, p. 47, Routledge, ISBN 978-0-415-21474-2.
- Fairburn, William Armstrong; Ritchie, Ethel M. (1954–55): Merchant Sail, Volume 5, Center Lovell, Maine : Fairburn Marine Educational Foundation.
- Frazer, John F. (1863): Journal of the Franklin Institute, Third Series, Volume XLV, January–June 1863, Franklin Institute, Philadelphia.
- Griffiths, Oliver W., ed. (Oct 1856 – Mar 1857). The U.S. Nautical Magazine and Naval Journal. New York: Oliver W. Griffiths. p. 384.
- Griffiths & Bates (1855): The Monthly Nautical Magazine and Quarterly Review, Volume 2, April–September 1855, pp. 221–226, Griffiths & Bates, New York.
- Heinrich, Thomas R. (1997): Ships for the Seven Seas: Philadelphia Shipbuilding in the Age of Industrial Capitalism, The Johns Hopkins University Press, ISBN 0-8018-5387-7.
- Heyl, Erik (1953): Early American Steamers, Volume 1, Erik Heyl, Buffalo, New York.
- Heyl, Erik (1965): Early American Steamers, Volume 4, Erik Heyl, Buffalo, New York.
- Johnson, Emory R.; Huebner, Grover G. (1920): Principles of Ocean Transportation, p. 23, D. Appleton & Co., New York and London.
- Matteson, George (2005): Tugboats of New York: An Illustrated History, pp. 54–55, NYU Press, ISBN 978-0-8147-5708-6.
- Morrison, John Harrison (1903): History of American Steam Navigation, W. F. Sametz & Co., New York.
- Morrison, John Harrison (1909): History of New York Shipyards, W. F. Sametz & Co., New York.
- Peabody Essex Museum (1956): The American Neptune, Volume 16, Peabody Essex Museum.
- Ridgely-Nevitt, Cedric (1981): American Steamships on the Atlantic, pp. 348–349, University of Delaware Press, Newark.
- Swede, George (2010): The Steam Tug, pp. 110, 160, Xlibris Books, United States, ISBN 978-1-4535-7237-5.

Periodicals

- Silka, Henry: "Shipbuilding and the Nascent Community of Greenpoint, New York, 1850-1855", Northern Mariner, Volume 16.
- The Brooklyn Daily Eagle
- The New York Times
