= PS Commonwealth =

American passenger steamboat (1854–1865)

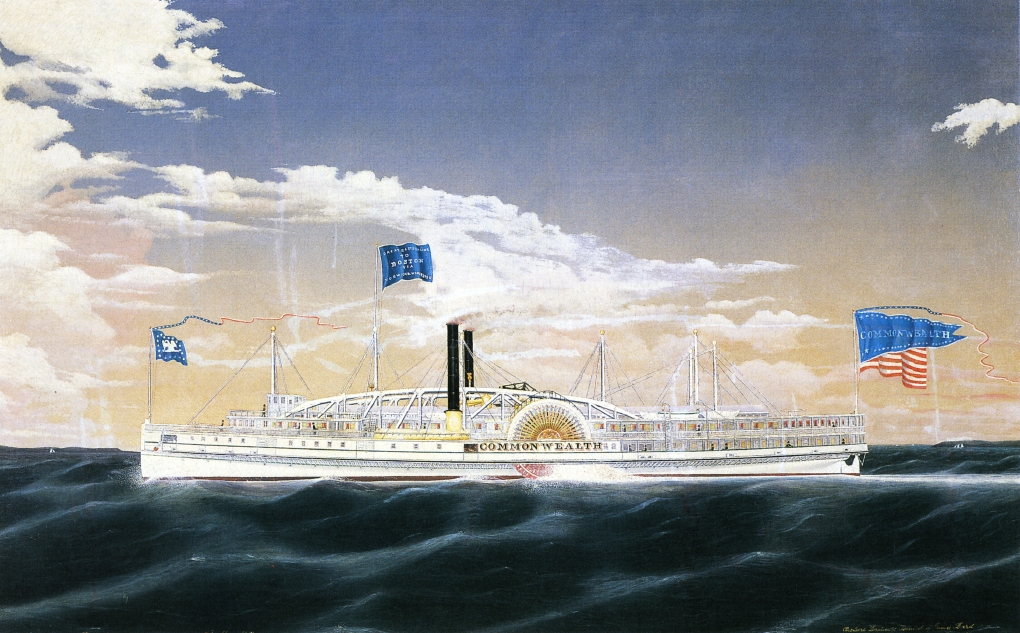
- Contemporary painting of Commonwealth by the amateur artist James Bard, c. 1860

History
- Name: Commonwealth
- Owner: 1854–60: Norwich & New London SBC; 1860–63: New Jersey Steam Navigation & Transportation Co.; 1863–65: Merchants Steamship Co.
- Builder: Lawrence & Foulks (NY)
- Cost: $250,000
- Launched: 27 Jun 1854
- Completed: March 1855
- Maiden voyage: 5 Apr 1855
- In service: 5 Apr 1855–29 Dec 1865
- Fate: Destroyed by dock fire at Groton, Conn., 29 Dec 1865

General characteristics
- Type: Passenger sidewheel steamboat
- Tonnage: 1,732
- Length: 330 ft (100 m)
- Beam: 42 ft (13 m), 77 ft (23 m) over guards
- Draft: 8 ft (2.4 m)
- Depth of hold: 13 ft 6 in (4.11 m)
- Propulsion: 1 × 76 inch bore, 12-foot stroke vertical beam steam engine
- Sail plan: None
- Capacity: 1000+ passengers, with sleeping quarters for 600

Commonwealth was a large sidewheel steamboat built in 1854–55 for passenger service on Long Island Sound. The most celebrated Sound steamer of her day, Commonwealth was especially noted for the elegance and comfort of her passenger accommodations, which included gas lighting, steam heating, and an "enchantingly beautiful" domed roof in her upper saloon. Her stability of motion led her captain to describe Commonwealth as the finest rough weather steamboat ever built in the United States.

Commonwealth would spend her entire career on Long Island Sound routes, first from New York to Allyn's Point, Connecticut under the management of the Norwich and New London Steamboat Company, and later to Stonington and Groton with the New Jersey Steam Navigation and the Merchants' Steamship companies. During the American Civil War, she was part of the transport network that moved northern state Union regiments to the battlefront. Commonwealth's end came prematurely when she was destroyed by a dockyard fire at Groton in December 1865.

== Construction and design ==
Commonwealth was built by Lawrence & Foulks at Williamsburg, New York for the Norwich and New London Steamboat Company, which ran a steamboat line between New York City and Connecticut. About 18 months in construction, she was completed in March 1855.

=== Dimensions and hull design ===
Commonwealth had an overall length of 330 feet (100 metres), with a length on deck of 316 feet and 300 feet along the load line, making her one of the largest steamboats on the sound. She had a beam of 42 feet—77 feet over the guards—a hold depth of 13 feet 6 inches and a gross register tonnage of 1,732 tons. For a vessel of her size and tonnage, she drew a surprisingly light draft of scarcely more than 8 feet in running trim.

Commonwealth's hull design was considered to be exceptional—"worthy of examination by all professional architects." The hull was flat-bottomed with an external keel, and the bow sharply angled. The midship section was duplicated for 56 feet fore and aft—an original feature in steamboat design—and the broad beam was considered an aid to stability. Like all large American wooden-hulled steamboats of the era, the hull was supported by heavy hog frames and iron tie-rods suspended from king posts to prevent excessive hogging, but in Commonwealth's case it was also strengthened with diagonal iron braces "after the manner of fastening the first-class sea-going steamships", and constructed throughout "with great reference to strength and safety."

Overall, the hull was deemed to provide "adequate stability, ease of motion, and every other good sea quality." This assessment would be borne out in practice: Commonwealth's longstanding captain, Jerome W. Williams, would later describe the vessel as "the finest boat for rough water ever built" in the United States.

=== Machinery ===
Commonwealth was powered by a 1,200 horsepower, 19 rpm single cylinder vertical beam steam engine, with 76-inch bore, 12-foot stroke and Stevens cut-off set at 7 feet, built by the Morgan Iron Works of New York. The engine was fitted with a safety device, designed by Erastus W. Smith, which uncoupled the eccentric in the event of the piston moving further than its prescribed limit, to prevent further damage in the event of a component failure.

Steam, at an average pressure of 30 psi (max. 40) was supplied by a pair of 38-foot by 13-foot-6-inch cylindrical iron return-flue boilers, placed on the guards forward of the paddlewheels. The boiler furnaces, six in total, were fitted with blower engines and used anthracite coal for fuel, about 30 tons of which could be stored in the ship's coal bunkers. The paddlewheels were 38 feet in diameter and each fitted with 28 10-foot 6-inch paddles, with a dip of 32 inches—40 inches when the vessel was fully loaded. While Commonwealth's speed is not recorded, it is said to have been unexceptional.

=== Passenger accommodations ===
Commonwealth was noted for the excellence of her passenger accommodations, designed by architect Alexander Hawkins. One feature in particular—the domed upper roof—drew praise, including that of a correspondent for The New York Times:

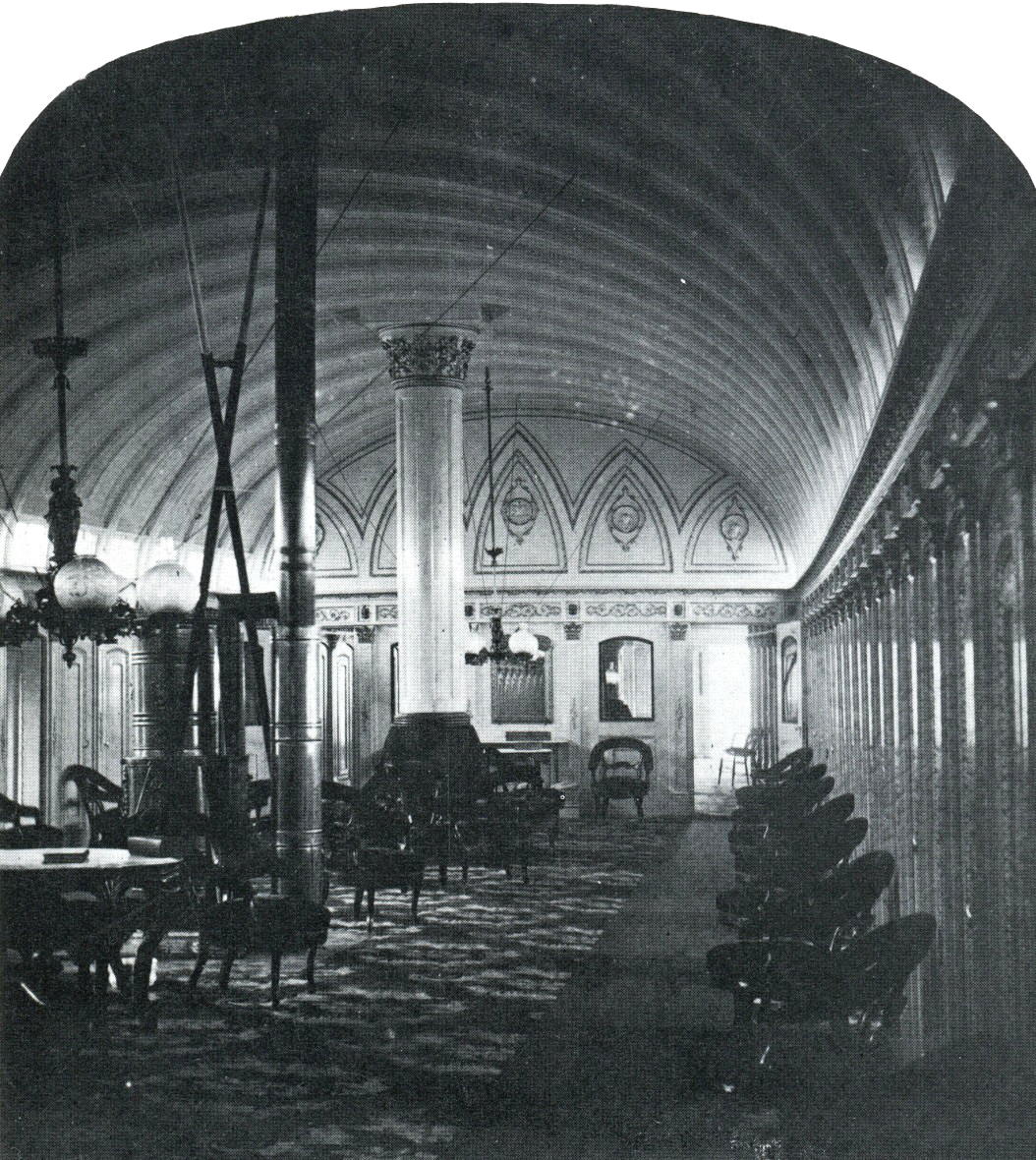
Detail of Commonwealth's upper saloon, showing the domed roof. This stereoscope, taken c. 1860 by George Stacy, is one of the earliest photos of the interior of an American steamboat.

One of the most noticeable and praiseworthy [features] ... is a semicircular roof to the upper saloon, which gives an air of spaciousness, elegance and comfort that is as novel as it is cheering. This arched roof extends nearly the entire length of the boat, and the prospect through the long corridor is enchantingly beautiful; the arched roof sits so gracefully on its supports, and its ribs are so light, that it seems self-sustained, like the blue arch above our heads. It is painted with exquisite taste a pure white, for any attempt at ornamentation would mar its graceful and beautiful proportions; and gilding and gingerbread work are used with a sparing and chastened hand in all parts of this splendid vessel.

The saloon deck also featured an after cabin fitted with thirty large sofas, allowing passengers to "sit and enjoy the magnificent prospect of the evening passage on the Sound with comfort."

Below the saloon deck, in the upper hull, was the main passenger deck, with 120 staterooms, fitted with two beds each, and a number of bridal suites. The staterooms were large, well-ventilated, and designed with "Oriental elegance", incorporating materials such as satin damask, moquette, lace, velvet tapestry, and rosewood furniture. Also on this deck, abaft of the engine room, was "a spacious and splendid ladies' cabin, unsurpassed in style and finish."

Below the main passenger deck was a third deck, containing more cabin space aft and a dining saloon forward. The three decks were linked by staircases forward and aft, with a main staircase amidships with double flights and double entrances which ran from the lower cabin to the upper saloon, described as a particularly fine piece of workmanship.

A number of firms were subcontracted for the specialty work: McGrath & Allendorph and M. H. C. Glensman for the cabinet work; Reed, Tice & Hamilton for the joinery; A. T. Stuart & Co. for the upholstery; Haughwout & Co. for the chandeliers; and Storrs Brothers for the plated ware. Furniture for the vessel, constructed of rosewood, was designed specifically for the ship. The tableware was of white China and heavy plated silverware. The servants designed their own livery: black pants, white vests and jackets, and blue velvet caps with silver trimming and the letters "C. W." in beadwork at the front.

=== Safety features and communications ===
In addition to passenger comfort, the designers of Commonwealth also paid considerable attention to safety. Commonwealth was furnished with eight lifeboats, 600 life-preservers—enough for every passenger aboard—and 155 life-preserving seats. A large number of water pumps, operable either by machine or hand, were installed, each fitted with "a great length of hose" ready for use; also a number of "steam fire annihilators". Even the staterooms themselves were arranged in such a way as to permit rapid access to the main deck in case of emergency.

To communicate with passengers and crew, a speaking trumpet was fitted to the rooms of the captain and pilot, just aft of the wheelhouse. The trumpet could also be utilized as a whistle to the forecastle. Additionally, the captain was able to communicate with crew members via a set of twelve bells located in different parts of the ship.

=== Officers ===
Having spent a considerable sum on the boat, the proprietors of Commonwealth were careful to ensure that their investment was placed in competent hands. Their choice of skipper for the vessel was Captain Jerome W. Williams, a seaman with almost 25 years of navigational experience on Long Island Sound, and known for his "cool, clear head and good judgement". Williams would remain Commonwealth's captain for the whole of her career, through all her changes of ownership, and is said to have developed a great fondness for the vessel. Commonwealth's chief engineer was Samuel Carter, another man with at least 20 years' experience. Both officers were said to enjoy "the very highest reputation" in their respective fields.

== Service history ==
=== 1855–1860 ===
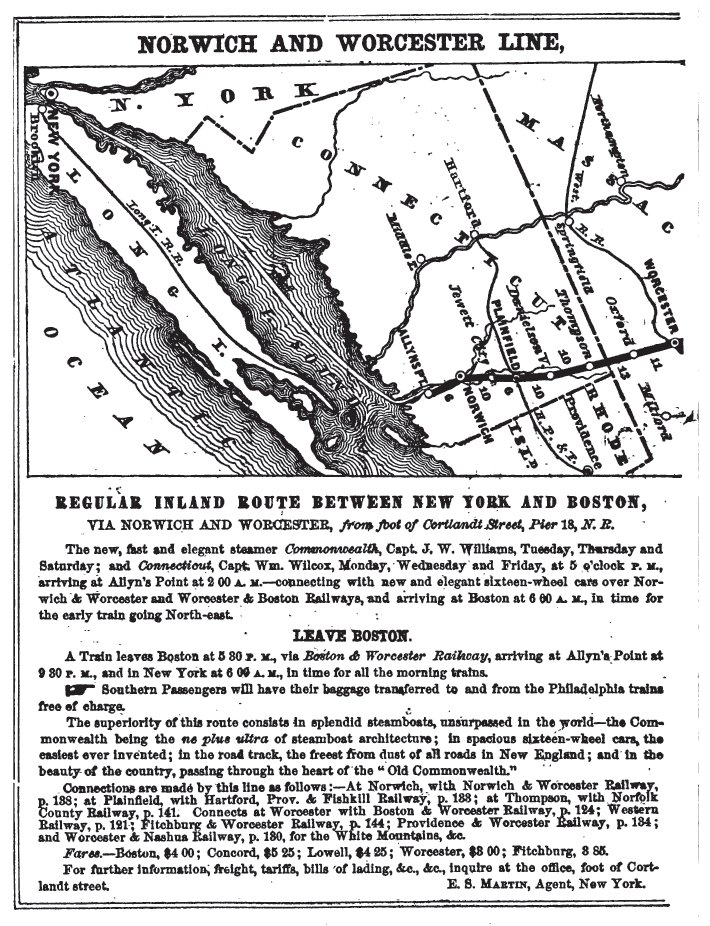
An 1859 advertisement for the Norwich & Worcester Railroad, showing Commonwealth's route from New York to Allyn's Point, Connecticut

Commonwealth embarked on her trial trip, testing her engine for the first time, on March 20, 1855. She was then placed by her proprietors, the Norwich & New London Steamboat Company, on the route from New York to Allyn's Point, Connecticut, the latter being the terminus of the Norwich & Worcester Railroad, which ran a connecting service to Boston via Norwich, Connecticut and Worcester, Massachusetts. For Commonwealth's debut, the Railroad itself introduced a number of "splendid new sixteen wheel" railway carriages as a means of increasing the attraction of the service. The Railroad also assigned a train specifically to the steamer, ready to leave the moment Commonwealth arrived with her freight and passengers.

Commonwealth made her maiden voyage to Allyn's Point on Thursday, April 5, 1855. She would thereafter maintain a regular scheduled service on this route, departing from the foot of Cortlandt Street, New York at 4pm every Tuesday, Thursday and Saturday, alternating with her stablemate Connecticut which departed at the same time on Mondays, Wednesdays and Fridays. This schedule, excepting accidents, maintenance and poor weather, appears to have persisted until the sale of Commonwealth in 1860.

On the night of September 3, 1855, Commonwealth broke her starboard crankshaft in stormy weather, and was taken in tow by the rival steamer Metropolis of the Fall River Line, the two vessels arriving in port about 8:00am, or about two hours behind schedule for Metropolis. A new crankshaft was manufactured and fitted to Commonwealth in the "remarkably short time" of ten days, and she resumed service on or about the 18th.

In October and November 1855, the essayist Henry David Thoreau made a couple of voyages aboard Commonwealth to New York City. Of the second, Thoreau remarked that while the weather was "so windy inland", the vessel had "a perfectly smooth passage" and himself "about as good a sleep as usually at home." In June 1857, a woman reportedly fell overboard from Commonwealth at the New London wharf, and could not be extricated from the water for half an hour, during which time the buoyancy of her hoop dress was said to have saved her from drowning. In August 1858, Commonwealth suffered a collision with the schooner Sea Lark, but only minor damage was done to either vessel.

In early 1859, the Norwich & New London Steamboat Company attempted to negotiate a larger share of the proceeds with their partner, the Norwich & Worcester Railroad. With the failure of these negotiations, the Steamboat Company announced its intention to replace Commonwealth with an inferior vessel on the expiration of their existing contract. Commonwealth consequently made her last run from Allyn's Point on Monday, January 2, 1860. A few days later, she was sold to the New Jersey Steamboat Company (Stonington Line), which placed the vessel on the New York to Stonington, Connecticut, route.

Commonwealth's most serious accident in terms of human cost occurred on the morning of December 19, 1860, about 5am. While waiting for daylight, to pass safely through Hell Gate, a defective plate in Commonwealth's steam chimney burst, allowing steam into the starboard fireroom. When the firemen opened the door to make their escape, a gust of wind diverted the steam into a group of passengers on deck. A family of four from Dublin, the Blakes, were all scalded, the mother so badly she was not expected to recover. A young colored waiter who ran out on deck at the same moment was fatally scalded by inhalation. Two other passengers were also scalded. At an inquest held two days later, the cause of the explosion was determined to be corrosion of the steam chimney, and an accidental finding returned.

=== Civil war era, 1861–1865 ===
With the outbreak of the American Civil War in April 1861, the U.S. government requisitioned hundreds of steamboats and steamships to serve as transports, gunboats and blockade ships. Commonwealth would escape this fate, continuing through the war to operate on her usual Long Island Sound routes. In this role she would still however contribute to the war effort, as part of the transport network that brought newly recruited regiments and their supplies from the northeastern United States to the battlefront.

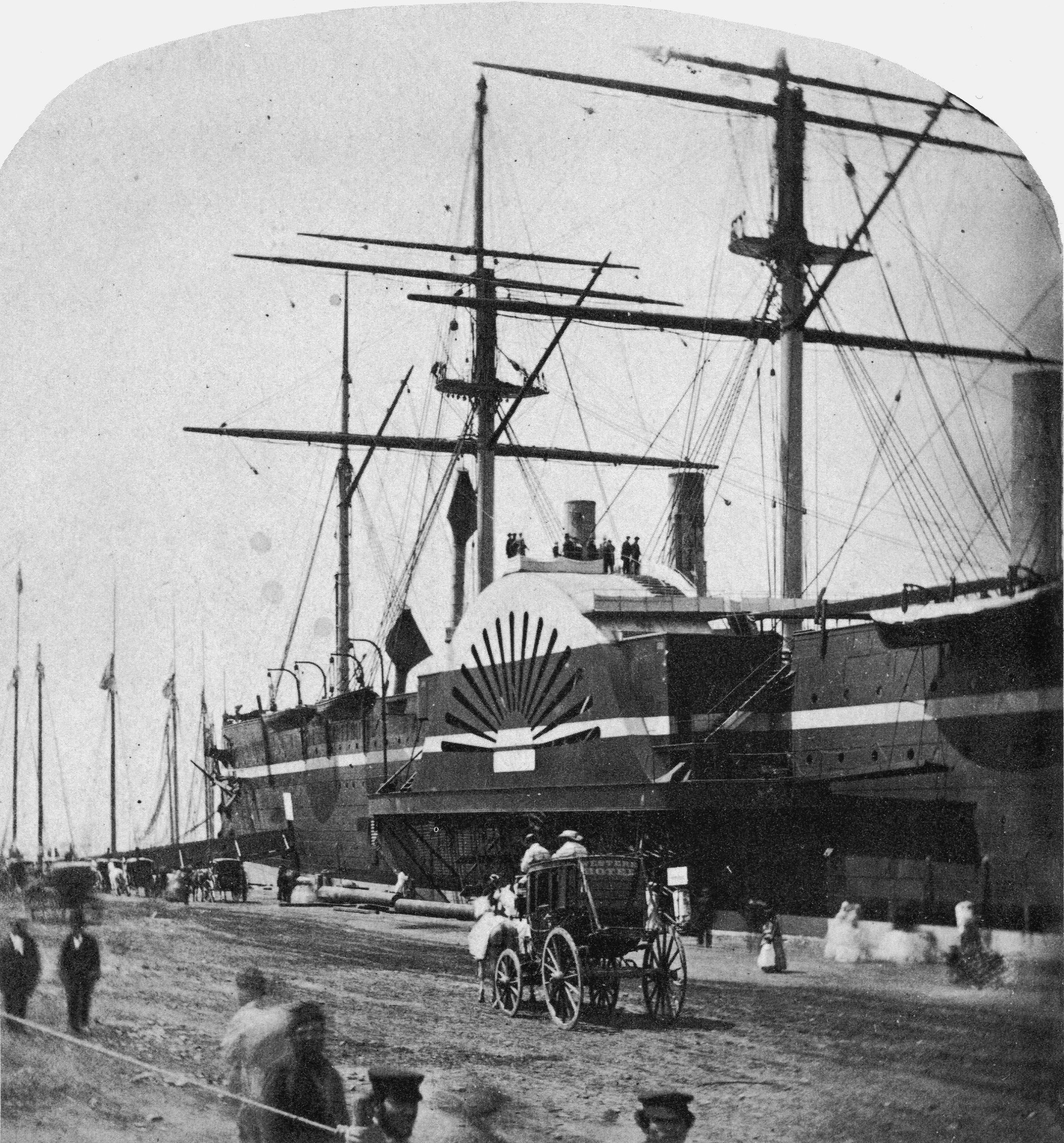
SS Great Eastern in New York Harbor, 1860. Union troops aboard Commonwealth in late 1862 had excellent views of the mammoth steamship.

As early as May 1861, Commonwealth was engaged in transporting troops from Connecticut to New Jersey, when elements of the 40th "Mozart" Regiment, New York Volunteers, embarked at Stonington on the 31st. Numerous full regiments followed, including the 1st Massachusetts Infantry (June 1861); the 7th Massachusetts Infantry(July); the 16th Maine and 19th Maine Volunteers (August 1862); and the 27th Maine and 11th Rhode Island Volunteers. Commonwealth was capable of accommodating an entire 1,000-man regiment plus additional passengers on a single voyage, but conditions in such circumstances were not always ideal—the 11th Rhode Island, for example, complained of a shortage of suitable sleeping arrangements. Regiments transported on Commonwealth in late 1862 were treated to "fine view[s]" of the mammoth British steamship Great Eastern, then laid up in New York Harbor for extended repairs.

When transporting troops, Commonwealth's usual route from Stonington to New York City was slightly altered, with the point of embarkation sometimes moved to Groton, Connecticut and the destination to Jersey City. After disembarking at Jersey, regiments then typically travelled on by train to Philadelphia. Here they were invariably given an enthusiastic reception by the local populace, which included a "splendid repast" at the Cooper Shop Refreshment Saloon, a venue maintained for the troops throughout the war by local volunteers. While the meal was greatly appreciated, some soldiers are said to have left the city with fonder memories still of the passionate embraces of the local females, who lined the streets to bid them farewell on their departure. After the war, some regiments would also return to their homes on Commonwealth.

In late 1863, Commonwealth suffered a series of collisions with other vessels, all of them relatively minor. On October 20, the British propeller Salidan, setting out for Jamaica, struck Commonwealth as the latter was exiting her Cortlandt Street berth. Commonwealth's starboard paddle guard was torn off, and some damage done to the paddle frame—about $1,000 damage in all, which was expected to take four or five days to repair. On November 28, in dense fog, Commonwealth collided with two Williamsburg ferries in succession—Warren and Nebraska. Again, the vessels involved appear to have escaped serious damage.

In December 1863, Commonwealth's proprietors, the Stonington Line, merged with the Neptune Line to form a new entity, the Merchants' Steamship Company. Commonwealth and the other Stonington Line boats were subsequently sold by private auction to the newly formed company. Since the Stonington Line's partner, the Boston and Providence Railroad, had by this time extended its service to Groton, Connecticut and built a large new terminus there, Commonwealth's regular destination was around the same time relocated from Stonington to Groton.

=== Loss ===
Following her acquisition by the Merchants Steamship Company in December 1863, Commonwealth appears to have continued working the New York to Groton route almost without incident for the next two years, the one exception being another minor scrape with a New York ferry on November 22, 1864.

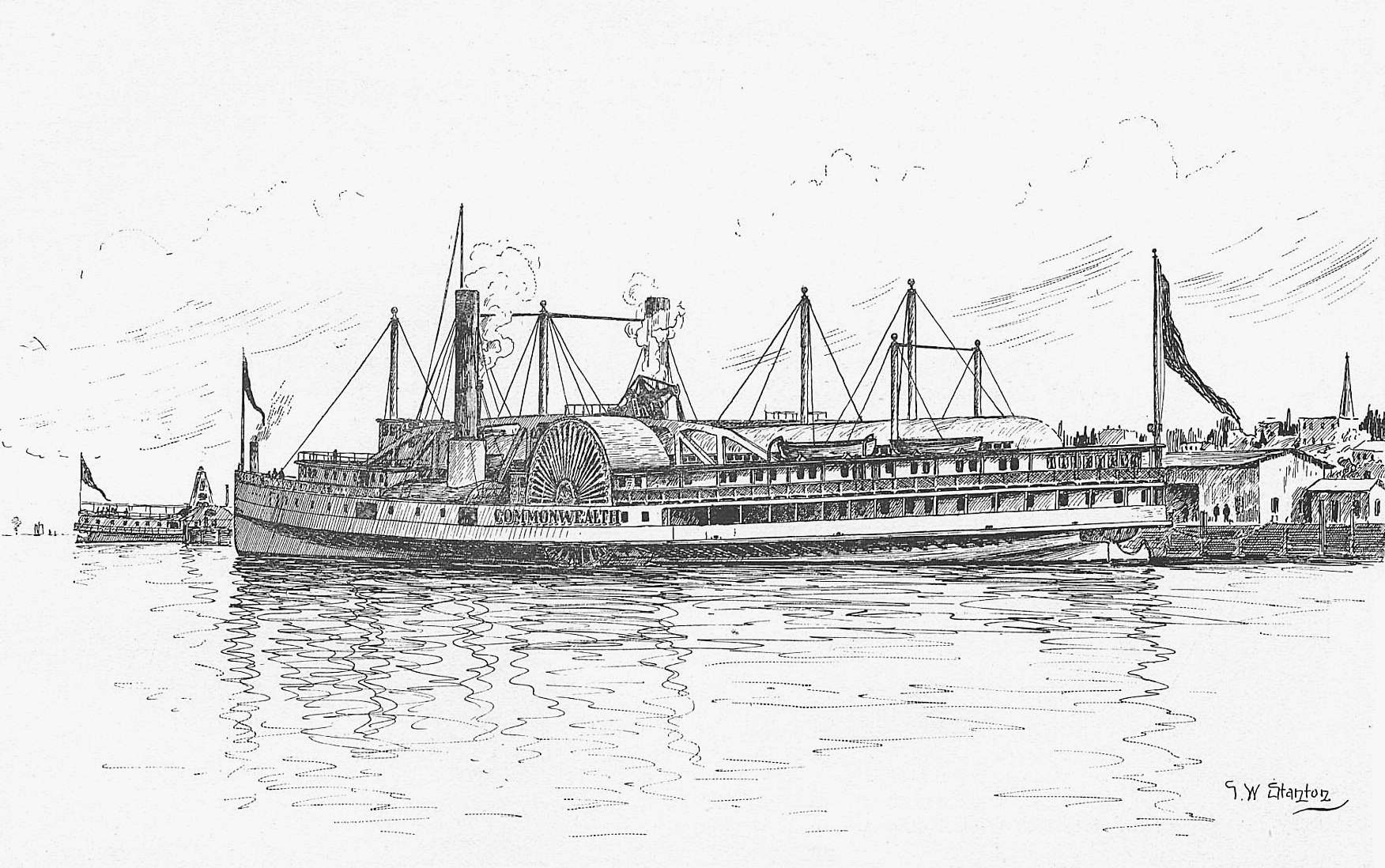
Stern view of Commonwealth; illustration by Stanton

Commonwealth departed New York on her usual run on December 28, 1865. Shortly after arriving at Groton, at about 1:30am on the morning of the 29th, a fire broke out at the Groton depot which could not be contained. An attempt to tow Commonwealth to safety was made by a local ferry, but an unusually low tide, combined with the weight of Commonwealth's freight which was still aboard, had grounded the vessel on a sandbar, and Commonwealth caught fire at the bows and was burned to the water's edge. Fortunately, most of Commonwealth's passengers had already disembarked and departed by train, but a young medical student named J. Dickson Ripley, a nephew of Connecticut Governor William A. Buckingham, could not be aroused despite repeated poundings on his cabin door and was presumed to have suffocated from smoke inhalation in his sleep.

In addition to the loss of Commonwealth, the entire depot at Groton was destroyed, so thoroughly that the Railroad was forced to move its terminus back to its former location of Stonington for a time. Total damage from the fire was estimated at $1,500,000. Because of Commonwealth's well maintained firefighting facilities, her proprietors had only insured the vessel for $80,000, with replacement value estimated at $600,000.

Salvage of Commonwealth continued well into 1866, with the steamer's safe, containing about $500 and "many valuable papers", recovered in July. According to Fred Dayton, author of the 1925 history Steamboat Days, Commonwealth was subsequently raised, "rebuilt from the burned wreck", and returned to service on her former route, before being "wrecked in a storm off Orient Point", but this account is uncorroborated.

== Models ==
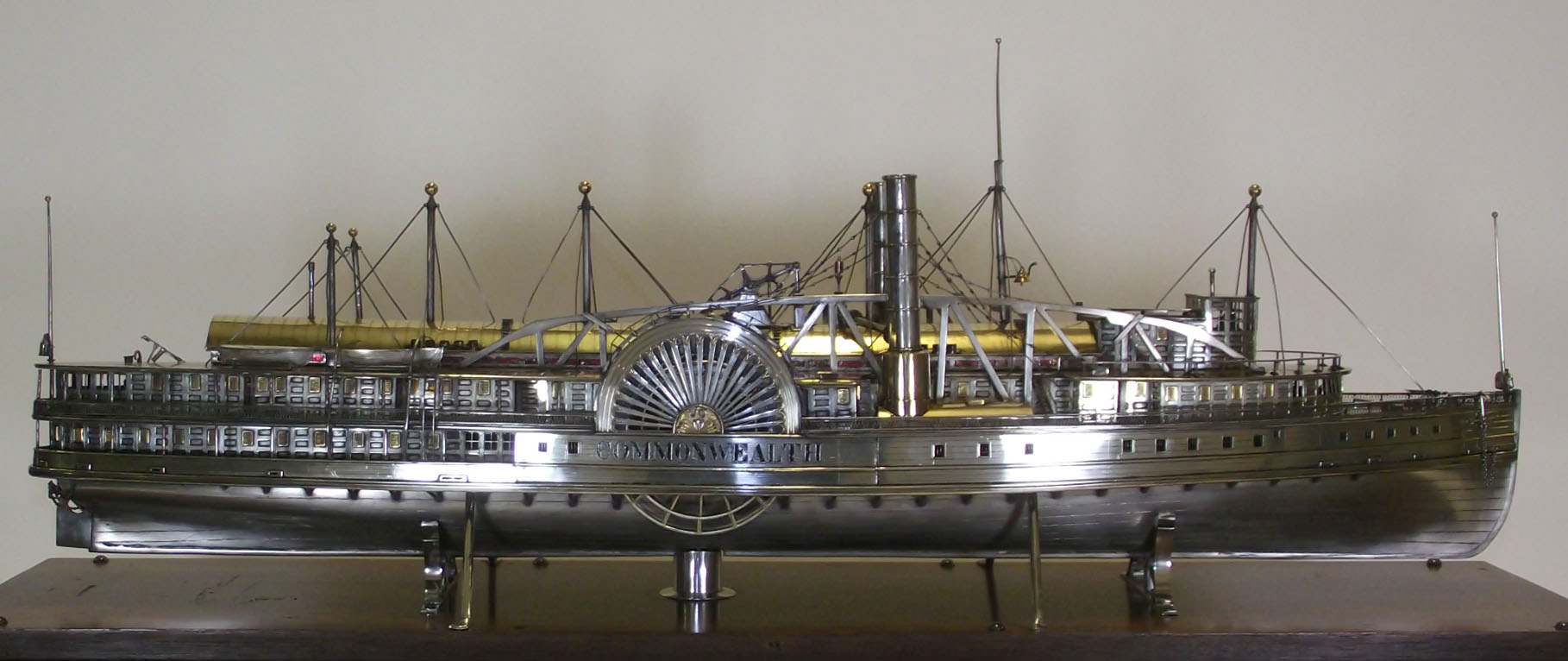
Model of the steamboat Commonwealth by John Dean Benton, ca 1864, The Mariners' Museum

A number of notable models of Commonwealth were made in her time. William Foulks, partner in the shipbuilding firm that constructed Commonwealth, won the gold medal in the naval architecture division of the American Institute of New York's 27th Annual Fair in 1855 for a model of the vessel. The American jewelry firm Tiffany & Co. won the bronze medal for silverware at the Paris Exposition of 1867 for a display which included an "exquisite" silver model music box of Commonwealth. This model was made by John Dean Benton, a Tiffany silversmith, and it played ten airs of the day including ‘Nellie Bligh’ and ‘By Banks and Braes of Bonnie Doon.’ An 1864 edition of Scientific American describes the model in detail:

In its construction seventy-three ounces of gold were used, and two hundred and fifty-two ounces of silver, and skilled mechanics have been employed upon the work for six months, at an aggregate cost of six thousand five hundred dollars. The length of this model is thirty-one inches, and it is an exact copy of the steamer Commonwealth, made by measurement upon a diminished scale of three thirty-seconds of an inch to the foot. The workmanship is most elaborate. Not only the smoke-stacks, flag-staffs and deck machinery are carefully copied, but the panels of the saloons, the window shades, and all the intricate and delicate handiwork which appears on the steamer, are accurately represented. This piece of workmanship is supplied with machinery and music, and will undoubtedly be one of the features of the Philadelphia Fair.

This model was presented to the captain of Commonwealth, Jerome Wheeler Williams, by the Norwich and New London Steamboat Company for their appreciation of his service. The model is now in the collection at The Mariners’ Museum where it is considered to be one of the gems of the collection.

== Bibliography ==
Books

- Annual Report of the Adjutant-General of the Commonwealth of Massachusetts, For the Year Ending December 31, 1865, p. 544, Wright & Potter (1866), Boston
- Appleton's Railway and Steam Navigation Guide, (1859), p. 246, D. Appleton & Co., New York
- Baker, W. A. and Tryckare, Tre (Eds.) (1965): The Engine Powered Vessel, p. 48, The Ysel Press, Deventer, distributed by Grosset & Dunlap, Inc., New York
- Caulkins, Frances Manwaring (1866): History of Norwich, Connecticut: From Its Possession By The Indians, To The Year 1866, p. 638, Frances Manwaring Caulkins
- Dayton, Fred Erving (1925): Steamboat Days, Frederick A. Stokes Company, New York
- Emerson's Magazine and Putnam's Monthly, Volume V, July to December 1857, p. 108, J. M. Emerson & Co., New York
- Every Saturday: A Journal of Choice Reading, Volume III, Jan-Jun 1867, p. 639, Ticknor and Fields, Boston
- Floyd, Frederick Clark (1909): History of the Fortieth (Mozart) Regiment, New York Volunteers, p. 22, F. H. Gilson Company, Boston
- Frazer, John F. (Ed.) (1855): Journal of the Franklin Institute of the State of Pennsylvania for the Promotion of the Mechanical Arts, p. 275, Franklin Institute, Pennsylvania
- Headley, P. C. (1866): Massachusetts in the Rebellion, p. 146, Walker, Fuller & Company, Boston
- Heyl, Erik (1964): Early American Steamers, pp. 97–98, Erik Heyl, Buffalo
- Johnson, Harry and Lightfoot, Frederick S. (1980): Maritime New York in Nineteenth-Century Photographs, p. 23, Dover Publications, Inc., New York, ISBN 978-0-486-23963-7
- Jones, A. D. (1855): The Illustrated American Biography, Volume III, p. 282, J. Milton Emerson & Co., New York
- The Monthly Nautical Magazine and Quarterly Review, Volume II, April to September 1855, pp. 221-226, Griffiths & Bates, New York
- Morford, Henry (1867): Paris in '67; Or, The Great Exposition, Its Side-Shows and Excursions, p. 233a, Geo. W. Carleton & Co., New York; S. Low, Son & Co., London
- Morrison, John H. (1903): History of American Steam Navigation, W. F. Sametz & Co., New York
- Nash, J. A.; Parish, M. P. (Eds.) (1857): The Plough, The Loom And The Anvil, Volume X, p. 256, J. A. Nash & M. P. Parish, New York
- Parrish, M. P. (Ed.) (1856): The Plough, The Loom And The Anvil, Volume VIII, pp. 774, 809, 839, M. P. Parish, New York
- Pullen, John J. (1997): A Shower of Stars: The Medal of Honor and the 27th Maine, pp. 38-39, Stackpole Books, Pennsylvania, ISBN 978-0-8117-0075-7
- Robbins, Rufus; Bruen, Ella Jane and Fitzgibbons, Brian M. (Eds.) (2005): Through Ordinary Eyes: The Civil War Correspondence of Rufus Robbins, Private, 7th Regiment, Massachusetts Volunteers, pp. 17-18, Bison Books, ISBN 978-0-8032-9006-8
- Rock, R. W. (1881): History of the Eleventh Regiment, Rhode Island Volunteers, in the War of the Rebellion, pp. 15-18, Providence Press Company, Providence
- Sanborn, F. B. (1894): Familiar Letters Of Henry David Thoreau, p. 335, Houghton, Mifflin and Company, Boston and New York
- Small, A. R. (2009): The Sixteenth Maine Regiment in the War of the Rebellion, 1861-1865, p. 23, Bibliolife, ISBN 978-1-113-60280-0
- Smith, John Day (1909): The History of the Nineteenth Regiment of Maine Volunteer Infantry, pp. 6-7, The Great Western Printing Company, Minneapolis
- Starr, W. H. (1858): The Repository, Volume I, p. 199, W. H. Starr & Co., New London, Connecticut
- Thoreau, Henry David; Torrey, Bradford and Allen, F. H. (Eds.) (1962): The Journal of Henry D. Thoreau, Vol. 2, p. 133, Dover Publications, ISBN 978-0-486-20313-3
- Transactions of the American Institute of the City of New York, For the Year 1855, p. 178, C. Van Benthuysen, Albany

Periodicals

- The New York Times
- Scientific American
