= USS Flambeau (1861) =

Gunboat of the United States Navy

History

United States
- Name: USS Flambeau
- Builder: Lawrence & Foulks (NY)
- Laid down: date unknown
- Launched: 1861
- Acquired: 14 November 1861
- Commissioned: 27 November 1861
- Decommissioned: 7 June 1865
- Stricken: 1865 (est.)
- Fate: Sold, 12 July 1865

General characteristics
- Displacement: 850 tons
- Length: 180 ft (55 m)
- Beam: 30 ft (9.1 m)
- Draught: 11 ft (3.4 m)
- Propulsion: steam engine; screw-propelled
- Speed: not known
- Complement: not known
- Armament: one 30-pounder rifle; one 20-pounder rifle

USS Flambeau was a screw steamship purchased by the Union Navy during the American Civil War. She was used by the Union Navy as a gunboat, operating in Confederate waterways.

Flambeau was built in 1861 by Lawrence & Foulks, Brooklyn, New York; purchased by the Navy 14 November 1861; and commissioned 27 November 1861, Lieutenant Commander W. G. Temple in command.

== Assigned to operate with the South Atlantic Blockade ==
Assigned to the South Atlantic Blockading Squadron, Flambeau arrived at Nassau, New Providence, 11 December 1861, and for a month patrolled this key base for blockade runners. On 22 January 1862, Flambeau arrived at Port Royal, South Carolina, from which she was ordered to blockade Stono Inlet, one of the entrances to Charleston Harbor.

== Flambeau’s foraging party captured by Confederates ==
For the next year, she cruised off Charleston, sharing in the capture of several prizes, and sending a party ashore 28 December to destroy the abandoned fort on Bull's Island. Returning to Bull's Bay on 31 January 1863, she sent a foraging party ashore, all of whom were captured. The following day, the Flambeau landed a rescue party, but it was intercepted and had one man killed and one wounded in the ensuing skirmish.

== Florida and Georgia operations ==
In February 1863, Flambeau delivered stores to ships on the coasts of Florida and Georgia, then returned to duty off Charleston until April. After repairs at Washington, D.C., she joined her squadron at New Inlet from May through September, taking schooner Betty Kratzer prize on 23 June. She then served at Fernandina, Florida, where on 28 November she took the schooner John Gilpin prize. She returned to New York City where between 10 February 1864 and 2 June she was out of commission for repairs.

== Reassigned to the Carolina coast ==
Rejoining her squadron 21 June 1864, Flambeau was ordered to Georgetown, South Carolina, where on 23 June she fired on Confederate cavalry and civilians seen working on two wrecks on the beach, dispersing them. She continued to blockade the Carolina coast, and carried supplies from the base at Port Royal, South Carolina, to the fleet of Charleston through the remainder of the war.

== End-of-war decommissioning and disposal ==
She returned to New York Navy Yard 31 May 1865, was decommissioned 7 June 1865, and sold 12 July 1865.
