= Clara Clarita =

Ship

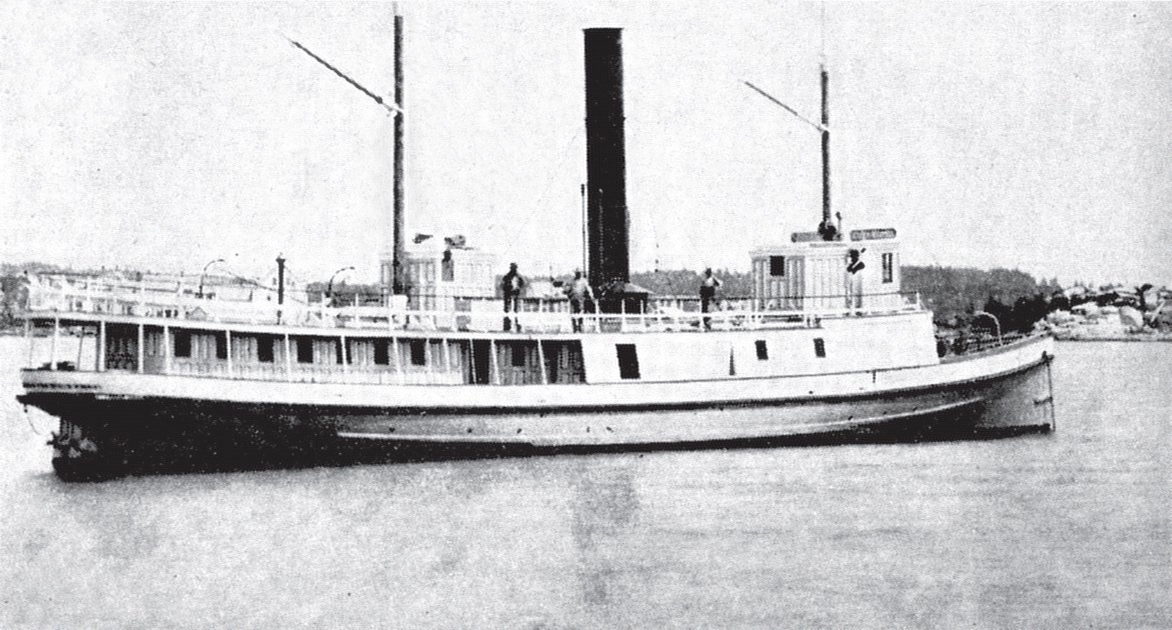
- Clara Clarita after conversion to a passenger steamer, c. 1870

History
- Namesake: Leonard Jerome's wife and/or daughter
- Owner: 1864: Leonard Jerome; 1865: Pacific Mail SSC; 1870: New York Harbor Protective Co.; 1873: Fox Island & Rockland SBC; 1880s: Knickerbocker Steam Towage Co.; 1890s: Boston Towing Company
- Builder: Lawrence & Foulks (Brooklyn, NY)
- Cost: $125,000
- Launched: 1863
- Completed: July 1864
- In service: 1864–1908
- Refit: 1865: Towboat; 1870: Fireboat; 1870s: Passenger steamer; 1880s: Oceangoing tugboat
- Identification: Official No. 4873
- Honors and awards: Fastest towboat in New York, 1860s; All-time fastest steamer on Penobscot Bay
- Fate: Abandoned, 1908

General characteristics
- Type: 1864: Steam yacht; 1865: Towboat; 1870: Fireboat; 1870s: Passenger steamer; 1880s: Tugboat
- Tonnage: 125 GRT; 62 NRT
- Length: Original 130 ft (40 m); later 115 ft (35 m)
- Beam: 22 ft 8 in (6.91 m)
- Depth of hold: 9 ft (2.7 m)
- Installed power: 1864 original: 1 × 16 in × 36 in (410 mm × 910 mm) (bore × stroke) horizontal stationary steam engine; 1864 refit: 2 × 22 in (560 mm) bore × stroke inverted direct-acting engines
- Propulsion: 1864 original: single screw; 1864 refit: single 9 ft (2.7 m) screw
- Sail plan: Originally two-masted schooner
- Crew: 10 (merchant service)
- Armament: 1864: 2 × 12-pounder (5.4 kg) Wiard steel boat-howitzers

Clara Clarita was a fast screw steamer originally built as a luxury steam yacht for New York City financier Leonard Jerome (grandfather of British Prime Minister Sir Winston Churchill). On her trial trip, Clara Clarita's original engine proved so ineffective it was removed before the vessel entered service and replaced by machinery from a different supplier. Jerome sold the yacht after only a short time and she was converted into a towboat, becoming the fastest such vessel in New York Harbor, before being converted into a fireboat in the same locality.

In the 1870s, Clara Clarita underwent a third conversion, into a passenger steamer, in which role she set an all-time speed record for a steamer on Penobscot Bay. Her final conversion was into an oceangoing tug, some time after which her crew and captain were presented with a heroism award for a rescue at sea. The vessel was abandoned in 1908 after a long and varied 44-year career.

== Construction and design ==
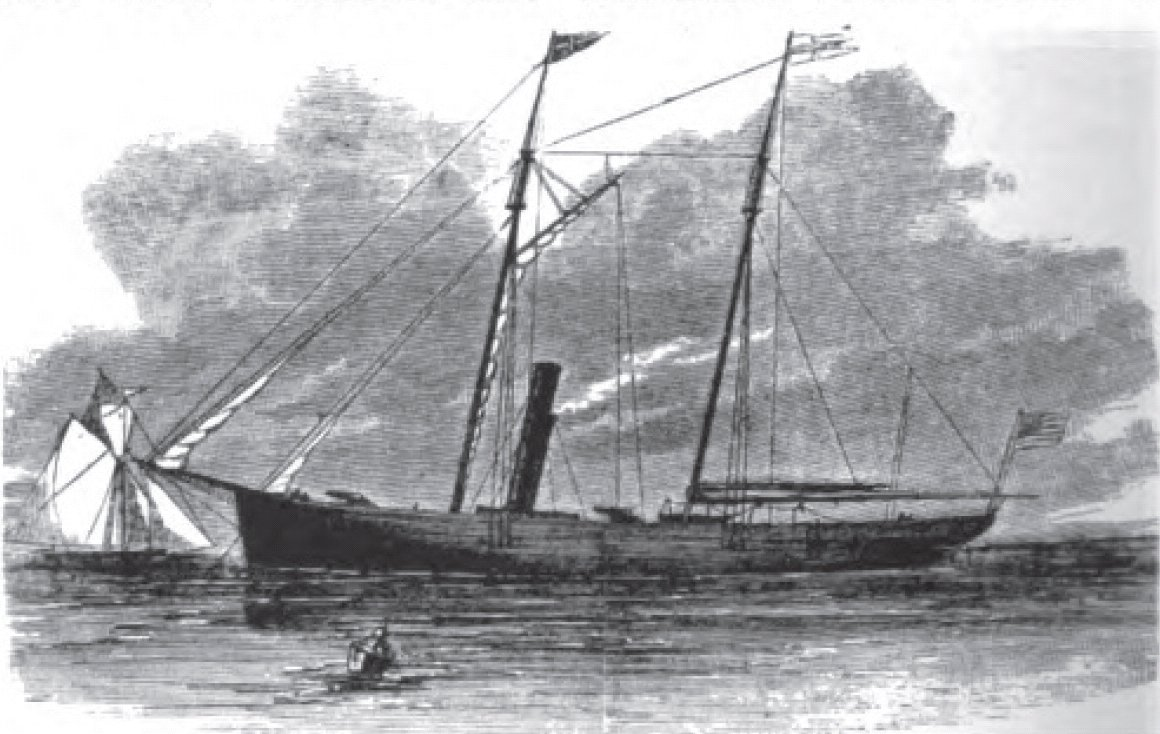
Steam yacht Clara Clarita in 1864, as originally designed

Clara Clarita was built for Leonard Jerome in 1864 at Williamsburg, New York by Lawrence & Foulks, a company with a reputation for building fast and elegant steamers. Her construction was supervised throughout by W. W. Vanderbilt, Chief Engineer of the Pacific Mail Steamship Company. The vessel was named after Leonard Jerome's wife Clara and/or his daughter Clarita, also known as Clara.

Clara Clarita's frames and outer planking were of white oak, the latter 2 1/2 in (64 mm) inches thick. The cabin hatches and combings above deck were mahogany, "plainly but beautifully finished". The vessel was 120 feet (37 m) in length along the keel, and 130 feet (40 m) on deck, with a beam of 22 feet (6.7 m) and hold depth of 10 feet (3.0 m). She had a high bow, two raking masts, schooner-rigged, and a single raked smokestack. For protection, she was armed with two steel 12-pounder (5.4 kg) Wiard boat howitzers with brass carriages. Overall, she was described as a vessel "of an exquisite model, every graceful line proclaiming her speed."

=== Interior ===
Clara Clarita's interior was designed by one of America's leading ship joiners, William Rowland, the "Lorenzo Ghiberti" of his trade. Below deck, the steamer contained sleeping berths, two cabins, one forward and one aft, a pantry and "a dainty little wash-room aft". The panelwork in the after cabin was white with "faint pink tints" and gold highlights, while the forward cabin was "handsomely furnished". The berths were fringed with green silk curtains lined with canary-yellow satin, and a black walnut beaufet held the silverware.

In her memoirs, Jerome's daughter Jennie (later Lady Randolph Churchill and the mother of Sir Winston Churchill) recalled the "dismay" on her mother's face when she first saw the ship's extravagant velvet and silver fittings, installed as a result of the free rein extended by Jerome to the upholsterer. Total cost of the vessel was $125,000 (equivalent to $2,500,000 in 2025).

=== Original engine controversy ===
While Clara Clarita was under construction, Jerome was persuaded by a number of acquaintances to avail himself of the services of E. N. Dickerson, a prominent patent lawyer with some novel engineering ideas. Impressed by Dickerson's claim that he could adapt an ordinary land engine to power Clara Clarita, saving both space and weight at no cost in performance, Jerome decided to hire him.

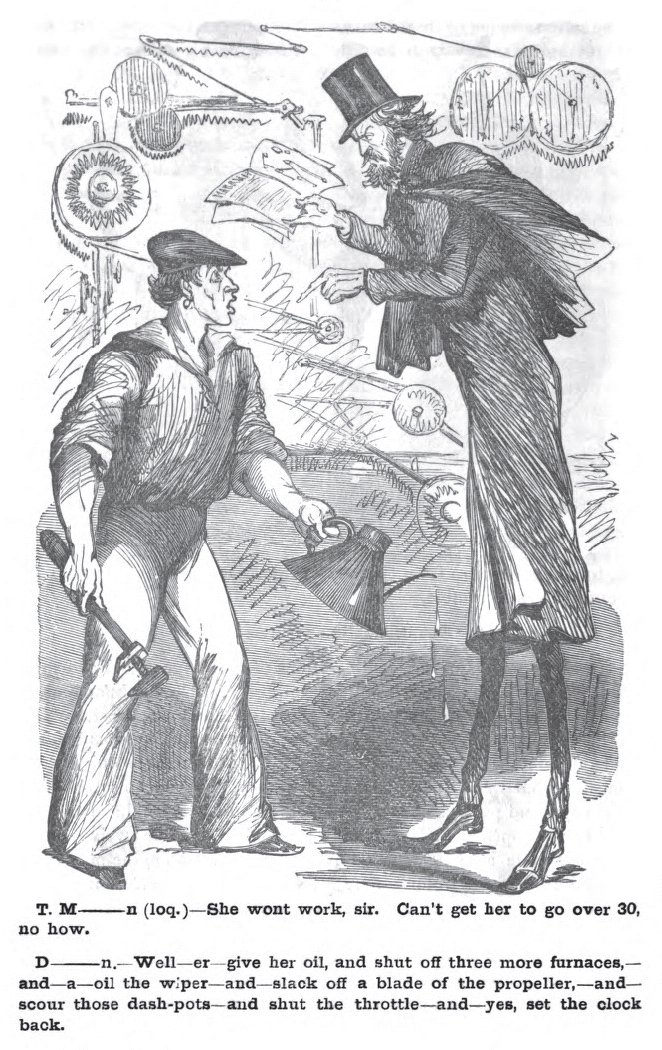
Contemporary cartoon published anonymously by a U.S. Navy officer, mocking Dickerson's engineering skills

For the adaptation, Dickerson purchased a $5,000, 50-horsepower (37 kW) stationary horizontal engine, with a 16-inch (410 mm) cylinder and 36-inch (910 mm) stroke, built by the Fishkill Landing Machine Works. Dickerson took eight months to adapt the engine to the yacht, at an overall cost of $16,178.08. On Clara Clarita's trial trip, Dickerson's engine adaptation proved a complete failure. After Dickerson failed to return to rectify the problems, Jerome hired two qualified engineers, who, after another trial, agreed that the machinery was unfit for service.

Because Dickerson was also known for his vocal criticism of the Chief of the US Navy's Bureau of Steam Engineering, Benjamin Isherwood, whose warship engine designs for the ongoing Civil War Dickerson claimed were slow and inefficient, the failure of Clara Clarita's engine soon came to public attention. After Dickerson was perceived to be attempting to shift the blame to others for the failure of his engine adaptation in a letter to The New York Times, his claims were rebuffed in the pages of the Times by several parties, including Jerome himself. Jerome described Clara Clarita's initial trial trip in the following terms:

We started from the Continental Works down the river. The day was fine, everything was in order, the model of the boat was pronounced perfection, and we started off with flying colors. Her machinery alone remained to be tried. To the best of my recollection we made one mile and a quarter in just two hours and a half. It was ... a brief if not a pleasant trip, to all on board—including myself—especially considering that I had waited eight months for the adaptation of this machinery. I could have had fifty engines built during this time notwithstanding the "Government pressure". We should have proceeded further down the river, but at Corlear's Hook we were driven back—by the tide.

Jerome's account, including his cited average speed of only 0.5 miles per hour (0.43 kn; 0.80 km/h), was corroborated by two further letters to the Times, from E. Riggs and Clara Clarita's commander, Captain Alex Smith. In his response, also published in the Times, Dickerson did not deny the abysmal performance of his engine adaptation, confining his comments instead to a denial of the charge that he had lied in his previous letter. The spectacular failure of the engine was not lost on Dickerson's enemies in the Navy Department, some of whom quickly published a satirical piece on him entitled Uncle Samuel's Whistle And What It Costs. The piece was later reproduced in Frank M. Bennett's book The Steam Navy of the United States.

=== Re-engine ===
After the failure of Dickerson's engine, Jerome went to a leading marine engineering firm, the Novelty Iron Works of New York, for a replacement. The Novelty Works supplied a pair of single-cylinder, inverted direct-acting engines with 22-inch (560 mm) bore and stroke, designed by J. V. Holmes and built under the supervision of W. W. Vanderbilt. The engines, described as "beautiful specimens of workmanship", were made more compact by the use of the engines' frame as the surface condenser, while the air-pump gearing was arranged to balance the moving parts. The engines operated a single four-bladed iron screw propeller, with a diameter of 9 feet (2.7 m) and pitch of 13 feet (4.0 m).

In a new trial trip on 28 July 1864, the engines attained a rate of 96 rpm, equivalent to about 12 miles per hour (10 kn; 19 km/h), while maintaining a "remarkably smooth and regular" action. It was noted however that the engines could be expected to "run much faster" in future.

== Service history ==
=== Jerome ownership, 1864–65 ===
In July 1865, about a year after Jerome took possession of Clara Clarita, a public clamour arose for the repair of the Gulf of St. Lawrence submarine telegraph cable, linking Newfoundland with the North American mainland, in time for the arrival of a new telegraph cable then being laid between Great Britain and Newfoundland by the steamship Great Eastern. Jerome decided to make Clara Clarita available for the task.

Accordingly, Clara Clarita departed New York with two cable experts and their assistants on 23 July, arriving at Halifax, Nova Scotia, on the 28th, having shown herself on the voyage to be "an excellent sea-boat". At Halifax, some brief preparations were made before the vessel continued on to Aspy Bay on Cape Breton Island, where the cable retrieval operation began. Clara Clarita's return was awaited with great anticipation, but when she finally arrived in the port of North Sydney, Nova Scotia on 11 August, it was with the disappointing news that the cable was damaged beyond repair. Clara Clarita returned to New York a few days later via Newport, Rhode Island.

Jerome's enthusiasm for yachting is said to have been considerably dampened by his experiences with Clara Clarita. In early November, after owning the vessel for only some 20 months, he sold her to the Pacific Mail Steamship Company for use as a towboat.

=== New York towboat and fireboat, 1865–early 1870s ===
Clara Clarita was converted into a towboat at Novelty Iron Works, after which, Pacific Mail employed her to tow its Atlantic Line vessels in and out of dock. In her new role, Clara Clarita soon established a reputation for herself as the fastest towboat in New York Harbor. In May 1870, the vessel was listed as a $30,000 asset in a Pacific Mail report.

Clara Clarita came into the possession of the New York Harbor Protective Company in 1870, when she was converted into a fireboat. In August 1870, Clara Clarita was towing a burning ferryboat out of harm's way when the tow rope burned through, allowing the ferry to collide with a schooner and set it on fire. In a later landmark ruling, the courts ruled that although the damage was caused by the ferry not the tug, and regardless of whether or not the schooner was anchored improperly, the tug was still at fault through negligently using a rope rather than a chain to tow the ferry.

=== Passenger steamer, 1870s ===
By 1873, Clara Clarita had undergone another conversion, to a passenger steamboat, although she retained the heavy brass fire monitors from her fireboat days. At this time, she was acquired by the Fox Island and Rockland Steamboat Company of Maine as competition for a rival steamer Ulysses, which had proven faster than the company's existing steamer Pioneer on the Vinalhaven to Rockland route. Clara Clarita quickly drove the challenger away with her superior speed, and as long as she remained on the route, was a popular vessel among passengers. Her owners, however, considered her a "coal hog" and soon replaced her with a more economical vessel. In this period of her career, Clara Clarita recorded the fastest ever time by a steamer across Penobscot Bay.

=== Maine tugboat, 1880s–1897 ===
By the mid-1880s, Clara Clarita had passed into the hands of the Knickerbocker Steam Towage Company and been converted into an oceangoing tug. Along with Ice King, Clara Clarita was one of the company's largest tugs.

On 22 August 1887, the steamboat City of Richmond struck a rock near the entrance to Millbridge and was immediately beached to prevent her sinking. Clara Clarita was dispatched with wrecking pumps from her homeport of Bath, Maine the same day to help refloat the vessel. City of Richmond was successfully hauled off the following day and towed to Mitchell's cove, where the damage was assessed as less than at first thought.

=== Massachusetts tugboat, 1897–1908 ===
Probably about 1897, Clara Clarita was sold to the Boston Towing Company, after which she was homeported briefly at Gloucester, Massachusetts and finally at Boston.

==== Spanish–American War ====
Following the outbreak of the Spanish–American War in April 1898, Clara Clarita was assigned to tow the ageing Civil War-era monitor USS Lehigh to a defensive station at Boston. On 3 May, Lehigh was towed to shelter in Vineyard Haven by Clara Clarita due to threatening weather in Vineyard Sound. The two vessels set off for Boston once more the following day, but Clara Clarita blew a boiler tube and was obliged to return to port. According to one report, Lehigh continued on without the tug's assistance, while another states that both Clara Clarita and Lehigh returned to port for a quick repair to Clara Clarita's boiler tube, which was expected to be completed in a few hours.

==== Various duties ====
In June 1898, Clara Clarita was used to tow "a string of eighteen new knock about yachts" from Marblehead, Massachusetts to New York. In August, Clara Clarita towed two specially-outfitted, chemically refrigerated barges, Fillid and J. K. Manning, to Burgeo, Newfoundland, for the purpose of loading herring and squid bait for American fishing bankers. The Newfoundland authorities however prohibited the transaction on the grounds that it would "completely revolutionize the purchase of bait" from Newfoundland by Americans. This decision cost the companies involved an estimated $50,000, who were described as "very foolish" for not seeking the approval of the local authorities beforehand. The following year, in November, Clara Clarita departed Boston with steam pumps and a lighter bound for Swan's Island, Maine, to salvage the coal cargo of the ship Pottsville which had sunk there.

==== Rescue at sea ====
In December 1902, while towing an oil barge from Rockland to Saint John, New Brunswick, the Standard Oil tug Astral was wrecked on Mount Desert Rock, Maine. The revenue cutter USRC Levi Woodbury managed to tow the barge and its crew to port on the night of 12 December, but due to heavy seas was unable to effect a rescue of Astral's crew, and was forced to return to Portland to re-coal. Clara Clarita, which had been in the vicinity preparing to salvage a sunken schooner, was called upon to stand by while Woodbury was absent.

On the 15th, Clara Clarita's crew effected the rescue themselves, braving the hazardous conditions by twice sending one of the tug's boats to retrieve Astral's crew from the Rock. The following January, Clara Clarita's captain, Alfred Sorensen, and two of his crew received heroism awards for the Astral rescue from the Massachusetts Humane Society. Since Sorensen had already received the Society's gold medal for an earlier rescue, he received a gold clasp, while the other two crew members received a bronze medal and $5 each.

==== Cathedral columns ====
In March 1899, the Bodwell Granite Company of Vinalhaven, Maine was contracted to supply eight massive 50-foot (15 m) granite columns for New York's Cathedral of St. John the Divine, then under construction. By 1903, the first of the columns was ready. A specially constructed barge, Benjamin Franklin, was built to transport the columns, two at a time, from Vinalhaven to New York. Clara Clarita was assigned the duty of towing the barge.

The first transport mission went smoothly enough, with Clara Clarita delivering the first two 130-ton columns after an eight-day voyage to the 134th Street Pier, Hudson River, New York, on 10 July 1903. During a later shipment in November, Clara Clarita ran into a gale off Cape Cod and the barge carrying the columns was almost sunk, forcing both vessels to put into Newport to await an improvement in the weather. After the delivery of all eight columns, it took more than a year to install them at the Cathedral site and begin work on the walls.

After a long and varied career spanning some 44 years, Clara Clarita was abandoned by her owners in 1908. She is said to have retained her yachting "speed wheel" to the last. In 1982, a color lithograph of the vessel was donated to the Farnsworth Art Museum.

== Bibliography ==
- Bennett, Frank M. (1897): The Steam Navy of the United States: A History of the Growth of the Steam Vessel of War in the U.S. Navy, and of the Naval Engineer Corps, 2nd Edition, pp. 517-526, 919-948; Warren & Company, Pittsburgh.
- Canfield, George L. (1921): The Law of the Sea: A Manual of the Principles of Admiralty Law for Students, Mariners, and Ship Operators, p. 166, D. Appleton & Co., New York and London.
- Churchill, Lady Randolph (aka Mrs George Cornwallis-West) (1909): The Reminiscences of Lady Randolph Churchill, p. 43, The Century Co., New York.
- Clews, Henry (1888): Twenty-Eight Years in Wall Street, p. 669, Irving Publishing Co., New York.
- Dana, William B., ed. (1870): The Merchants' Magazine and Commercial Review, Volume 63, p. 65, William B. Dana, New York.
- Day, Thomas Fleming, ed. (1912): The Rudder, Volume XXVIII, p. 92, The Rudder Publishing Company, New York.
- Farwell, Raymond F. (1941): The Rules of the Nautical Road, pp. 233-235, United States Naval Institute, Annapolis, Maryland.
- Richardson, John M. (1941): Steamboat Lore of the Penobscot, pp. 73-75, Kennebec Journal Print Shop, Augusta.
- Swann, Leonard Alexander Jr. (1965): John Roach, Maritime Entrepreneur: the Years as Naval Contractor 1862-1886, p. 56; United States Naval Institute (reprinted 1980 by Ayer Publishing, ISBN 978-0-405-13078-6).
- Weir, Robert (1864): Uncle Samuel's Whistle And What It Costs, publisher unknown.
- United States government (1865–1908): List of Merchant Vessels of the United States, Government Printing Office, Washington, D.C.
