= USS Isaac Smith =

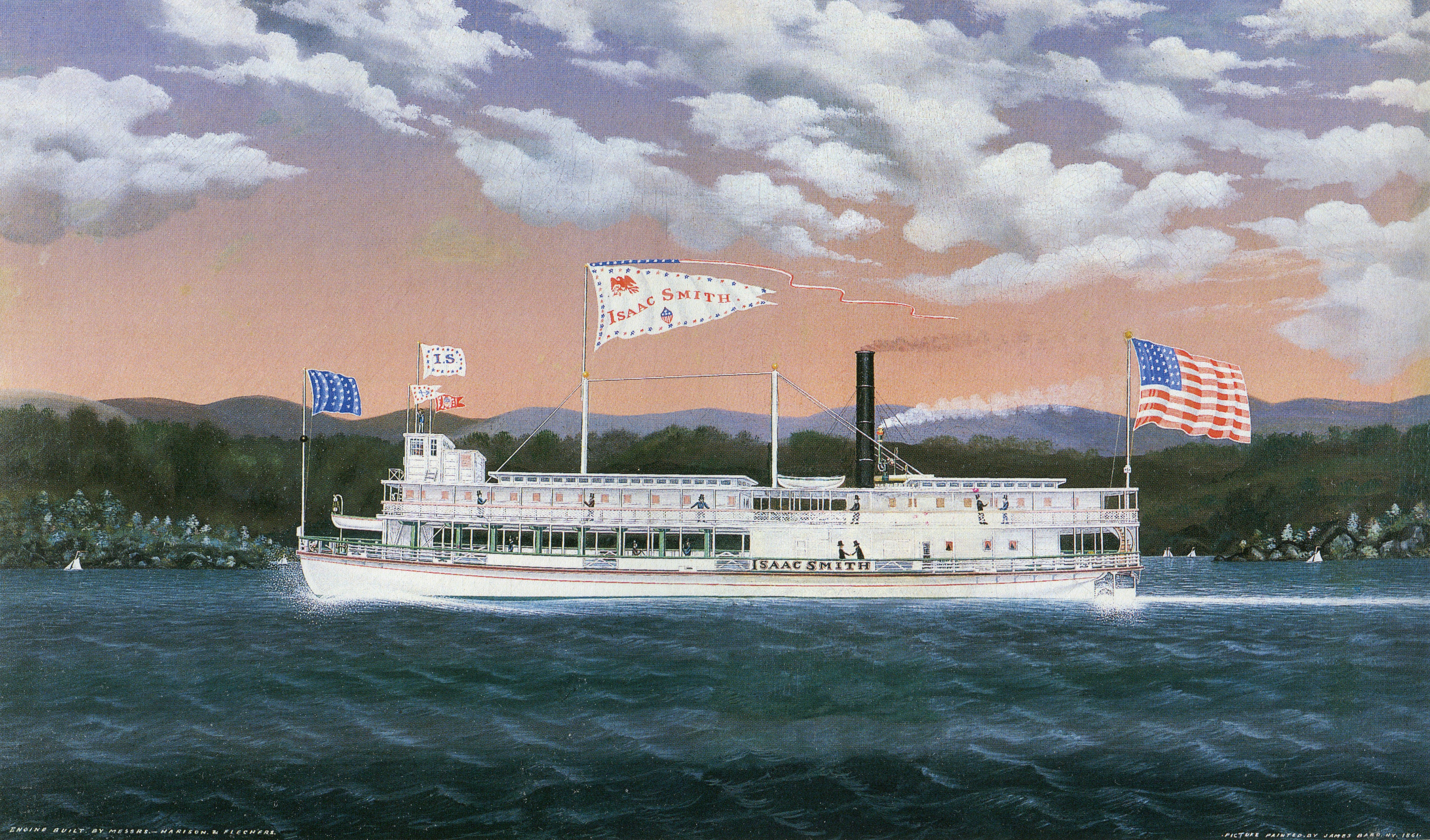
- Isaac Smith in commercial service, 1861. Her upper deck, seen here, was removed for Navy service

History

United States
- Name: USS Isaac Smith
- Namesake: Previous name retained
- Owner: Early 1861: Hamilton & Smith; September 1861: United States Navy
- Builder: Lawrence & Foulks (New York City)
- Completed: 1861
- Acquired: 9 September 1861
- Commissioned: 17 October 1861
- Fate: Captured by Confederate forces 30 January 1863

History

Confederate States of America
- Name: CSS Stono
- Namesake: Stono River
- Acquired: 30 January 1863
- Commissioned: 1863
- Fate: Wrecked 5 June 1863

General characteristics
- Displacement: 453 tons
- Length: 171 ft 6 in (52.27 m)
- Beam: 31 ft 4 in (9.55 m)
- Draught: 9 ft (2.7 m)
- Propulsion: steam engine; screw-propelled
- Speed: not known
- Complement: 56
- Armament: one 30-pounder Parrott rifle; eight 8" Dahlgren smoothbores

USS Isaac Smith was a screw steamer acquired by the United States Navy during the American Civil War. She was used by the Union Navy to patrol navigable waterways of the Confederate States of America to prevent the Confederacy from trading with other countries. In 1863, she was captured by Confederate land forces. She then served in the Confederate States Navy as CSS Stono until she was wrecked.

== Construction and acquisition ==
Isaac Smith was built by Lawrence & Foulks in 1861 for passenger-cargo service on the Hudson River in New York. She was purchased by the U.S. Navy in New York City from E. J. Hamilton 9 September 1861. She was armed and on 17 October 1861 was commissioned as USS Isaac Smith.

== United States Navy service ==
=== South Atlantic Blockading Squadron ===
On 16 October 1861, Isaac Smith was assigned to the South Atlantic Blockading Squadron in time to join Flag Officer Samuel F. Du Pont′s assault against Port Royal, South Carolina. An intense hurricane occurred during the voyage south compelling the ship to jettison her guns. Nevertheless, she assisted the United States Marine Corps transport Governor – a sidewheel paddle steamer bound for Port Royal carrying 650 passengers, including a battalion of 385 United States Marines, and a cargo of 19,000 rounds of ammunition – taking Governor under tow after Governor became disabled during the storm. Despite her efforts, Governor foundered off Cape Hatteras, North Carolina, during the storm on 3 November 1861 with the loss of six lives.

During a reconnaissance in force on 4 and 5 November 1861, Isaac Smith engaged and repelled three attacking Confederate steamers and silenced batteries at Hilton Head and Bay Point, South Carolina. Two days later she towed sailing sloop-of-war Vandalia into action during the landings which wrested Port Royal from Confederate hands providing the Union a base for the fleet and for combined U.S. Navy-Union Army operations against the Confederacy.

=== Georgia and Florida operations ===
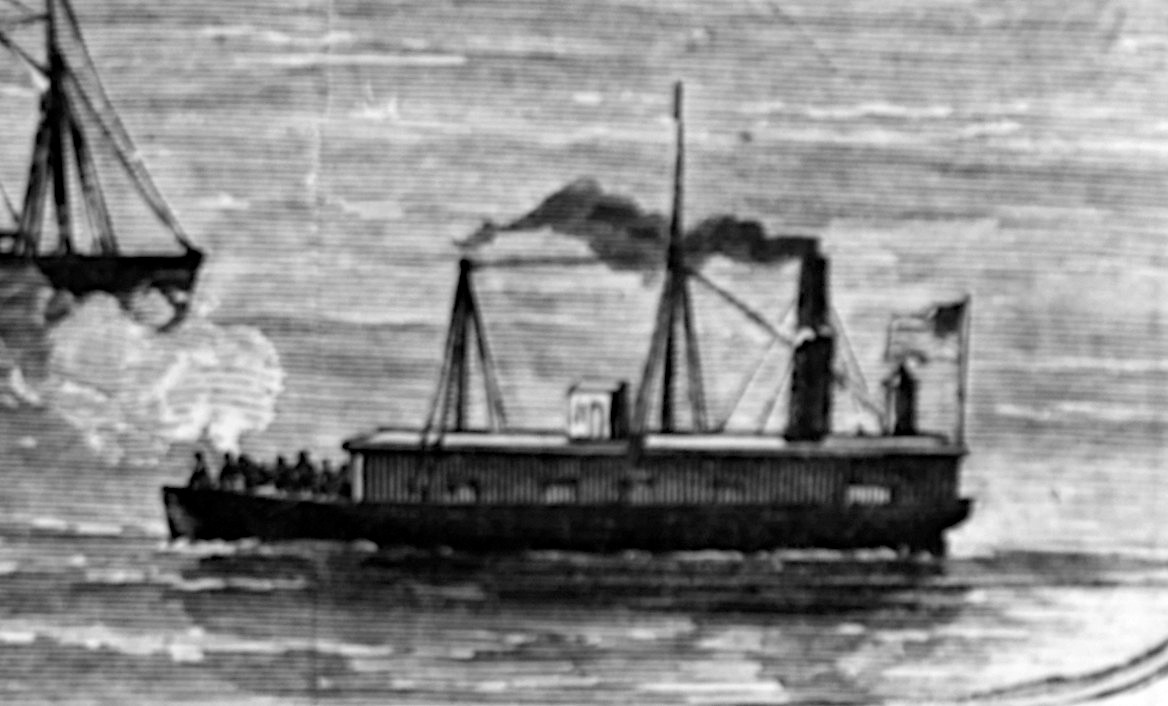
Isaac Smith in naval service, 1861

Isaac Smith participated in operations against the coast of South Carolina until 21 January 1862 when she left to join the expedition to Savannah, Georgia, led by Captain Charles H. Davis, USN, and Brigadier General Horatio G. Wright of the United States Army. This operation was primarily a diversionary effort to cover up a projected attack on Fernandina, Florida, but it also provided valuable information about Confederate defenses of the water approaches to Savannah, and it interrupted communications between Fort Pulaski and Savannah.

During the latter half of March and all of April 1862, Isaac Smith was active in the vicinity of St. Augustine, Florida. She took possession of the post office there on 18 March 1862 and two days later mounted a gun on the ramparts of Fort Marion in a position to command the main road to the city. She also enforced the Union blockade of the Confederacy, and her boats captured the blockade runner British Empire 3 April 1862.

Isaac Smith stood out of St. Augustine and entered the St. Johns River on 4 May 1862 to begin a period of three months' service in the vicinity of Jacksonville, Florida. Her presence there helped tighten the blockade, provided sanctuary for refugees, drew Confederate troops away from more active fronts, and facilitated Union intelligence activity.

In need of repair, Isaac Smith sailed for New York City on 10 August 1862 for "beaching, breeming, and improvements."

=== Capture by Confederate forces ===
Isaac Smith returned to her squadron on 11 October 1862. Then Rear Admiral Du Pont ordered her to the Stono River, where she served until 30 January 1863. That day she was caught in a crossfire from masked shore batteries. with Isaac Smith disabled by accurate fire and with her deck covered with wounded men, her captain surrendered the ship rather than risk their lives. Eight men were dead and 17 were wounded.

== Confederate States Navy service ==
After her capture, the ship served in the Confederate States Navy in the waters around Charleston, South Carolina, under the name CSS Stono until she was wrecked on the breakwater near Fort Moultrie, South Carolina, while attempting to run the blockade with a load of cotton on 5 June 1863. No data on salvage operations for Stono has been found, but the Official Records of the Union and Confederate Navies in the War of the Rebellion state that she was "burned by the Confederates at the evacuation of Charleston in 1865."

== See also ==
- Confederate States Navy
