= Erik Heyl =

American maritime historian and illustrator

- Born: August 4, 1887; Milwaukee, Wisconsin
- Died: July 15, 1973 (aged 85); Buffalo, New York
- Known for: work as a marine historian and illustrator
- Notable work: Early American Steamers (six volumes)

Erik Heyl (1887–1973) was an American maritime historian and illustrator. He is best known as the author of Early American Steamers, a six-volume work that incorporates illustrations, technical details and service histories of almost 800 steamboats and steamships built mainly in the United States between 1807 and 1870.

Heyl was prominent in a number of American marine historical societies, particularly those related to the history of the Great Lakes. He also gave several exhibitions of his work as a marine illustrator during his lifetime. He was named Great Lakes Historian of the Year in 1972.

== Life and career ==
Erik Heyl—birth name Johann Erik Philip Heyl—was born on August 4, 1887, in Milwaukee, Wisconsin, to Jacob and Louise (née Schandein) Heyl. Erik was the only child of the union, as his mother died a few months after his birth, but shortly thereafter, Jacob married his late wife's younger sister Clare, and Erik thereby subsequently acquired a number of step-siblings. Erik's maternal grandfather was Emil Schandein, vice-president of the Pabst Brewing Company and a principal shareholder in the firm. In 1906, an out-of-court settlement following a contest of the will of Emil's widow resulted in Erik and an aunt and uncle each receiving a share of the Schandein estate, Erik's being $500,000 (equivalent to $17,917,000 in 2025), which was to be held in trust.

Heyl was educated at Milwaukee Academy and later the University of Berlin. Shortly before the outbreak of World War I he moved to Buffalo, New York, where he embarked on an accountancy career. According to census records, he later worked as a real estate agent, stock and bond salesman and secretary with the ambulance service, before starting his own business as a stamp dealer.

Through his philately, Heyl became intrigued by the fact that some old stamps bore the names of steamboats, which at one time had been involved in the distribution of mail. He began collecting images of these steamboats, which in turn developed into an interest in researching the vessels themselves. He eventually became a recognized authority on 19th-century American steam vessels, with a particular expertise in Great Lakes steamers which had seen naval service during the American Civil War. He also became a marine illustrator, creating scale drawings and models of old steamboats and steamships derived from the many images he had collected from a variety of sources. Several exhibitions of his artwork were held during his lifetime.

Heyl has been described as a "driving force" behind the Buffalo Marine Historical Society, serving for a time as its president, and he was also president of the Erie County Historical Society. He was a frequent contributor to Inland Seas, the journal of the Great Lakes Historical Society, and to Steamboat Bill of Facts and The Detroit Marine Historian, respectively the journals of the Steamship Historical Society of America and the Marine Historical Society of Detroit. He was named 1972 Great Lakes Historian of the Year by the latter organization. He was also the recipient of the 1964 Samuel Wilkinson Award from the Buffalo and Erie County Historical Society.

=== Early American Steamers ===
Heyl's best-known work is the mammoth Early American Steamers, published by Heyl himself in six volumes sequentially between 1953 and 1969. The work as a whole is 2094 pages long, with the separate volumes ranging from 284 pages in length (volume II) to 467 pages (volume I). The final volume includes entries both for previously uncovered ships as well as revised entries for some vessels covered in earlier volumes, in addition to a comprehensive index to the vessels covered in all six volumes.

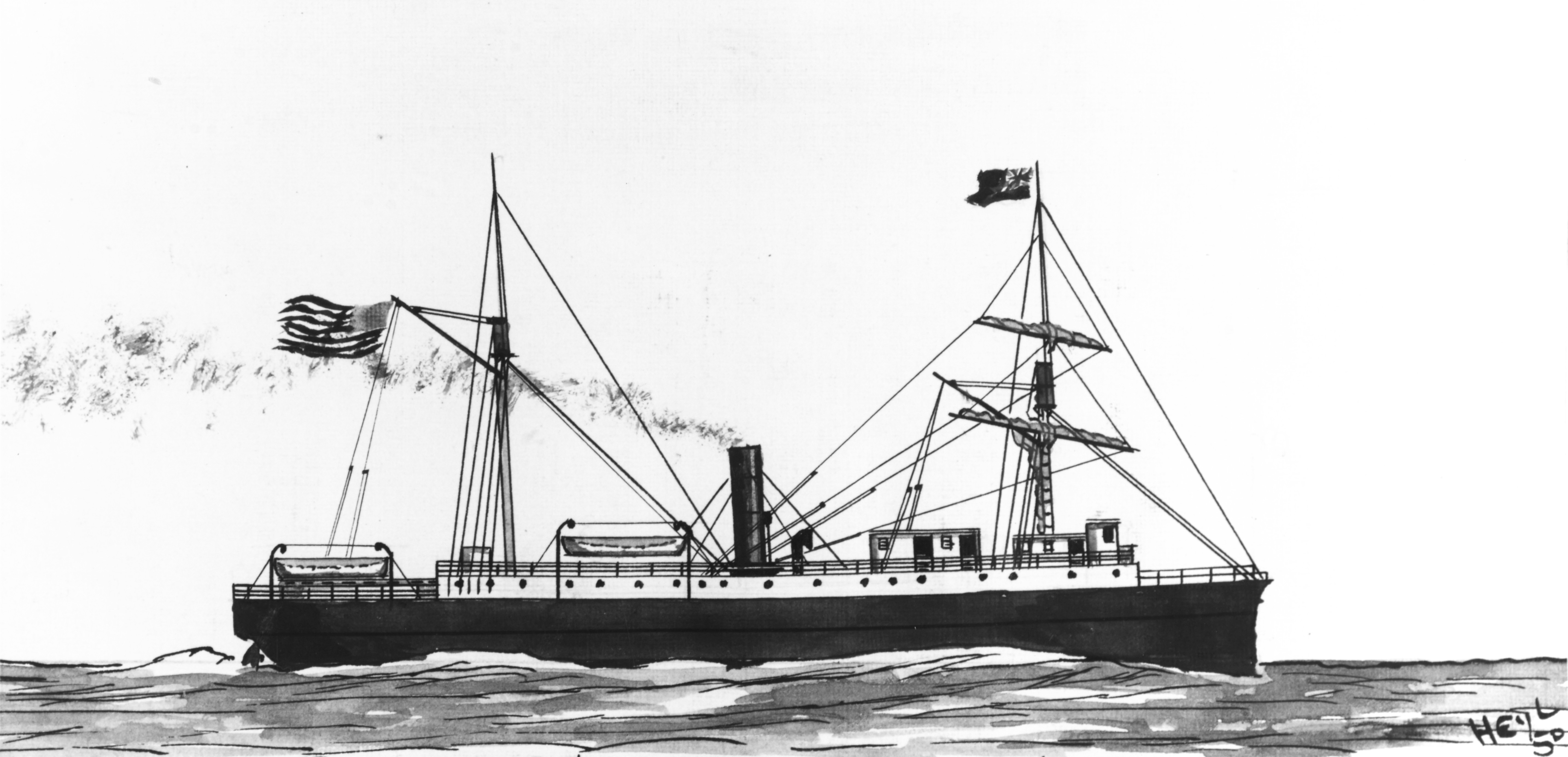
A typical watercolor from Early American Steamers, in this case of the coastal steamer Worcester, built in 1863

A total of about 800 steamboats and steamships built in the United States between 1807 and 1872 are covered in the work, with the emphasis heavily on Great Lakes and East Coast vessels. A small number of steamers built in Canada or the United Kingdom, and which saw significant service in American waters, are also included. Data for each vessel, where available, includes: year of construction; ship name changes; shipbuilder; engine builder; engine type and size; propulsion type; hull type (usually either wood or iron); hull dimensions; registered tonnage; list of sister ships if any; and in most cases, a comprehensive list of registered owners. The data section is followed by a service history of the vessel covering the most significant events in its career. Service histories are usually a single page in length, but for vessels with more colorful careers, they can run to several pages.

The majority of entries include an ink-and-watercolor illustration of the ship by Heyl; all illustrations are to a consistent 1:610 scale. Some entries have no illustration, while a few—where, for example, the ship's appearance substantially changed after a rebuild—have two or more. In the first two volumes, the reproductions are quite small—2.5 inches (6.4 cm) high, with a variable width depending on the ship size, and the color (and text) is reddish-brown. From the third volume on, the images are considerably larger at 3.5 inches (8.9 cm) in height, allowing for greater detail, while the width is a consistent 7 inches (18 cm); reproduction is in grayscale.

Early American Steamers has become a standard reference work and is included in bibliographies of many academic books in the field. (Note: Some examples—.) Professor of History René de la Pedraja of Canisius College, New York, has described it as "the essential source" for 19th-century American steam vessels built before 1880.

=== Personal details ===
Heyl married Alice Emily Spragge (born 1893) in Buffalo, New York, on October 8, 1912. The couple had one daughter, Barbara Alice (1918–2003). Heyl's second marriage was to Elizabeth Solvieg Ralph, the ceremony taking place at Erie, Pennsylvania, on March 4, 1929. The couple had two children, Peter (1931–1951) and a daughter, Kristen.

Erik Heyl died on July 15, 1973, at the Millard Fillmore Hospital, Buffalo, following several weeks of illness; he was 85 years of age. He was survived by his wife and daughters. The following year, his papers were donated by his widow to Bowling Green State University, where as of 2021 they were still held.

Heyl's remains are held in the Columbarium at the Episcopal Church of the Good Shepherd, Buffalo, NY. His widow Elizabeth, who later remarried, is also interred there.

== Notable works ==
- Early American Steamers. Vol. I. Buffalo, New York: Erik Heyl. 1953. 467 pages. OCLC 1626009
- Early American Steamers. Vol. II. Buffalo, New York: Erik Heyl. 1956. 284 pages. OCLC 1626009
- Early American Steamers. Vol. III. Buffalo, New York: Erik Heyl. 1964. 354 pages. OCLC 1626009
- Early American Steamers. Vol. IV. Buffalo, New York: Erik Heyl. 1965. 346 pages. OCLC 1626009
- Early American Steamers. Vol. V. Buffalo, New York: Erik Heyl. 1967. 304 pages. OCLC 1626009
- Early American Steamers. Vol. VI. Buffalo, New York: Erik Heyl. 1969. 339 pages. OCLC 1626009
