= Buchanan House =

Buchanan House may refer to:

- Tompkins-Buchanan House, Louisville, Kentucky, listed on the National Register of Historic Places listings in Old Louisville, Kentucky
- Buchanan House (Roachville, Kentucky), listed on the National Register of Historic Places in Green County, Kentucky
- Buchanan House (Annapolis, Maryland), official residence of the superintendent of the United States Naval Academy
- Stevens-Buchanan House, Brandon, Mississippi, listed on the National Register of Historic Places listings in Rankin County, Mississippi
- Wheatland (James Buchanan House), former residence of President James Buchanan outside of Lancaster, Pennsylvania
- Buchanan House (Decatur, Tennessee), listed on the National Register of Historic Places in Meigs County, Tennessee
- I.W.P. Buchanan House, Lebanon, Tennessee, listed on the National Register of Historic Places listings in Wilson County, Tennessee
- James Buchanan House (Nashville, Tennessee), listed on the National Register of Historic Places in Davidson County, Tennessee
- J. C. Buchanan House, Bastrop, Texas, listed on the National Register of Historic Places listings in Bastrop County, Texas
- Buchanan-Hayter-Witherspoon House, Mansfield, Texas, listed on the National Register of Historic Places listings in Tarrant County, Texas
- Dr. Trueblood House, Kirkland, Washington, also known as Buchanan House, listed on the National Register of Historic Places listings in King County, Washington
- Buchanan House, later Scotrail House, an office building on the former site of Buchanan Street railway station that served as Scotrail's headquarters

== See also ==
- James Buchanan House (disambiguation)
