= Pearl Street =

Pearl Street may refer to:

- Pearl Street (Manhattan)
  - Pearl Street Station
- Pearl Street (Albany, New York)
- Pearl Street (Reading, Massachusetts)
  - Pearl Street School
- Pearl Street (Cincinnati, Ohio)
  - Pearl Street Market
- Pearl Street (Boulder, Colorado)
  - Pearl Street Mall

== See also ==
- Pearl Street Historic District (disambiguation)
- Pearl Street Schoolhouse
