= Pearl Street Historic District =

Pearl Street Historic District may refer to:

- Pearl Street Historic District (Burlington, Vermont)
- Pearl Street Historic District (Brandon, Mississippi), listed on the National Register of Historic Places in Rankin County, Mississippi

== See also ==
- Pearl Street Mall, Boulder, Colorado
