= Rankin County School District =

School district in Mississippi

Coordinates: 32.282200°N 90.004490°W

Location
- 1220 Apple Park Place; Brandon, MS 39042 United States

District information
- Type: Public
- Grades: Pre-K - 12th
- Established: 1940
- Superintendent: Dr. Scott Rimes
- Schools: 27
- NCES District ID: 2803830

Students and staff
- Students: 19,000+
- Staff: 3,000+

Other information
- Website: www.rcsd.ms

The Rankin County School District is the 2nd largest public school district in Mississippi. The district office is located in Brandon, Mississippi (USA).

The district covers all areas of Rankin County except for those in the Pearl city limits. The district's boundary includes, in addition to Brandon, the communities of Florence, Flowood, Pelahatchie, Puckett, Richland, Sandhill, and Star. The portion of Jackson in Rankin County is in this school district.

== History ==
The Rankin County School District is one of the top three sizeable public school districts in Mississippi. There are 28 schools, over 18,000 students in the district, and the district serves over seven different cities. RCSD is known for their recreational and outdoor activities. In 2013, RCSD was the defendant in a federal lawsuit regarding religion in public schools after Northwest Rankin High School subjected students to mandatory Christian assemblies. The case settled, but in 2014 the RCSD violated the settlement by inviting a Methodist preacher to lead a prayer during a District wide awards ceremony. Judge Carlton Reeves of Mississippi's Southern District ruled in favor of the Plaintiff in 2015. In 2014 board president Cecil McCrory, a former member of the Mississippi Legislature, resigned from his position prior to a federal indictment for corruption activities, involving private prison contracts with the Mississippi Department of Corrections. McCrory and Epps pleaded guilty to federal charges in February of the following year.

== Schools ==
- Brandon Zone
  - Brandon High School (Grades 9-12)
  - Brandon Middle School (Grades 6-8)
  - Brandon Elementary School (Grades 4-5)
  - StoneBridge Elementary School (Grades 2-3)
  - Rouse Elementary School (Grades K-1)
  - Learning Center
- Florence Zone
  - Florence High School (Grades 9-12)
  - Florence Middle School (Grades 6-8)
  - Florence Elementary School (Grades 3-5)
  - Steen's Creek Elementary School (Grades K-2)
- McLaurin Zone
  - McLaurin High School (Grades 7-12)
  - McLaurin Elementary School (Grades PK-6)
- Northwest Zone
  - Northwest Rankin High School (Grades 9-12)
  - Northwest Rankin Middle School (Grades 6-8)
  - Northwest Rankin Elementary School (Grades K-5)
  - Flowood Elementary School (Grades K-5)
  - Highland Bluff Elementary School (Grades K-5)
  - Northshore Elementary School (Grades K-5)
  - Oakdale Elementary School (Grades K-5)
- Pelahatchie Zone
  - Pelahatchie High School (Grades 7-12)
  - Pelahatchie Elementary School (Grades K-6)
- Pisgah Zone
  - Pisgah High School (Grades 7-12)
  - Pisgah Elementary School (Grades K-6)
- Puckett Zone
  - Puckett Attendance Center (Grades K-12)
- Richland Zone
  - Richland High School (Grades 7-12)
  - Richland Upper Elementary School (Grades 3-6)
  - Richland Elementary School (Grades K-2)
- Alternative School
  - Rankin County Learning Center

== Demographics ==
In 2017, 22% of the students were black. That year, under Mississippi school accountability rankings, the district received an "A".

=== 2006-07 school year ===
There were a total of 17,398 students enrolled in the Rankin County School District during the 2006–2007 school year. The gender makeup of the district was 49% female and 51% male. The racial makeup of the district was 21.54% African American, 75.91% White, 1.32% Hispanic, 1.14% Asian, and 0.09% Native American. 27.7% of the district's students were eligible to receive free lunch.

=== Previous school years ===
School Year	Enrollment	Gender Makeup		Racial Makeup				
School Year	Enrollment	Female	Male	Asian	African American	Hispanic	Native American	White
2005-06	17,268	49%	51%	1.09%	21.53%	1.15%	0.08%	76.15%
2004-05	16,395	49%	51%	0.89%	21.09%	1.12%	0.07%	76.83%
2003-04	16,014	49%	51%	0.94%	21.47%	0.92%	0.07%	76.70%
2002-03	15,528	48%	52%	0.78%	21.13%	0.79%	0.08%	77.22%

== Accountability statistics ==
	2006-07	2005-06	2004-05	2003-04	2002-03
District Accreditation Status	Accredited	Accredited	Accredited	Accredited	Accredited
School Performance Classifications
Level 5 (Superior Performing) Schools	11	10	7	8	4
Level 4 (Exemplary) Schools	7	7	10	8	8
Level 3 (Successful) Schools	3	4	4	4	8
Level 2 (Under Performing) Schools	0	0	1	0	0
Level 1 (Low Performing) Schools	0	0	0	0	0
Not Assigned	4	4	1	2	2

== See also ==
- List of school districts in Mississippi
