= Cocke-Martin-Jackson House =

Historic house in Mississippi, United States

- Cocke--Martin--Jackson House
- U.S. National Register of Historic Places
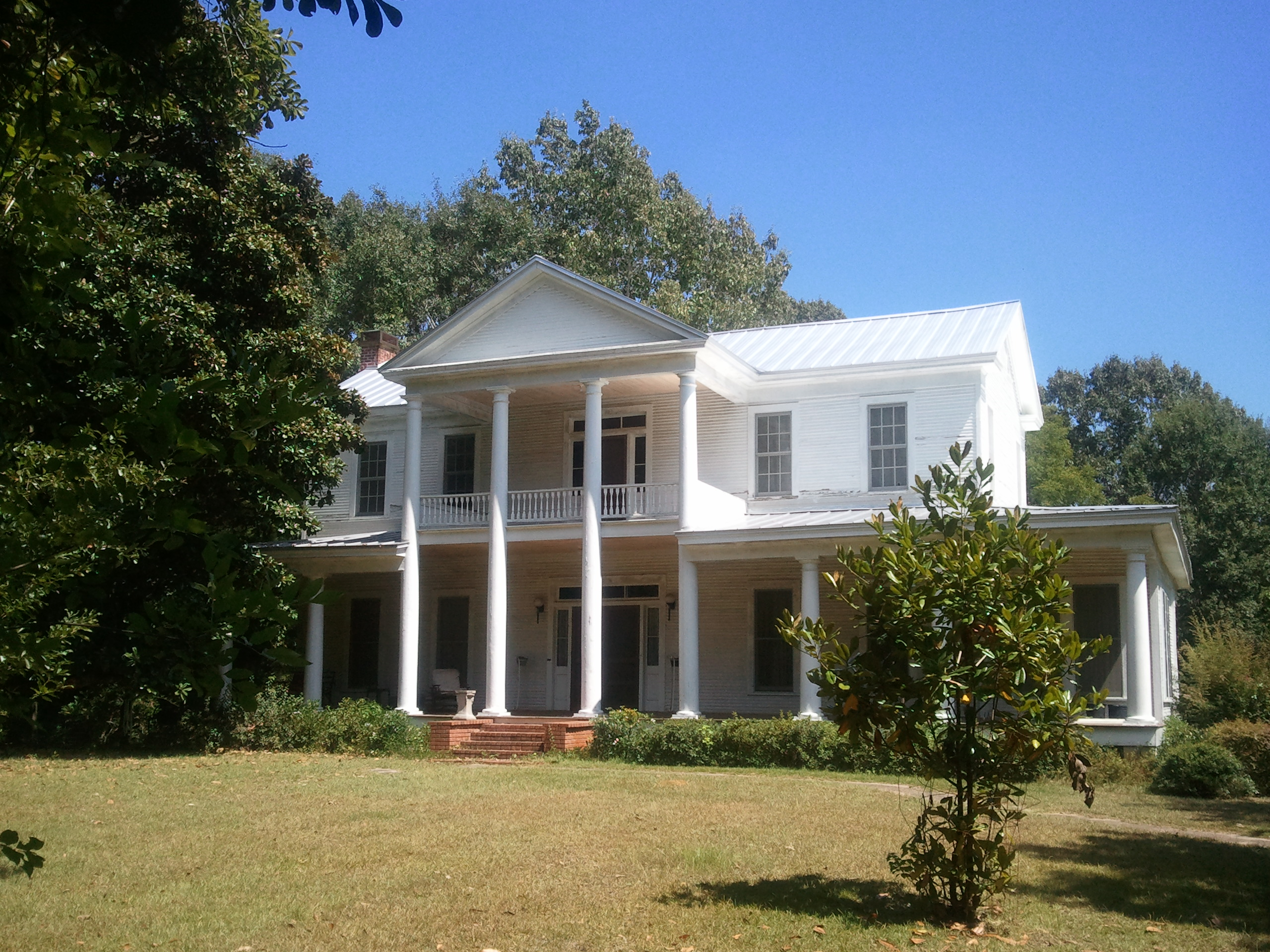
- The Cocke-Martin-Jackson House in 2013

- Location within Mississippi Location within the United States
- Location: 107 Pleasant Street, Brandon, Mississippi
- Coordinates: 32°16′18″N 89°58′51″W
- Area: less than one acre
- Built: 1840
- Built by: Thomas Baytop Cocke,
- Architectural style: Greek Revival, Colonial Revival
- MPS: Brandon MPS
- NRHP reference No.: 97000799
- Added to NRHP: August 1, 1997

The Cocke-Martin-Jackson House is a historic mansion in Brandon, Mississippi, United States.

== History ==
The two-story mansion was built from 1840 to 1845 for Thomas Baytop Cocke, a farmer. It was purchased by Charles Lyman Martin in 1891. When their daughter Ella May married Eugene Edgar Jackson in 1894, they purchased more land and turned it into a 1,500-acre (610 ha) plantation. Several decades later, it was inherited by their son, Eugene Anselum Jackson, who restored it in the 1930s.

The property was purchased by Henry Allen in 1942, with only 10 acres (4.0 ha) left. By the late 1990s, it belonged to their son, Albert Allen.

== Architectural significance ==
It has been listed on the National Register of Historic Places since August 1, 1997.
