= Pelahatchie High School =

School in Mississippi, United States

Coordinates: 32.3107°N 89.7965°W

Location
- 213 Brooks Street; Pelahatchie, Rankin County, Mississippi; United States

Information
- Motto: "Our Tribe, Our Pride"
- School district: Rankin County School District
- Superintendent: Sue Townsend
- Principal: Teague Burchfield
- Staff: 36.79 (FTE)
- Grades: 7–12
- Enrollment: 348 (2023–2024)
- Student to teacher ratio: 9.46
- Colors: Red, black and white
- Mascot: Chief
- Website: phs.rcsd.ms

Pelahatchie High School, also known as Pelahatchie Attendance Center, is located in Pelahatchie, Mississippi, serving students in grades 7–12 and having a population of about 380 students.

== History ==
The school was established within the 1870s. By 1891, Pelahatchie was one of the only three schools in the Rankin Country area. Today, the school is part of the Rankin County School District, which serves 28 schools in Mississippi.

== Athletics ==
Pelahatchie High School features several athletic programs, including football, cheerleading, girls and boys basketball, girls and boys soccer, slow pitch and fast pitch softball, baseball, tennis, and archery.

== Clubs and organizations ==
The school has several clubs on campus which include Student Council, FFA, FCA, Beta Club, print journalism, book club, JROTC, and yearbook.

- The Pelahatchie High School Band .

== Awards and recognition ==
- Governors Award for Exemplary Partnerships 2018 (Basic Manufacturing Skills in partnership with Multicraft International
- Governors Award for Exemplary Partnerships 2018 (Pride of Pelahatchie Marching Band in partnership with the Mississippi Symphonic Band / Mississippi Swing)
- 2010 Distinguished Title I School
- Energy Star School 2011, 2012, 2013, 2014, 2015, 2016
- STEM and Academy Design Pilot (Basic Manufacturing Skills in conjunction with Multicraft International and Hinds Community College, Agriculture and Natural Resources, and JROTC)
