= Pisgah High School =

Pisgah High School may refer to:

- Pisgah High School (Mississippi)
- Pisgah High School (North Carolina)
