= James Buchanan House =

James Buchanan House may refer to:

- James Buchanan House (Nashville, Tennessee), listed on the National Register of Historic Places in Davidson County, Tennessee
- Wheatland (James Buchanan House), former residence of President James Buchanan outside of Lancaster, Pennsylvania

== See also ==
- Buchanan House (disambiguation)
