= John McLaurin =

John McLaurin may refer to:

- John C. McLaurin (1926–2004), American politician from Mississippi
- John L. McLaurin (1860–1934), American politician from South Carolina
