= National Register of Historic Places listings in Rankin County, Mississippi =

Location of Rankin County in Mississippi

This is a list of the National Register of Historic Places listings in Rankin County, Mississippi.

This is intended to be a complete list of the properties and districts on the National Register of Historic Places in Rankin County, Mississippi, United States. Latitude and longitude coordinates are provided for many National Register properties and districts; these locations may be seen together in a map.

There are 14 properties and districts listed on the National Register in the county. Another property was once listed but has been removed.

This National Park Service list is complete through NPS recent listings posted May 2, 2025.

== Listings ==
| | Name on the Register | Image | Date listed | Location | City or town | Description |
|---|---|---|---|---|---|---|
| 1 | Armstrong Site (22RA576) | | February 2, 1987 (#86003686) | Address restricted | Goshen Springs | |
| 2 | Brandon Cemetery | Brandon Cemetery | November 18, 2010 (#10000925) | Corner of Old Depot Rd. and Mississippi Highway 471 Extension; 32°16′33″N 89°59′31″W | Brandon | Old Brandon Cemetery |
| 3 | Brandon South College Street Historic District | | September 23, 2020 (#100005646) | Bounded by South College St., East Sunset Dr. to Bentonwood Dr., jct. of South College St. and MS 468, West Sunset and Prescott Drs., and West Jasper Sts. 32°15′55″N 89°59′19″W | Brandon | |
| 4 | Byram Bridge | Byram Bridge | May 23, 1979 (#79003427) | Old Byram and Florence Rd. 32°10′35″N 90°14′37″W | Frenchs Store | Extends into Hinds County |
| 5 | Cocke-Martin-Jackson House | Cocke-Martin-Jackson House | August 1, 1997 (#97000799) | 107 Pleasant St. 32°16′18″N 89°58′51″W | Brandon | |
| 6 | Downtown Brandon Historic District | Downtown Brandon Historic District | November 18, 2010 (#10000926) | East and West Government Sts. from Timber St. to College St., 100 blocks of North College St. and Black St. 32°16′23″N 89°59′16″W | Brandon | |
| 7 | Hebron Academy | Hebron Academy | May 5, 1978 (#78001627) | South of Brandon on Mississippi Highway 18; 32°13′49″N 89°56′36″W | Brandon | Hebron Academy in 2013 |
| 8 | Misterfeldt Home Place | | December 18, 1986 (#86003496) | 1101 Old U.S. Route 49, S. 32°12′57″N 90°09′52″W | Richland | |
| 9 | Pearl Street Historic District | Pearl Street Historic District | August 1, 1997 (#97000798) | 200-204 Pearl St. 32°16′32″N 89°59′26″W | Brandon | |
| 10 | Piney Woods Country Life School Historic District | | September 24, 2020 (#100005616) | 5009 US 49 South; 32°03′44″N 89°59′34″W | Piney Woods | |
| 11 | Rankin County Confederate Monument | Rankin County Confederate Monument | August 1, 1997 (#97000797) | Junction of Government and North Sts. 32°16′33″N 89°59′12″W | Brandon | Confederate monument with Rankin County Courthouse in background |
| 12 | Rankin County Courthouse | Rankin County Courthouse | August 1, 1997 (#97000796) | 301 Town Sq. 32°16′24″N 89°59′11″W | Brandon | |
| 13 | South College Street Historic District | | March 5, 1998 (#98000183) | 625-713 S. College St. 32°15′23″N 89°59′21″W | Brandon | |
| 14 | Stevens-Buchanan House | Stevens-Buchanan House | May 5, 1978 (#78001628) | 505 College St. 32°16′07″N 89°59′20″W | Brandon | |
| 15 | Turcotte House | | June 4, 1987 (#86002869) | Southeast of Brandon on Mississippi Highway 17; 32°11′00″N 89°54′58″W | Brandon | |
| 16 | Woodrow Wilson Bridge | Woodrow Wilson Bridge | November 16, 1988 (#88002485) | Spans the Pearl River on Silas Brown St. 32°17′22″N 90°10′44″W | Jackson | Extends into Hinds County |

== Former listing ==
| | Name on the Register | Image | Date listed | Date removed | Location | City or town | Description |
|---|---|---|---|---|---|---|---|
| 1 | Lessel House | | September 11, 1980 (#80002302) | June 19, 1987 | Railroad St. and Brooks Ave. | Pelahatchie | Demolished in 1986 |

== See also ==
- List of National Historic Landmarks in Mississippi
- National Register of Historic Places listings in Mississippi
