= Pisgah High School (Mississippi) =

Location
- 115 Tori Bowie Lane; Brandon, MS 39047; United States
- 32.4848°N 89.8692°W

Information
- School district: Rankin County School District
- Principal: Craig Yates
- Teaching staff: 26.92 (FTE)
- Grades: 7–12
- Gender: Coeducational
- Enrollment: 483 (2023-2024)
- Student to teacher ratio: 13.08
- Campus type: Rural
- Colors: Green, Black and White
- Mascot: Dragon
- Team name: Dragons
- Website: pih.rcsd.ms

Pisgah High School is a conjoined middle and high school located in Sandhill, Mississippi, United States, with a Brandon postal address. It is part of the Rankin County School District as a 3A school. As of 2017, it had over 380 students. The principal is Craig Yates.

== Athletics ==
Pisgah has a rich sports history, especially in Football, Track and Field, Women's Basketball, Powerlifting, and Bowling. The Track and Field teams have won numerous state championships, and the Women's Basketball team has a lone state championship accompanied by many semifinal appearances. They recently have seen a surge in their softball, baseball, and archery teams as well, all making deep strides in state tournaments.

== Arts ==
Pisgah High School, despite their small size and rural character, has a strong presence in their art departments. They run a small division showchoir, named "Innergy", which has been functioning since 2005 under the direction of Linsey Smith. "Innergy" has earned a large number of first place awards in their respective category, being considered the best small division group in the southern showchoir region. While "Innergy" is the main mixed group, Pisgah also used to have "Sequence" (a girls group) and "Prodigy" (a middle school group). Pisgah also hosts a newly created Drama Club, which was founded in 2022. In the fall of 2023, Pisgah started its first ever band program.

== Academics ==
Pisgah High School operates under the Rankin County School District as previously mentioned. Offering both AP and Dual Credit classes, Pisgah has a fulfilling academic path. Pisgah has also produced two National Merit Finalists in Vanda Spencer (2013) and Tony Holeman (2022).

== Notable sports alumni ==
- Tori Bowie, Olympic Gold Medalist (2016) and Fastest Woman in the World (2017)

- Donatella Luckett, NFL Wide Receiver (Kansas City Chiefs)
