= Pearl Street Historic District (Brandon, Mississippi) =

Historic district in Mississippi, United States

- U.S. National Register of Historic Places
- U.S. Historic district
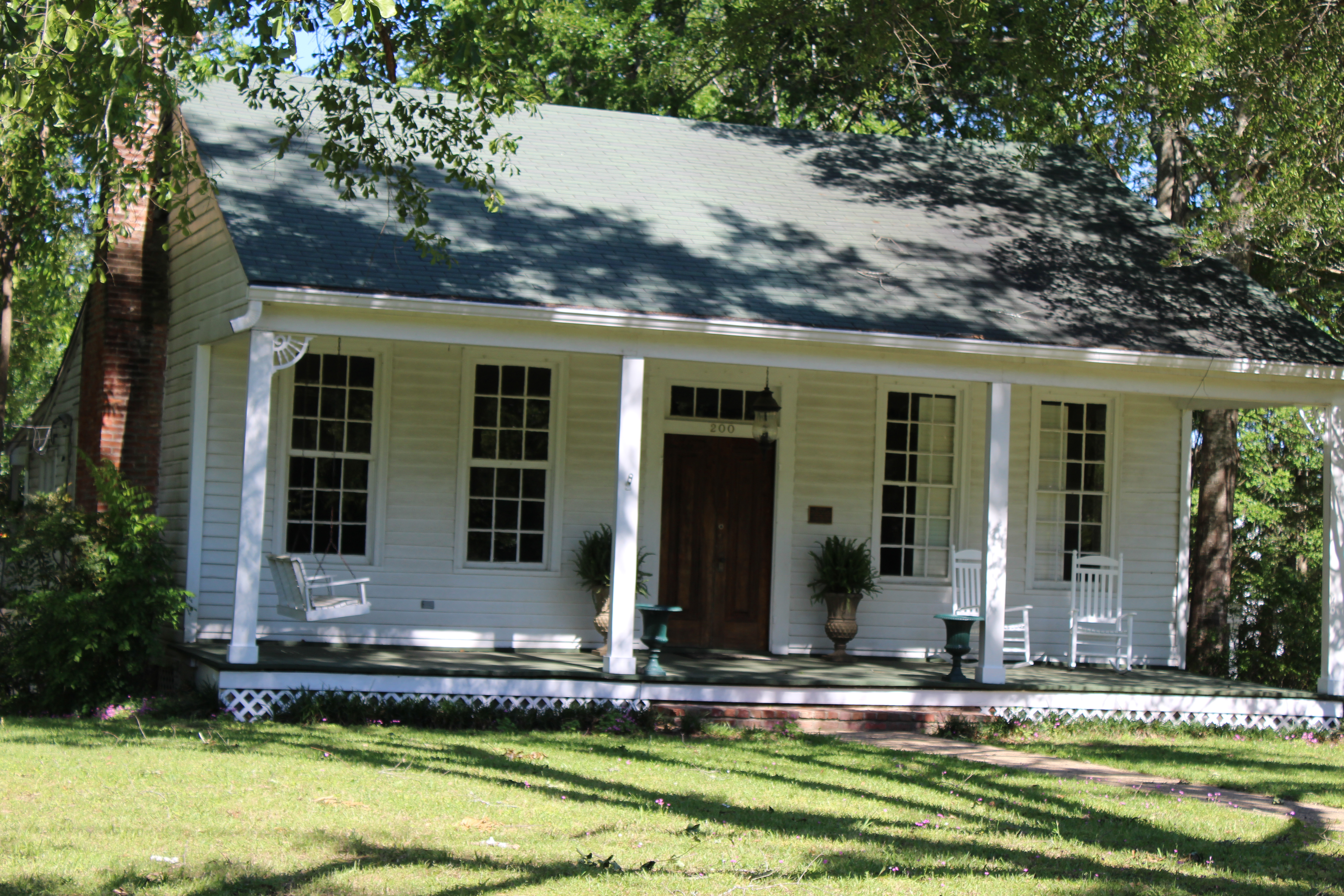

- Location within Mississippi Location within the United States
- Location: 200-204 Pearl St., Brandon, Mississippi
- Coordinates: 32°16′32″N 89°59′26″W
- Area: 4 acres (1.6 ha)
- Architectural style: Greek Revival, Queen Anne
- MPS: Brandon MPS
- NRHP reference No.: 97000798
- Added to NRHP: August 1, 1997

The Pearl Street Historic District is an historic district located in Brandon, Rankin County, Mississippi. The district is listed in the National Register of Historic Places listings in Rankin County, Mississippi.

During the American Civil War, General William Sherman ordered Union troops to burn the city. Most of Brandon was destroyed in the fires but a few homes of the era survived. Some of these homes are located in the Pearl Historic District, next to the Old Brandon Cemetery. Two of the three homes within the historic district were built between 1850 and 1860, while the third was built circa 1920.
