= Rubin Lacey =

American songwriter

Rubin Lacy or Lacey
- Also known as: Rube Lacy or Lacey
- Born: January 2, 1901; Pelahatchie, Mississippi, U.S.
- Died: November 14, 1969 (aged 68) Corcoran, California, U.S.
- Genres: Delta blues
- Occupations: Musician; Preacher
- Instruments: Vocal; Guitar
- Years active: Unknown - 1930 or 1931

Rubin "Rube" Lacy (or Lacey) (January 2, 1901 – November 14, 1969) was an American country blues musician, who played guitar and was a singer and songwriter.

Lacy was born in Pelahatchie, Mississippi, United States, and learned to play the guitar in his teens from an older performer, George Hendrix. Working out of the Jackson area in the Mississippi Delta, he became one of the state's most popular blues singers. His bottleneck style inspired that of the better-known performer Son House. In 1927, he recorded four songs for Columbia Records in Memphis, Tennessee, though none were released, and the masters do not survive.

In 1928, Lacy recorded two songs, "Mississippi Jail House Groan" and "Ham Hound Crave", for Paramount Records, which constitute his recorded legacy. Four years later he became a minister. He was later found living in Lancaster, California, by the blues researcher David Evans, who recorded him with his congregation. He died in Corcoran, California, on November 14, 1969, aged 68.

== Sources ==
- R. Crumb's Heroes of Blues, Jazz and Country, by Robert Crumb, Steven Colt and David A. Jasen. Published by Abrams, 2006, ISBN 978-0810930865
