= Brandon High School (Mississippi) =

Location
- 3090 Highway 18; Brandon, MS 39042; United States of America; 32.2427°N 89.9759°W

Information
- Motto: Developing Our Gifts to Serve by Going the Extra Mile
- School district: Rankin County School District
- Principal: Bryan Marshall
- Staff: 105.00 (FTE)
- Grades: 9-12
- Gender: Co-educational
- Enrollment: 1,645 (2023–2024)
- Student to teacher ratio: 15.67
- Colors: Red, White, Black, and Gray
- Team name: Bulldogs
- Website: Brandon High School

Brandon High School is a suburban public high school located in Brandon, Mississippi, United States. BHS serves grades 9 through 12 and is part of the Rankin County School District, serving students in the Brandon zone.

== Athletics ==
Brandon athletic teams compete in Mississippi High School Athletics Association 7A Region 3.

=== State championships ===
Volleyball

- 2017 Mississippi 6A State Champions
- 2018 Mississippi 6A State Champions

Baseball

- 1967 Mississippi A State Champions
- 2024 Mississippi 7A State Champions

Track and Field

- 2001 Boys Mississippi 5A State Champions
- 2003 Boys Mississippi 5A State Champions
- 2004 Boys Mississippi 5A State Champions
- 2005 Boys Mississippi 5A State Champions
- 2006 Boys Mississippi 5A State Champions
- 2010 Boys Mississippi 5A State Champions
- 2010 Girls Mississippi 5A State Champions

Soccer

- 2001–2002 Boys Mississippi 5A State Champions

== Demographics ==
As of the 2023–24, 824 of Brandon students identified as male, and 821 identified as female. 945 identified as White, 574 identified as Black, 13 identified as Asian, 22 identified as Hispanic, and 91 identified as more than one race.

== Performing arts ==
The school has two competitive show choirs, the mixed-gender "Brio" and the all-female "Bellas". In 2020, Brio won a competition in Madison, Connecticut.

== Notable alumni ==
- Demario Davis, NFL linebacker for the New Orleans Saints
- J. T. Ginn, MLB pitcher, played collegiately at Mississippi State
- Michael Guest, Member of the U.S. House of Representatives from Mississippi's 3rd Congressional District
- Brent Leach, former MLB pitcher
- Jonathan Mingo, Professional Football Player for the Dallas Cowboys
- Gardner Minshew, NFL quarterback for the Arizona Cardinals
- Mary Ann Mobley, American actress, television personality, and first Miss America from Mississippi
- Jerious Norwood, former NFL running back
- Will Rogers, current quarterback of the Washington Huskies.
- Barry Wesson, former MLB outfielder
