= Black Rose Theatre Company =

Mississippi theatre

- Formation: 1991
- Type: Theatre group
- Location: Brandon, Mississippi
- Website: blackrosetheatre.wordpress.com

Black Rose Theatre Company is non-profit community theater located at 103 Black Street in Brandon, Mississippi. The theatre company was founded in 1991 with their first production, The Night of January 16th, by Ayn Rand. In 1992 Black Rose moved into its present home and premiered with a production of The Fantastiks.

Since 1992, Black Rose has purchased the theatre it occupies on Black Street and received a 501(c)(3) designation. Each year the company has a season of about five productions.
