= Tori Bowie =

American sprinter and long jumper (1990–2023)

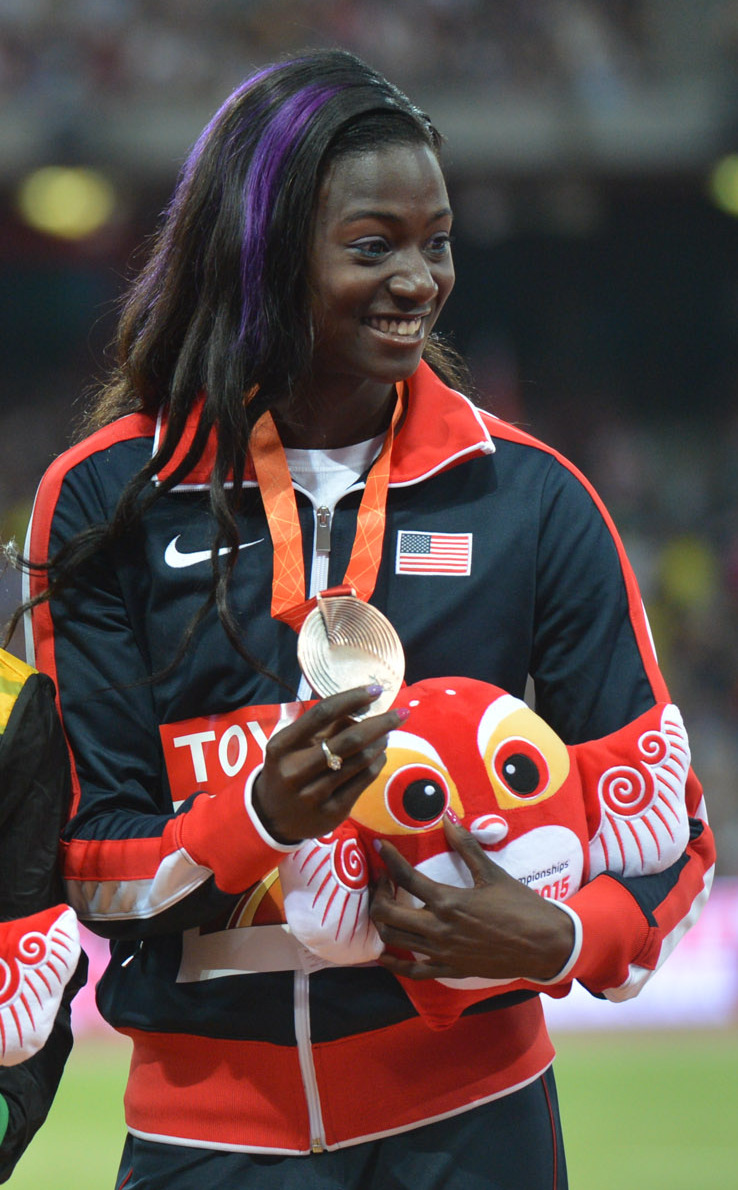
- Bowie at the 2015 World Championships in Beijing

Personal information
- Full name: Frentorish Bowie
- Born: August 27, 1990 Sand Hill, Rankin County, Mississippi, U.S.
- Died: April 23, 2023 (aged 32) Horizon West, Florida, U.S.
- Height: 5 ft 9 in (175 cm)
- Weight: 128 lb (58 kg)

Sport
- Country: United States
- Sport: Track and field
- Events: 100 meters, 200 meters, long jump
- Coached by: Lance Brauman

Achievements and titles
- Personal bests: 100 m: 10.78 s (Eugene 2016); 200 m: 21.77 s (Eugene 2017); Long jump: 6.95 mi (Naperville 2014)
Medal record
Women's athletics
Representing the United States
Olympic Games
Gold medal – first place	2016 Rio de Janeiro	4 × 100 m relay
Silver medal – second place	2016 Rio de Janeiro	100 m
Bronze medal – third place	2016 Rio de Janeiro	200 m
World Championships
Gold medal – first place	2017 London	100 m
Gold medal – first place	2017 London	4 × 100 m relay
Bronze medal – third place	2015 Beijing	100 m

Frentorish "Tori" Bowie (August 27, 1990 – April 23, 2023) was an American track and field athlete, who primarily competed in the long jump, 100 meters, and 200 meters. She won the silver medal in the 100 m and bronze in the 200 m at the 2016 Rio Olympics, bronze and gold in the 100 m at the 2015 and 2017 World Championships, respectively, and also earned gold medals as part of U.S. women's 4 × 100 m relays at both the 2016 Olympic Games and 2017 World Championships.

Bowie competed collegiately for the University of Southern Mississippi and was a two-time NCAA Division I long jump champion, winning indoors and outdoors in 2011. After the 2014 World Indoor Championships, where she made her international debut competing in the long jump, she switched her focus to the sprints. She took eight elite Diamond League sprint victories.

Bowie died in 2023 from complications of childbirth.

== Early life and education ==
Bowie was born on August 27, 1990, in Sand Hill, Rankin County, Mississippi. When she was two years old, her mother placed Bowie and her sister into foster care. Her grandmother gained guardianship over her, becoming caretaker, instilling in Bowie a work ethic about which she recounted, "My grandmother's number-one rule was that once you start something, you don't quit...She never let me give up on anything." She attended Pisgah High School where she competed in basketball and track and field. As a junior in 2007, Bowie won Mississippi state high school championships in the 100 m and the long jump; as a senior in 2008, she won state championships in the 100 m, 200 m, and long jump. She also won three state titles in the 4 × 100 m relay, as well as competing on the state team in women's basketball.

Bowie gained an athletic scholarship to attend the University of Southern Mississippi, doing an interdisciplinary degree in psychology and social work. She represented the Southern Miss Golden Eagles and Lady Eagles in NCAA Division I competitions. Doing both sprints and jumps, she had her best results in the long jump during her freshman year, coming third at the Conference USA indoors, second at the Conference USA outdoors and reaching the NCAA Women's Outdoor Track and Field Championship, where she jumped in qualifying only. In her second year of collegiate competition, she set her indoor best of 6.23 m (20 ft 5 1/4 in) in the long jump and was the Conference USA indoor runner-up. At the outdoor Conference USA meet, she came third in the long jump and also made the 100 m final. She finished sixth in the long jump at the NCAA outdoor championship with a mark of 6.26 m (20 ft 6 1/4 in) in that meet. She also jumped nationally at the 2010 USA Outdoor Track and Field Championships, claiming eighth place overall.

During her junior year in 2011, Bowie won both of her two collegiate national titles. She won the long jump at the Conference USA indoor championship, where she was also runner-up in the triple jump. A jump of 6.52 m (21 ft 4 1/2 in) was enough to win Bowie her first college title in the long jump at the NCAA Division I Women's Indoor Track and Field Championships, also setting a school record. She was second in both horizontal jumps at the Conference USA Outdoors, then won the NCAA outdoor long jump title with another school record mark of 6.64 m (21 ft 9 1/4 in). For her achievements she was named the conference female athlete of the year.

In her final year of college at the University of Southern Mississippi, she began with a triple jump win at the Conference USA indoor championships with a mark of 13.09 m (42 ft 11 1/4 in), a personal record for the event. She also took second place in the long jump. Bowie competed in both jumps at the NCAA indoor championship, but was out of the top eight in both events. Outdoors, she significantly improved her 100 m best that year, dropping from 11.76 to 11.28 seconds. At the Conference USA outdoor championship meet, she finished first in the long jump with a new school record of 6.78 m (22 ft 2 3/4 in), as well as third in the 100 m, fifth in the triple jump, and her team finished seventh in the 4 × 100 m relay. In her last major outing for Southern Miss she tried to repeat her NCAA outdoor title in the long jump, but finished second to Texas Christian University's Whitney Gipson. Bowie earned her degree in interdisciplinary studies from the University of Southern Mississippi in 2012.

== Professional career ==
Bowie began competing in track and field professionally in 2013. At the USATF Championships that year, she was a 100 m semi-finalist and narrowly missed the long jump team for the Moscow World Championships after finishing fourth in that event. She also competed on the Diamond League circuit for the first time, long jumping at the Adidas Grand Prix and Herculis meets.

Bowie continued to improve at the start of 2014. She jumped 6.95 m (22 ft 9 1/2 in) in Naperville, Illinois, won the long jump at the New Balance Indoor Grand Prix in Boston and set an indoor best of 7.14 seconds in the 60 m dash for second at the Millrose Games in New York. Her runner-up finish in the long jump at the USATF Indoor Championships gained Bowie a spot on team for the World Indoor Championships in Sopot, Poland. She faltered in the qualifying and was eliminated, coming 14th overall.

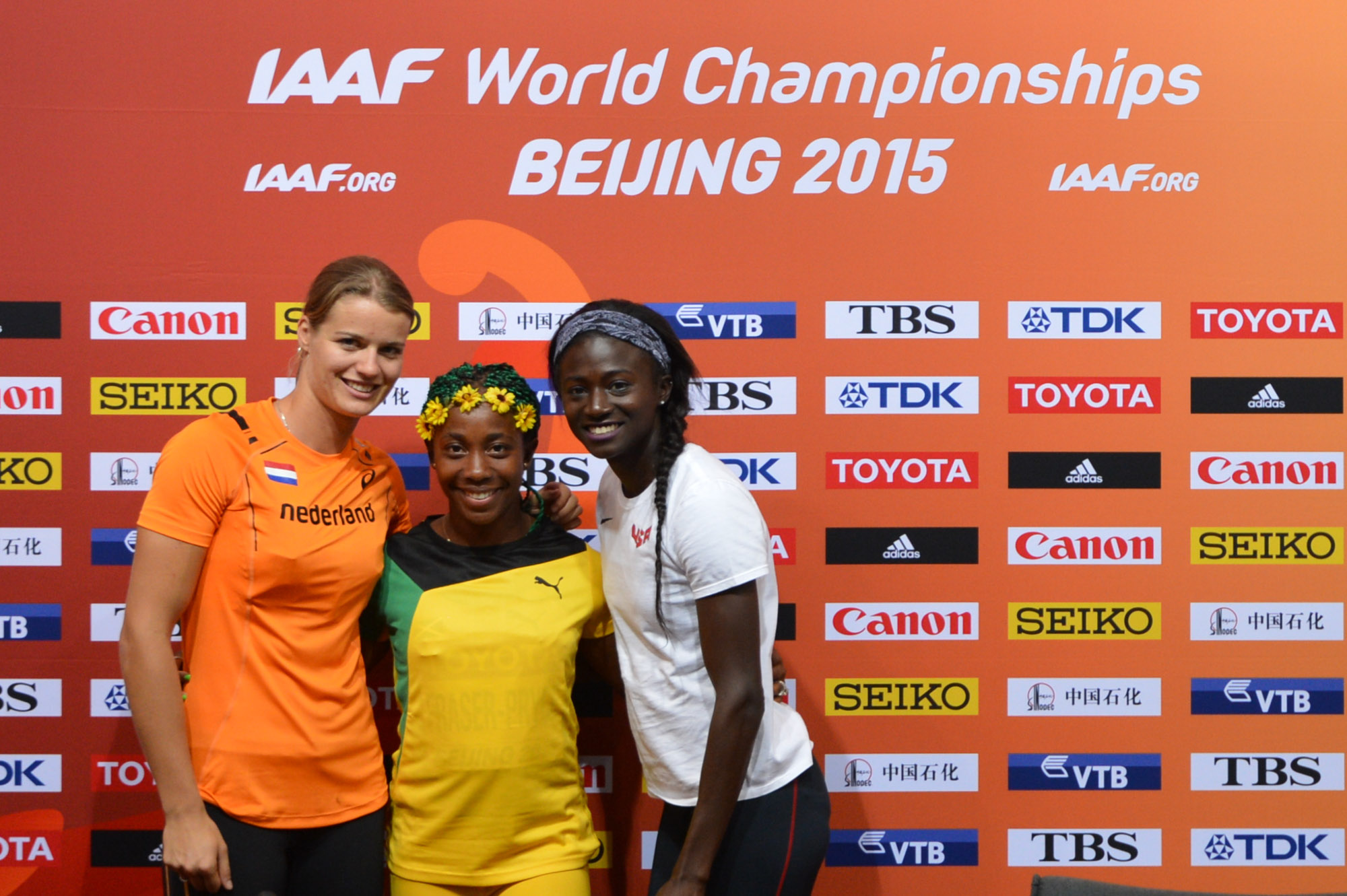
Bowie (R) finished third in the 100 m behind only Shelly-Ann Fraser-Pryce and Dafne Schippers (L) at Beijing 2015.

In May 2014, she won her first Diamond League race with a 200 m victory at the Prefontaine Classic in Eugene, Oregon. To everyone's surprise, she outsprinted Blessing Okagbare and the renowned Allyson Felix with a time of 22.18 s. Bowie then claimed wins in the 100 m races at the Rome, New York and Monaco Diamond League meets, clocking a swift 10.80 seconds at the latter.

Bowie won the 100 m with a time of 10.81 s at the 2015 USATF Championships (windy 10.72 s in the semifinals) to earn a spot for the Beijing World Championships in Athletics, where she went on to take the bronze medal in a time of 10.86 s.

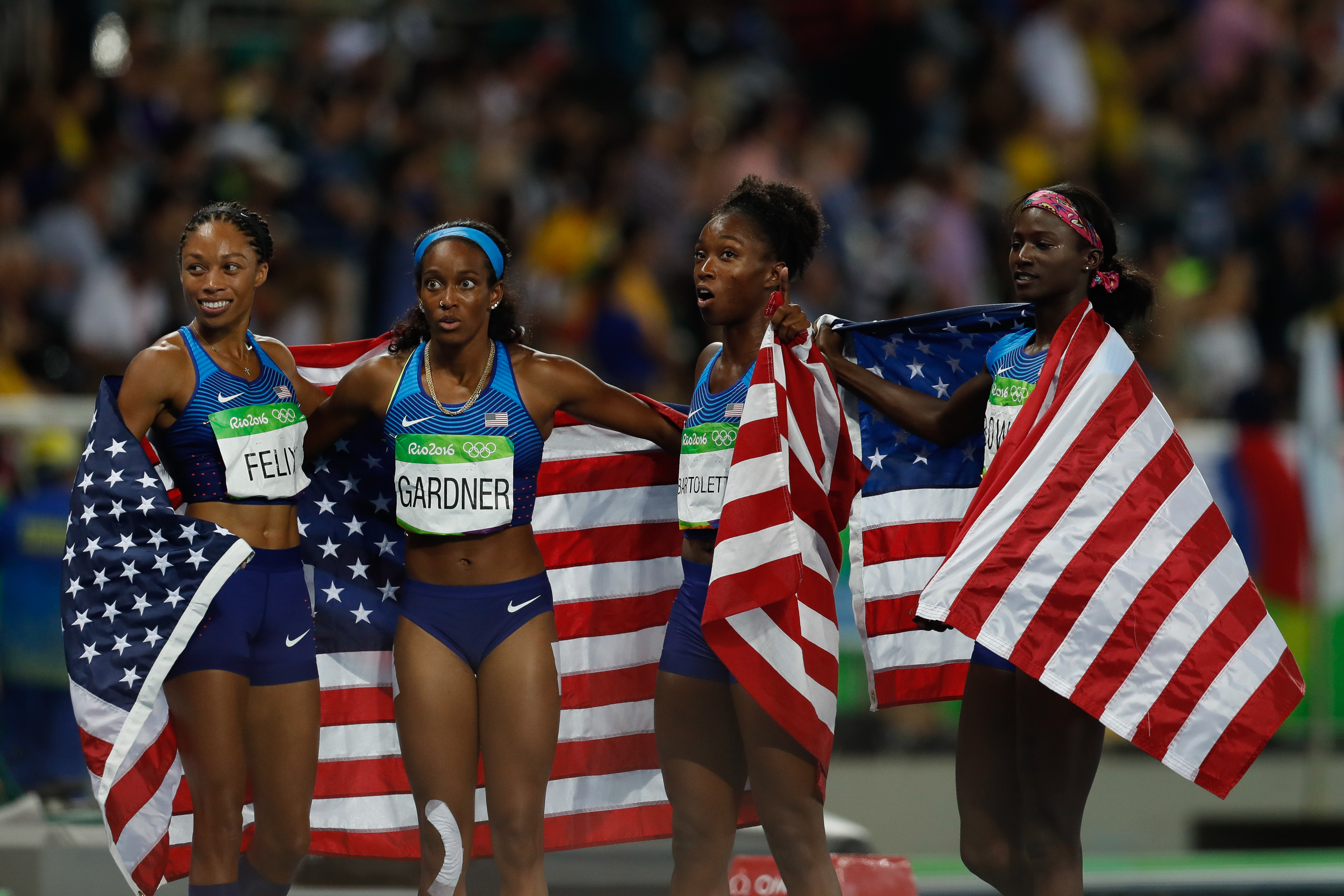
Allyson Felix, English Gardner, Tianna Bartoletta, and Tori Bowie celebrate their victory in the women's 4 × 100 m relay at the 2016 Rio Olympics.

The following year, at the 2016 U.S. Olympic Trials, she placed third in the 100 m with a time of 10.78 seconds. At the 2016 Summer Olympics in Rio de Janeiro, Bowie won the silver medal in the 100 m event with a time of 10.83 s. She then earned bronze in the 200 m, clocking 22.15 s. She added the gold medal while anchoring the women's 4 × 100 m relay team.

At the 2017 World Athletics Championships in London, Bowie won the gold medal in the 100-meter dash, achieving a time of 10.85 seconds, with a .01 second margin of victory.

In April 2019 at the Robison Invitational in Provo, Utah, Bowie jumped the entry standard for the Doha World Championships in Qatar with a leap of 6.78 m (22 ft 2 3/4 in). She finished fourth in Doha, jumping 6.81 m (22 ft 4 in) in the final.

== Death ==
On May 2, 2023, after Bowie had not been seen or heard from for several days, authorities performed a wellness check at her home in Orange County, Florida, where she was found dead. She was 32 years old, and had been eight months pregnant. Her obituary gave her date of death as April 23, 2023. According to the results of an autopsy, Bowie died as a result of complications related to childbirth, among which were eclampsia, respiratory distress and high blood pressure. Her daughter was stillborn. The weight of her body upon discovery was only 96 pounds (44 kg), 32 pounds (15 kg) below her weight in competition. Toxicology reports were negative.

== Achievements ==
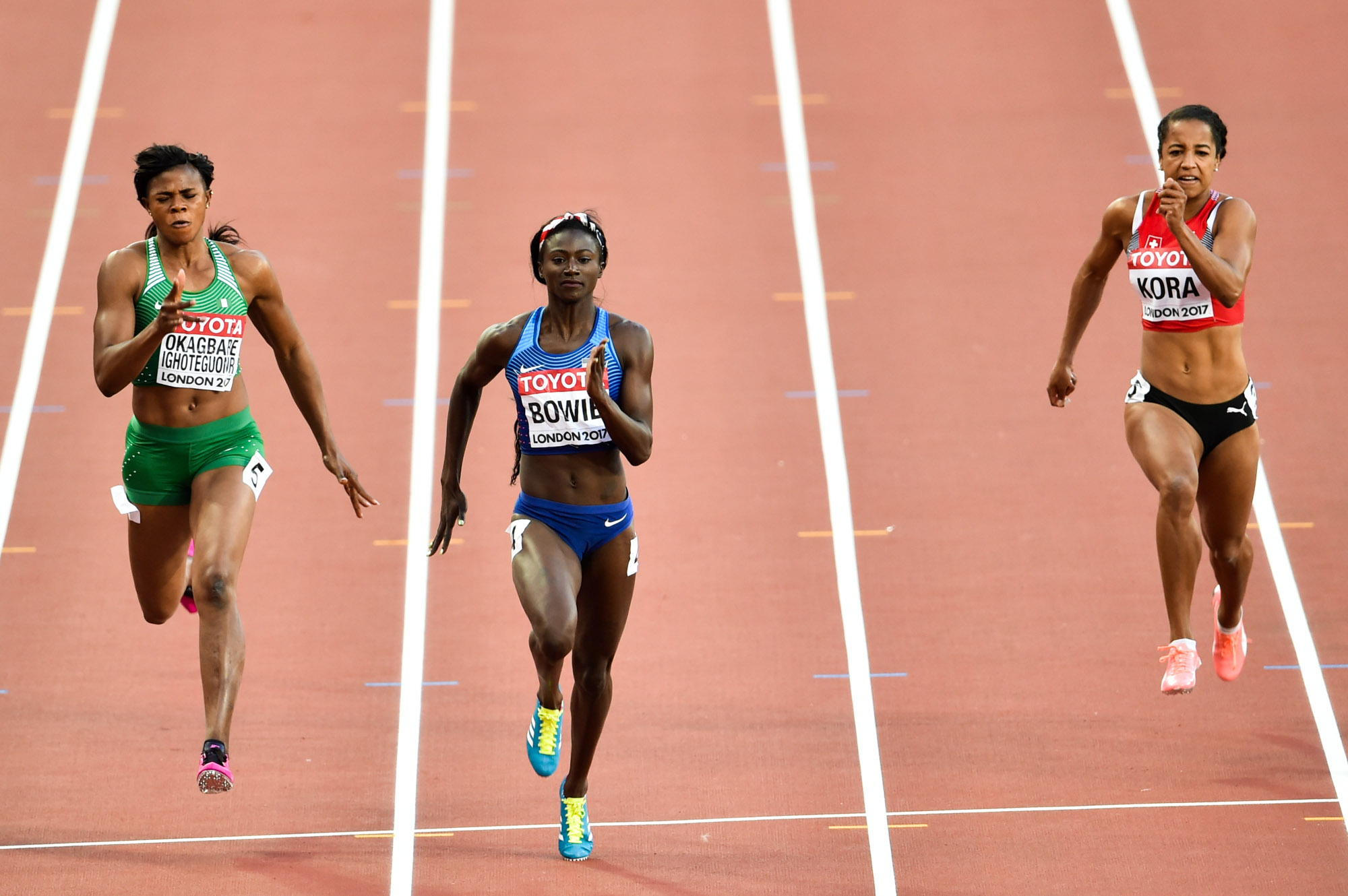
Bowie (C) races in the 100 m semifinal at the 2017 London World Championships, where she then took the gold medal in the final.

All information taken from World Athletics profile.

=== International competitions ===
Representing the United States
Year	Competition	Venue	Position	Event	Time
2014	World Indoor Championships	Sopot, Poland	13th (q)	Long jump	6.12 m (20 ft 3/4 in)
2015	World Championships	Beijing, China	3rd	100 m	10.86
2016	Olympic Games	Rio de Janeiro, Brazil	2nd	100 m	10.83
2016	Olympic Games	Rio de Janeiro, Brazil	3rd	200 m	22.15
2016	Olympic Games	Rio de Janeiro, Brazil	1st	4 × 100 m relay	41.01
2017	World Championships	London, United Kingdom	1st	100 m	10.85
2017	World Championships	London, United Kingdom	1st	4 × 100 m relay	41.82
2019	World Championships	Doha, Qatar	22nd (h)	100 m	11.30^{1}
2019	World Championships	Doha, Qatar	4th	Long jump	6.81 m

^{1}Did not start in the semifinals.

=== Personal bests ===
- 60 meters indoor – 7.11 (Portland, OR 2016)

- 100 meters – 10.78 (+1.0 m/s, Eugene, OR 2016)
- 200 meters – 21.77 (+1.5 m/s, Eugene, OR 2017)
- Long jump – 6.91 m (22 ft 8 in) (+1.0 m/s, Los Angeles, CA 2013)
  - Long jump indoor – 6.95 m (22 ft 9 1/2 in) (Naperville, IL 2014)
- Triple jump – 12.65 m (41 ft 6 in) (0.0 m/s, New Orleans, LA 2012)
  - Triple jump indoor – 13.09 m (42 ft 11 1/4 in) (Birmingham, AL 2012)

=== Circuit wins ===
- Diamond League
  - 2014: Eugene Prefontaine Classic (200 m), Rome Golden Gala (100 m), New York Grand Prix (100 m), Monaco Herculis (100 m)
  - 2015: New York (200 m)
  - 2016: Doha Qatar Athletic Super Grand Prix (100 m), Eugene (200 m)
  - 2017: Eugene (200 m)

=== National and NCAA titles ===
- USA Outdoor Track and Field Championships
  - 100 metres: 2015, 2017
  - 200 metres: 2016
- NCAA Division I Women's Outdoor Track and Field Championships
  - Long jump: 2011
- NCAA Division I Women's Indoor Track and Field Championships
  - Long jump: 2011
