= Jonathan Mingo =

American football player (born 2001)

No. 18 – Dallas Cowboys
- Position: Wide receiver
- Roster status: Active

Personal information
- Born: April 20, 2001 (age 25); Brandon, Mississippi, U.S.
- Listed height: 6 ft 2 in (1.88 m)
- Listed weight: 225 lb (102 kg)

Career information
- High school: Brandon (MS)
- College: Ole Miss (2019–2022)
- NFL draft: 2023: 2nd round, 39th overall pick

Career history
- Carolina Panthers (2023–2024); Dallas Cowboys (2024–present)

Awards and highlights
- Second-team All-SEC (2022)

Career NFL statistics as of Week 5, 2026
- Receptions: 64
- Receiving yards: 640
- Stats at Pro Football Reference

Jonathan Ondreal Mingo (born April 20, 2001) is an American professional football wide receiver for the Dallas Cowboys of the National Football League (NFL). He played college football for the Ole Miss Rebels and was drafted by the Carolina Panthers in the second round of the 2023 NFL draft.

== Early life ==
Mingo grew up in Brandon, Mississippi, and attended Brandon High School. Mingo was rated a four-star recruit and committed to play college football at Ole Miss over offers from Georgia, Auburn, and Mississippi State.

== College career ==
Mingo started all 12 of Ole Miss's games as a freshman and finished the season with 12 receptions for 172 yards and one touchdown. He caught 27 passes for 379 yards and three touchdowns during his sophomore season. Mingo missed seven games due to a foot injury in his junior season and finished the year with 22 receptions for 346 yards with three touchdowns. In 2022, Mingo started all 13 games, tying for the team lead with five receiving touchdowns (51-861-16.9). He set a Ole Miss record for most receiving yards in a game with 247 against Vanderbilt.

== Professional career ==
=== Pre-draft ===
Pre-draft measurables
Height	Weight	Arm length	Hand span	Wingspan	40-yard dash	10-yard split	20-yard split	20-yard shuttle	Three-cone drill	Vertical jump	Broad jump	Bench press
6 ft 1 3/4 in (1.87 m)	220 lb (100 kg)	32 1/8 in (0.82 m)	10 3/8 in (0.26 m)	6 ft 3 3/4 in (1.92 m)	4.46 s	1.54 s	2.56 s	4.25 s	7.04 s	39.5 in (1.00 m)	10 ft 9 in (3.28 m)	22 reps
All values from NFL Combine/Pro Day

=== Carolina Panthers ===
Mingo was selected by the Carolina Panthers in the second round with the 39th overall pick in the 2023 NFL draft. He entered the season as a starting wide receiver alongside veteran Adam Thielen. He finished his rookie season with 43 catches for 418 yards and no touchdowns through 15 games and 14 starts.

In 2024, the Panthers hired new head coach Dave Canales to rebuild the team. Once the season started, despite Thielen missing multiple weeks with a hamstring injury and Diontae Johnson being traded on October 29, Mingo was still passed on the depth chart by first-round pick Xavier Legette, undrafted free agent Jalen Coker and veteran David Moore. He only had one catch for one yard from Week 6 to Week 9. He appeared in 9 games (5 starts), collecting 12 receptions for 121 yards.

=== Dallas Cowboys ===
On November 5, 2024, Mingo and a 2025 seventh-round draft pick (#247-Tommy Akingbesote) were traded to the Dallas Cowboys in exchange for a 2025 fourth-round pick (#114-Trevor Etienne). Although he appeared in 8 games with one start, he didn't seem able to adapt to the team's offense. He registered 5 receptions for 46 yards. He was declared inactive in one game.

In 2025, the Cowboys promoted Brian Schottenheimer to head coach. On August 18, it was announced that Mingo would begin the season on injured reserve due to a PCL sprain in his right knee. He was activated on October 21, ahead of the team's Week 8 matchup against the Denver Broncos. His impact was minimal, appearing in six games and making just one catch of 25 yards. He was declared inactive in 3 games.

== NFL career statistics ==
Legend
**Bold**	Career high

=== Regular season ===
Year	Team	Games		Receiving					Rushing					Fumbles	
Year	Team	GP	GS	Rec	Yds	Avg	Lng	TD	Att	Yds	Avg	Lng	TD	Fum	Lost
2023	CAR	**15**	**14**	**43**	**418**	9.7	**40**	0	0	0	0	0	0	**1**	**0**
2024	CAR	9	5	12	121	10.1	35	0	**2**	**5**	**2.5**	**3**	0	**1**	**1**
2024	DAL	8	1	5	46	9.2	0	0	0	0	0	0	0	0	0
2025	DAL	6	0	1	25	**25.0**	25	0	0	0	0	0	0	0	0
2026	DAL	5	0	3	30	10.0	12	0	0	0	0	0	0	0	0
Career		43	20	64	640	10.0	40	0	2	5	2.5	3	0	2	1
