= Findlay Market =

- Findlay Market Building
- U.S. National Register of Historic Places
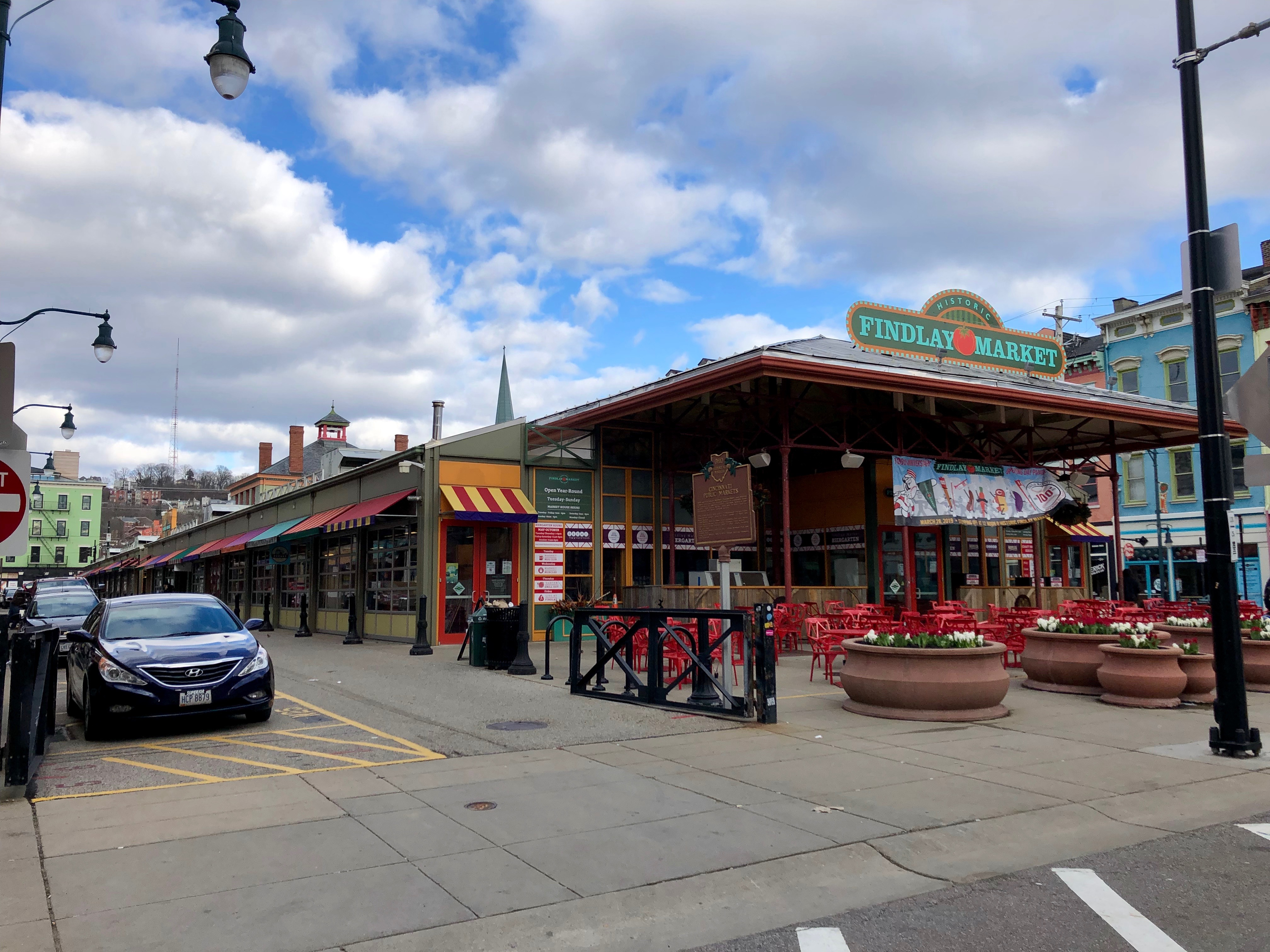
- Findlay Market, from Elm Street

- Location within Ohio Location within the United States
- Location: Esplanade at Elder St., between Elm and Race Sts., Cincinnati, Ohio
- Coordinates: 39°6′55″N 84°31′9″W
- Built: 1852
- Architect: Williams, Adams & Co.
- Architectural style: Italianate
- Visitation: 1.2 million (2018)
- NRHP reference No.: 72001020
- Added to NRHP: June 5, 1972

Findlay Market is a historic public market in Cincinnati, Ohio. It is the state's oldest continuously operated public market. The building was listed on the National Register of Historic Places on June 5, 1972. The market is the last remaining of the nine that once served Cincinnati.

== History ==
Findlay Market was founded in 1852, on land donated by the estate of General James Findlay and his wife Jane Irwin Findlay. Built with the new iron framework technology, this was one of the earliest structures in the nation in which that technique was used, and one of the few remaining. The market bell from Pearl Street Market, Cincinnati's first market house, now hangs in Findlay Market's bell tower.

The market is located north of downtown Cincinnati in Over-the-Rhine, an historic neighborhood known for its dense concentration of Italianate architecture. Open year-round, Tuesday through Sunday, Findlay Market has more than about three dozen indoor merchants selling meat, fish, poultry, produce, flowers, cheese, deli, and ethnic foods.

On Saturdays and Sundays from March to December, the Market hosts a farmers' market and other outdoor vendors, street performers, and special events. The Findlay Market Opening Day Parade for the Cincinnati Reds is an annual Cincinnati tradition.

In 2019 Newsweek named Findlay Market one of the top ten public markets in the world.

== Market District Development ==
The Findlay Market district is a center of economic activity in Over-the-Rhine. Cincinnati City Council named The Corporation for Findlay Market its Preferred Developer for 39 city-owned properties near the market in June 2006.

In 2010, the market became 100% occupied and continues to grow. In 2004, the City of Cincinnati completed a $16 million renovation of the market.

== In popular culture ==
Johnny Cash visits Findlay Market in a scene of the movie The Pride of Jesse Hallam. Findlay Market is mentioned in "Oh, Cincinnati," a song by the local band The Seedy Seeds.

== Gallery ==
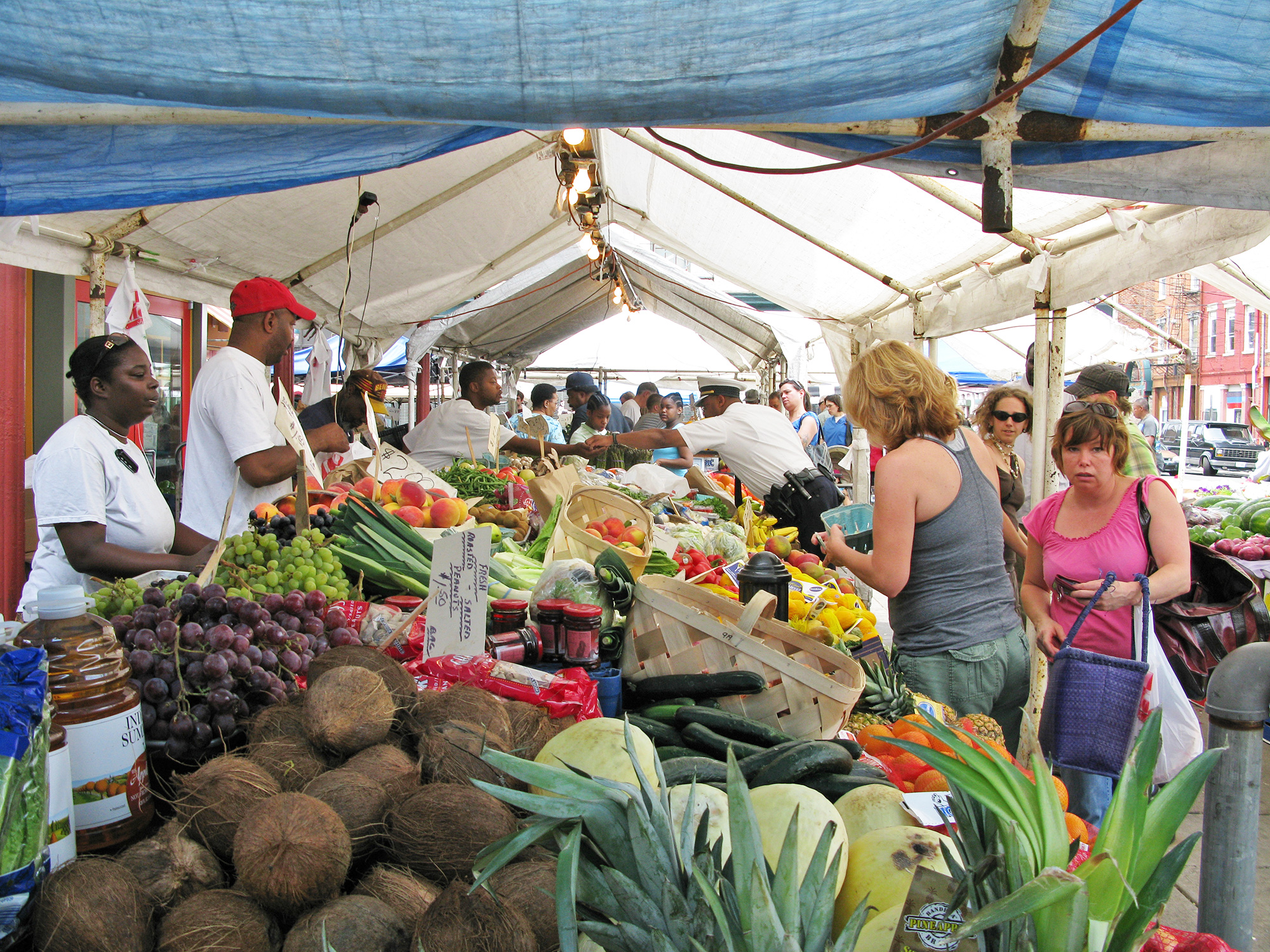
A variety of produce is sold at Findlay Market.

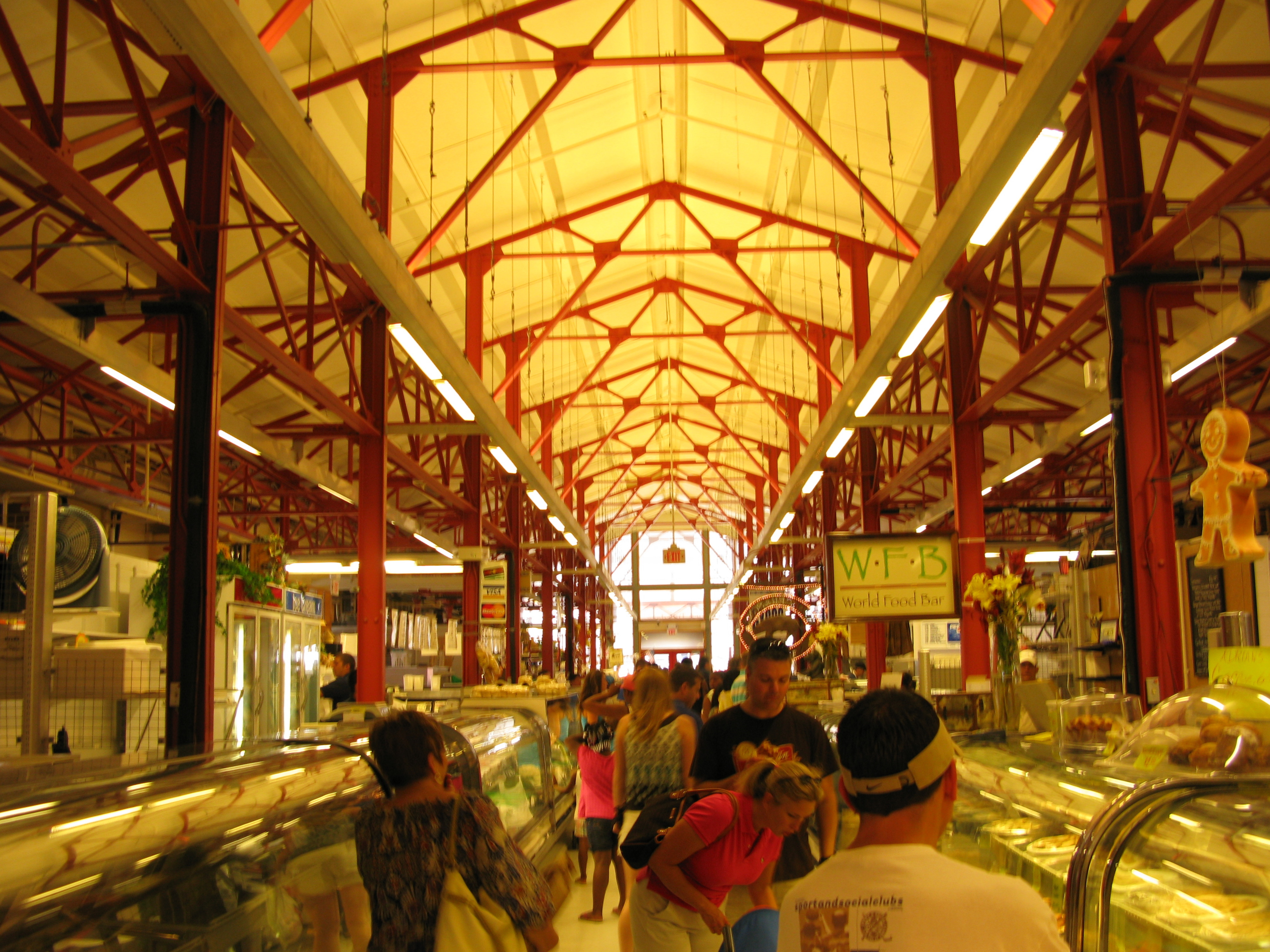
Meats, delicatessens, and other prepared food stands are inside the market.

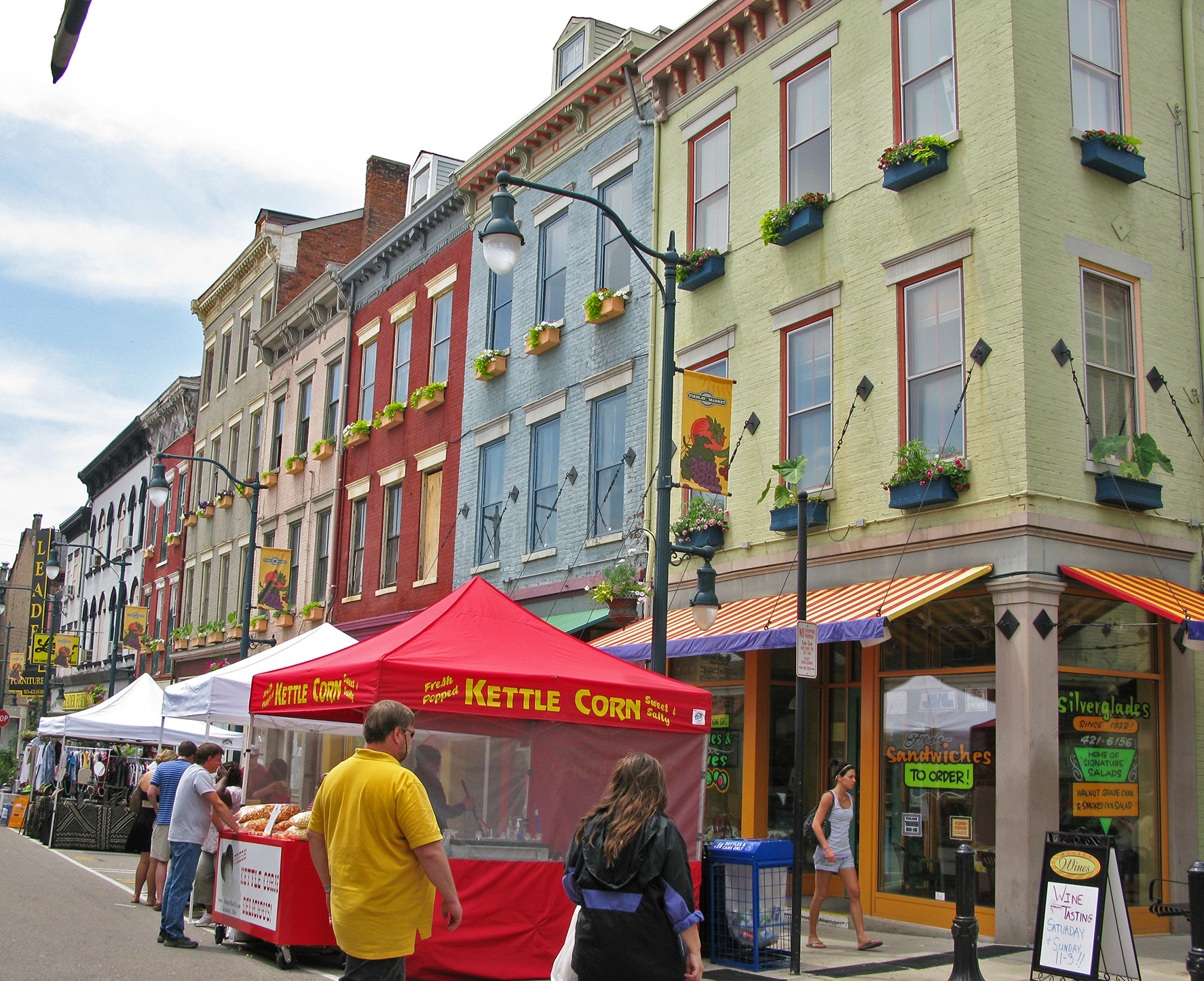
The market is surrounded by many small, independently owned shops and stands.

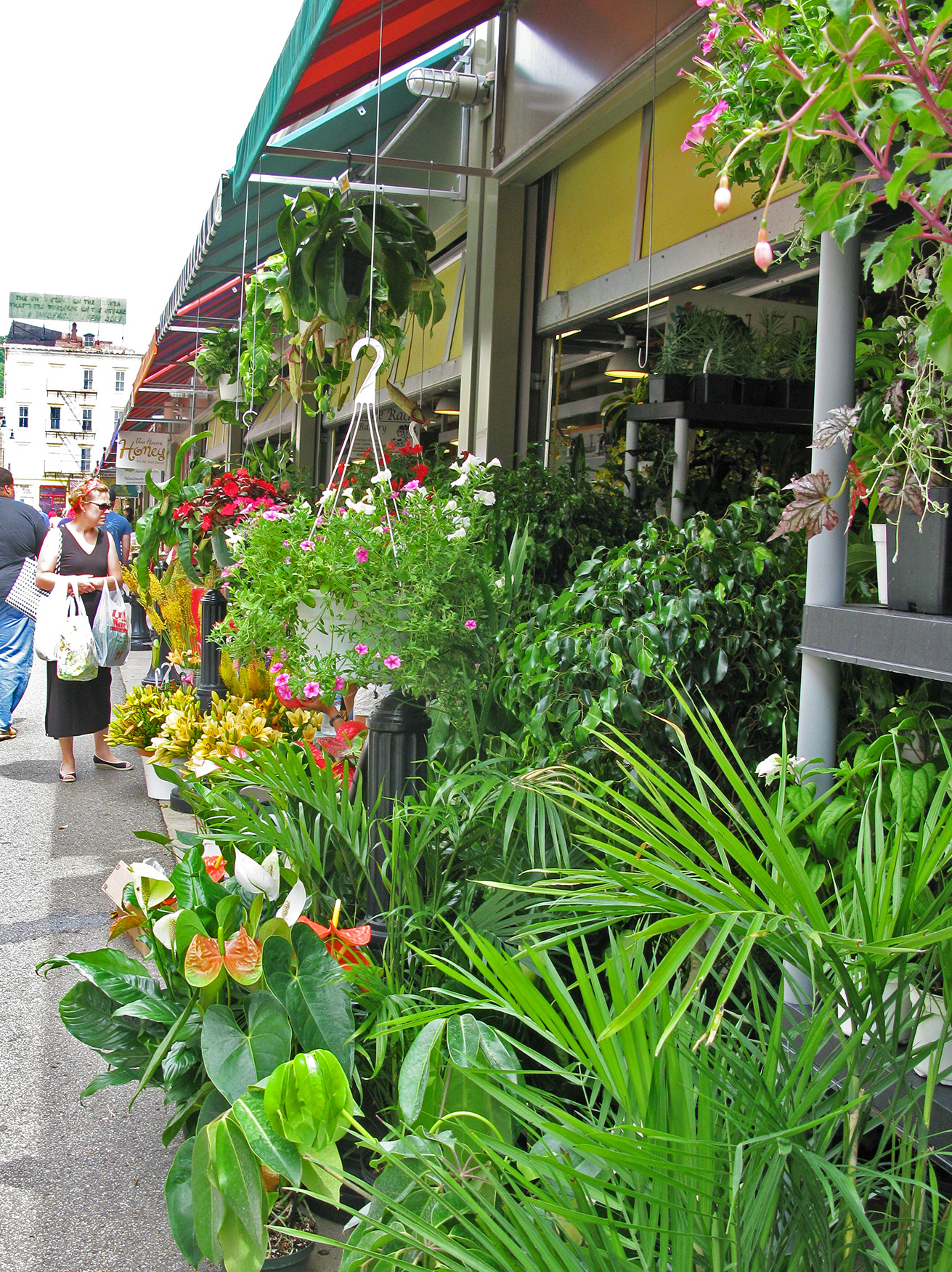
Some stands sell herbs, flowers, and various decorative plants.

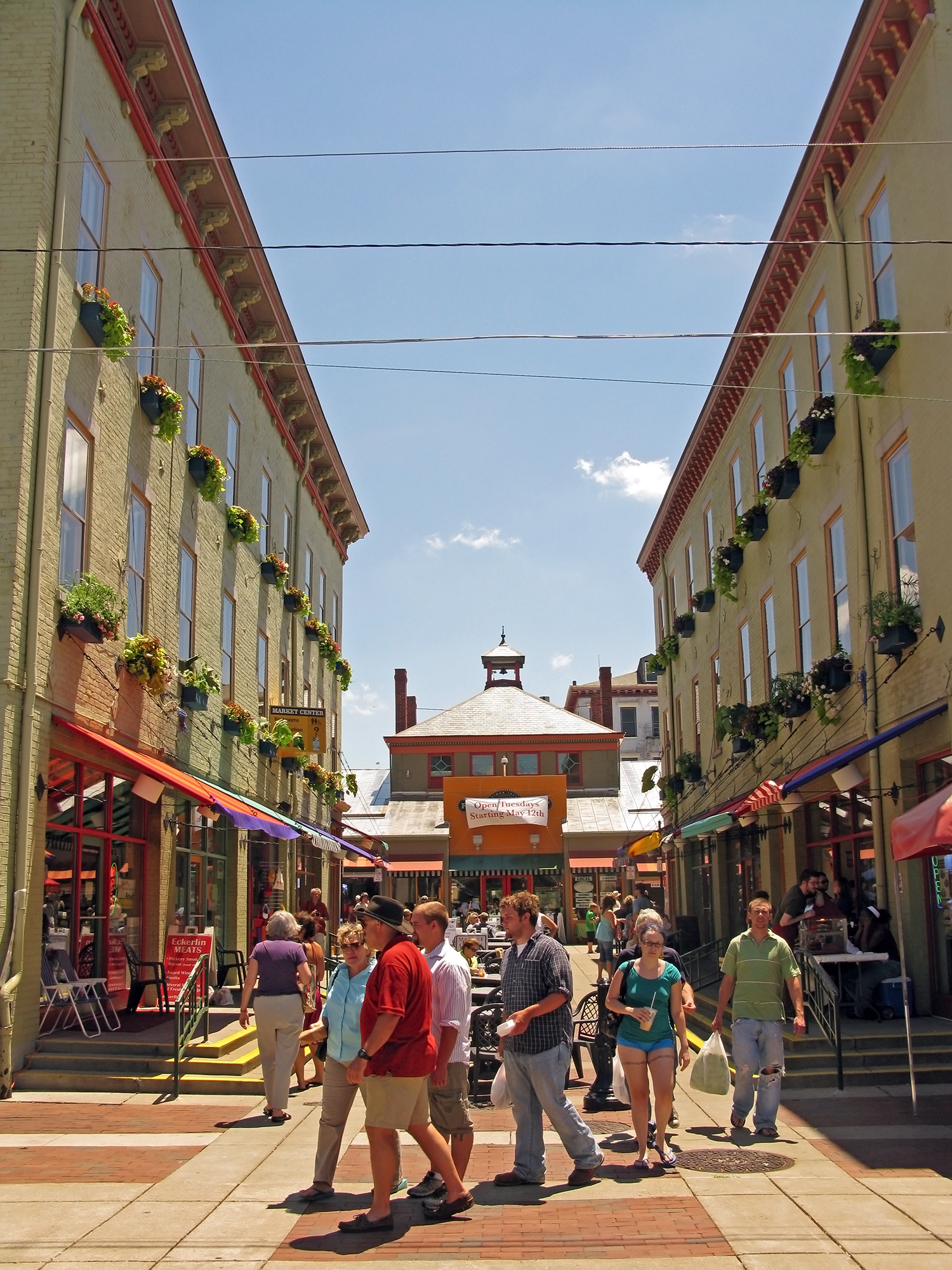
North Entrance

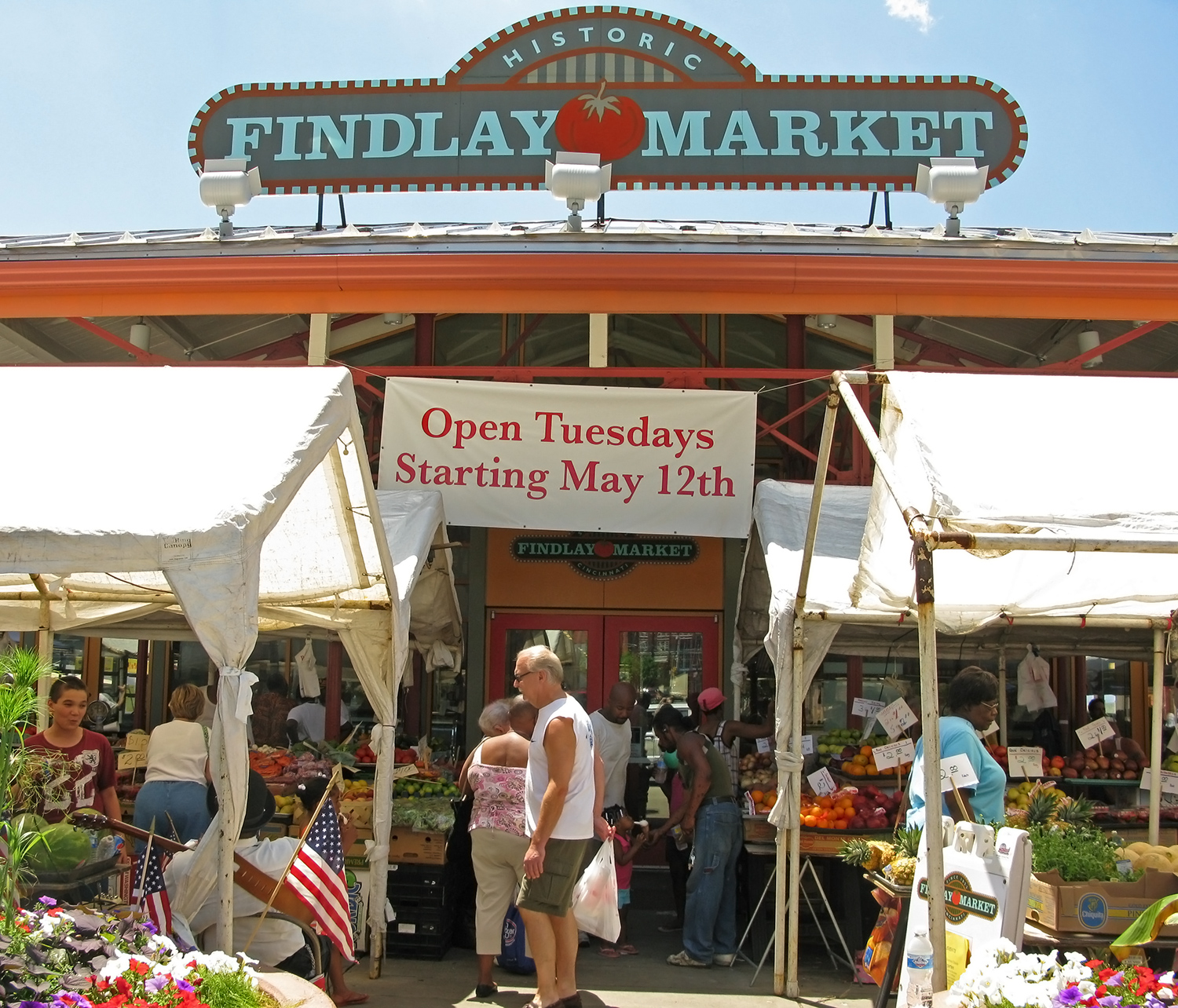
East Entrance

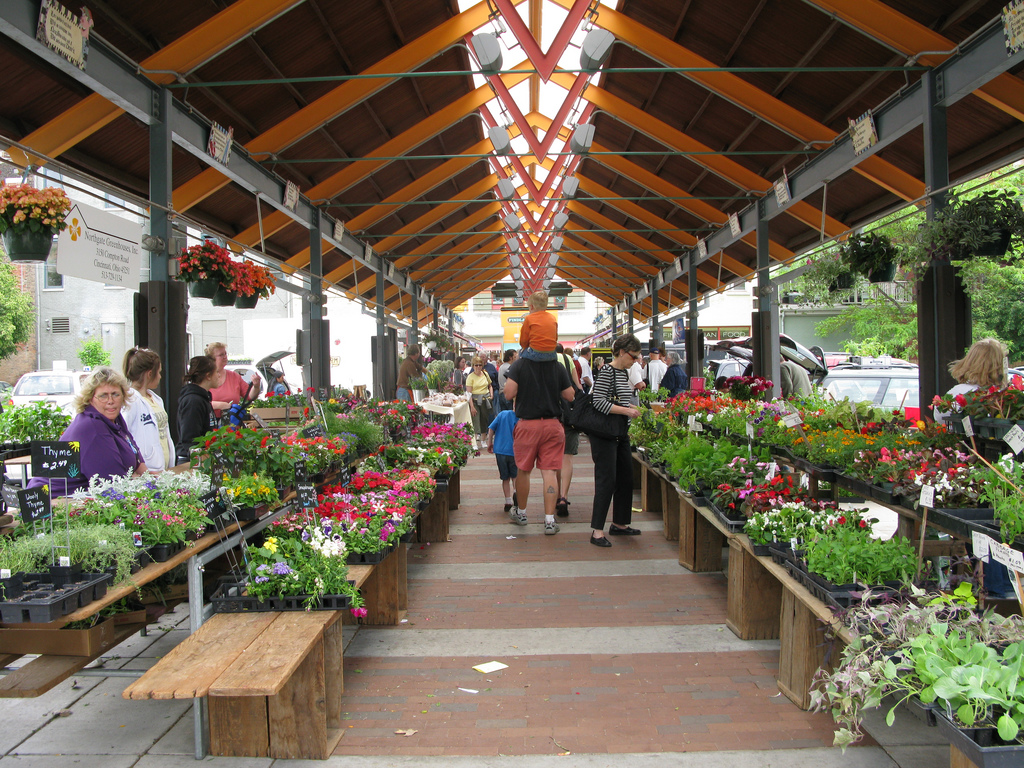
Farmer's Market

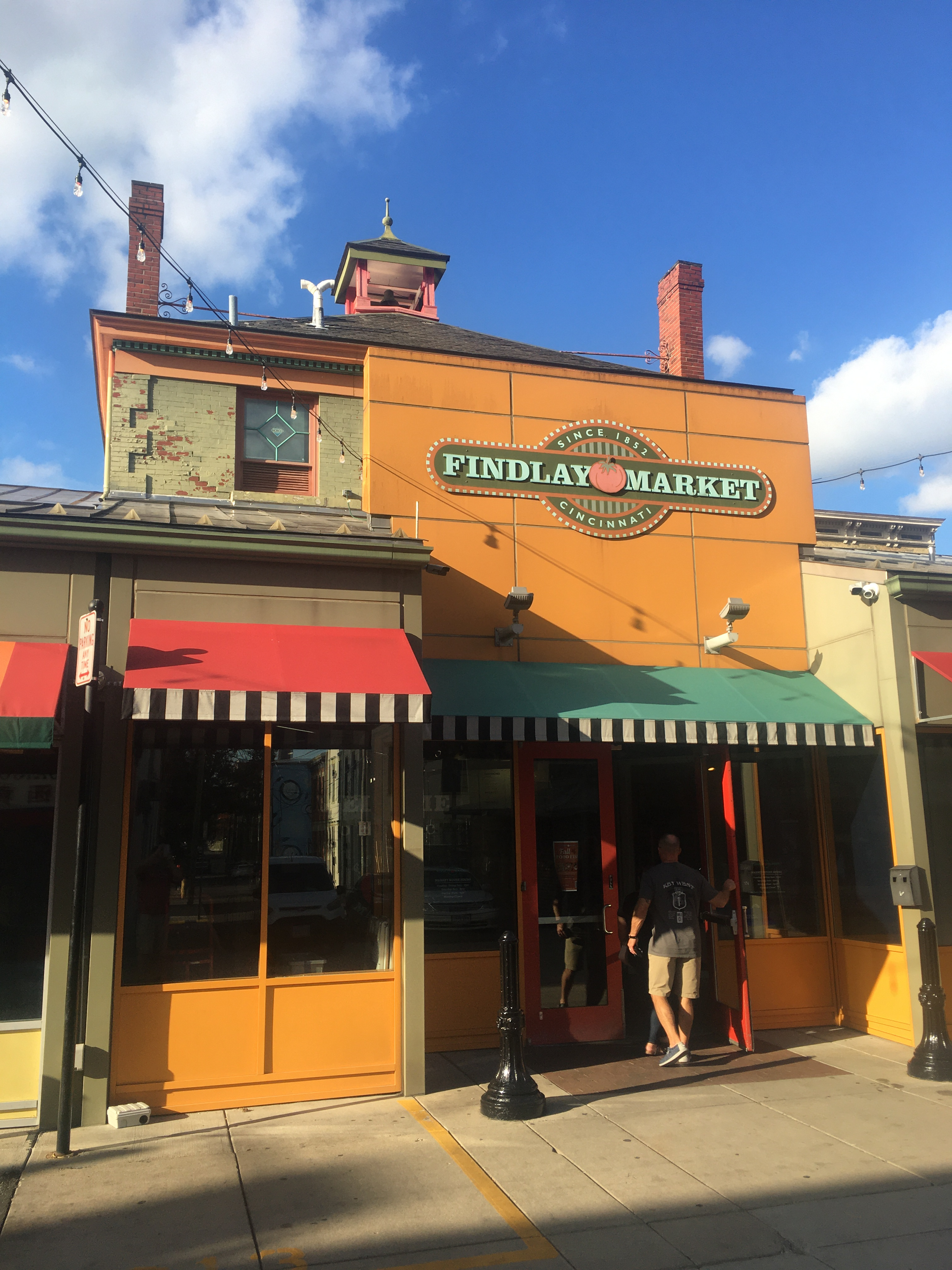
The entrance into the market
