= Stevens-Buchanan House =

Historic house in Mississippi, United States

- U.S. National Register of Historic Places
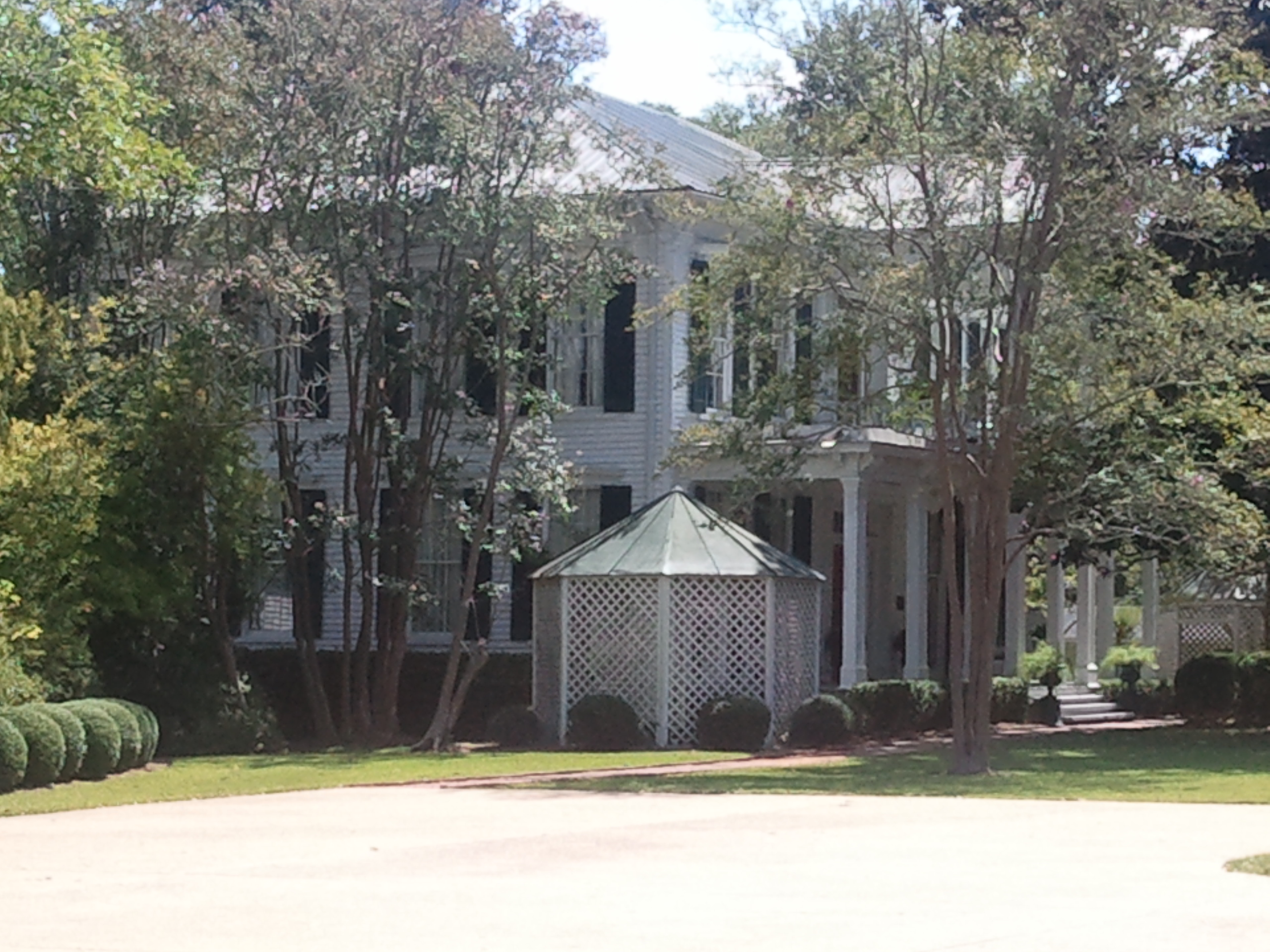
- Location: 505 College Street, Brandon, Mississippi
- Coordinates: 32°16′07″N 89°59′20″W
- Area: 8.6 acres (3.5 ha)
- Built: 1869
- Architectural style: Greek Revival, Italianate
- NRHP reference No.: 78001628
- Added to NRHP: May 5, 1978

The Stevens-Buchanan House is a historic mansion in Brandon, Mississippi, United States. It was built in 1868 for James Richardson Stevens and his wife, Martha L. Patton. It was designed in the Greek Revival and Italianate architectural styles. It has been listed on the National Register of Historic Places since May 5, 1978.
