= Pearl Street School =

- U.S. National Register of Historic Places
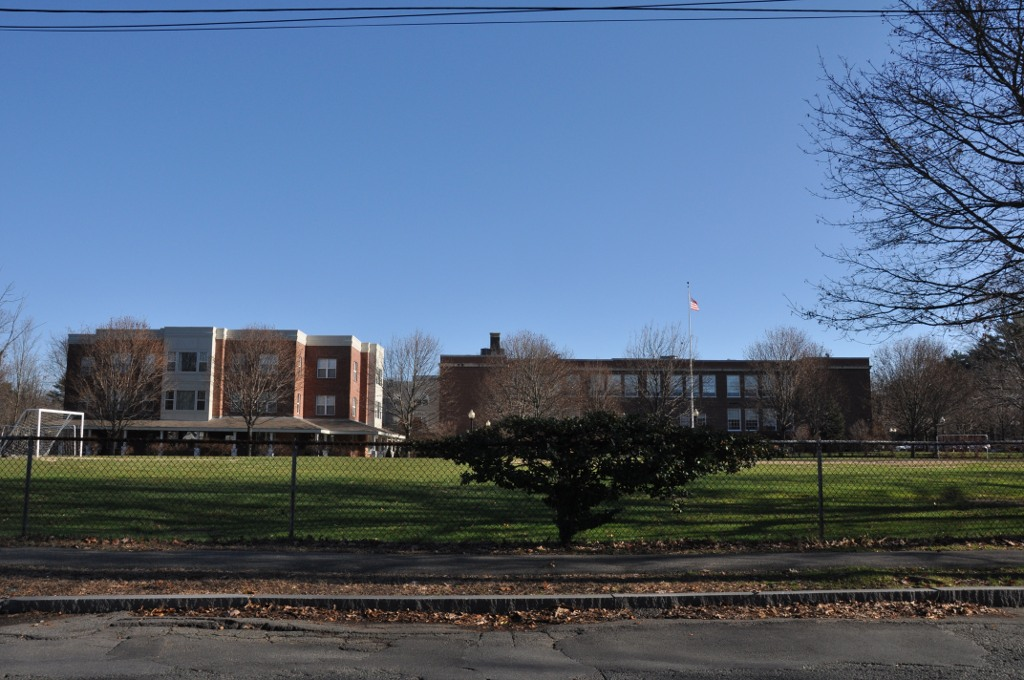

- Location within Massachusetts Location within the United States
- Location: Reading, Massachusetts
- Coordinates: 42°31′50″N 71°5′56″W
- Built: 1939
- Architect: Sidebottom, George H.; Frankini Construction Company
- Architectural style: Colonial Revival, Classical Revival, Art Deco
- NRHP reference No.: 97000496
- Added to NRHP: May 30, 1997

The Pearl Street School is a historic school building at 75 Pearl Street in Reading, Massachusetts. Built in 1939, the two-story brick and limestone building is Reading's only structure built as part of a Public Works Administration project. The site on which it was built was acquired by the town sometime before 1848, and served as its poor farm. With fifteen classrooms, the school replaced three smaller wood-frame schoolhouses in the town's school system, and was its first fire-resistant structure.

The school, designed by local architect George H. Sidebottom, is stylistically a mix of Colonial Revival, Classical Revival, and Art Deco styles. The walls are predominantly brick, with limestone and wooden trim, and the cornice is decorated with modillions. These features, and the 12-over-12 double hung windows, are typical Colonial Revival features. The building has a basic U-shaped plan, with projecting pavilions on the left and right ends, and the front facade. The legs of the U are irregular: the right-side leg is a rectangular ell, while the left side one is an irregular polygonal shape. The projecting pavilions are a typical Classical Revival feature. Art Deco surrounds frame the windows on these pavilions, and there are brick pilasters that frame the Art Deco surrounds on the entryways that are centered in each pavilion.

The building served Reading as an elementary school until 1984, when it was closed due to declining enrollment. The school board leased it to a variety of tenants, and turned it over to the town selectmen in 1989, who sold the building in 1995.

The building was listed on the National Register of Historic Places in 1997. It now houses the Residence at Pearl Street assisted living residence.

== See also ==
- National Register of Historic Places listings in Reading, Massachusetts
- National Register of Historic Places listings in Middlesex County, Massachusetts
