= John C. McLaurin =

American politician and lawyer from Mississippi

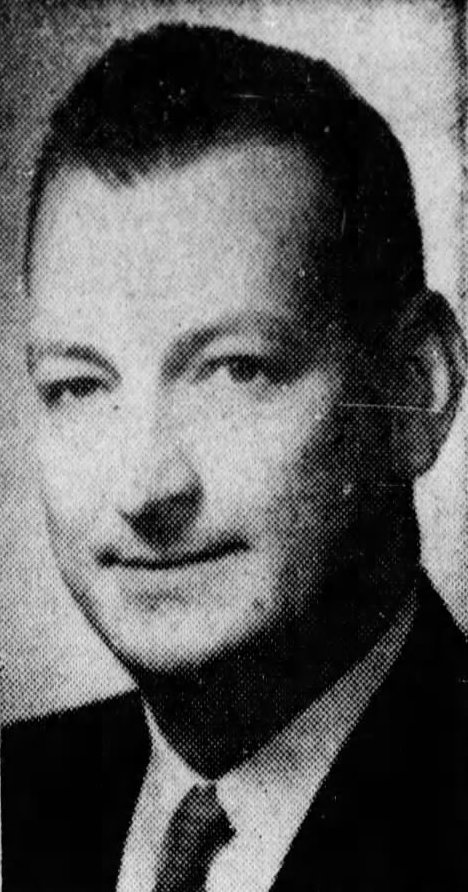
- McLaurin circa 1962

Mayor of Brandon, Mississippi
- In office 1956–1960

Mississippi State Senator from the 5th district
- In office 1960–1964

Personal details
- Born: September 2, 1926 Brandon, Mississippi
- Died: June 26, 2004 (aged 77) Brandon, Mississippi
- Party: Democratic
- Education: University of Mississippi; University of Mississippi School of Law
- Occupation: Lawyer, politician

John Campbell McLaurin was an American soldier, lawyer, and politician from Mississippi. He served in the Mississippi Senate.

McLaurin was born on September 2, 1926, in Brandon, Mississippi to Robert Sylvester and Mildred Hannah McLaurin. He attended University of Mississippi, then served in World War II. After leaving military service in 1946, he attended University of Mississippi School of Law, from which he graduated in 1948. He worked for Gulf Oil Company briefly before entering private law practice in 1955. He remained with his firm McLaurin & McLaurin until his retirement in 1991.

He served as mayor of Brandon, Mississippi from 1956 to 1960. He represented the 5th district in the Mississippi State Senate from 1960 to 1964. In 1963, he ran for state attorney general, but lost. According to his campaign ads, he was a pro-segregration Democrat.

McLaurin died on June 26, 2004, at his home in Brandon, Mississippi.
