= Dr. Trueblood House =

- U.S. National Register of Historic Places
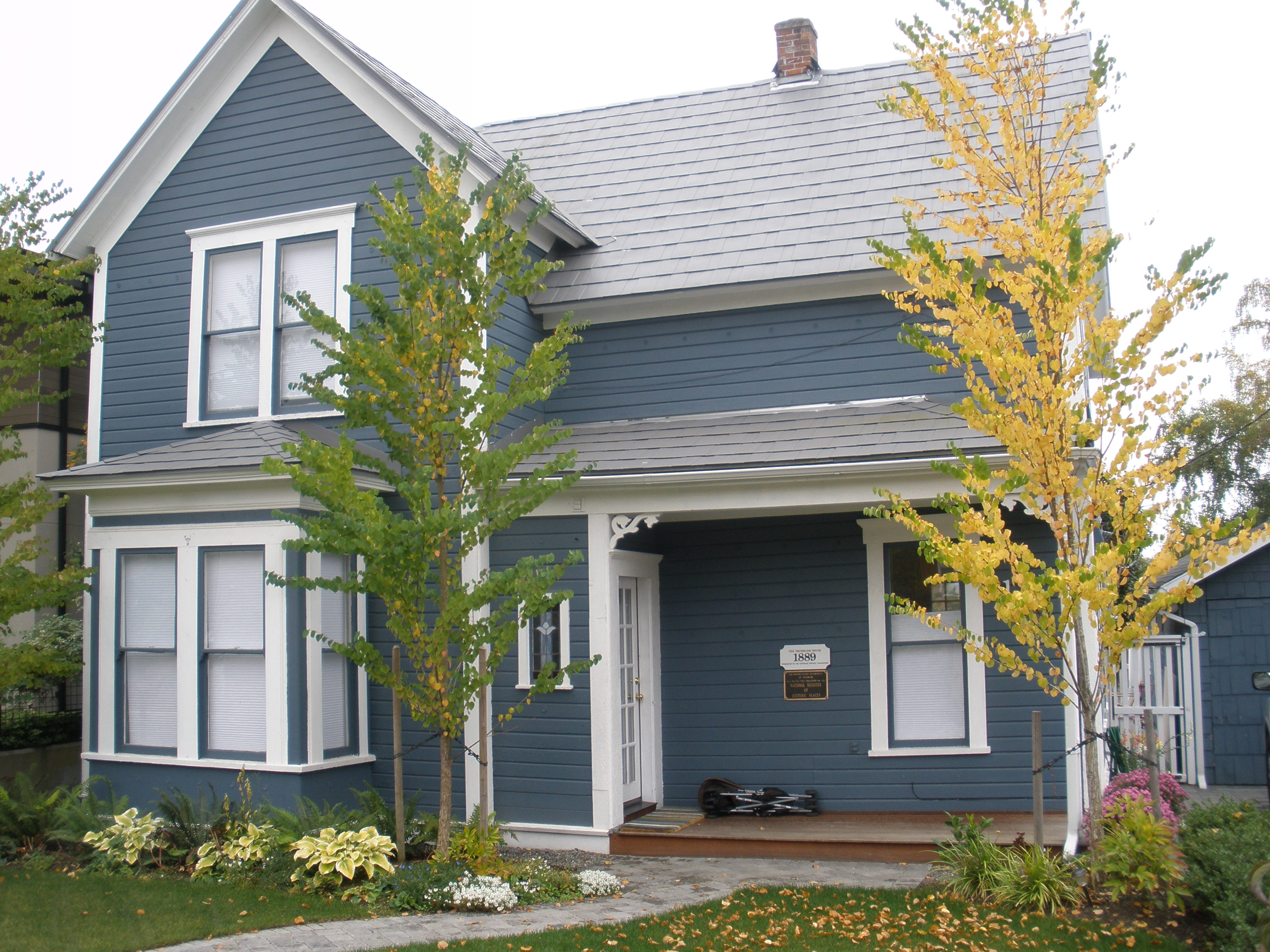
- Dr. Trueblood House

- Location within Washington (state) Location within the United States
- Location: 127 7th Ave., Kirkland, Washington (original site); 129 6th Ave., Kirkland, Washington (current site)
- Coordinates: 47.67943°N 122.20697°W (current site)
- Area: less than one acre
- Built: 1889
- Built by: Kirkland Land & Investment Co.
- Architectural style: Victorian
- MPS: Kirkland Land Improvement Company TR
- NRHP reference No.: 82004222
- Added to NRHP: August 3, 1982

Dr. Trueblood House, also known as Buchanan House, is a private residence in Kirkland, Washington. Built in 1889, it was added to the National Register of Historic Places in 1982. In 2018, it was designated a City of Kirkland Historic Landmark.

== Description ==
The Victorian wood-frame two-story farmhouse is 31 by 33 feet (9.4 m × 10.1 m). The house has three bedrooms, one bathroom, and an attic.

== History ==
Built by Peter Kirk, the founder of Kirkland, the home's original owner was William D. Buchanan, the town's first doctor. Buchanan left town the following year. Some sources state that Dr. Barkley Trueblood then lived in the home, however research done for the City of Kirkland Landmark Commission found that while no record of Dr. Trueblood ever owning or living in the house existed, there was a record that his stepson and mayor of Kirkland, Albert Newell, bought the property in 1907.

In 2016, the house was temporarily placed in a church parking lot, as developers intended to build a larger house on the original property. In 2017, the house was relocated to a new lot on 129 Sixth Avenue in Kirkland.
