= Pearl Street Historic District (Burlington, Vermont) =

Historic district in Vermont, United States

- U.S. National Register of Historic Places
- U.S. Historic district
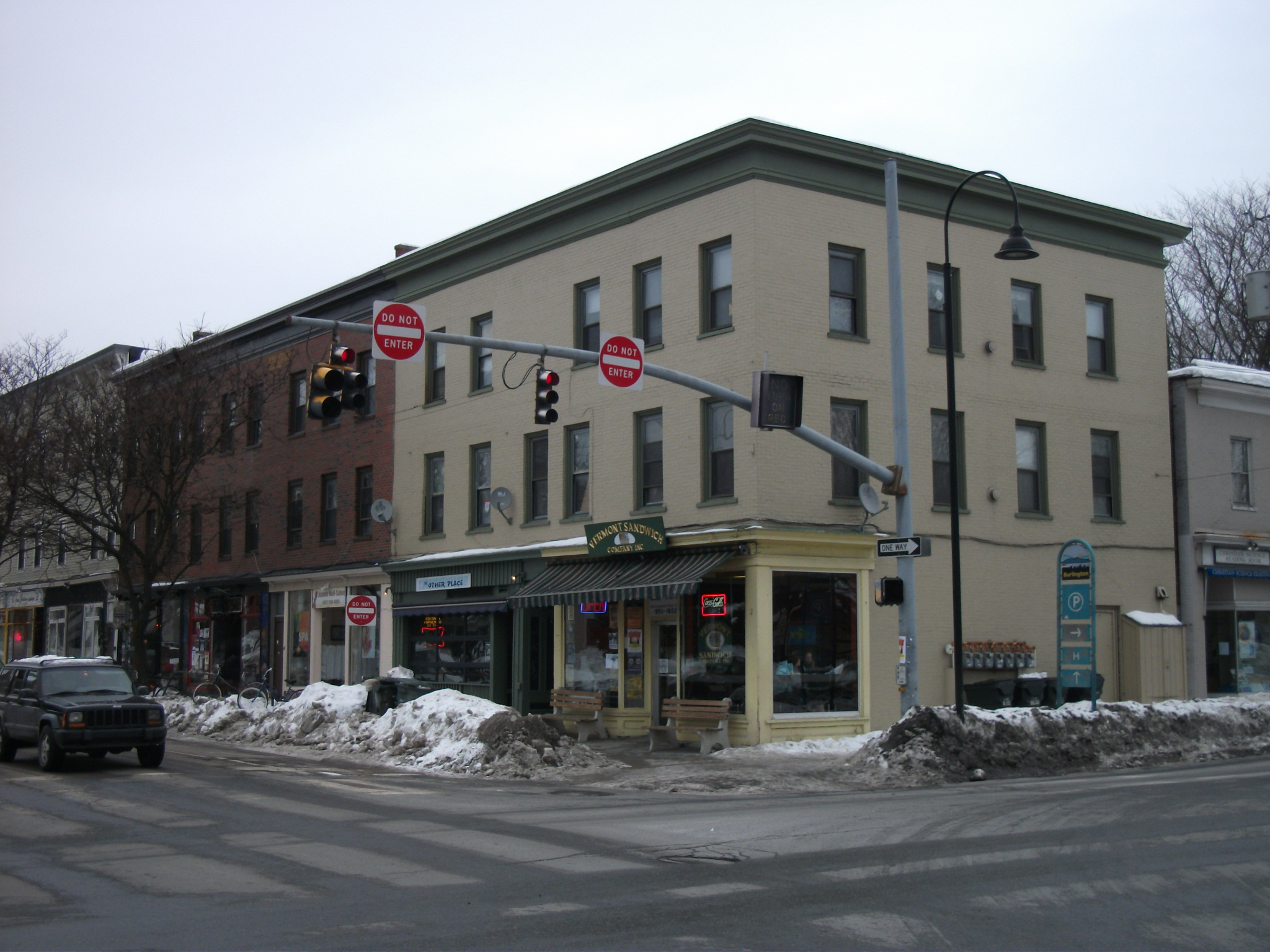

- Location within Vermont Location within the United States
- Location: Roughly 184 to 415 Pearl St., Orchard Terr., and Winooski Ave., Burlington, Vermont
- Coordinates: 44°28′50″N 73°12′29″W
- Area: 22 acres (8.9 ha)
- Architect: Cumins, A. S.; et al.
- Architectural style: Colonial Revival, Late Victorian, Federal
- NRHP reference No.: 84000416
- Added to NRHP: November 1, 1984

The Pearl Street Historic District of Burlington, Vermont encompasses part of one of the city's first major east-west transportation arteries, which developed from a fashionable residential area in the early 19th century to its present mixed use. It contains one of the city's highest concentrations of early Federal period architecture, as well as a number of fine Queen Anne and Colonial Revival houses. It was listed on the National Register of Historic Places in 1984.

== Description and history ==
When Burlington was founded in the 18th century, Pearl Street was laid out as the preferred route between the waterfront and the industrial area of the Winooski Falls on the Winooski River, bypassing a deep ravine (since filled in) to the south. The street was named for Stephen Pearl, a farmer who operated a tavern and store on the route, roughly opposite the University of Vermont (UVM) campus. The portion of the street between that area and Church Street developed in the late 18th and early 19th century as a fashionable residential area, and it is where a number of prominent businessmen and merchants built fine Federal style homes, a number of which still stand today. When Burlington's street grid was first laid out in the 19th century, Pearl Street formed the grid's northern boundary, and the street today divides north-south streets designated "North" and "South" in their names. Later in the 19th century, these larger estates were subdivided for further residential development, and the fine Federal houses became interspersed with high quality Queen Anne and later Colonial Revival houses. The lower end, near Church Street, became increasingly commercialized.

The historic district extends along Pearl Street from Clarke Street in the west to Willard Street in the east. It covers about 22 acres (8.9 ha), much of which is residential in character. The western end of the district has become somewhat commercialized, and abuts the Head of Church Street Historic District, while the eastern end abuts the University Green Historic District of the UVM campus. Most of the buildings are residential, 1-1/2 to 3 stories in height, and are typically of wood frame or brick construction. The district extends a short way south on South Winooski Street to include the First Congregational Church, a fine Greek Revival period building constructed in 1842.

== See also ==
- National Register of Historic Places listings in Chittenden County, Vermont
