= Hebron Academy (Brandon, Mississippi) =

- U.S. National Register of Historic Places
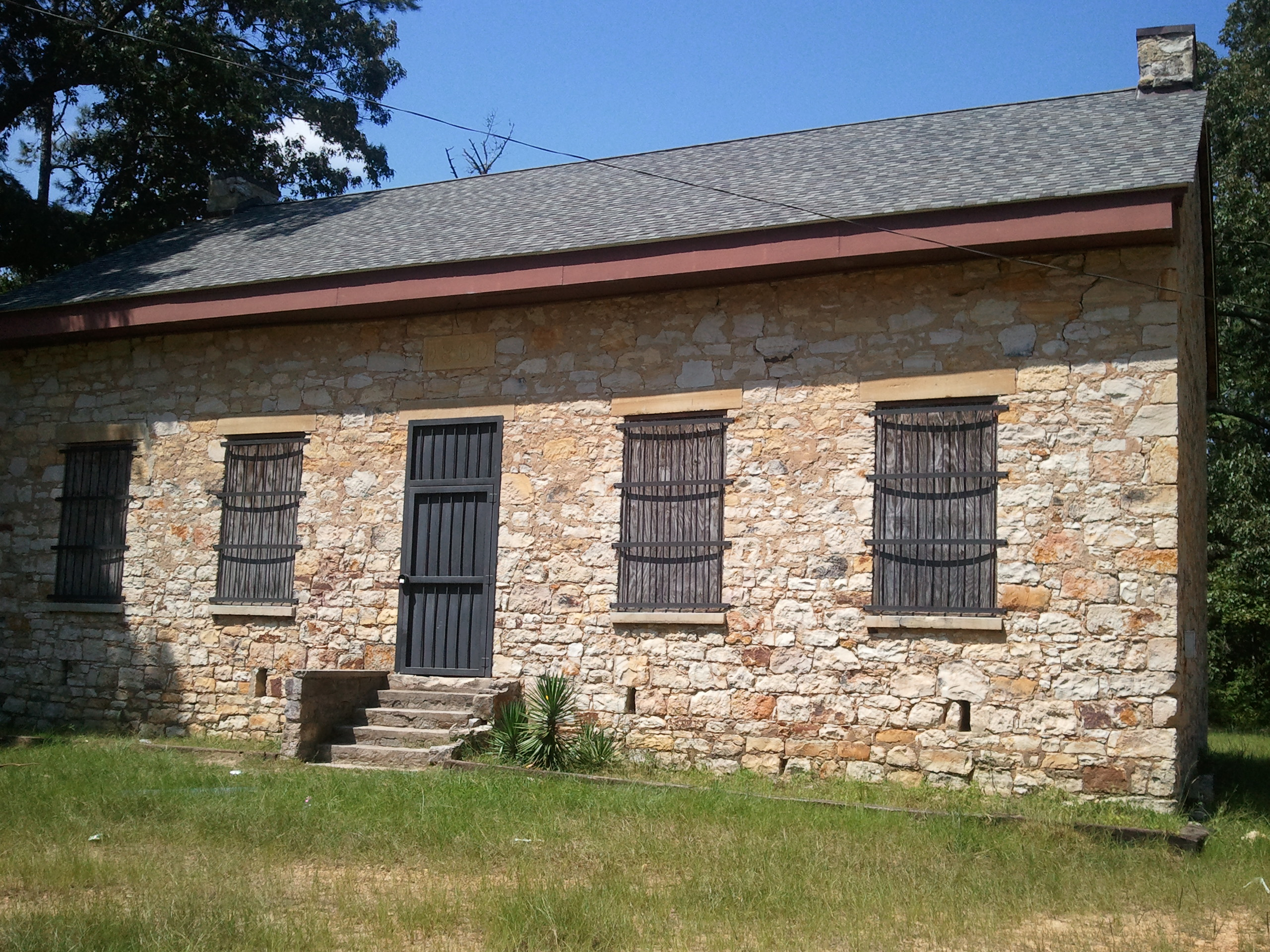
- Hebron Academy in 2013

- Location within Mississippi Location within the United States
- Nearest city: Brandon, Mississippi
- Coordinates: 32°13′49″N 89°56′36″W
- Built: 1860-61
- Built by: John Yost
- NRHP reference No.: 78001627
- Added to NRHP: May 5, 1978

Hebron Academy in Brandon, Mississippi, also known as Rock Hill School, was built during 1860–61. It was listed on the National Register of Historic Places in 1978.

It was deemed significant as "a rare example of nineteenth century vernacular masonry architecture....one of the earliest and most unusual extant rural school buildings in the state."
