= Pearl Street Market =

Public market in Cincinnati, Ohio, U.S.

Pearl Street Market or the "Lower Market" was the oldest public market in Cincinnati, Ohio. It was established in 1816. The Market stood in the middle of Pearl Street between Broadway and Sycamore Streets. Famous visitors included President James Monroe and General Lafayette. The market was torn down in 1934. The site is now occupied by the Great American Ball Park.

Other historic Cincinnati markets were Fifth Street Market (razed for construction of Fountain Square), Sixth Street Market, Court Street Market, and Findlay Market, which is still in operation.

The bell from Pearl Street Market's tower now hangs in Findlay Market.
