= Sand Hill, Rankin County, Mississippi =

Sand Hill, Mississippi
- Unincorporated community
- Location within Mississippi Location within the United States
- Coordinates: 32°29′16″N 89°52′49″W
- Country: United States
- State: Mississippi
- County: Rankin
- Elevation: 351 ft (107 m)
- Time zone: UTC-6 (Central (CST))
  - Summer (DST): UTC-5 (CDT)
- ZIP code: 39161, 39047, 39145
- Area codes: 601 & 769
- GNIS feature ID: 677341

Sand Hill or Sandhill is an unincorporated community in Rankin County, Mississippi, United States. Sand Hill is located on Mississippi Highway 25, approximately 17 miles (27 km) northeast of Flowood.

== Notable person ==
Sand Hill is the birthplace of three-time US Olympic Medalist Tori Bowie (1990-2023). Bowie won a gold medal in the 4x100m relay, a silver medal in the 100m dash, and a bronze in the 200m dash at the 2016 Rio Olympics in Rio de Janeiro, Brazil. She also won gold in the Women's 100 metres at the 2017 World Championships in London.
