= Pelahatchie, Mississippi =

Pelahatchie
- Town
- Flag Logo

- Location of Pelahatchie, Mississippi

- Location in the United States
- Coordinates: 32°18′47″N 89°47′55″W
- Country: United States
- State: Mississippi
- County: Rankin

Government
  - Type: Mayor-Council
  - Mayor: Karl VanHorn
  - Board of Aldermen: Sandra Hill; Frank Boyd; Margie Warren; James Harrell; Eddie Jones

Area
  - Total: 6.08 sq mi (15.74 km^{2})
  - Land: 5.94 sq mi (15.39 km^{2})
  - Water: 0.14 sq mi (0.35 km^{2})
- Elevation: 358 ft (109 m)

Population (2020)
  - Total: 1,272
  - Density: 214.1/sq mi (82.67/km^{2})
- Time zone: UTC-6 (Central (CST))
  - Summer (DST): UTC-5 (CDT)
- ZIP code: 39145
- Area codes: 601 & 769
- FIPS code: 28-56200
- GNIS feature ID: 0675578
- Website: pelahatchie.org

Pelahatchie is a town in Rankin County, Mississippi, United States. As of the 2020 census, Pelahatchie had a population of 1,272. It is part of the Jackson, Mississippi Metropolitan Statistical Area. Its zip code is 39145.

== History ==
Pelahatchie was founded in 1850, and named after Pelahatchie Creek. The name Pelahatchie is derived from the Native American term meaning "crooked creek". The town was the bright spot in the county during the late 1800s mainly due to the railroad access in the heart of town. Pelahatchie is home to both a public school, Pelahatchie Attendance Center (Chiefs), and a private school, East Rankin Academy (Patriots).

In June 2017, Ryshonda Harper Beechem was elected as mayor, the first African-American mayor in Rankin County. In June 2021, she was defeated in the general election by Karl VanHorn. VanHorn was reelected as mayor in June 2025 for a second term, defeating Beechem again.

== Geography ==
According to the United States Census Bureau, the town has a total area of 3.2 square miles (8.3 km^{2}), all land.

== Demographics ==
Historical population
Census	Pop.	Note	%±
1880	117		—
1890	139		18.8%
1900	326		134.5%
1910	943		189.3%
1920	1,212		28.5%
1930	1,599		31.9%
1940	938		−41.3%
1950	867		−7.6%
1960	1,066		23.0%
1970	1,306		22.5%
1980	1,445		10.6%
1990	1,553		7.5%
2000	1,461		−5.9%
2010	1,334		−8.7%
2020	1,272		−4.6%
U.S. Decennial Census

=== 2020 census ===
Pelahatchie racial composition
Race	Num.	Perc.
White (non-Hispanic)	772	60.69%
Black or African American (non-Hispanic)	409	32.15%
Asian	6	0.47%
Other/Mixed	40	3.14%
Hispanic or Latino	45	3.54%

As of the 2020 United States census, there were 1,272 people, 613 households, and 489 families residing in the town.

=== 2000 census ===
As of the census of 2000, there were 1,461 people, 525 households, and 387 families residing in the town. The population density was 454.0 inhabitants per square mile (175.3/km^{2}). There were 585 housing units at an average density of 181.8 per square mile (70.2/km^{2}). The racial makeup of the town was 61.12% White, 36.82% African American, 0.14% Asian, 0.96% from other races, and 0.96% from two or more races. Hispanic or Latino of any race were 4.52% of the population.

There were 525 households, out of which 30.9% had children under the age of 18 living with them, 47.2% were married couples living together, 20.6% had a female householder with no husband present, and 26.1% were non-families. 22.9% of all households were made up of individuals, and 9.9% had someone living alone who was 65 years of age or older. The average household size was 2.77 and the average family size was 3.22.

In the town, the population was spread out, with 26.2% under the age of 18, 10.9% from 18 to 24, 28.1% from 25 to 44, 23.6% from 45 to 64, and 11.2% who were 65 years of age or older. The median age was 35 years. For every 100 females, there were 92.7 males. For every 100 females age 18 and over, there were 93.9 males.

The median income for a household in the town was $31,597, and the median income for a family was $37,313. Males had a median income of $28,145 versus $20,813 for females. The per capita income for the town was $14,950. About 11.5% of families and 16.0% of the population were below the poverty line, including 21.9% of those under age 18 and 27.6% of those age 65 or over.

== Education ==
The Town of Pelahatchie is served by the Rankin County School District.

=== Public schools ===
- Pelahatchie Elementary School (Grades K-6)
- Pelahatchie Attendance Center (Grades 7–12).

=== Private schools ===
- East Rankin Academy

== Notable people ==
- Bruiser Kinard, member of the Pro Football Hall of Fame and College Football Hall of Fame
- Freeman King, actor and comedian
- Rubin Lacey, country blues musician
- John Moore, member of the Mississippi House of Representatives from 1996 to 2017
- A. F. Summer, Mississippi Attorney General from 1969 to 1980
