= James Buchanan House (Nashville, Tennessee) =

Historic house in Tennessee, United States

- U.S. National Register of Historic Places
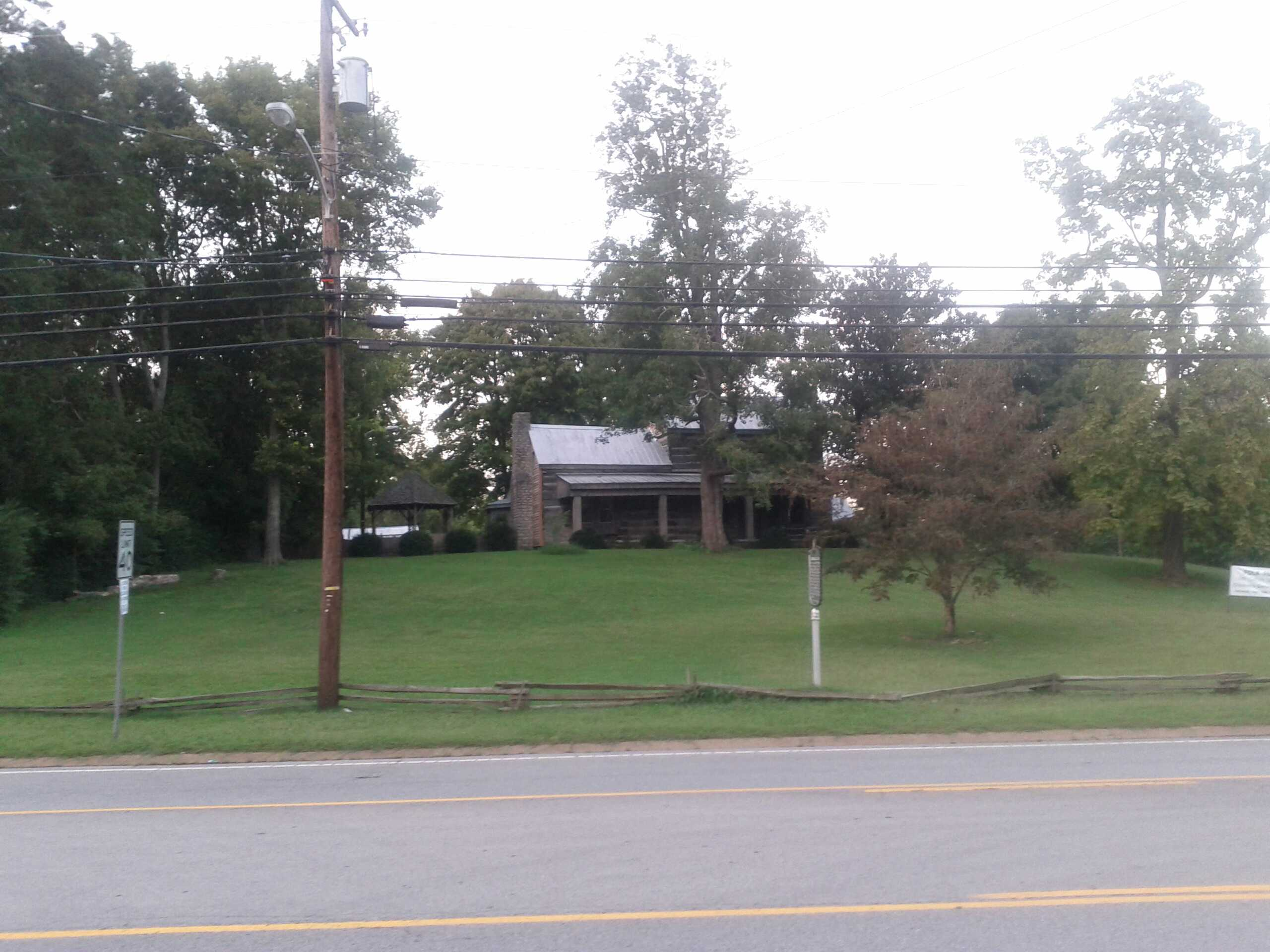
- The James Buchanan House in 2012

- Location within Tennessee Location within the United States
- Location: 2910 Elm Hill Pike, Nashville, Tennessee
- Coordinates: 36°8′41″N 86°39′26″W
- Area: 1.1 acres (0.45 ha)
- Built: c. 1800
- Built by: James Buchanan
- NRHP reference No.: 84003486
- Added to NRHP: March 29, 1984

The James Buchanan House is a historic log house in Nashville, Tennessee. It was built circa 1800 by James Buchanan, an early Nashville pioneer and signer of the 1789 Cumberland Compact. It's one of the earliest log homes still in existence in the area and is open to the public. The logs were hewn from Tennessee red cedars and nearly-extinct American chestnut trees. The floors were formed from Tennessee poplars and rest on a Tennessee limestone foundation. It has been listed on the National Register of Historic Places since March 29, 1984.
