= Brandon, Mississippi =

- City
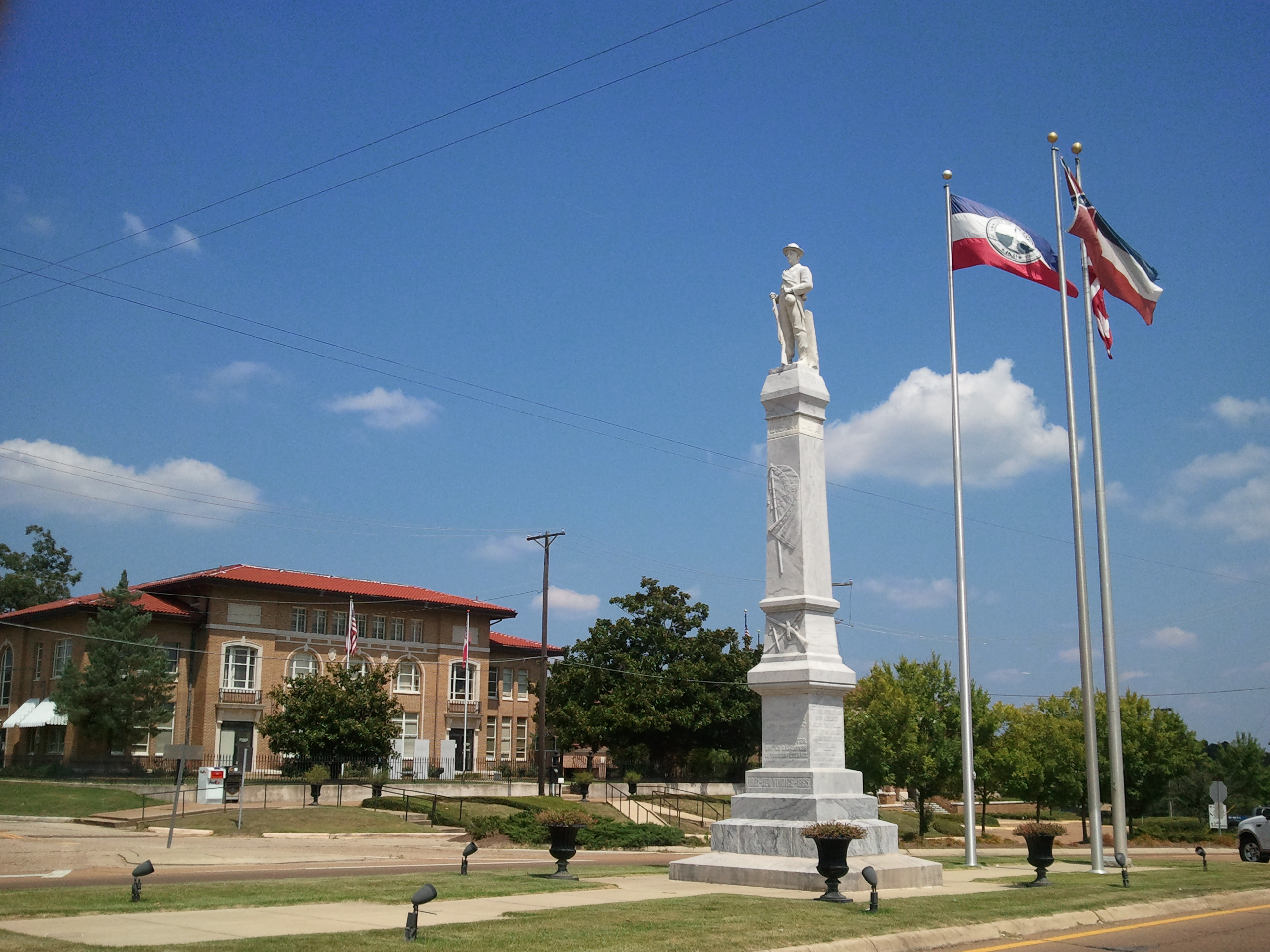
- Rankin County Courthouse and Rankin County Confederate Monument

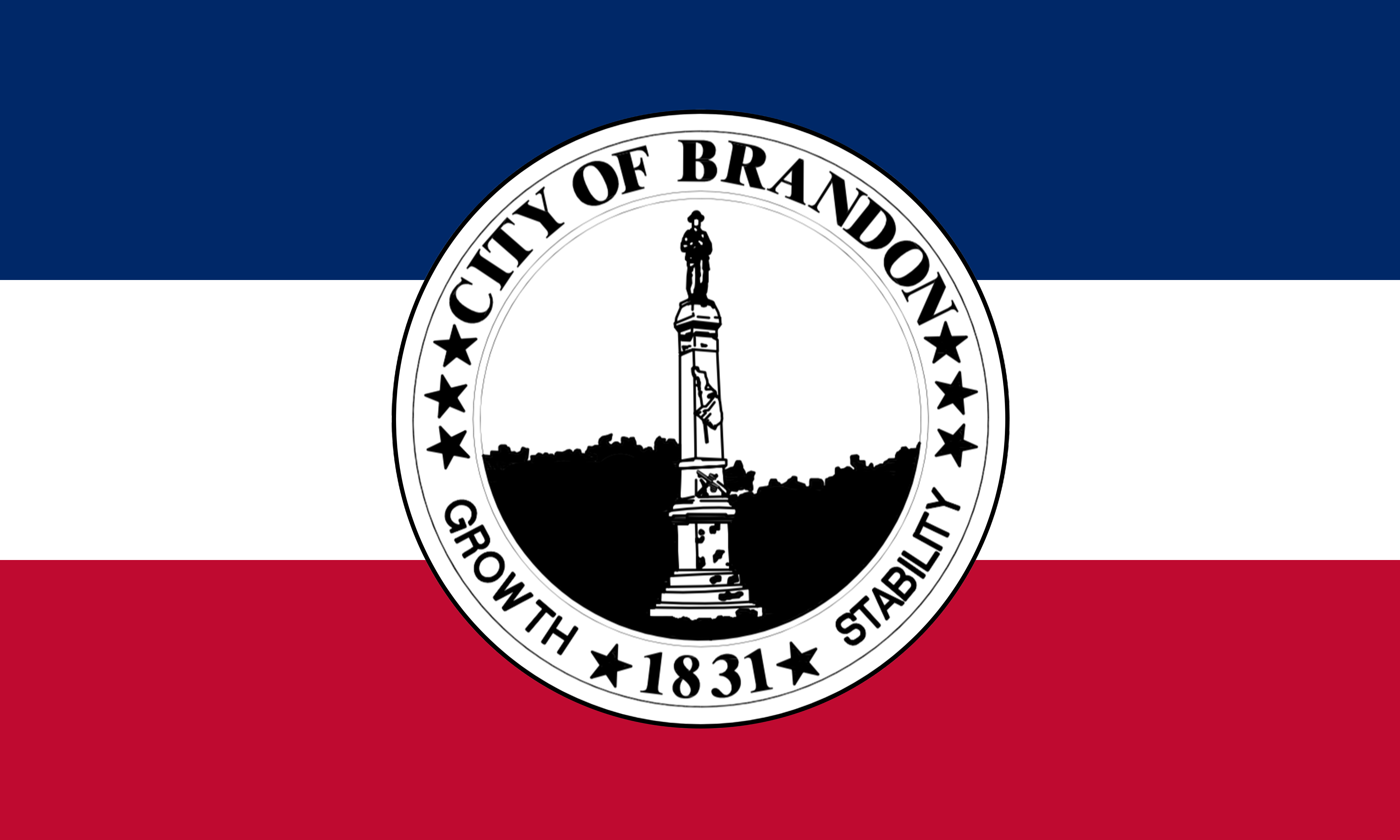
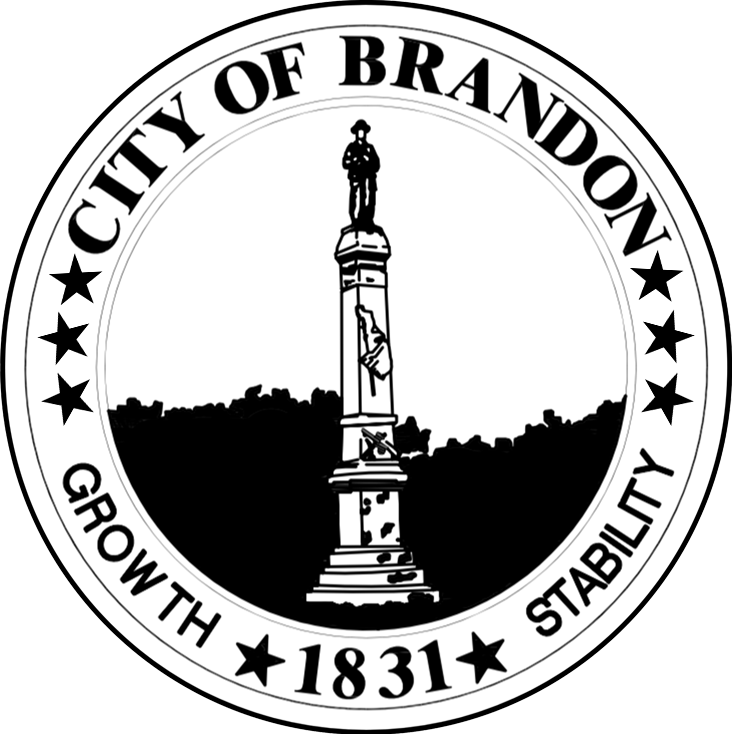
- Flag Seal Wordmark
- Nickname: "City of Red Hills Laden with Golden Opportunities"
- Motto: "Growth and Stability"
- Location of Brandon, Mississippi

- Location in the United States Brandon, Mississippi (the United States)
- Coordinates: 32°16′49″N 89°59′54″W
- Country: United States
- State: Mississippi
- County: Rankin
- Established: December 19, 1831
- Named for: Gerard Chittocque Brandon

Government
  - Type: Mayor-Council
  - Mayor: Butch Lee (R)
  - Board of Aldermen: Alderman at Large- James Morris; Ward 1- Monica Corley; Ward 2- Cris Vinson; Ward 3- Harry Williams; Ward 4- Lu Coker; Ward 5- Dwight Middleton; Ward 6- Tahya Dobbs

Area
  - Total: 25.75 sq mi (66.70 km^{2})
  - Land: 25.66 sq mi (66.47 km^{2})
  - Water: 0.089 sq mi (0.23 km^{2})
- Elevation: 482 ft (147 m)

Population (2020)
  - Total: 25,138
  - Density: 980/sq mi (378.2/km^{2})
- Demonym: Brandonite
- Time zone: UTC−6 (Central (CST))
  - Summer (DST): UTC−5 (CDT)
- ZIP codes: 39042, 39043, 39047
- Area codes: 601, 769
- FIPS code: 28-08300
- GNIS feature ID: 0667519
- Website: Official website

Brandon is a city in and the county seat of Rankin County, Mississippi, United States. It was incorporated on December 19, 1831. The population was 25,138 as of the 2020 census. A suburb of Jackson, Brandon is part of the Jackson Metropolitan Area, and is located east of the state capital.

== History ==
The city is named for Gerard Brandon, Governor of Mississippi during the early 1800s. A newspaper, The News, was established in 1892. The Brandon Bank was established in 1900, and The Rankin County Bank was established in 1906. In 1900, Brandon had a school, a telephone and telegraph office, a saw mill, two livery stables, two cotton gins, two hotels, six churches, and fifteen or twenty stores. The population was 775.

== Geography ==
According to the United States Census Bureau, the city has a total area of 21.3 square miles (55.3 km^{2}), of which 21.3 square miles (55.1 km^{2}) is land and 0.1 square mile (0.2 km^{2}) (0.37%) is water.

== Demographics ==
Historical population
Census	Pop.	Note	%±
1860	867		—
1870	756		−12.8%
1880	864		14.3%
1890	835		−3.4%
1900	775		−7.2%
1910	720		−7.1%
1920	691		−4.0%
1930	692		0.1%
1940	1,184		71.1%
1950	1,827		54.3%
1960	2,139		17.1%
1970	2,685		25.5%
1980	9,626		258.5%
1990	11,077		15.1%
2000	16,436		48.4%
2010	21,705		32.1%
2020	25,138		15.8%
U.S. Decennial Census

=== 2020 census ===
As of the 2020 census, Brandon had a population of 25,138. The median age was 39.9 years. 23.8% of residents were under the age of 18 and 18.1% of residents were 65 years of age or older. For every 100 females there were 89.4 males, and for every 100 females age 18 and over there were 84.8 males age 18 and over.

96.2% of residents lived in urban areas, while 3.8% lived in rural areas.

There were 9,732 households and 6,593 families in Brandon, of which 34.3% had children under the age of 18 living in them. Of all households, 53.7% were married-couple households, 12.9% were households with a male householder and no spouse or partner present, and 29.8% were households with a female householder and no spouse or partner present. About 25.4% of all households were made up of individuals and 11.4% had someone living alone who was 65 years of age or older.

There were 10,172 housing units, of which 4.3% were vacant. The homeowner vacancy rate was 1.3% and the rental vacancy rate was 7.5%.

Racial composition as of the 2020 census
Race	Number	Percent
White	18,655	74.2%
Black or African American	5,064	20.1%
American Indian and Alaska Native	67	0.3%
Asian	236	0.9%
Native Hawaiian and Other Pacific Islander	2	0.0%
Some other race	220	0.9%
Two or more races	894	3.6%
Hispanic or Latino (of any race)	535	2.1%

=== 2000 census ===
As of the census of 2000, there were 16,436 people, 6,295 households, and 4,595 families residing in the city. The population density was 773.2 inhabitants per square mile (298.5/km^{2}). There were 6,540 housing units at an average density of 307.7 per square mile (118.8/km^{2}). The racial makeup of the city was 86.61% White, 11.89% Black, 0.10% Native American, 0.58% Asian, 0.06% Pacific Islander, 0.30% from other races, and 0.47% from two or more races. Hispanic or Latino people of any race were 1.30% of the population.

There were 6,295 households, out of which 36.0% had children under the age of 18 living with them, 59.0% were married couples living together, 11.4% had a female householder with no husband present, and 27.0% were non-families. 23.4% of all households were made up of individuals, and 7.4% had someone living alone who was 65 years of age or older. The average household size was 2.53 and the average family size was 3.00.

In the city, the population was spread out, with 25.2% under the age of 18, 8.3% from 18 to 24, 30.4% from 25 to 44, 24.5% from 45 to 64, and 11.5% who were 65 years of age or older. The median age was 36 years. For every 100 females, there were 90.1 males. For every 100 females age 18 and over, there were 86.0 males.

The median income for a household in the city was $53,246, and the median income for a family was $63,098. Males had a median income of $42,414 versus $28,128 for females. The per capita income for the city was $24,020. About 4.1% of families and 6.0% of the population were below the poverty line, including 7.7% of those under age 18 and 10.7% of those age 65 or over.

== Economy ==
The Mississippi Department of Corrections operates the Brandon Probation and Parole Office in Brandon.

== Arts and culture ==
The Downtown Brandon Historic District is located within the city. Brandon is the location of the Black Rose Theatre Company.

Buildings on the National Register of Historic Places, including:

- Cocke-Martin-Jackson House
- Hebron Academy
- Rankin County Courthouse
- Stevens-Buchanan House
- Turcotte House

== Government ==
The City of Brandon has a city mayor as the chief executive officer and a board of aldermen, with six elected from single-member districts and one elected at-large. The current city officials are Mayor Butch Lee; Alderman, At-Large member Sharon Womack; Alderman, Ward 1 Jarrad Craine; Alderman, Ward 2 Cris Vinson; Alderman, Ward 3 Harry Williams; Alderman, Ward 4 Lu Coker; Alderman, Ward 5 Dwight Middleton; and Alderman, Ward 6 David Farris. The city's attorney is Mark C. Baker.

== Education ==
The City of Brandon is served by the Rankin County School District.

=== Public schools ===
- Brandon High School (grades 9-12)
- Brandon Middle School (grades 6-8)
- Brandon Elementary School (grades 4-5)
- StoneBridge Elementary School (grades 2-3)
- Rouse Elementary School (grades K-1)

== Infrastructure ==
The city of Brandon is served by five fire stations and one administrative central station under the direction of Fire Chief Terry Wages. In 2015, the city established an independent EMS district that provides ambulance services through a private provider, Pafford EMS. The city has one police station under the direction of Police Chief Wayne Dearman.

== Notable people ==
- Devin Britton, professional tennis player
- J. W. Buchanan, Arizona State Senator
- Demario Davis, professional football player
- Jenna Edwards, former Miss Florida and Miss Florida USA
- Aiden Flowers, actor
- Michael Guest, U.S. representative, former district attorney for Madison and Rankin counties
- Patrick Henry, (1843–1930), U.S. representative
- Volney Howard, Attorney General and U.S. Representative for Texas
- Skylar Laine, country singer; placed fifth on the eleventh season of American Idol
- Mamie Locke, political scientist, Virginia state senator
- Justin Mapp, professional soccer player
- Anselm Joseph McLaurin, Governor of Mississippi 1896–1900
- John C. McLaurin, mayor of Brandon and state senator
- Jonathan Mingo, Wide receiver for the Dallas Cowboys
- Gardner Minshew, Quarterback for the Arizona Cardinals
- Mary Ann Mobley, American actress, television personality, and first Miss America from Mississippi
- Tyler Moore, professional baseball player for the Washington Nationals
- Jerious Norwood, professional football player
- Jonathan Randolph, professional golfer
- Daisy McLaurin Stevens President General of the United Daughters of the Confederacy
- Sarah Thomas, first female NFL official
- Joe M. Turner, professional magician, mentalist, speaker
- Louis H. Wilson, Jr., 26th Commandant of the Marine Corps and member of the Joint Chiefs of Staff, recipient of The Medal of Honor

== In popular culture ==
The town was mentioned in the 1986 film Platoon by Chris Taylor, a character played by Charlie Sheen.
