= Frances Halsband =

American architect

Frances Halsband FAIA (born October 30, 1943, in New York City) is an American architect and educator. She is a founder, with Robert Kliment, of Kliment Halsband Architects, a New York City design firm widely recognized for preservation, adaptive reuse and master planning projects. Significant works include The Brown University Framework for Physical Planning, Long Island Railroad Entrance at 34 Street, Visitor Center at Franklin Roosevelt Presidential Library, Mount Sinai Ambulatory Surgery Facility Kyabirwa Uganda. The firm received the AIA Firm Award in 1997 and the New York AIA Medal of Honor in 1998.

From 1991 to 1994 Halsband was dean of the School of Architecture at Pratt Institute, and she has taught at Harvard University, Columbia University, Rice University, University of Pennsylvania, University of California, Berkeley and other institutions. She was the first woman president of AIA New York and The Architectural League of New York. She is a former commissioner of the New York City Landmarks Commission. In 2018 Halsband lead a successful effort to amend the AIA Code of Ethics to prohibit harassment or discrimination and commit to fostering a professional environment of mutual respect and equity. In recognition of this effort she was named one of Engineering News-Record (ENR) Top 25 Newsmakers. In 2019 she received an Honorary Doctor of Design from NewSchool of Architecture and Design.

== Personal life and education ==
She received her B.A. at Swarthmore College in 1965 and a master's degree from Columbia University in 1968. She has served on juries for design awards, chaired the 1999 American Institute of Architects Committee on Design, and served as AIA New York's first woman president in 1991. Halsband and Kliment were married in 1971 in Woodstock New York. Their son, Alexander Halsband Kliment was born in 1979. They made their home in New York City and Woodstock New York. Kliment retired from KHA in 2013, and died in 2017.

Halsband's interest in architecture was sparked by her grandmother and her mother, who were both involved in the field of art. She originally attended Swarthmore college as an English major, though she took an interest in hanging out at Penn with architecture students. She decided to switch to an art history major because of this to minimize the time she had to spend in class at Swarthmore. The time she spent at Swarthmore College made her decide to attend Columbia University for architecture classes where she made connections with important people. Once she finished her studies at Columbia, she began her work at Mitchell Giugola Architects, where she worked under Robert Kliment. After he had been her boss for a few years, they decided to start their firm together in 1972.

== Professional practice ==
- Kliment Halsband Architects, New York, New York – 2008–present
- R.M. Kliment & Frances Halsband Architects, New York, New York – 1978–2008
- R.M. Kliment Architect, New York, New York – 1972–1977
- Mitchell/Giurgola Architects, New York, New York -1968–1972

=== Selected projects ===
This selection is specific to projects for which Halsband has been principally responsible

- Arcadia University Commons, Glenside, Pennsylvania (2012)
- Arcadia University Landman Library, Glenside, Pennsylvania (2003)
- Avalon Morningside at the Cathedral of St. John the Divine, New York, New York (2008)
- Brown University Strategic Framework for Physical Planning, Providence, Rhode Island (2003/2009)
- Dartmouth College Roth Center for Jewish Life, Hanover, New Hampshire (1998)
- Friends Seminary, New York, New York (2019)
- Johns Hopkins University Gilman Hall, Baltimore, Maryland (2010)
- Long Island Railroad Entrance at Pennsylvania Station, New York, New York (1994)
- Mount Sinai Ambulatory Surgery Facility Kyabirwa Uganda, Africa (2019)
- University of Chicago Neubauer Collegium for Culture and Society, Chicago, Illinois (2015)
- University of Massachusetts Amherst South College, Amherst, Massachusetts (2017)
- Franklin D. Roosevelt Presidential Library Henry A. Wallace Visitor and Education Center, Hyde Park, New York (2004)
- Zen Mountain Monastery Sangha House, Mt. Tremper, New York (2013)

== Personal achievements ==
=== Honors ===
- Honorary Doctor of Design, NewSchool of Architecture and Design – 2019
- Engineering News Record 2018 Top 25 Newsmaker – 2019
- AIA Firm Award, R.M. Kliment & Frances Halsband Architects – 1998
- AIA New York Medal of Honor, R.M. Kliment & Frances Halsband Architects – 1997
- Fellow of the American Institute of Architects – 1986
- Chancellor of the AIA College of Fellows - 2023

=== Civic and professional boards ===
- AIA College of Fellows executive committee – 2019–present
- Harvard University, Design Review Panel – 2005–2009
- Woodstock Byrdcliffe Guild, board of directors, (president 2008–2013) – 2003–present
- Brown University, architect advisor, board of trustees – 2002–2013
- AIA Committee on Design, chair 1999
- U.S. Department of State Office of Foreign Buildings Operations Architectural Advisory Board – 1998–2003
- Smith College, architect advisor to the board of trustees – 1998–2003
- U.S. General Services Administration National Register of Peer Professionals – 1998–2010
- ACSA, northeast regional director – 1993–1995
- Federal Reserve Bank Architectural Review Panel – 1993–2009
- AIA New York Chapter, president – 1992
- AIA New York Chapter Women in Architecture Leadership Network founder – 1991
- New York City Landmarks Preservation Commission, commissioner – 1984–1987
- New York State Council on the Arts, Architecture Panel – 1980–1983
- The Architectural League of New York, (president 1985–1989) - 1975–present

Academic appointments

- University of Maryland, Kea Visiting Distinguished Professor – 2009
- University of Cincinnati, visiting professor, Neihoff Studio – 2002
- University of Illinois Urbana-Champaign, Plym Professor – 2001
- Ball State University, Emens Distinguished Professor – 1998–1999
- University of California Berkeley, Howard A. Friedman Visiting Professor – 1997
- Pratt Institute School of Architecture, dean – 1991–1994
- Columbia University, visiting critic in design – 1987
- University of Pennsylvania, visiting critic in design – 1981
- Harvard University, visiting critic in design – 1980
- University of Virginia, visiting critic in design – 1979
- Rice University, visiting critic in design – 1979
- North Carolina State University, visiting critic in design – 1978
- Columbia University, visiting critic in design – 1975–1978

== Selected publications ==
=== Published writings ===
- “Not a Park.” In Maintaining: Public Works in the Next New York. New York, New York: Urban Design Forum, 2019.
- “A Different Kind of Place,” Faith & Form: The Interfaith Journal on Religion, Art, and Architecture, Vol. 52, No. 1, 2019
- “Reverence and Reconstruction,” Faith & Form: The Interfaith Journal on Religion, Art, and Architecture, Vol. 50, No. 2, 2017
- “Living and Learning: The Campus Redefined,” The Chronicle of Higher Education, April 28, 2006
- “Charles Klauder’s Brilliant Invisible Hand.” The Chronicle of Higher Education, March 25, 2005
- “Campuses in Place” In Places Journal: Considering the Place of Campus, Vol. 17, Issue 1, Winter 2005
- "Introduction to The Inhabited Landscape: An Exhibition,” Places Journal, Volume 4/4, 1988

=== Illustrations ===
- Halsband, Frances (Illustrator), Publishing: a writer's memoir, by Gail Godwin, Bloomsbury, 2015
- Halsband, Frances (Illustrator), “Ulster County Ghosts,” by Gail Godwin, Kingston: The IBM Years, The Friends of Historic Kingston/Black Dome Press, Delmar New York, 2014
- Halsband, Frances, (Illustrator), Evenings at Five, by Gail Godwin, Ballantine Books, 2003.

== Works from Kliment Halsband Architects ==
=== New York University Advanced Research Institutes ===
The New York University Advanced Research Institutes offers "open loft floors provide a range of innovative collaborative environments for research institutes, shared university classrooms, and a conference center." The offices are also enclosed by glass, which offer both a manner of interaction and privacy. The building offers several open work spaces and small offices that can be used as study rooms, classrooms, or workshops.

=== SUNY College of Optometry Lobby & Center for Student Life & Learning ===
The College of Optometry is made up of a 10,517 square foot lobby and a 14,985 square foot student center, which is filled with light colors and bright non-glare lighting. The space is meant to be welcoming and encourage student interaction with patients.
