= Neubauer Collegium for Culture and Society =

Educational institution in Chicago, Illinois

Coordinates: 41°47′28.6″N 87°35′45.7″W

- Established: 2012
- Location: 5701 S. Woodlawn Ave; Chicago, Illinois 60637; United States
- Website: neubauercollegium.uchicago.edu

The Neubauer Collegium for Culture and Society is a collaborative research center located on the campus of the University of Chicago in Chicago, Illinois.

== History ==
The Neubauer Collegium was established in June 2012. It was founded with a gift of $26.5-million from Joseph Neubauer, former CEO and chairman of Aramark Corporation, and Jeanette Lerman-Neubauer, founder of the Philadelphia marketing and communications firm, J.P. Lerman & Company. A second major gift came from Emmanuel Roman, CEO of PIMCO and a University of Chicago graduate in whose honor the head of the Collegium is named the Roman Family Director. Gallery exhibitions at the Neubauer Collegium, along with other projects addressing themes such as the environment and media, are supported by the Brenda Mulmed Shapiro Fund.

=== Location ===
The collegium occupies an historic 16,000 sq. ft. Collegiate Gothic style building erected in 1933 as the home of the Meadville Lombard Theological School, adjacent to the campus of the University of Chicago in Hyde Park which was purchased by the university in 2011 and was renovated by Kliment Halsband Architects.

== Gallery ==
The gallery at the Neubauer Collegeium has hosted a number of high-profile exhibits, including those by Zoya Cherkassky, Fredrik Værslev, and Betye Saar. Its curator is Dieter Roelstraete, who was appointed in 2017.

== Leadership ==
Aside from administrative staff the Neubauer Collegium also has a faculty director that oversees the activities of the center, and a faculty advisory board that serves in a consultative role. Tara Zahra has served as the faculty director since July 2022.
