= Downtown Brandon Historic District =

Historic district in Mississippi, United States

- U.S. National Register of Historic Places
- U.S. Historic district
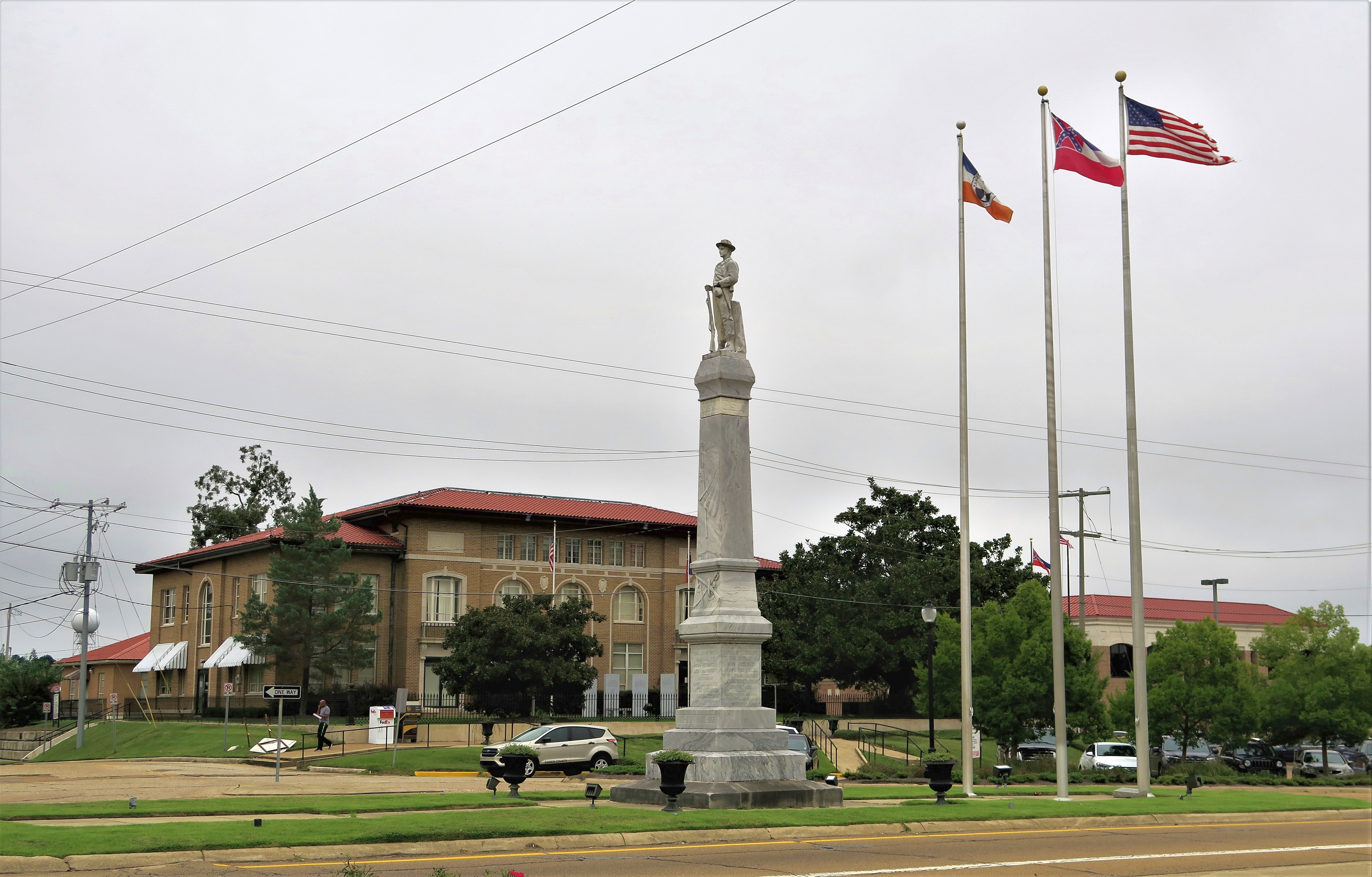

- Location within Mississippi Location within the United States
- Location: E and W Government Sts from Timber St to College St, 100 blocks of N College St and Black St, Brandon, Mississippi, U.S.
- Coordinates: 32°16′23″N 89°59′16″W
- NRHP reference No.: 10000926
- Added to NRHP: November 18, 2010

The Downtown Brandon Historic District is a ten-acre district consisting of the downtown square of Brandon, Mississippi, United States, mainly located along a section of East and West Government Street. The district also includes the 100th block of North College Street, where St. Luke's Episcopal Church and the Purvis House are located; as well as the 100th block of Black Street, where a historic African American Theater is located. The district was added to the National Register of Historic Places in 2010. The district includes two other places listed on the NRHP: the Rankin County Confederate Monument and the Rankin County Courthouse.

== Description and history ==
Presently, the district is largely commercial, home to a number of local businesses, as well as a community theater and administrative buildings of the local government. There are also some residential buildings and a church. The majority of the buildings in the district were originally constructed between 1929 and 1950, with some later additions in more recent years. The architectural style of most buildings is brick-and-mortar, though some building now have a more modern appearance following renovations.

A fire in 1924 destroyed much of the greater downtown area, including the original Rankin County Courthouse; which was then rebuilt by famous architect Noah Webster Overstreet, and was later added to the National Register of Historic Places. The fire spared one building of historical significance: the Ohleyer Building, which is now the believed to be oldest existing structure in the downtown district area.

=== Rankin County Courthouse ===
See the Wikipedia article for the Rankin County Courthouse

=== Confederate Monument ===
See the Wikipedia article for Rankin County Confederate Monument

=== The Purvis House ===
The Purvis House is a two-story mixed residential/commercial building located on North College Street. The house was constructed in 1946 and has served many purposes with its last occupants prior to renovation being Beginning Again in Christ, a home that helped others get on their feet again in life after incarceration. In 1998, it was purchased by attorney, Samuel Dennis Joiner and his wife, Marsha Joiner. They renovated the property extensively as a law office and brought the dilapidated property back to historic district beauty standards.

=== Ohleyer Building ===
The Ohleyer Building is a pre-Civil War era building, constructed by a family of French-born immigrants. The history of the building is not well documented. A website dedicated to Rankin County history (article by rankinhistory.com) reported the recollections of long-time residents regarding the history of the building and its construction. The account includes the following description:

"This two-storied building of hand-hewn rock was built at the tremendous cost of $6,000. The story goes that he discovered the local rock deposit, hauled rock into town, shaped each one and then put them in place – all by himself. The walls were made two feet thick of solid rock held together with cement. It is thought to be the first two-storied building in Brandon."

The building was one of few that survived a large fire in 1924, and is currently believed to be the oldest structure in the downtown district area.

=== African American Theater ===
Currently known as Black Rose Theater.
