= Kliment Halsband Architects =

Architectural firm

- Industry: Architecture
- Predecessor: New York City, U.S.
- Founders: Frances Halsband and Robert Kliment
- Headquarters: New York City, U.S.
- Services: Architecture; Master Planning; Historic Preservation; Interior Design; Adaptive Reuse
- Number of employees: 23
- Website: https://www.kliment-halsband.com/

Kliment Halsband Architects (KHA) was founded in New York City in 1972 by Robert Kliment and Frances Halsband. The New York City based firm is known for their architecture, master planning, interior design, adaptive reuse, historic preservation and transformation of institutional buildings. KHA's work expertise includes cultural, educational, governmental, and most recently healthcare buildings. In 2022, Kliment Halsband Architects joined forces with Perkins Eastman to become "Kliment Halsband Architects—A Perkins Eastman Studio."

== Ethics ==
KHA is a known advocate for a professional and collegial environment, equitable treatment, and for denouncing any discriminatory, intimidating, abusive, or harassing behavior. In 2018, co-founder Frances Halsband led a successful effort to amend the AIA Code of Ethics to prohibit harassment or discrimination and commit to fostering a professional environment of mutual respect and equity. In recognition of this effort, she was named one of ENR's "Top 25 Newsmakers" in 2018. Frances also served as the first woman president of the Architectural League of New York (1985 to 1989), the first woman dean at Pratt Institute (1991 to 1994), and the first woman president of AIA New York (1991). In 2022, she was named the 61st Chancellor of the College of Fellows of the American Institute of Architects.

== Notable Projects ==
KHA has a diverse portfolio that includes projects across the country—from a new federal courthouse in Gulfport, Mississippi, to the preservation and adaptive reuse of Gilman Hall at Johns Hopkins University in Baltimore, to a new performance and exhibition space at Zen Mountain Monastery in Mt. Tremper, New York.

=== Education ===
- Arcadia University Landman Library, Glenside, PA (2003) - AIA / American Library Association Award of Excellence 2005
- Case Western Reserve University Adelbert Hall Administration Building, Cleveland, OH (2002) - Cleveland Engineering Society Award of Excellence 1996
- Columbia University Computer Science Building, New York, NY (1983) - National AIA Honor Award for Excellence in Architectural Design 1987
- Columbia University Hamilton Hall, New York, NY (2004)
- Dartmouth College Roth Center for Jewish Life, Hanover, NH (1998) - Faith & Form Religious Architecture Award 2000
- Friends Seminary, New York, NY (2019)- National Association of Landscape Professionals Award of Excellence 2019
- Johns Hopkins University Gilman Hall, Baltimore, MD (2010) - Society for College and University Planning Excellence in Architecture Honor Award 2011
- New York University School of Global Public Health, New York, NY (2021)
- Princeton University Computer Science Building, Princeton, NJ (1990) - National AIA Honor Award for Architecture 1994
- The Rockefeller University Welch Hall Library, New York, NY (2013)
- Spence School, New York, NY (2013)
- University of Chicago Neubauer Collegium for Culture & Society, Chicago, IL (2015) - Chicago Silver Design Award 2016
- University of Massachusetts Amherst South College, Amherst, MA (2017) - AIA Western Massachusetts Design Citation 2018
- Yale University Sterling Divinity Quadrangle, New Haven, CT (1996/2009) - New Haven Preservation Trust Landmark Awards 2019

=== Civic and Cultural ===
- Avalon Morningside at Cathedral of St John the Divine, New York, NY (2008)
- Franklin D. Roosevelt Presidential Library Henry A. Wallace Visitor and Education Center, Hyde Park, NY (2004) - AIA Committee on Architecture in Education Educational Facility Design Award of Excellence 2007
- Long Island Rail Road Entrance at Pennsylvania Station, New York, NY (1994) - National AIA Honor Award for Architecture 1996
- Mount Sinai Kyabirwa Ambulatory Surgical Facility, Uganda, Africa (2019) - AIANY Design Award Sustainability 2020
- Conrad B. Duberstein U.S. Bankruptcy Courthouse, Brooklyn, NY (2006) - U.S. General Services Administration Design Award for Preservation 2009
- Dan M. Russell Jr. United States Courthouse, Gulfport, MS (2003) - National AIA Committee on Architecture for Justice Citation 2004
- Zen Mountain Monastery Sangha House, Mt. Tremper, NY (2013)

=== Master Planning ===
- Brooklyn College Master Plan, Brooklyn, NY (1995) - Society for College and University Planning Merit Award in Campus Heritage 2005
- Brown University Strategic Framework for Physical Planning, Providence, RI (2003/2009)
- Columbia University Lamont Doherty Earth Science Laboratory, Palisades, NY (1997)
- Harvard Divinity School Master Plan, Cambridge, MA (2009)
- Smith College 2050 Plan, Northampton, MA (2000) - Society for College and University Planning Merit Award 2004

== Firm Awards ==
The firm received the American Institute of Architects Firm Award in 1997, the highest honor given by the AIA, the AIA New York City Medal of Honor in 1998, and over 150 awards for design excellence.
