= Bloom's Arcade =

- U.S. National Register of Historic Places
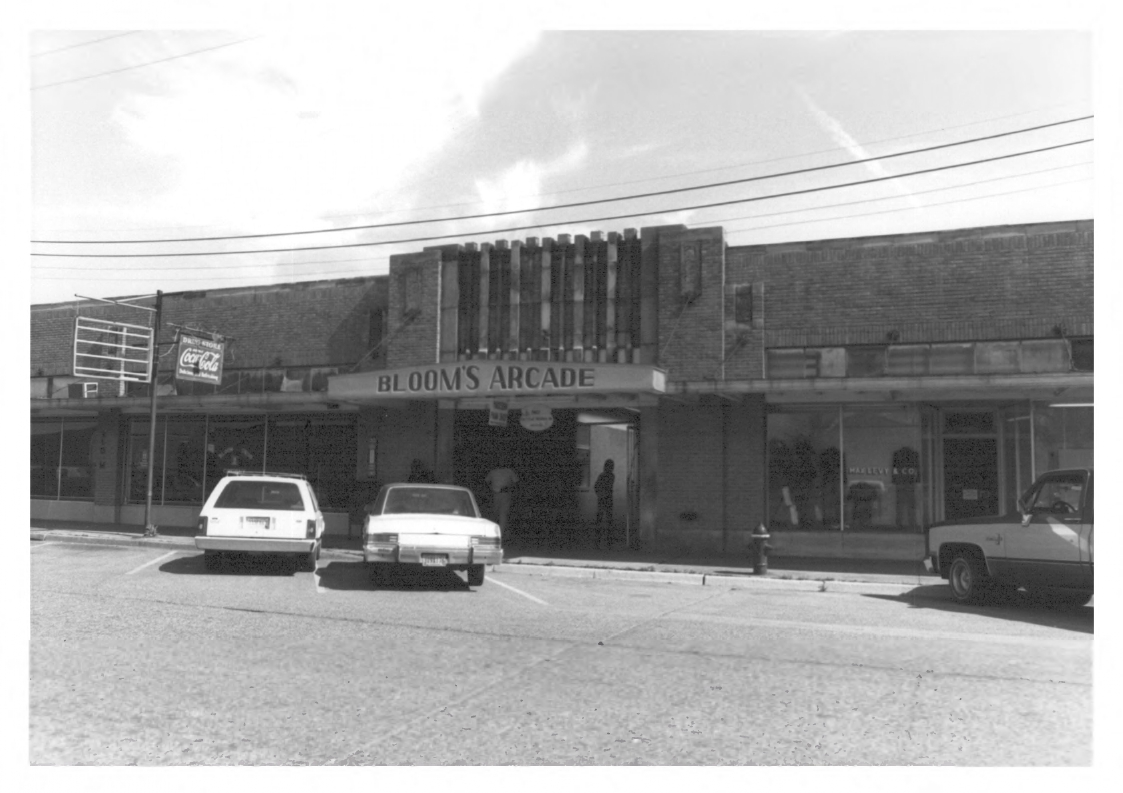

- Location within Louisiana Location within the United States
- Location: 102 Depot Street, Tallulah, Louisiana
- Coordinates: 32°24′35″N 91°11′28″W
- Area: 1.5 acres (0.61 ha)
- Built: 1930
- Architect: Noah Webster Overstreet
- Architectural style: Moderne
- NRHP reference No.: 88003214
- Added to NRHP: January 19, 1989

Bloom's Arcade, now known as Blooms Apartments, is a Moderne-style shopping arcade built in 1930 in Tallulah, Louisiana, United States. It was listed on the National Register of Historic Places on January 19, 1989.

The arcade includes 12 interior shop bays marked by brick pilasters. The arcade space is capped by a continuous glass skylight. It has checkerboard terrazzo floors and pressed metal paneled ceilings in many of the shops. It was designed by architect Noah Webster Overstreet of Jackson, Mississippi and was built by contractor Tom Wilmoth of Camden, Arkansas.

Its 1989 NRHP nomination stated "the arcade clearly retains its original character as a unique Louisiana example of what is essentially a European phenomenon."

In 2013 the structure was completely restored by Brownstone Group and is now housing an apartments complex.

== See also ==
- National Register of Historic Places listings in Madison Parish, Louisiana
