= Joseph Neubauer =

American businessman

- Born: October 19, 1941; Mandatory Palestine
- Education: Tufts University (BA), University of Chicago (MBA)
- Occupation: CEO
- Years active: 1983-2014
- Employer: Aramark
- Political party: Republican

Joseph Neubauer (born October 19, 1941 in Mandatory Palestine) is an American businessman and the former CEO of Aramark Corporation. Before joining Aramark, he was vice-president at PepsiCo and Chase Manhattan Bank. Neubauer is listed at #82 on Fortune's top paid CEO list. As a CEO he was able to lead Aramark to a successful fiscal year in 2010, generating around $12.6 billion in revenue. He was elected to the American Philosophical Society in 2007. In December 2014, Neubauer announced his retirement from Aramark.

== Philanthropy ==
Neubauer and his wife, Jeanette Lerman-Neubauer, are the founding donors of the Neubauer Family Collegium for Culture and Society at the University of Chicago. They also fund the Neubauer Family Foundation, based in Philadelphia, Pennsylvania. Through his Neubauer Family foundation, he was a key financial supporter of the Pew Research Center's 2013 and 2020 surveys of American Jews; and is a supporter of Brandeis University, the Jewish Theological Seminary of America, and Jewish museums in Berlin, Warsaw, and Israel.
