= Old Gulfport High School (Mississippi) =

Historic building in Gulfport, Mississippi, United States

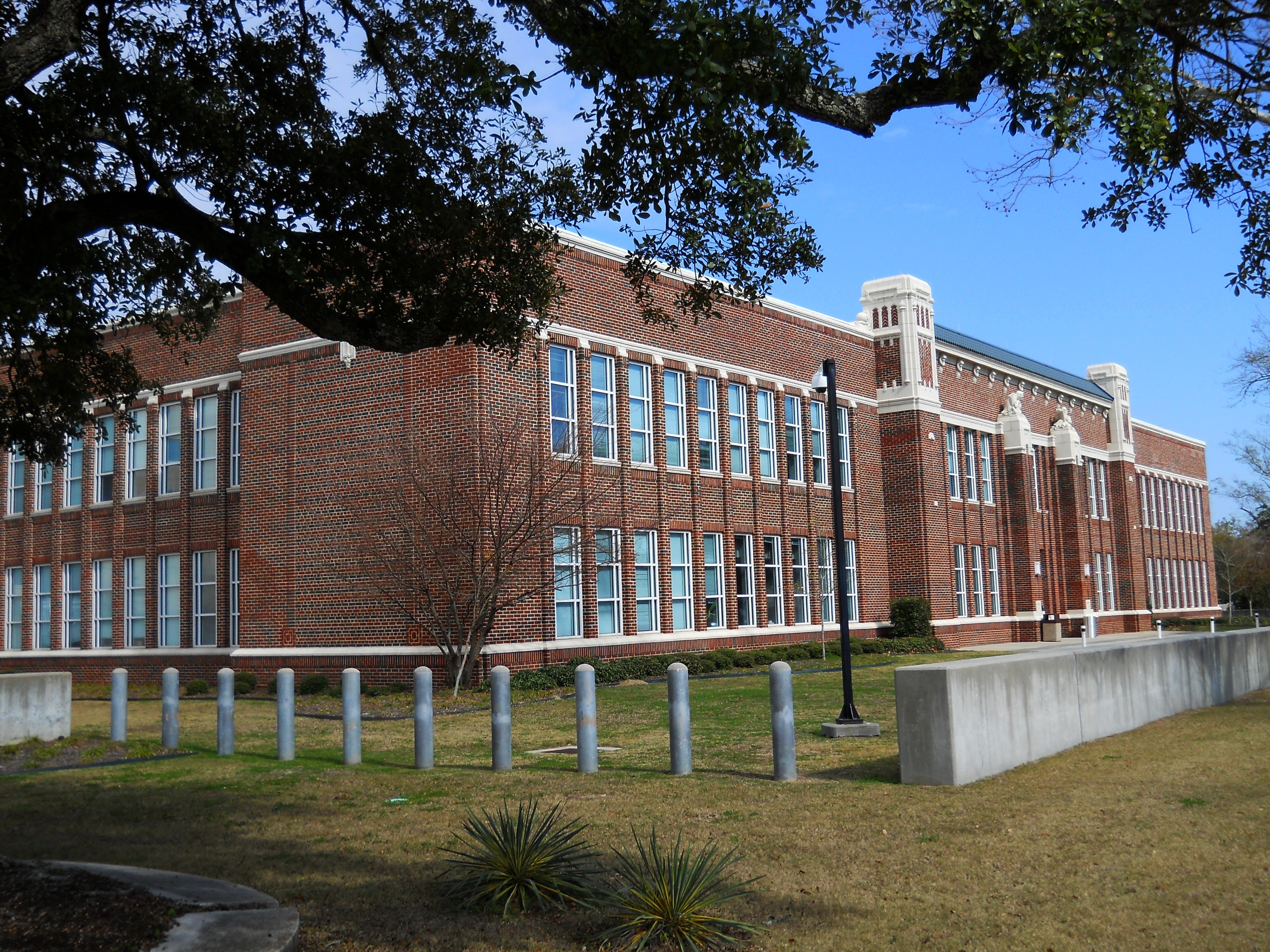
- Old Gulfport High School in 2013

- Location within Mississippi
- 30.36985°N 89.08674°W
- Location: 2010 15th Street, Gulfport, Mississippi

History
- Built: 1923

Site notes
- Restored: 2001–2003
- Restored by: General Services; Administration (GSA)
- Governing body: GSA

Mississippi Landmark
- Official name: (Old) Gulfport High School Complex
- Designated: July 15, 1999
- Reference no.: 047-GLF-0101

Old Gulfport High School, located at 2010 15th Street, in Gulfport, Mississippi, is a two-story, brick building that was used as a public school from the 1920s until the latter half of the 20th century. The structure was designed in Tudor architectural style by architect Noah Webster Overstreet and was built in 1923 by Algernon Blair Construction Company The building complex was designated a Mississippi Landmark in 1999.

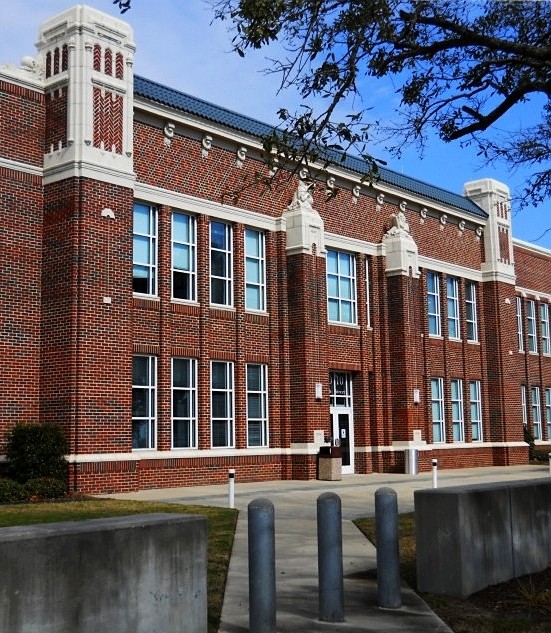
Entrance facade in 2013

Having stood vacant for a number of years, the old high school building and grounds were selected by the General Services Administration in 2000 as the site for construction of the Dan M. Russell Jr. United States Courthouse. Included in the construction of the federal courthouse was the renovation of the old high school building for use as a federal court office complex by the U.S. Attorney and probation officers. Renovation was completed in 2003, and the old high school was designated the Dan M. Russell Jr. Courthouse Annex. A multi-modal transportation center was constructed on the site of the former Gulfport High School Administration property, just south of the old high school.
