= Lamar Life Building =

Historic building in Jackson, Mississippi

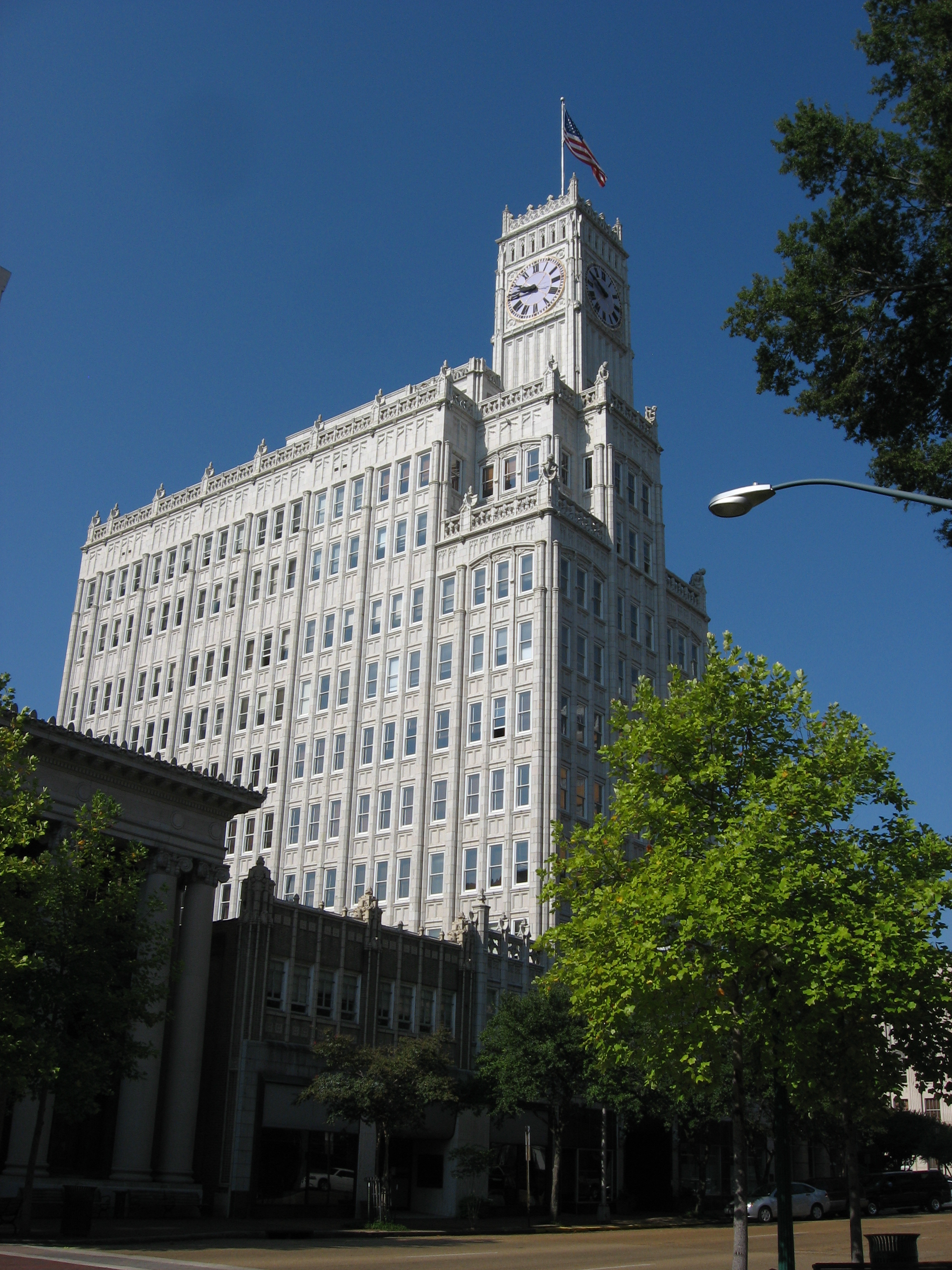
- Interactive map of the Lamar Life Building area

General information
- Type: Commercial
- Location: 317 East Capitol Street, Jackson, Mississippi
- Coordinates: 32.29938°N 90.18346°W
- Construction started: 1923
- Completed: 1924

Technical details
- Floor count: 10

Design and construction
- Architects: Sanguinet, Staats & Hedrick; Noah Webster Overstreet

The Lamar Life Building is a historic building in Jackson, Mississippi, US. It was designed in the Gothic Revival architectural style, and it was completed in 1924. It is the twelfth tallest building in Jackson, and was considered Jackson's first skyscraper. The architects were Sanguinet, Staats & Hedrick of Fort Worth, Texas in association with Jackson architect Noah Webster Overstreet.

The building is across the street from the Governor's Mansion and underwent renovations in 2018. Notably, these renovations converted the building into mixed-use by adding 23 residential units on floors 7 through 11.
