= Noah Webster Overstreet =

American architect (1888–1973)

- Born: July 4, 1888; Eastabuchie, Mississippi
- Died: October 12, 1973 (aged 85); Jackson, Mississippi
- Occupation: Architect
- Practice: Overstreet & Spencer; Noah Webster Overstreet; Overstreet & Town; Noah Webster Overstreet & Associates; Overstreet, Ware & Ware; Overstreet, Ware, Ware & Lewis

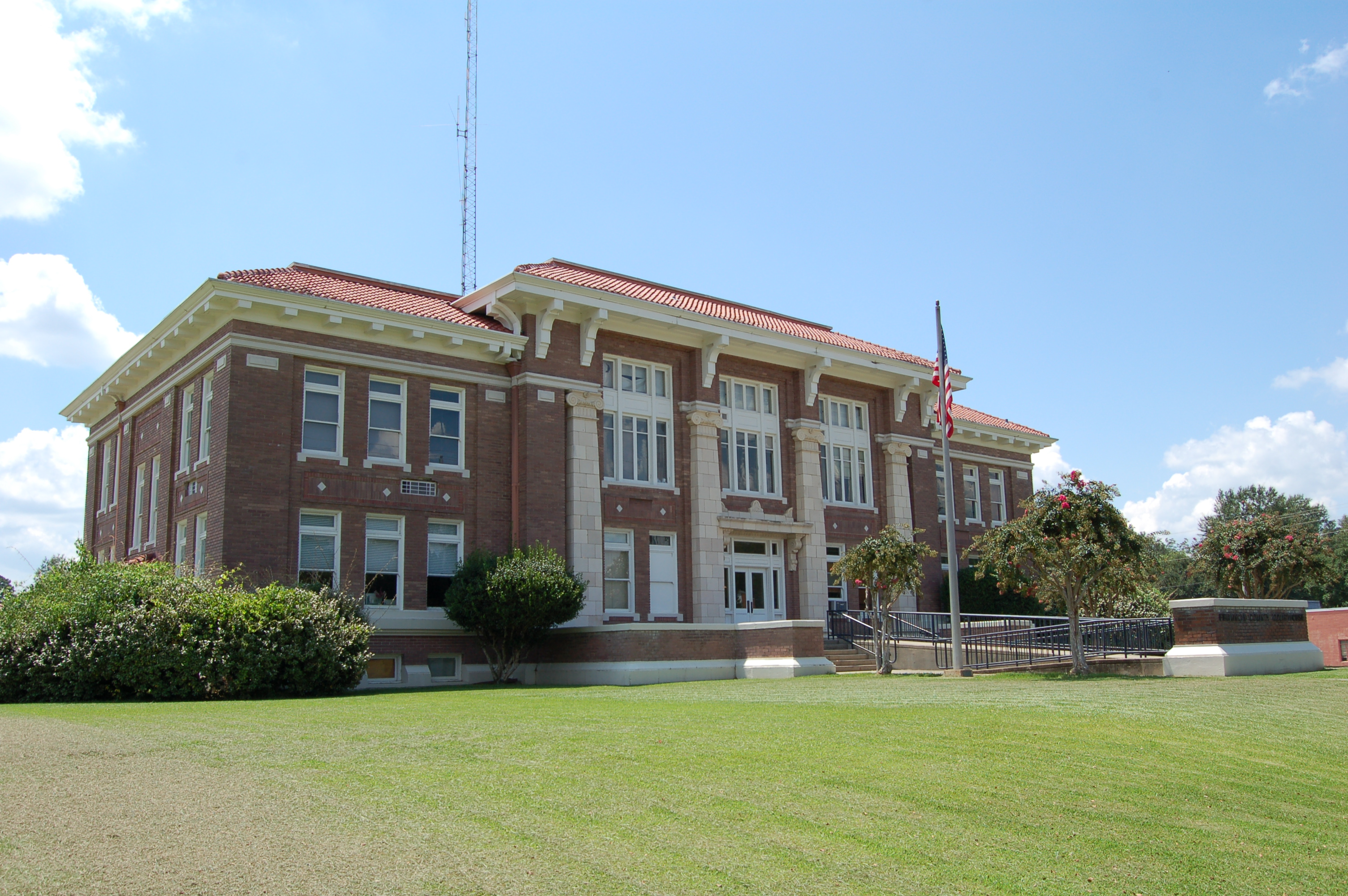
The Franklin County Courthouse in Meadville, completed in 1914.

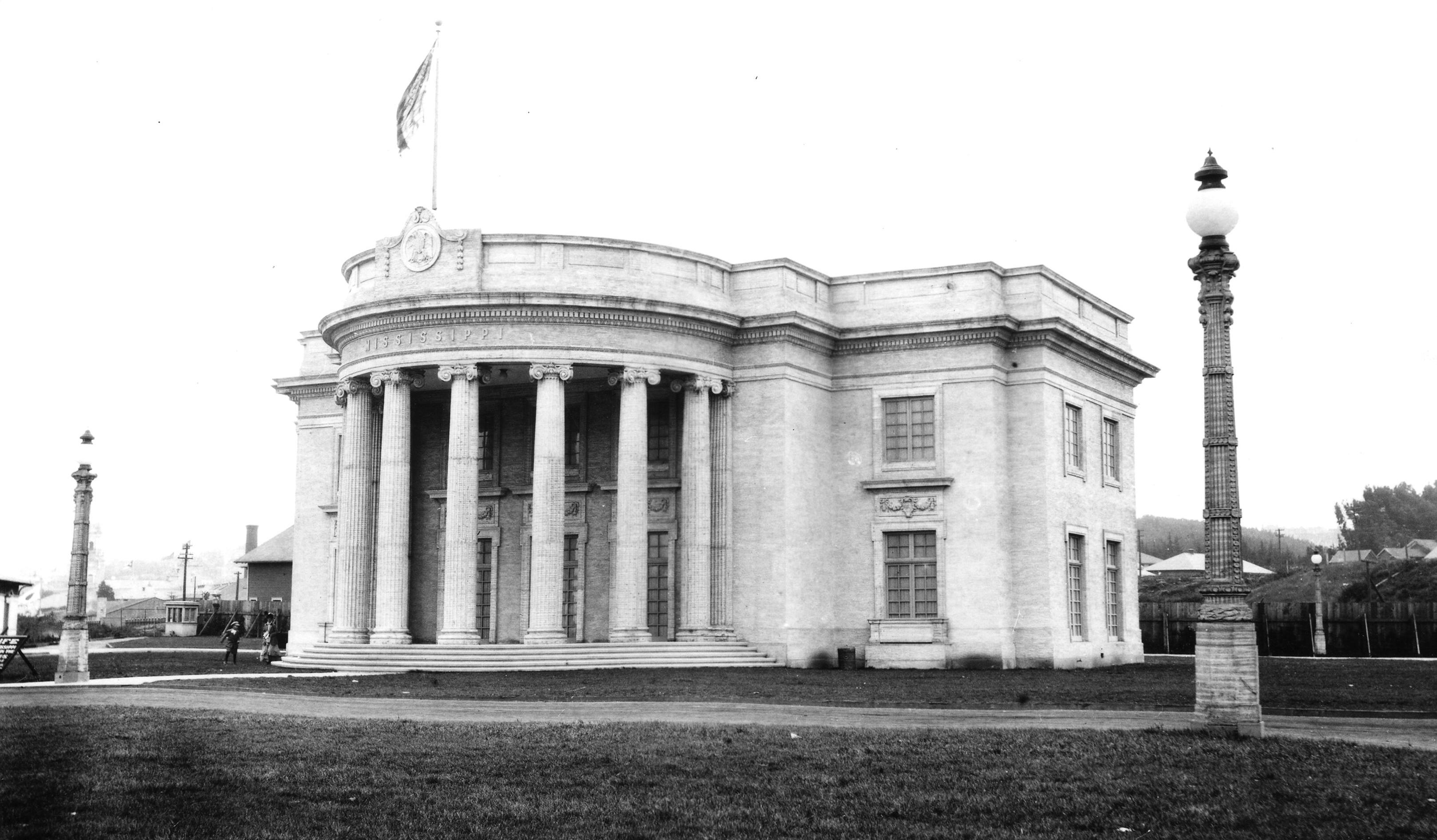
The Mississippi Building at the Panama–Pacific International Exposition, completed in 1915.

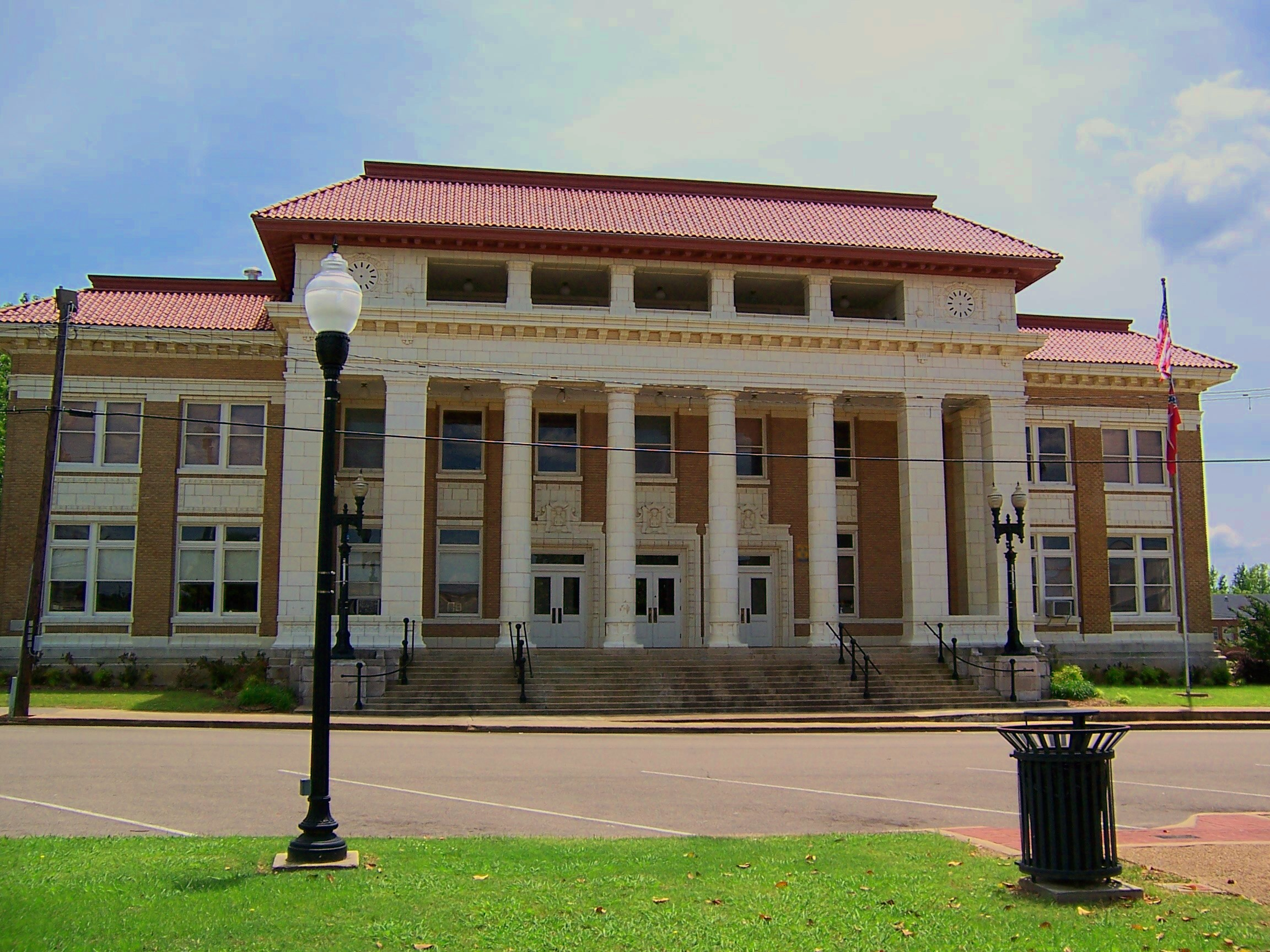
The Pontotoc County Courthouse in Pontotoc, completed in 1916.

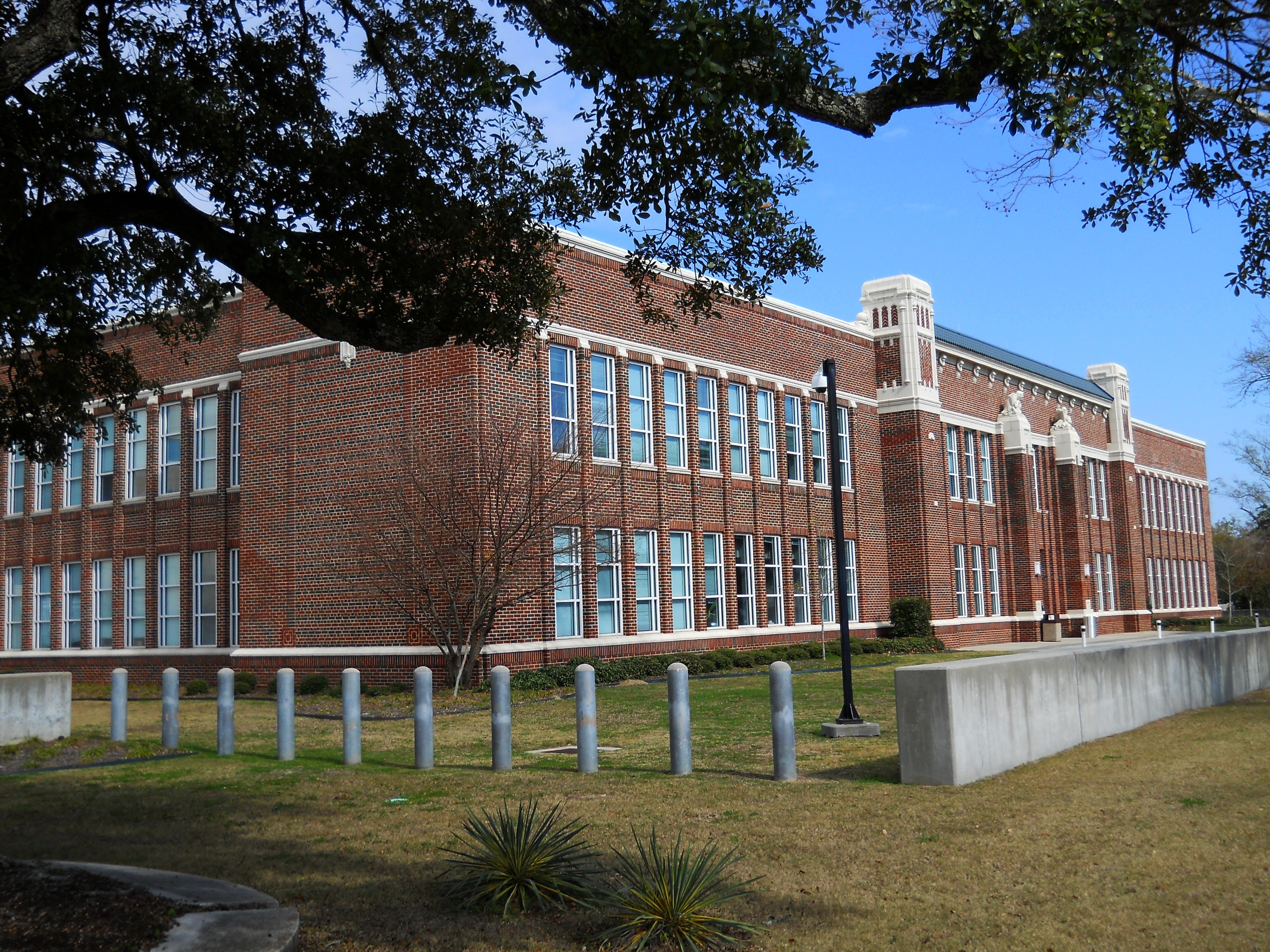
The former Gulfport High School, in Gulfport, completed in 1923.

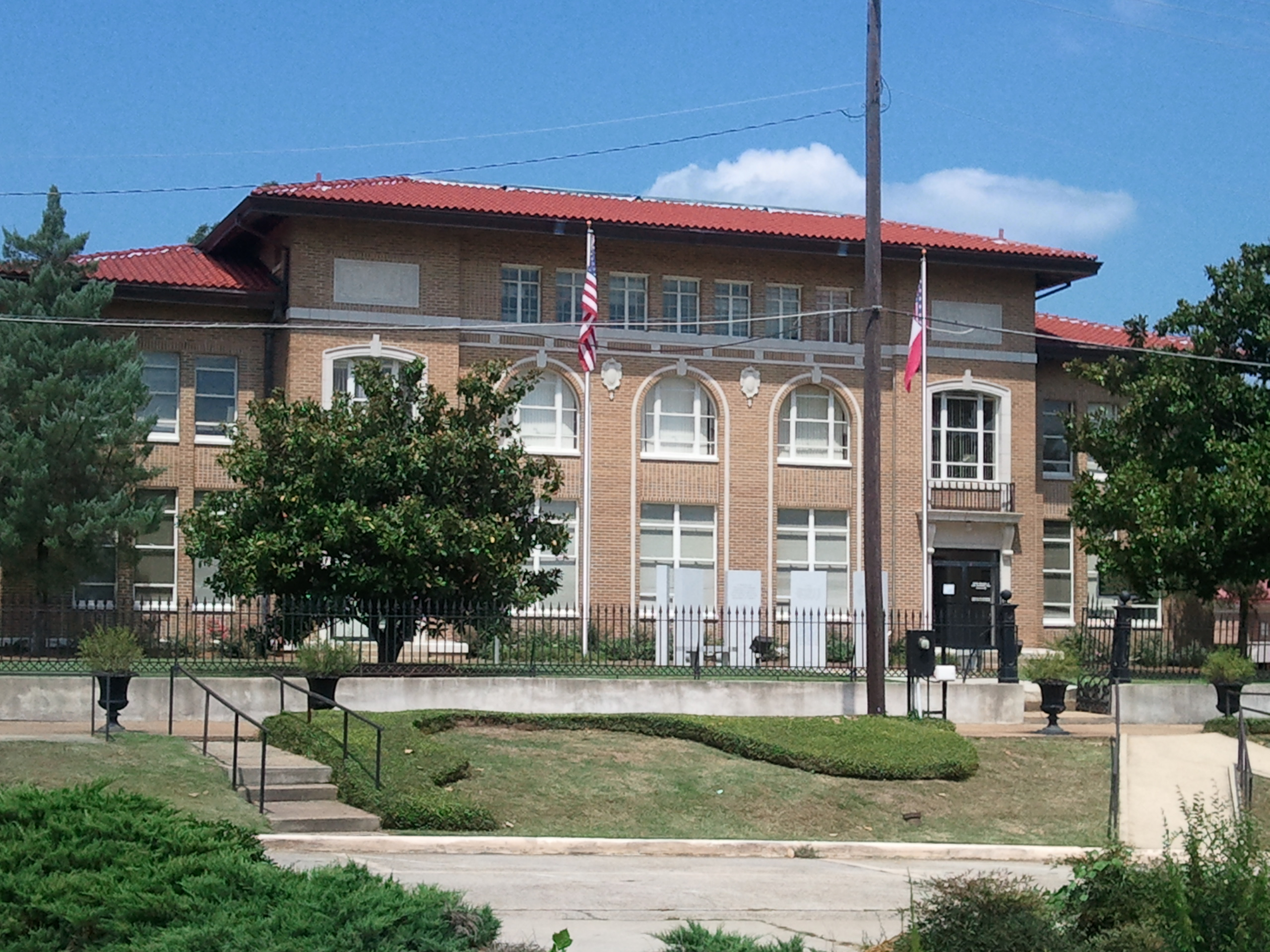
The Rankin County Courthouse in Brandon, completed in 1925.

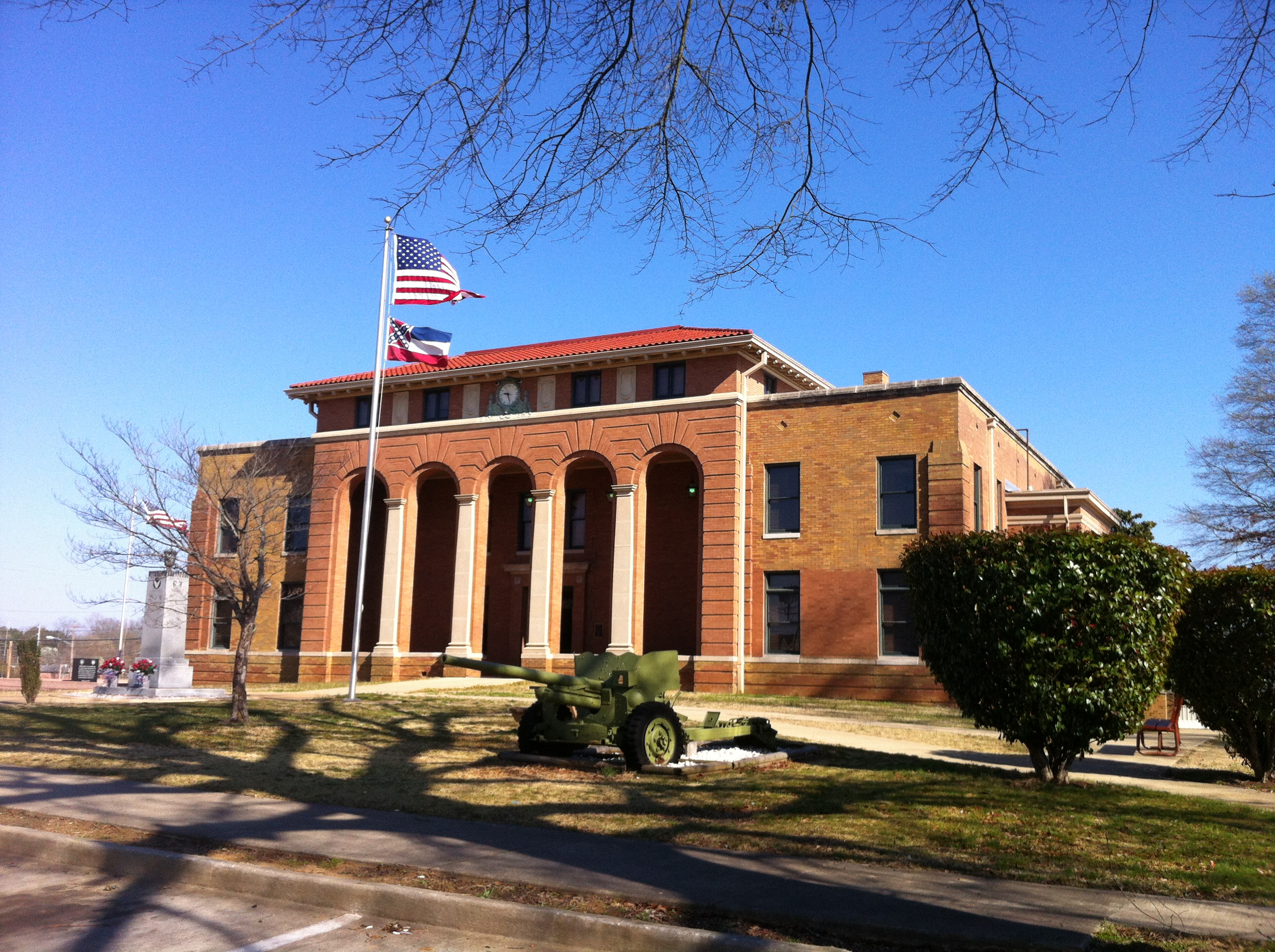
The Prentiss County Courthouse in Booneville, completed in 1926.

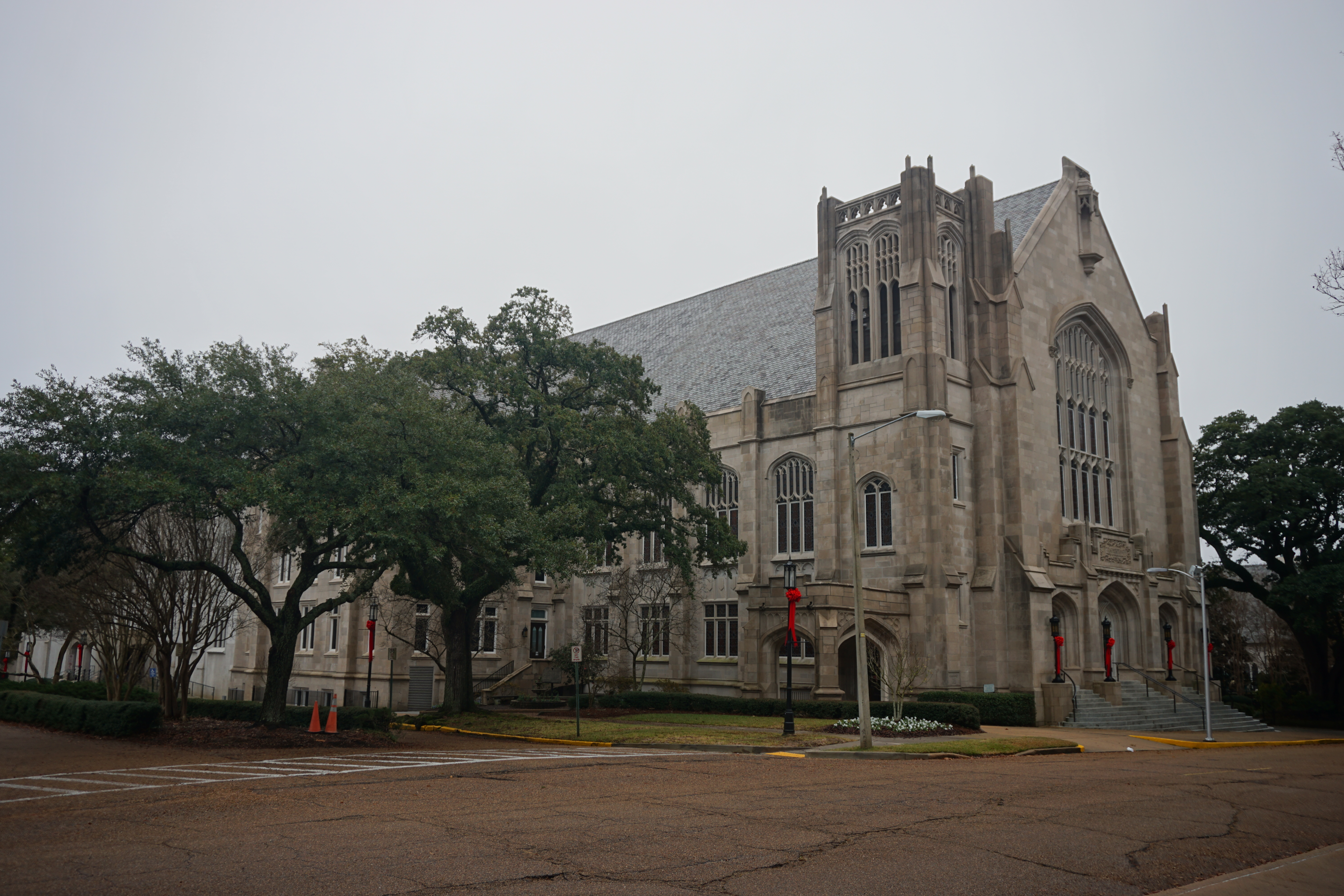
The First Baptist Church in Jackson, completed in 1927.

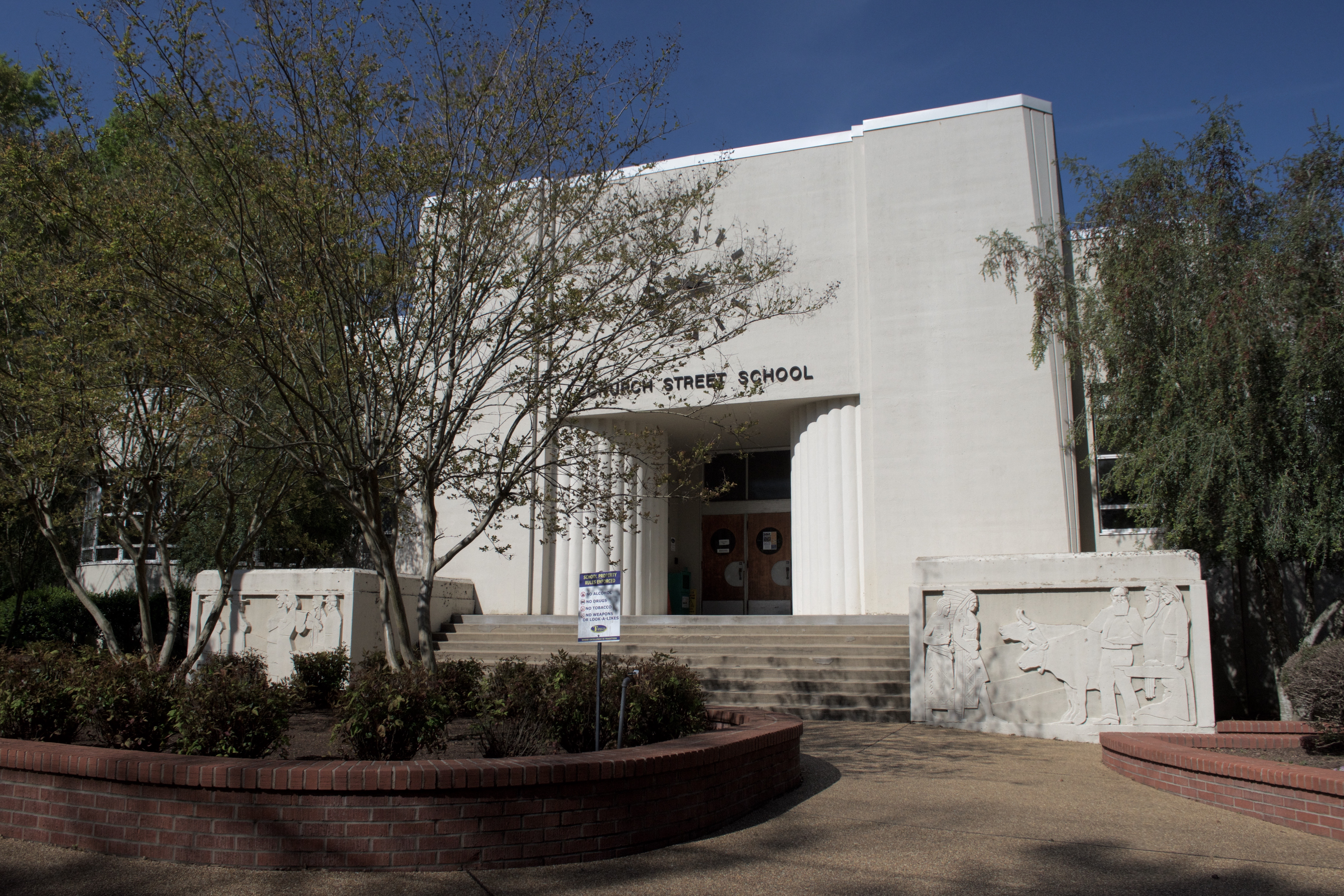
The North Church Primary School in Tupelo, completed in 1938.

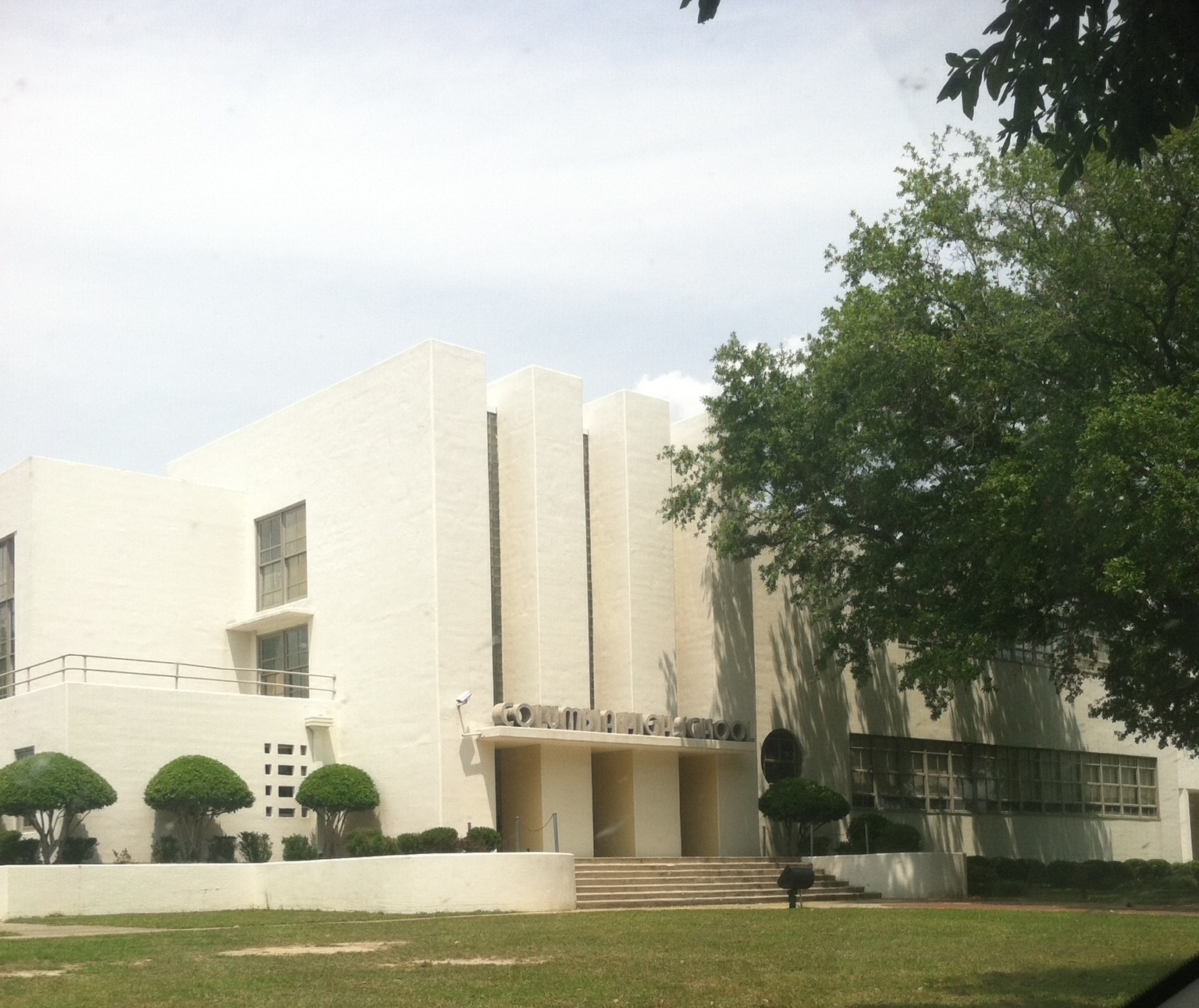
Columbia High School in Columbia, completed in 1938.

Noah Webster Overstreet FAIA (1888–1973) was an American architect in practice in Jackson, Mississippi from 1912 to 1968. He was a Fellow in the American Institute of Architects and received accolades for his career. According to the Mississippi Encyclopedia, few architects had as pronounced an impact on Jackson, Mississippi, the state capitol, in the early twentieth century as Overstreet who "worked for over fifty years, producing a large body of commanding institutional and large-scale commercial work."

== Life and career ==
Noah Webster Overstreet was born July 4, 1888, in Eastabuchie, Mississippi to Harvey Havard Overstreet and Bettie Flora Overstreet. He was educated in the Eastabuchie public school and at Mississippi State University before entering the architecture school of the University of Illinois with the class of 1910. Following graduation, he worked for two years in the office of Urbana, Illinois architect Joseph W. Royer.

In 1912 Overstreet moved back to Mississippi, settling in Jackson where he formed Overstreet & Spencer with Raymond B. Spencer. It lasted until they dissolved their partnership in 1914. Circa 1914 they briefly had a third partner and the firm was known as Overstreet, Spencer & Paine. After ending his partnership, Overstreet practiced independently in Jackson for about fifteen years. In 1931 he formed a new partnership, known as Overstreet & Town, with A. Hays Town. This was dissolved in 1939 when Town returned to his native state of Louisiana. This was succeeded by Noah Webster Overstreet & Associates which in turn was succeeded in 1955 by the firm of Overstreet, Ware & Ware with brothers Joseph T. Ware and John M. Ware. A fourth partner, Edwin R. Lewis, was added in 1962. Overstreet formally retired from the firm effective December 31, 1968, which was succeeded by the Ware, Lewis Partnership on January 1. It was later known as Ware, Lewis & Eaton and as the Lewis–Eaton Partnership. In 1969 it had been acquired by Reynolds, Smith & Hills of Jacksonville, Florida and was a subsidiary of that firm until its dissolution in 1985. The best known work of the successor firm is the Charlotte Capers Archives and History Building in Jackson, begun in 1969 and completed in 1971.

Overstreet joined the American Institute of Architects in 1922. He was instrumental in the founding of the Mississippi chapter in 1929 and served as its first president. In 1952 he was elected a Fellow of the American Institute of Architects, the first Mississippi architect to be so honored.

By the time of his election to fellowship Overstreet was the acknowledged leader of the architectural profession in Mississippi. He was well known as an architect of public and institutional buildings, including churches, courthouses and schools.

== Personal life ==
Overstreet married Mabel Kinnear in 1912 in Urbana. They had three children: Noah Webster Overstreet Jr., Robert Kinnear Overstreet and Patricia Ann (Overstreet) Kitchings. Robert K. Overstreet was also an architect and worked for his father in Jackson from 1946 to 1952 before moving to San Francisco. He was the partner of Elmer E. Botsai from 1963 to 1979.

In addition to his professional affiliations Overstreet was a member of the Chamber of Commerce, the Kappa Alpha Order and the Newcomen Society of the United States. He was a member of the Baptist church.

Overstreet died October 12, 1973, in Jackson at the age of 85.

== Legacy ==
Overstreet's work was concentrated in Mississippi, but he also designed buildings in Arkansas, Georgia and Louisiana. At least eight of his and his partners' works have been listed on the United States National Register of Historic Places, and others contribute to listed historic districts or are designated Mississippi Landmarks.

== Architectural works ==
- C. H. Parsons house, Crystal Springs, Mississippi (1912, NRHP 1984)
- Franklin County Courthouse, Meadville, Mississippi (1913–14, NRHP 1981)
- Jackson Public Library, Jackson, Mississippi (1913–14, demolished)
- YMCA Building, Mississippi State University, Starkville, Mississippi (1914–15)
- Mississippi Building, Panama–Pacific International Exposition, San Francisco, California (1915, temporary building demolished 1916)
- Webster County Courthouse, Walthall, Mississippi (1915–16, burned and demolished 2013)
- Harrison County Courthouse, Gulfport, Mississippi (1916–17, demolished)
- Pontotoc County Courthouse, (Note: Designed in association with Mahan & Broadwell of Memphis, Tennessee. A contributing property to the Pontotoc Historic District, NRHP-listed in 1993.) Pontotoc, Mississippi (1916)
- Alcorn County Courthouse, Corinth, Mississippi (1918–19)
- Remodeling of the First Presbyterian Church, (Note: Originally built in 1845. A contributing property to the Downtown Louisville Historic District, NRHP-listed in 2011.) Louisville, Mississippi (1920)
- Central Presbyterian Church (former), Jackson, Mississippi (1922)
- Inverness High School (former), Inverness, Mississippi (1922, demolished 2010)
- Shaw High School, Shaw, Mississippi (1922)
- Bolivar County Courthouse, (Note: A contributing property to the Downtown Cleveland Historic District, NRHP-listed in 1999.) Cleveland, Mississippi (1923–24)
- Canton High School, Canton, Mississippi (1923 and 1938, NRHP 1998)
- Gulfport High School (former), Gulfport, Mississippi (1923)
- Lamar Life Insurance Company Building, (Note: Designed in association with Sanguinet, Staats & Hedrick of Fort Worth, Texas.) (Note: A contributing property to the Smith Park Architectural District, NRHP-listed in 1976.) Jackson, Mississippi (1923–24)
- First Baptist Church, Jackson, Mississippi (1924–27)
- Mississippi Fire Insurance Company Building, (Note: Now a state office building named for Heber Austin Ladner.) Jackson, Mississippi (1924)
- Heber Ladner Building, Jackson, Mississippi (1924)
- Rankin County Courthouse, (Note: A contributing property to the Downtown Brandon Historic District, NRHP-listed in 2010.) Brandon, Mississippi (1924–25, NRHP 1997)
- Scott County Courthouse, Forest, Mississippi (1924, demolished 1955)
- Gordon Hotel, Albany, Georgia (1925)
- Hotel Chester, (Note: A contributing property to the Downtown Starkville Historic District, NRHP-listed in 2012.) Starkville, Mississippi (1925, NRHP 1985)
- Monticello Consolidated School, Monticello, Mississippi (1925–26, NRHP 1991)
- Prentiss County Courthouse, Booneville, Mississippi (1925–26)
- Additions to the Marshall County Courthouse, Holly Springs, Mississippi (1926)
- Winona High School, Winona, Mississippi (1926)
- George Hurst Building, University of Southern Mississippi, Hattiesburg, Mississippi (1927)
- Tippah County Courthouse, Ripley, Mississippi (1928)
- Plaza Building, Jackson, Mississippi (1929)
- Bloom's Arcade, Tallulah, Louisiana (1930, NRHP 1989)
- Lake Village Baptist Church, Lake Village, Arkansas (1931)
- North Church Primary School / Church Street School, Tupelo, Mississippi (1936–38, NRHP 1992)
- Columbia High School, Columbia, Mississippi (1937–38)
- Addition to the St. James Parish Courthouse, Convent, Louisiana (1939, burned and demolished 1970)
- Choctaw County Courthouse, Ackerman, Mississippi (1941)
- Columbia Primary School, (Note: A contributing property to the Columbia North Historic District, NRHP-listed in 2009.) Columbia, Mississippi (1951)
- George L. Hawkins Elementary School, (Note: Designed in association with Hearon & McCleskey of Hattiesburg. A contributing property to Boundary Increase II of the Hub City Historic District, NRHP-listed in 2012.) Hattiesburg, Mississippi (1951)
- Fondren Corner, (Note: A contributing property to the Downtown Fondren Historic District, NRHP-listed in 2014.) Jackson, Mississippi (1955–56)
- Terminal, (Note: Designed in association with John L. Turner & Associates of Jackson.) Jackson–Medgar Wiley Evers International Airport, Jackson, Mississippi (1959–63, altered)
- Alexander Hall, Jackson State University, Jackson, Mississippi (1960–63)
- University Baptist Church, Hattiesburg, Mississippi (1960)
