= Elmer E. Botsai =

American architect (1928–2013)

- Born: February 1, 1928; St. Louis
- Died: August 28, 2013 (aged 85); Honolulu
- Occupation: Architect
- Awards: Fellow of the American Institute of Architects (1974)
- Practice: Botsai, Overstreet Associates; Botsai, Overstreet & Rosenberg

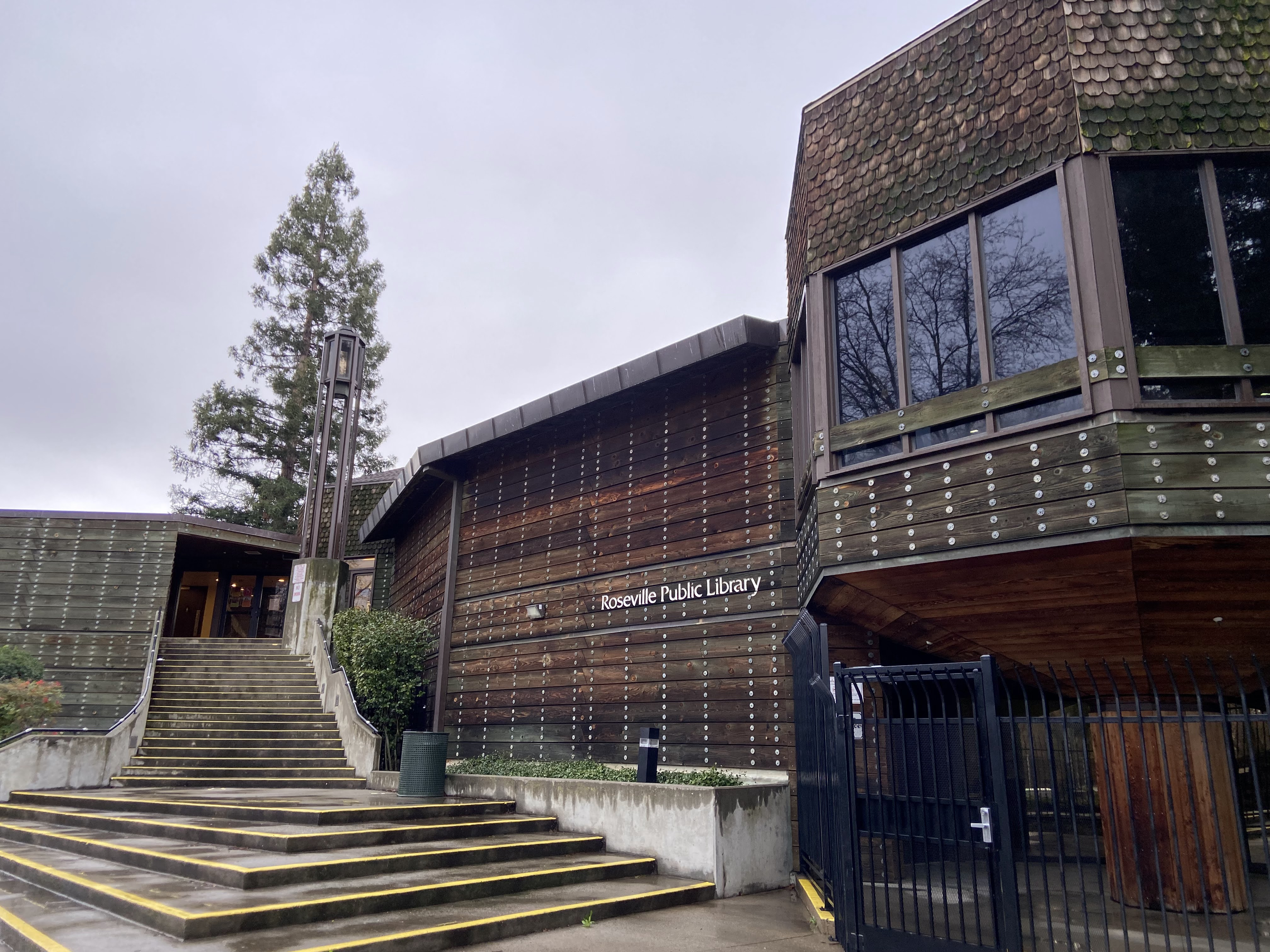
The Downtown Library in Roseville, California, designed by Botsai, Overstreet & Rosenberg and completed in 1979.

Elmer E. Botsai DArch FAIA (1928–2011) was an American architect and architectural educator. Botsai was in practice in San Francisco from 1963 to 1979, was dean of the School of Architecture at the University of Hawaiʻi at Mānoa from 1980 to 1990 and was president of the American Institute of Architects for the year 1978.

== Life and career ==
Elmer Eugene Botsai was born February 1, 1928, in St. Louis to Paul Botsai and Ita May (Cole) Botsai. He was raised in Roseville, California, where he attended the public schools. He served in the United States Army from 1946 to 1948. He earned an AA degree from the Sacramento City College in 1950 and a BA from the University of California, Berkeley in 1954. Remaining in San Francisco, he worked as a drafter and architect's assistant for the Southern Pacific until 1957, when he joined Anshen & Allen as a project architect. In 1963 he left to open his own office, Botsai, Overstreet Associates, with Robert K. Overstreet. Overstreet was the son of Mississippi architect Noah Webster Overstreet and a student of Bruce Goff. In 1974 the firm became Botsai, Overstreet & Rosenberg with the addition of Allen F. Rosenberg.

Though established as a conventional architectural firm, Botsai and his partners quickly came to specialize in troubleshooting and analyzing building failures, especially those of the building envelope. Circa 1971 they were retained by engineer Henry J. Degenkolb as a consultant to examine water infiltration issues in One Embarcadero Center, and on those grounds were retained by the building's architect, John Portman & Associates, as a preventive consultant on later phases of the Embarcadero Center project. This became the major focus of the firm's work. Conventional design projects completed by Botsai, Overstreet Associates and Botsai, Overstreet & Rosenberg include:

- Bear Valley Lodge, 265 Bear Valley Rd, Bear Valley, California (1967)
- Mausoleum 3, Italian Cemetery, Colma, California (1974)
- Roseville Public Library–Downtown, 225 Taylor St, Roseville, California (1979)
- Mausoleum 4A, Italian Cemetery, Colma, California (1981)

Through Overstreet, the influence of Bruce Goff permeates many of these works.

In 1976 Botsai was appointed chair of the department of architecture of the University of Hawaiʻi at Mānoa, but remained senior partner of his San Francisco firm until 1979. He became dean in 1980 when the department was elevated to School status. He stepped down as dean in 1990 but remained a professor until 1999. In 2000 he was awarded a Doctor of Architecture (DArch) degree from the university and was named professor emeritus. He was one of the first people to be awarded a DArch, and then as now the University of Hawai'i is the only American university to offer it. From 1998 he was also a consultant to Group 70 International, one of the largest architecture firms in Hawai'i.

Botsai joined the American Institute of Architects (AIA) in 1963 as a member of the Northern California, now San Francisco, chapter. He served in several chapter and national roles before being elected AIA treasurer for 1972 and 1973 and then as vice president for 1975 and 1976. His candidacy for vice president was opposed by the women members of the AIA for his past opposition to hiring women architects, though by 1974 he claimed to regret his prior views. He continued to advance through the ranks, and in 1976 was elected first vice president/president elect for 1977 and president for 1978. He was the first, and so far only, Hawai'i resident and the first academic to serve as president. During his presidency Botsai was a vocal proponent of professional competency and continuing education. After his presidency he was formally transferred to the Hawai'i chapter, in which he held several leadership roles. Botsai was elected a fellow of the AIA in 1974 and was later elected to honorary membership in the Society of Architects of Mexico, the Royal Architectural Institute of Canada, the New Zealand Institute of Architects and the Australian Institute of Architects.

== Personal life ==
Botsai was married in 1955 to Patricia L. Keegan, and they had two children, both sons. After a divorce he remarried to Sharon L. Kaiser and had one additional child, a daughter. Botsai died August 28, 2013, in Honolulu at the age of 85.

== Legacy ==
When he retired in 1979, Botsai's San Francisco firm was known as Botsai, Overstreet & Rosenberg. Since then it has been known as Overstreet, Rosenberg & Gray, Rosenberg McGinnis and, since 2000, as McGinnis Chen Associates.

== Published works ==
- W. Wayne Wilcox, Elmer E. Botsai and Hans Kubler, Wood as a Building Material: A Guide for Designers and Builders (New York: John Wiley & Sons, 1991)
- Elmer E. Botsai, Charles Kaneshiro, Phil Cuccia and Hiram Pajo, The Architect's Guide to Preventing Water Infiltration (New York: John Wiley & Sons, 2010)
