= Dan M. Russell Jr. United States Courthouse =

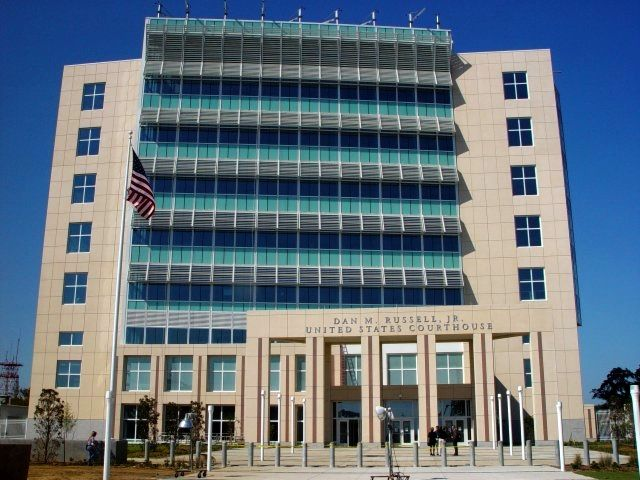

- Location within Mississippi Location within the United States

General information
- Location: 2012 15th Street, Gulfport, Mississippi 39501
- Coordinates: 30.3697°N 89.0872°W
- Groundbreaking: August 2001
- Completed: August 2003
- Opened: November 14, 2003
- Cost: $46 million
- Owner: General Services Administration

Height
- Height: 159 feet (48 m)

Technical details
- Floor count: 8
- Floor area: 180,000 square feet (17,000 m^{2}) in new construction, 37,000 square feet (3,400 m^{2}) in renovation
- Grounds: 6.7 acres (2.7 ha)

Design and construction
- Architecture firm: Canizaro Cawthon Davis Architects (architect of record); Kliment Halsband Architects (design architects)
- Main contractor: Roy Anderson Corporation (general contractor)

Other information
- Parking: 150 spaces

Website
- United States District Court, Southern District of Mississippi

The Dan M. Russell Jr. United States Courthouse is a 6.7-acre (2.7 ha) complex located in Gulfport, Mississippi to serve the Southern District of Mississippi. The courthouse tower was named in honor of United States district judge Dan M. Russell Jr. (b. 1913 – d. 2011). The complex includes the 8-story Dan M. Russell Courthouse and the adjacent 1923 Gulfport High School that was renovated to serve as judicial offices.

== Courthouse tower ==
Construction of the 8-story Dan M. Russell Courthouse began in 2001 and was completed in 2003. The main entrance to the tower's lobby is at the south facade which faces the Mississippi Sound. The second floor is the mezzanine which serves as an assembly area for juries. Three of the tower's outer walls were constructed of precast concrete. The building is generally symmetrical on the north- and south-facing facades, but the west facade is wider than the east facade. To enhance natural lighting within the building, the outer wall for the upper six floors of the south facade was constructed of "faceted curtain-wall window bays".

The third and fourth floors of the tower were designed for offices to accommodate the United States Marshals Service and the clerk of the district court. On floors 5 through 8, the building design included jury rooms, chambers for judges, and 8 courtrooms:

- 4 District courts
- 2 Magistrate courts
- 2 Bankpruptcy courts

=== Courthouse annex ===
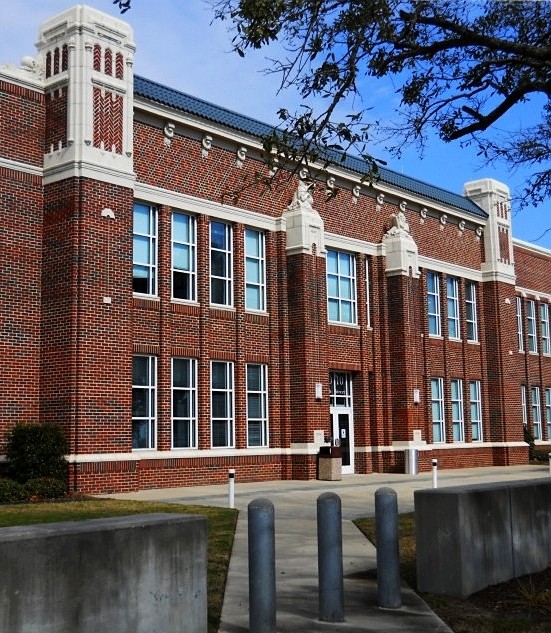
Courthouse annex

As part of the courthouse complex, the adjacent 1923 Gulfport High School building was renovated for use by the U. S. Attorney for the Southern District of Mississippi and federal probation services.

== Courthouse grounds ==
The courthouse tower and annex are situated on 6.7 acres (2.7 ha). A park-like plaza extends 243 feet (74 m) from the street to the main entrance of the courthouse tower. Southern live oaks (Quercus virginiana), dating from the 1923 school property, dot the landscape. A large theater at the center of the old school building was replaced with a landscaped courtyard. Parking areas to accommodate 140 to 150 vehicles are located on the east and north portions of the acreage. A separate service building at the northeast corner of the property houses a chilled-water cooling system and a gas-fired-boiler heating system.
