= Rankin County Confederate Monument =

- U.S. National Register of Historic Places
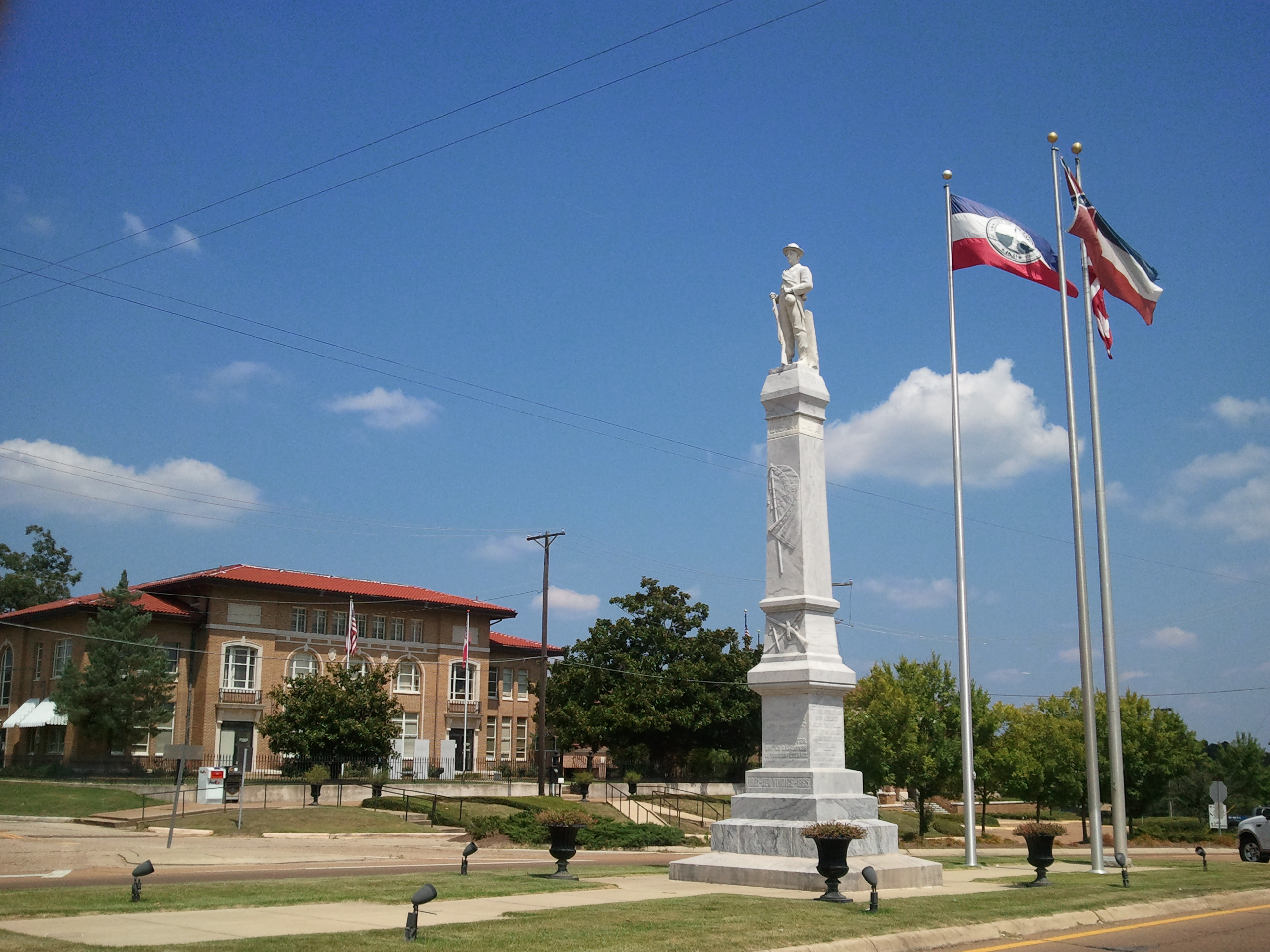
- Confederate monument with Rankin County Courthouse in background

- Location within Mississippi Location within the United States
- Nearest city: Brandon, Mississippi
- Coordinates: 32.273132°N 89.9868029°W
- NRHP reference No.: 97000797
- Added to NRHP: August 1, 1997

The Rankin County Confederate Monument is a war memorial located on the downtown square of Brandon, Mississippi, at the intersection of Government and North streets. The monument was erected in 1907 by the Brandon Chapter of the United Daughters of the Confederacy. The monument was listed on the National Register of Historic Places on August 1, 1997.

== Description ==
The monument is 37 feet tall in total. A seven foot tall granite statue of a Confederate soldier, facing west in a lookout posture, stands atop a marble pillar and stepped base. Below the statue, on the west side of the pillar, is a relief of a crossed rifle, bayonet and sword. The base is inscribed with poetry.

=== Inscriptions ===
Inscriptions of poetry are featured on each side of the square base. The inscriptions are in all capital letters. The poetry is unattributed. Aside from poetic verse, there is also an inscription attributing the local chapter of the United Daughters of the Confederacy as having erected the monument, as well as E.J. Martin, grand master of a local Masonic organization, as having laid the cornerstone.

- North face- "States' rights and home rule truth crushed to the Earth will rise again. Men die, principles live forever. Although conquered we adore it; weep for those who fell before it; pardon for those who trailed and tore it."
- South face- "Love's tribute to the noble men who marched neath the folds of the 'Stars and Bars' and who were faithful to the end. / 'Under the sod & dew, waiting for the judgment day.'"
- East face- "To those who wore the grey, in legend and in lay our heroes in grey, shall forever live over again for us. / The epitaph of the soldier who falls with his country, is written in the hearts of those who love the right and honor the brave."
- West face- "Lord God of Hosts be with us yet lest we forget, lest we forget."

== Historical context ==
According to the NRHP application's narrative statement of historical significance, "Local tradition holds that 'the monument marks the spot where General Sherman ordered his troops to stack arms during the siege of Brandon....'" The monument is an example of many similar monuments erected in southern parks and squares during a period postbellum resurgence in regional identity that occurred from approximately 1870 until the first World War. The Rankin County Confederate Monument differs from other, similar monuments in that it is oriented to face west, toward the direction where Union troops entered town during the Siege of Brandon. Most other such monuments are oriented to face toward the north.

The monument's dedication took place on September 29, 1907. Daisy McLaurin Stevens, the President of the United Daughters of the Confederacy's Mississippi Division, she gave an speech at the event.
