= Avalon Morningside Park =

Luxury apartment building in Manhattan, New York

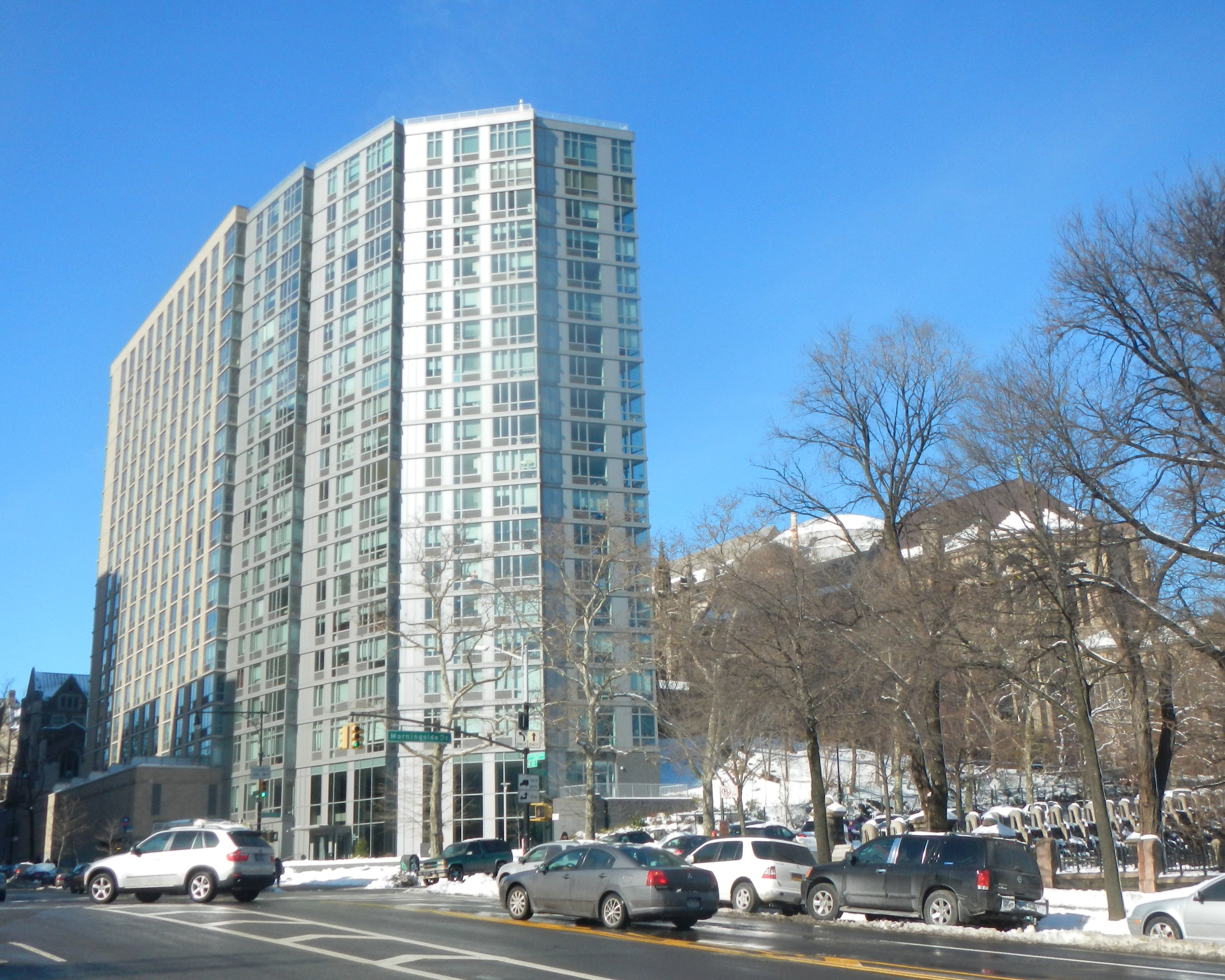
- Interactive map of the Avalon Morningside Park area

General information
- Type: Apartments
- Location: 1 Morningside Dr; New York, NY 10025, United States
- Coordinates: 40°48′08″N 73°57′41″W
- Completed: 2007; 19 years ago
- Operator: Vivmark Residential

Website
- www.avaloncommunities.com/new-york/new-york-city-apartments/avalon-morningside-park/

Avalon Morningside Park is a 20-story glass luxury apartment building in the Morningside Heights neighborhood of Manhattan, near Morningside Park. It was constructed in 2007 on land that formerly constituted a portion of the cathedral close of the Cathedral of St. John the Divine.

The land was at first subject to a ground lease. In December 2017, the land was sold by the Episcopal Diocese of New York to the owner of the apartment complex for $95 million.
