= Arcadia University, Pennsylvania =

Unincorporated community in Pennsylvania, US

Arcadia University
- Census-designated place Neighborhood of Cheltenham Township
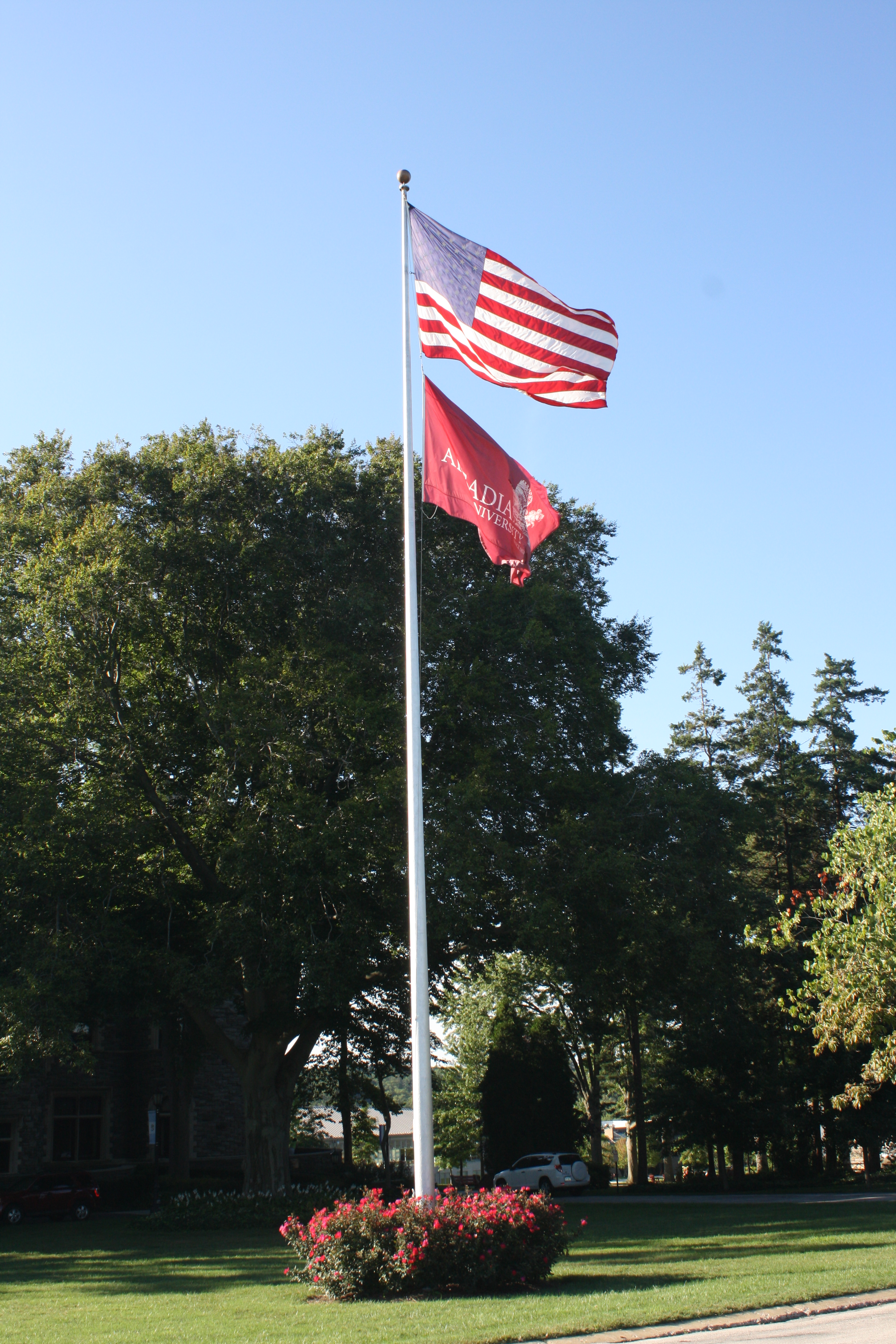
- Flag at Arcadia University

- Location of Arcadia University in Pennsylvania Arcadia University (the United States)
- Coordinates: 40°05′28″N 75°09′51″W
- Country: United States
- State: Pennsylvania
- County: Montgomery
- Township: Cheltenham

Area
  - Total: 0.10 sq mi (0.26 km^{2})
  - Land: 0.10 sq mi (0.26 km^{2})
  - Water: 0 sq mi (0.00 km^{2})
- Elevation: 317 ft (97 m)

Population (2020)
  - Total: 758
  - Density: 7,436.7/sq mi (2,871.34/km^{2})
- Time zone: UTC-5 (Eastern Standard Time)
  - Summer (DST): UTC-4 (Eastern Daylight Time)
- Zip Code: 19038
- Area codes: 215, 267 and 445
- FIPS code: 42-02826

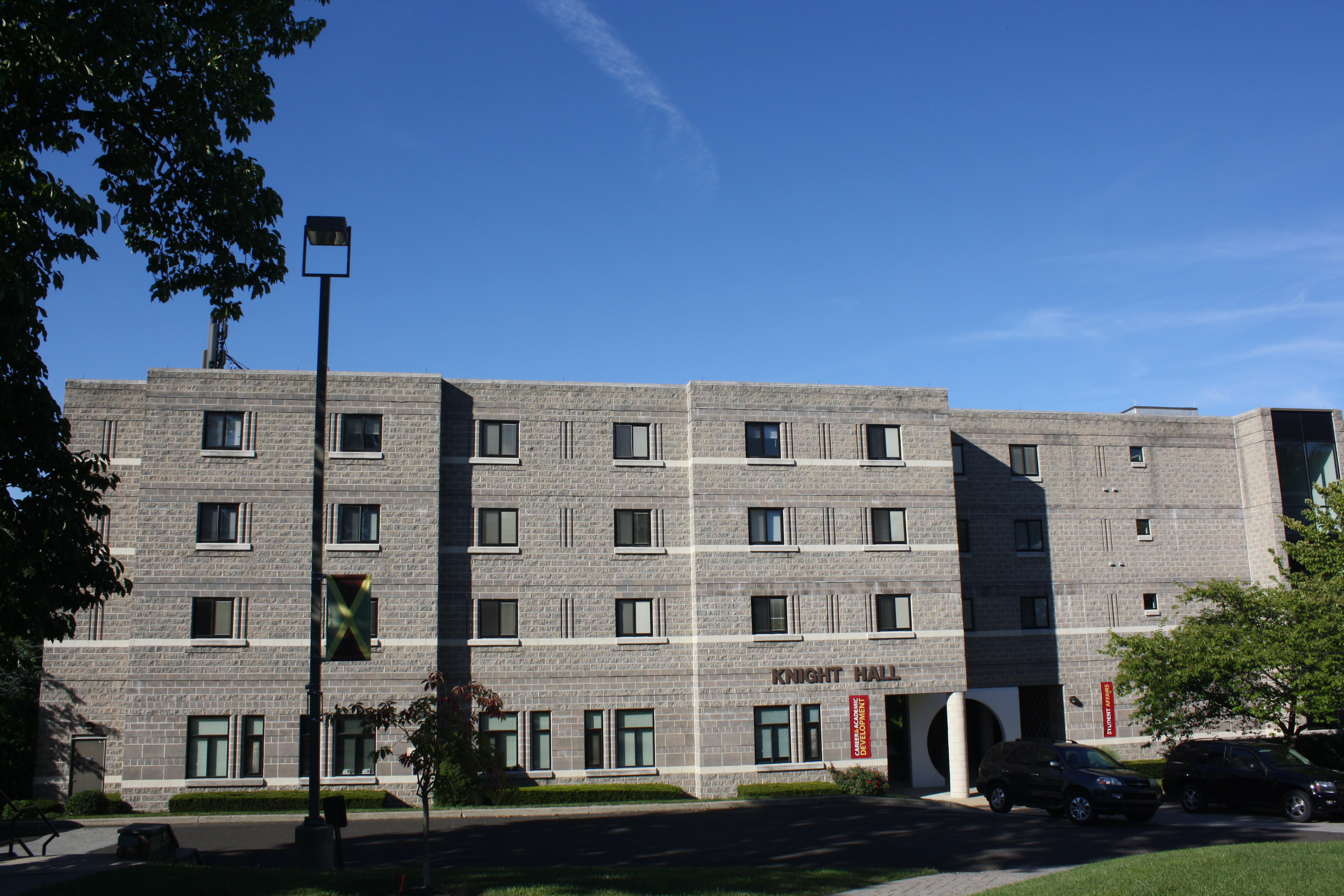
Knight Hall at Arcardia University

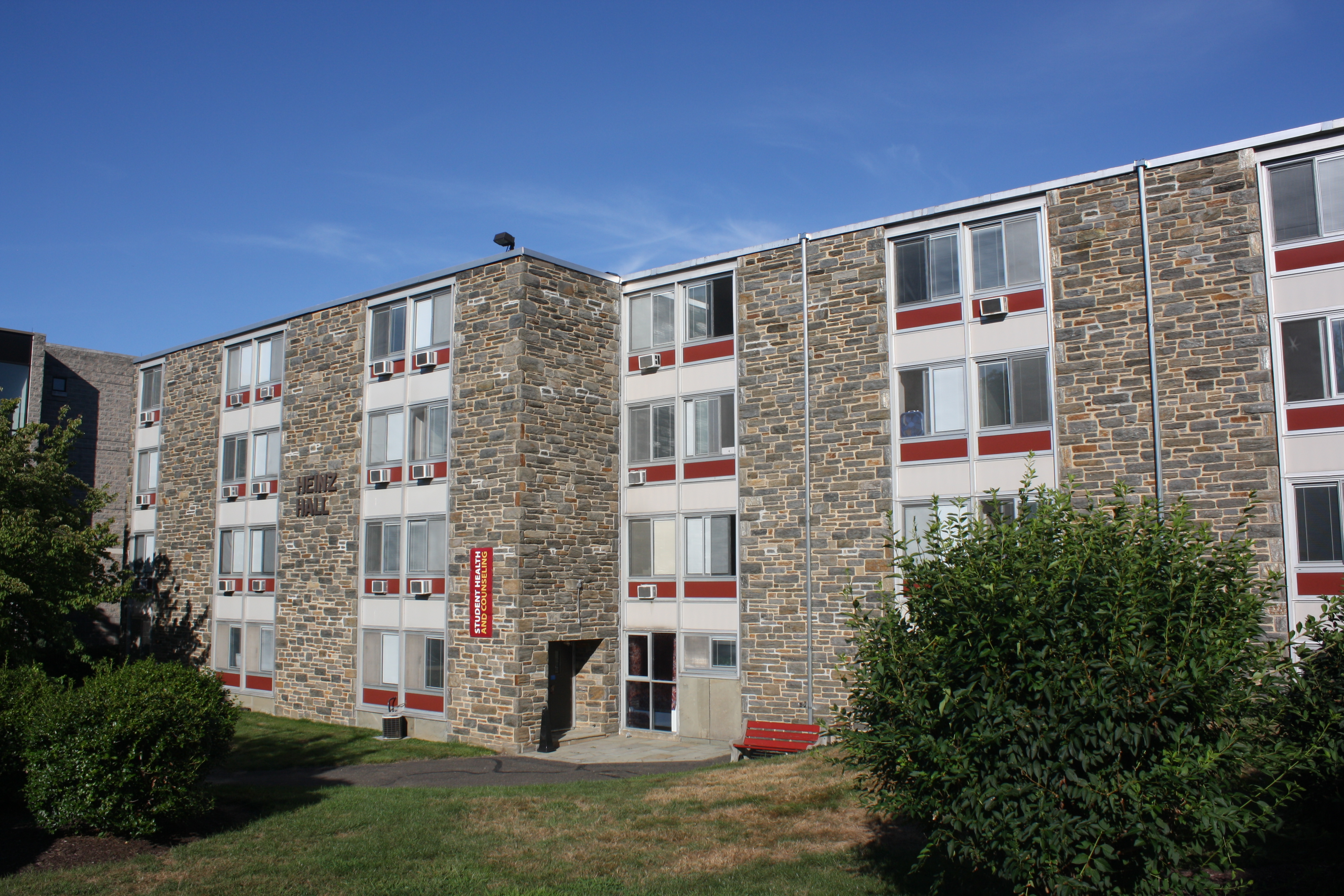
Heinz Hall at Arcardia University

Arcadia University is a census-designated place located in Cheltenham Township, Montgomery County, Pennsylvania. It is located just off campus at Arcadia University and off Pennsylvania Route 309. As of the 2020 census, Arcadia University had a population of 758.

With 10,438 people per square mile, Arcadia University is the most densely populated census-designated place in Montgomery County and 33rd most densely populated census-designated place in the U.S. It is one of only two places in Montgomery County that has over 10,000 people per square mile (the other is Conshohocken). This is attributed to the land area consisting mostly of college dormitories.

Arcadia University is home to National Historic Landmark Grey Towers Castle which serves as the main administration building for Arcadia University.

== Demographics ==
Historical population
Census	Pop.	Note	%±
2020	758		—
U.S. Decennial Census
