= National Register of Historic Places listings in Hinds County, Mississippi =

Location of Hinds County in Mississippi

This is a list of the National Register of Historic Places listings in Hinds County, Mississippi.

This is intended to be a complete list of the properties and districts on the National Register of Historic Places in Hinds County, Mississippi, United States. Latitude and longitude coordinates are provided for many National Register properties and districts; these locations may be seen together in a map.

There are 129 properties and districts listed on the National Register in the county, including 5 National Historic Landmarks. Another 4 properties were once listed but have been removed.

This National Park Service list is complete through NPS recent listings posted October 2, 2026.

== Current listings ==
	Name on the Register	Image	Date listed	Location	City or town	Description
1	505-507-509 North Farish Street		July 30, 2024 (#100010598)	505-507-509 North Farish Street; 32°18′18″N 90°11′19″W	Jackson	
2	Admiral Benbow Inn	Admiral Benbow Inn	September 18, 2020 (#100005613)	905 North State St. 32°18′37″N 90°10′42″W	Jackson	
3	Ayer Hall	Ayer Hall	July 14, 1977 (#77000788)	1400 Lynch St. on the Jackson State University campus 32°17′45″N 90°12′27″W	Jackson	
4	Bailey Hill Civil War Earthworks	Bailey Hill Civil War Earthworks	May 6, 1975 (#75001044)	Off U.S. Route 51; 32°16′27″N 90°11′57″W	Jackson	
5	Baldwin's Ferry Mound		September 24, 1998 (#98001158)	Address restricted	Newman	
6	Bardin Mound (22-Hi-537)		March 1, 1987 (#87000130)	Address restricted	Coxs Ferry	
7	Belhaven Heights Historic District	Belhaven Heights Historic District	November 25, 1983 (#83003958)	Bellevue Place, N. Jefferson, Madison, and Morningside Sts.; also roughly bounded by Fortification, North, Monroe, and Spenglar Sts. 32°18′33″N 90°10′28″W	Jackson	Second set of boundaries represents a boundary increase of September 3, 1998
8	Belhaven Historic District	Belhaven Historic District	December 19, 2012 (#12000920)	Roughly bounded by E. Fortification, & N. State Sts., I-55, & Riverside Dr. 32°19′03″N 90°10′04″W	Jackson	
9	Bellevue Court Apartments	Bellevue Court Apartments	November 21, 1994 (#94001336)	950 North St. 32°18′39″N 90°10′33″W	Jackson	
10	Berry Mound and Village Archeological Site		November 25, 1969 (#69000088)	Address restricted	Terry	
11	Big Black River Battlefield	Big Black River Battlefield	November 23, 1971 (#71000451)	On both banks of the Big Black River between Smith's Station and Bovina; 32°21′36″N 90°43′35″W	Smith's Station	Site of the Battle of Big Black River Bridge; extends into Warren County
12	Big Black River Railroad Bridge	Big Black River Railroad Bridge	November 16, 1988 (#88002418)	Spans the Big Black River east of Bovina; 32°20′49″N 90°42′17″W	Edwards	Extends into Warren County
13	Lillian Boteler House		July 15, 1986 (#86001703)	214 Port Gibson Rd. 32°15′28″N 90°25′27″W	Raymond	
14	Building at 733 North State Street	Building at 733 North State Street	September 7, 2021 (#100006899)	733 North State St. 32°18′27″N 90°10′44″W	Jackson	
15	Byram Bridge	Byram Bridge	May 23, 1979 (#79003427)	Old Byram and Florence Rd. 32°10′35″N 90°14′37″W	Byram	Extends into Rankin County
16	Calvary Baptist Church	Calvary Baptist Church	May 14, 2013 (#13000301)	1300 W. Capitol St. 32°18′31″N 90°12′09″W	Jackson	
17	Capitol Green	Capitol Green	November 25, 1969 (#69000083)	Bounded on the north by Amite St., on the south by Pearl St., on the west by State St., and on the east by the Gulf, Mobile and Ohio railroad line 32°17′56″N 90°10′47″W	Jackson	The green includes the War Memorial Building, and a Confederate memorial.
18	Casey Elementary School		January 25, 2018 (#100002029)	2101 Lake Cir. 32°20′36″N 90°08′28″W	Jackson	
19	Castle Crest	Castle Crest	March 22, 2010 (#10000131)	114 Woodland Circle; 32°20′10″N 90°10′13″W	Jackson	
20	John F. Cates House	John F. Cates House	May 16, 1985 (#85001076)	Mississippi Highway 22; 32°27′06″N 90°25′13″W	Brownsville	
21	The Cedars	The Cedars	January 4, 1977 (#77000787)	405 E. College St. 32°20′14″N 90°19′26″W	Clinton	
22	Central Fire Station	Central Fire Station	October 30, 1975 (#75001045)	S. President St. 32°17′53″N 90°10′55″W	Jackson	
23	Chambliss Building	Chambliss Building	March 22, 2004 (#04000219)	932 Lynch St. 32°17′57″N 90°12′03″W	Jackson	
24	Champion Hill Battlefield	Champion Hill Battlefield	October 7, 1971 (#71000450)	4 miles southwest of Bolton; 32°19′12″N 90°32′33″W	Bolton vicinity	
25	City Hall	City Hall	November 25, 1969 (#69000084)	203 S. President St. 32°17′52″N 90°10′56″W	Jackson	
26	City Mound (22Hi672)		December 1, 1988 (#88002703)	Address restricted	Jackson	
27	Clinton Olde Towne Historic District		January 12, 2017 (#100000537)	Bounded by Belmont, East, College & Capitol/West Sts. 32°20′22″N 90°19′50″W	Clinton	
28	Downtown Fondren Historic District	Downtown Fondren Historic District	September 10, 2014 (#14000566)	Roughly along N. State St., Old Canton Rd., Duling Ave. & Fondren Pl. 32°20′07″N 90°10′32″W	Jackson	
29	Dupree House		January 31, 1979 (#79001314)	West of Raymond on Dupree Rd. 32°15′21″N 90°30′25″W	Raymond	
30	Dupree Mound and Village Archeological Site		November 25, 1969 (#69000082)	Address restricted	Edwards	
31	Dupree-Ratliff House	Dupree-Ratliff House	July 15, 1986 (#86001704)	101 Dupree St. 32°15′43″N 90°25′33″W	Raymond	
32	East Clinton Historic District	East Clinton Historic District	July 11, 1997 (#97000631)	Roughly bounded by the Illinois Central railroad tracks, E. College, Landrum, E. Main, and New Prospect Sts. 32°20′16″N 90°19′50″W	Clinton	
33	East Midtown Historic District		September 16, 2022 (#100008166)	Roughly bounded by Adelle, North West, Nearview, and Blair Sts. 32°18′57″N 90°11′04″W	Jackson	
34	Edwards Hotel	Edwards Hotel	November 7, 1976 (#76001096)	Capitol and Mill Sts. 32°17′59″N 90°11′25″W	Jackson	
35	Medgar Evers Historic District	Medgar Evers Historic District	September 18, 2013 (#13000737)	Roughly Margaret Walker Alexander St., W. of Missouri & E. of Miami Sts. 32°20′27″N 90°12′39″W	Jackson	
36	Medgar and Myrlie Evers Home National Monument	Medgar and Myrlie Evers Home National Monument	December 5, 2000 (#00001459)	2332 Margaret Walker Alexander Dr. 32°20′28″N 90°12′46″W	Jackson	
37	Meyer and Genevieve Falk House		February 23, 2021 (#100006163)	2037 Eastbourne Pl. 32°20′30″N 90°08′19″W	Jackson	
38	Farish Street Neighborhood Historic District	Farish Street Neighborhood Historic District	March 13, 1980 (#80002245)	Roughly bounded by Amite, Mill, Fortification, and Lamar Sts.; also roughly bounded by Amite, Lamar, Mill and Fortification Sts. 32°18′24″N 90°11′16″W	Jackson	Second set of boundaries represents a boundary increase of September 18, 1980
39	Floyd Mound		November 25, 1969 (#69000081)	Address restricted	Bovina	
40	Forest Home		June 22, 2026 (#100013145)	5230 Raymond-Bolton Road; 32°19′00″N 90°27′37″W	Bolton vicinity	
41	Fountainhead	Fountainhead	November 28, 1980 (#80002246)	306 Glen Way; 32°20′09″N 90°10′08″W	Jackson	
42	James M. Futch House		March 12, 1992 (#92000144)	Dry Grove Rd., 1½ miles south of its junction with Mississippi Highway 18; 32°13′09″N 90°25′31″W	Raymond	The structure was purchased in 1993 and relocated nine miles northeast on Dupree Rd to save it from demolition. It has been restore as a private dwelling.
43	Galloway-Williams House	Galloway-Williams House	October 10, 1985 (#85003100)	427 E. Fortification St. 32°18′42″N 90°10′50″W	Jackson	
44	George Street Grocery	George Street Grocery	July 8, 2010 (#10000438)	416 George St. 32°18′23″N 90°10′55″W	Jackson	
45	Gibbs-Von Seutter House	Gibbs-Von Seutter House	July 15, 1986 (#86001705)	Southern side of Dupree St. 32°15′42″N 90°25′33″W	Raymond	
46	Garner Wynn Green House	Garner Wynn Green House	October 31, 1985 (#85003440)	647 N. State St. 32°18′20″N 90°10′45″W	Jackson	
47	Greenwood Cemetery	Greenwood Cemetery	December 20, 1984 (#84000474)	Bounded by West, Davis, Lamar, and George Sts. 32°18′30″N 90°11′00″W	Jackson	
48	Griffith Memorial Baptist Church		September 15, 2022 (#100008165)	519 West Silas Brown St. 32°17′28″N 90°11′46″W	Jackson	
49	R.H. Henry Bridge	R.H. Henry Bridge	June 8, 2005 (#05000563)	U.S. Route 80 at the Big Black River; 32°20′51″N 90°41′49″W	Edwards	
50	Hinds County Armory	Hinds County Armory	December 1, 2000 (#00001462)	1012 Mississippi St. 32°18′07″N 90°10′27″W	Jackson	
51	Hinds County Courthouse	Hinds County Courthouse	July 31, 1986 (#86002125)	Pascagoula St. 32°17′48″N 90°10′58″W	Jackson	
52	Hinds County Courthouse	Hinds County Courthouse	July 15, 1986 (#86001706)	E. Main and N. Oak Sts. 32°15′37″N 90°25′24″W	Raymond	
53	Holly Grove Plantation House	Holly Grove Plantation House	November 7, 1996 (#96001313)	1056 Old Bridgeport Rd. 32°23′25″N 90°25′04″W	Bolton vicinity	
54	Houses at 500, 505, 512 and 513 North State Street	Houses at 500, 505, 512 and 513 North State Street	November 7, 1995 (#95001249)	500, 505, 512, and 513 N. State St. 32°18′13″N 90°10′45″W	Jackson	
55	Illinois Central Railroad Depot	Illinois Central Railroad Depot	July 15, 1986 (#86001707)	E. Main and Railroad Sts. 32°15′30″N 90°25′18″W	Raymond	
56	Illinois Central Railroad Depot	Illinois Central Railroad Depot	November 5, 2001 (#01001200)	102 Railroad Ave. 32°05′42″N 90°17′35″W	Terry	
57	Jackson Holiday Inn Southwest		October 16, 2023 (#100009438)	2649 US 80 West; 32°17′30″N 90°13′52″W	Jackson	
57	Jackson Municipal Auditorium		October 7, 2026 (#100013490)	255 East Pascagoula Street; 32°17′52″N 90°11′07″W	Jackson	
58	Dudley Jones House	Dudley Jones House	August 2, 1984 (#84002218)	115 Railroad Ave. 32°05′42″N 90°17′41″W	Terry	
59	Keith Press Building	Keith Press Building	July 15, 1986 (#86001708)	234 Town Sq. 32°15′35″N 90°25′21″W	Raymond	
60	Lanier Junior-Senior High School (Colored)	Lanier Junior-Senior High School (Colored)	September 10, 2014 (#14000567)	833 Maple St. 32°18′59″N 90°12′10″W	Jackson	
61	Lebanon Presbyterian Church	Lebanon Presbyterian Church	November 18, 1999 (#99001359)	Lebanon Presbyterian Church Rd. 32°08′55″N 90°31′22″W	Utica	
62	Leonard Court Historic District		May 8, 2024 (#100010319)	Leonard and Botnick Courts, between Farish and Mill Streets; 32°18′34″N 90°11′24″W	Jackson	
63	A.J. Lewis House	A.J. Lewis House	August 4, 1983 (#83000952)	S. Magnolia and Lewis Sts. 32°19′48″N 90°36′14″W	Edwards	
64	Ervin Lewis House	Ervin Lewis House	December 1, 1989 (#89002052)	5461 Old Byram Rd. 32°10′52″N 90°14′36″W	Byram	
65	Liberty Hall	Liberty Hall	March 19, 2008 (#08000197)	22822 Mississippi Highway 27; 32°03′43″N 90°29′06″W	Crystal Springs	
66	Lorena Duling School	Lorena Duling School	July 3, 2007 (#07000650)	622 Duling Ave. 32°20′11″N 90°10′33″W	Jackson	
67	John R. Lynch Street Civil Rights District		January 16, 2025 (#100011333)	North Side of Green-Gibbs Plaza, 1017 Lynch Street, and 1072 Lynch Street; 32°17′51″N 90°12′06″W	Jackson	
68	Magnolia Vale	Magnolia Vale	November 17, 1983 (#83003960)	Off Mississippi Highway 18; 32°12′17″N 90°28′24″W	Raymond	
69	Main Hall	Main Hall	July 15, 1986 (#86001709)	Northwest of Cain Hall; 32°15′19″N 90°25′02″W	Raymond	
70	Manship House	Manship House	October 18, 1972 (#72000693)	412 E. Fortification St. 32°18′45″N 90°10′53″W	Jackson	
71	McNair Plantation	McNair Plantation	May 3, 1982 (#82003101)	Southeast of Raymond on Mississippi Highway 18; 32°10′19″N 90°30′30″W	Raymond	
72	McRae's Department Store at Meadowbrook Mart	McRae's Department Store at Meadowbrook Mart	March 3, 2015 (#14000568)	4206 N. State St. 32°20′59″N 90°10′26″W	Jackson	
73	Merrill-Maley House	Merrill-Maley House	April 29, 1982 (#82003100)	739 N. State St. 32°18′27″N 90°10′44″W	Jackson	
74	Millsaps-Buie House	Millsaps-Buie House	June 19, 1973 (#73001014)	628 N. State St. 32°18′18″N 90°10′43″W	Jackson	
75	Mississippi Federation of Women's Clubs	Mississippi Federation of Women's Clubs	June 30, 1988 (#88000975)	2407 N. State St. 32°19′37″N 90°10′33″W	Jackson	
76	Mississippi Foundry and Machine Company Building	Mississippi Foundry and Machine Company Building	July 16, 2008 (#08000674)	300 W. South St. 32°20′25″N 90°10′02″W	Jackson	
77	Mississippi Governor's Mansion	Mississippi Governor's Mansion	November 25, 1969 (#69000085)	316 E. Capitol St. 32°18′00″N 90°11′00″W	Jackson	
78	Mississippi State Capitol	Mississippi State Capitol	November 25, 1969 (#69000086)	Fronting Mississippi St., between N. President and N. West Sts. 32°18′56″N 90°11′49″W	Jackson	The "New Capitol" building, built in 1903; designated a National Historic Landmark in 2016.
79	Morris Ice Company		May 16, 2019 (#100003950)	652 Commerce St. 32°17′33″N 90°10′49″W	Jackson	
80	Joseph Henry Morris House	Joseph Henry Morris House	August 11, 1983 (#83000953)	305 N. State St. 32°18′13″N 90°10′47″W	Jackson	
81	Mt. Olive Cemetery		June 5, 2017 (#100001028)	900 blk. of John R. Lynch St. 32°17′51″N 90°12′10″W	Jackson	
82	Municipal Art Gallery	Municipal Art Gallery	March 27, 2012 (#12000154)	839 N. State St. 32°18′36″N 90°10′43″W	Jackson	
83	N&W Overall Company Building	N&W Overall Company Building	November 14, 2007 (#07001180)	736 S. President St. 32°17′33″N 90°10′58″W	Jackson	
84	Naval and Marine Corps Reserve Center	Naval and Marine Corps Reserve Center	November 19, 2002 (#02000209)	181 S. Jefferson St. 32°18′00″N 90°10′42″W	Jackson	
85	New Orleans Great Northern Railroad Passenger Depot	New Orleans Great Northern Railroad Passenger Depot	March 1, 1996 (#96000188)	618 Pearl St. 32°17′54″N 90°10′45″W	Jackson	
86	North Manor Apartments	North Manor Apartments	March 3, 1995 (#95000177)	909 North St. 32°18′37″N 90°10′37″W	Jackson	
87	The Oaks	The Oaks	May 25, 1973 (#73001015)	823 N. Jefferson St. 32°18′32″N 90°10′34″W	Jackson	
88	Old State Capitol	Old State Capitol	November 25, 1969 (#69000087)	100 N. State St. 32°17′57″N 90°10′48″W	Jackson	
89	Old Terminal Building, Hawkins Field		September 9, 2020 (#100005578)	Airport Dr. 32°19′41″N 90°13′00″W	Jackson	
90	Peyton House	Peyton House	October 3, 1973 (#73001016)	North of Raymond on Clinton Rd. 32°16′01″N 90°25′12″W	Raymond	
91	Phoenix Hall-Johnson-Harper House	Phoenix Hall-Johnson-Harper House	July 15, 1986 (#86001710)	527 E. Palestine St. 32°15′12″N 90°25′09″W	Raymond	
92	Pocahontas Mound A	Pocahontas Mound A	November 25, 1969 (#69000365)	In a park along U.S. Route 49, near its junction with Interstate 220; 32°28′09″N 90°17′18″W	Pocahontas	
93	Pocahontas Mound B		April 11, 1972 (#72000694)	Address restricted	Pocahontas	
94	Poindexter Park Historic District	Poindexter Park Historic District	June 9, 1995 (#95000685)	Roughly bounded by W. Pearl St., Rose St., Hunt St., W. Capitol St., and Clifton St. 32°18′06″N 90°11′53″W	Jackson	
95	Porter House	Porter House	July 15, 1986 (#86001702)	233 North Oak St. 32°15′41″N 90°25′21″W	Raymond	
96	Provine Chapel	Provine Chapel	November 21, 2025 (#100012264)	200 West College Street (Mississippi College); 32°20′11″N 90°19′47″W	Clinton	
97	Raymond Battlefield Site	Raymond Battlefield Site	January 13, 1972 (#72000695)	2.5 miles southwest of Raymond on Mississippi Highway 18; 32°14′30″N 90°27′00″W	Raymond	Site of the Battle of Raymond
98	Raymond Historic District	Raymond Historic District	July 27, 2007 (#07000749)	Roughly Town Sq., with parts of E. Main, Palestine, Cooper's Well, Clinton, Oak, Court, W. Main, Dupree, and Port Gibson; 32°15′34″N 90°25′22″W	Raymond	
99	Dr. Jacob and Mrs. Daisy Reddix House		January 5, 2024 (#100009008)	1136 Valley St. 32°17′55″N 90°12′57″W	Jackson	
100	Smith Robertson Elementary School	Smith Robertson Elementary School	December 13, 1978 (#78001601)	528 Bloom St. 32°18′19″N 90°11′11″W	Jackson	
101	Saint Mark's Episcopal Church	Saint Mark's Episcopal Church	July 15, 1986 (#86001712)	W. Main and N. Oak Sts. 32°15′38″N 90°25′26″W	Raymond	
102	Shelton House	Shelton House	July 15, 1986 (#86001711)	561 W. Main St. 32°16′00″N 90°25′40″W	Raymond	
103	Sims House	Sims House	March 31, 1983 (#83000954)	513 N. State St. 32°18′14″N 90°10′46″W	Jackson	
104	Smith Apartments		July 20, 2020 (#100005036)	1047 Smith Dr. 32°15′02″N 90°26′15″W	Raymond	
105	Smith Park Architectural District	Smith Park Architectural District	April 23, 1976 (#76001097)	Irregular pattern along N. West and N. Congress Sts. between Capitol St. and the state capitol; also 225 E. Capitol St.; also 308 E. Pearl St.; also 200 blk. E. Capitol St. 32°18′02″N 90°11′00″W	Jackson	Capitol and Pearl addresses represent boundary increases of October 29, 1993 and March 24, 2004 respectively; a third boundary increase was listed July 25, 2014, and a fourth was added October 16, 2023
106	Southern Christian Institute	Southern Christian Institute	January 30, 2007 (#06001323)	18449 Old U.S. Route 80, W. 32°20′17″N 90°38′16″W	Edwards	
107	Southwest Midtown Historic District		October 4, 2019 (#100004504)	Roughly bounded by Whitfield St., Blair St., East Bell St., and North Mill St. 32°18′53″N 90°11′16″W	Jackson	
108	Pearl Spann Elementary School		January 25, 2018 (#100002030)	1615 Brecon Dr. 32°21′33″N 90°08′29″W	Jackson	
109	Spengler's Corner	Spengler's Corner	October 20, 1977 (#77000789)	101 N. State St. 32°17′57″N 90°10′49″W	Jackson	
110	Spengler's Corner Historic District	Spengler's Corner Historic District	November 15, 1979 (#79001311)	E. Capitol, N. State, and N. President Sts; also 400 blk. E. Capitol, 100-300 blks N. State & 100 blk. N. & S. President Sts. 32°17′57″N 90°10′50″W	Jackson	Second set of addresses represent a boundary increase approved January 24, 2019
111	Spengler-Thomas Building	Spengler-Thomas Building	May 9, 2003 (#03000387)	129 S. President; 32°18′00″N 90°10′55″W	Jackson	
112	Stamp's Super Burgers		December 4, 2023 (#100009009)	1801 Dalton St. 32°17′26″N 90°12′21″W	Jackson	
113	Sub Rosa	Sub Rosa	April 28, 1975 (#75001046)	South of Pocahontas on U.S. Route 49; 32°26′31″N 90°17′35″W	Pocahontas	
114	Tanglewood	Tanglewood	September 18, 2013 (#13000738)	301 Jefferson St. 32°20′21″N 90°19′51″W	Clinton	
115	Terry Colored School		February 23, 2026 (#100012737)	300 Canton Street; 32°06′00″N 90°17′42″W	Terry	
116	Upper Midtown Historic District		October 3, 2014 (#100004503)	Roughly bounded by Duncan Ave., N. West St., McTyere Ave. & North Mill St.; also, roughly bounded by Duncan Ave., North West, Livingston, & North Mill Sts. 32°19′21″N 90°11′08″W	Jackson	Second set of addresses represent a boundary increase approved September 16, 2022.
117	Virden-Patton House	Virden-Patton House	December 16, 1983 (#83003962)	512 N. State St. 32°18′13″N 90°10′44″W	Jackson	
118	Warren-Guild-Simmons House	Warren-Guild-Simmons House	January 11, 1979 (#79001312)	734 Fairview St. 32°19′13″N 90°10′36″W	Jackson	
119	Waterhouse-Simmons House		May 11, 2018 (#100002422)	646 Seneca Ave. 32°20′28″N 90°10′23″W	Jackson	
120	Eudora Welty House	Eudora Welty House	November 21, 2002 (#02001388)	1119 Pinehurst St. 32°19′08″N 90°10′13″W	Jackson	
121	West Capitol Street Historic District	West Capitol Street Historic District	March 13, 1980 (#80002248)	Roughly bounded by railroad tracks and Amite, Roach, and Pearl Sts. 32°18′02″N 90°11′24″W	Jackson	
122	Whitehead and Lloyd Motor Company		January 22, 2025 (#100011332)	430 South State Street; 32°17′43″N 90°10′52″W	Jackson	
123	Wiener House at 228 Ridge Drive	Wiener House at 228 Ridge Drive	November 2, 2009 (#09000884)	228 Ridge Dr. 32°20′25″N 90°10′02″W	Jackson	
124	Dr. Julian and Kathryn Wiener House		February 8, 2021 (#100006137)	3858 Redbud Rd. 32°20′21″N 90°08′25″W	Jackson	
125	Alex Williams House	Alex Williams House	July 3, 1979 (#79001313)	937 N. Lamar St. 32°18′33″N 90°11′04″W	Jackson	
126	Woodrow Wilson Bridge	Woodrow Wilson Bridge	November 16, 1988 (#88002485)	Spans the Pearl River on Silas Brown St. 32°17′22″N 90°10′44″W	Jackson	Extends into Rankin County
127	WJDX Transmitter Building		October 8, 2024 (#100010904)	5826 North State Street; 32°23′01″N 90°09′33″W	Jackson	
128	Wolfe House	Wolfe House	June 22, 1989 (#89000762)	401 Claiborne; 32°05′48″N 90°17′56″W	Terry	

== Former listings ==
	Name on the Register	Image	Date listed	Date removed	Location	City or town	Description
1	Armour Company Smokehouse and Distribution Plant		November 25, 1983 (#83003956)	November 12, 2009	320 W. Pearl St. 32°17′59″N 90°11′32″W	Jackson	Destroyed by two successive fires in 1999
2	Cain Hall		March 10, 1997 (#97000214)	December 15, 1999	Hinds Community College, approximately .75 mi. W of jct. of MS 18 and MS 467	Raymond	Destroyed by fire March 7, 1998
3	Will Watkins House		September 13, 1978 (#78001602)	May 15, 1987	1423 N. State St.	Jackson	Destroyed by fire on August 6, 1984
4	Welty House		October 27, 1980 (#80002247)	March 6, 1986	741 N. Congress St.	Jackson	Childhood home of Eudora Welty. Removed due to significant alteration

== See also ==
- List of National Historic Landmarks in Mississippi
- National Register of Historic Places listings in Mississippi
