= Raymond Historic District =

Historic district in Mississippi, United States

- U.S. National Register of Historic Places
- U.S. Historic district
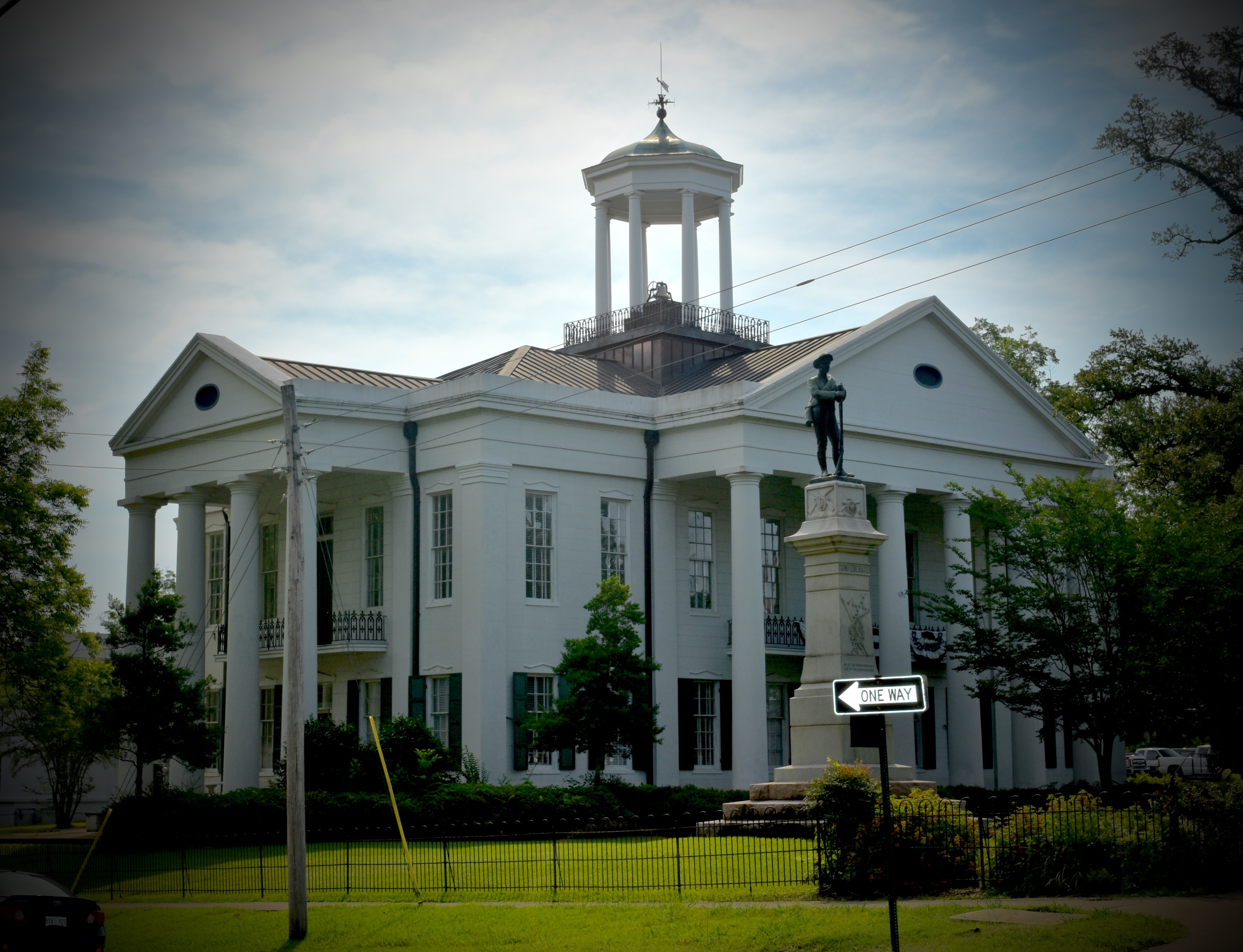

- Location within Mississippi Location within the United States
- Location: Roughly Town Sq, with parts of E. Main, Palestine, Cooper's Well, Clinton, Oak, Court, W. Main, Dupree, and Port Gibson, Raymond, Mississippi
- Area: 80 acres (32 ha)
- Built: 1829
- Built by: Weldon Brothers
- Architectural style: Federal, Greek Revival, et al.
- MPS: Raymond and Vicinity MRA
- NRHP reference No.: 07000749
- Added to NRHP: July 27, 2007

The Raymond Historic District is an 80-acre (32 ha) historic district in Raymond, Mississippi that was listed on the National Register of Historic Places in 2007. The listing included 76 contributing buildings, a contributing structure, and a contributing object. Work by the Weldon Brothers is included.

Hinds County Courthouse, built during 1857–1859, is "celebrated as one of the state's finest Greek Revival public buildings". It was built by George and Tom Weldon, "a famed architectural and contracting firm from the Natchez area who also designed the 1858 Old Warren County Courthouse in Vicksburg, 45 miles east, which is a National Historic Landmark. The design of the courthouse is credited to Jackson, a slave who worked as a draftsman for the Weldon brothers and also designed the Old Warren County Courthouse. As was true for many antebellum buildings, the workmen were also skilled slaves."

Nine properties within the district's area were already separately listed on the National Register. These are:

- Dupree-Ratliff House at 101 Dupree Street,
- Gibbs Von-Sutter House at 104 Dupree Street,
- Illinois Central Railroad Depot at 201 East Main Street,
- Hinds County Courthouse at 127 West Main Street,
- St. Mark's Episcopal Church at 205 West Main Street,
- 214 Port Gibson Street,
- Keith Press Building at 234 Town Square, and the
- Porter House at 233 North Oak Street
- Lillian Boteler House at 214 Gibson Rd.

== See also ==
- National Register of Historic Places listings in Hinds County, Mississippi
