= Hinds County Courthouse =

Hinds County Courthouse may refer to:

- Hinds County Courthouse (Jackson, Mississippi), listed on the NRHP in Hinds County, Mississippi
- Hinds County Courthouse (Raymond, Mississippi), also listed on the NRHP in Hinds County, Mississippi
