= George and Thomas Weldon =

George and Thomas Weldon, also known as the Weldon Brothers, were brothers from Antrim, Ireland who worked as builders in Mississippi.

They built the Old Courthouse, Warren County, which is a U.S. National Historic Landmark for its Greek Revival architecture and for its prominent place in history. The design for that is variously ascribed to another brother, William Weldon, and to Jackson, a slave.

Works include:

- Old Courthouse, Warren County, NRHP-listed
- Hinds County Courthouse, E. Main and N. Oak Sts. Raymond, MS (Weldon, George; Weldon, Thomas), NRHP-listed
- Iberville Parish Courthouse, 209 Main St. Plaquemine, LA (Weldon, George; Weldon, Thomas), Greek Revival architecture, NRHP-listed
- Institute Hall, 111 S. Pearl ST. Natchez, MS (Weldon Brothers), NRHP-listed

The Hinds County Courthouse is included in the NRHP-listed Raymond Historic District.
