= Jackson Municipal Art Gallery =

- Municipal Art Gallery
- U.S. National Register of Historic Places
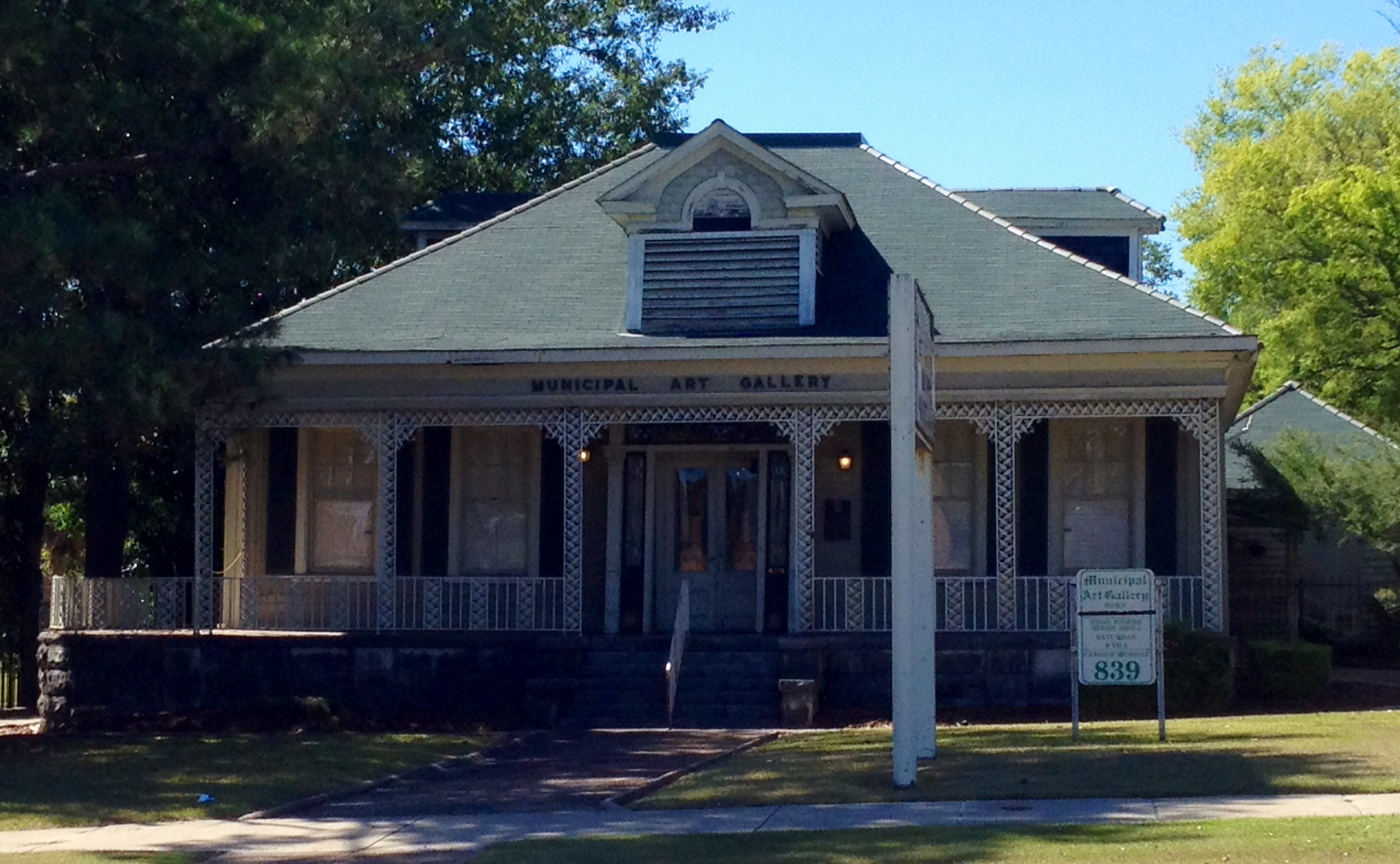

- Location within Mississippi
- Location: 839 N. State St., Jackson, Mississippi
- Coordinates: 32°18′36″N 90°10′43″W
- Area: less than one acre
- Architectural style: Classical Revival
- NRHP reference No.: 12000154
- Added to NRHP: March 27, 2012

Jackson Municipal Art Gallery is housed in a historic residence in Jackson, Mississippi. It is listed on the National Register of Historic Places. In 2008 it was designated a Mississippi Landmark. It is at 839 North State Street.

The Classical Revival architecture home was built in 1869 by John Ligon. Donated to the city, The Mississippi Art Association began using it in 1926.

It is a one-story wood frame home with a pyramidal roof. It was renovated after a 1975 fire.

== See also ==
- National Register of Historic Places listings in Hinds County, Mississippi
