= Morris Ice Company =

Coordinates: 32.2924°N 90.1799°W

- U.S. National Register of Historic Places
- Location within Mississippi
- Location: 652 Commerce St., Jackson, Mississippi
- Area: 3 acres (1.2 ha)
- NRHP reference No.: 100003950
- Added to NRHP: May 16, 2019

Morris Ice Company is a former ice manufacturing business in Jackson, Mississippi. Its plant is listed on the National Register of Historic Places.

The company was founded along the Pearl River in 1875 and brought in ice cut from lakes in the North packed in sawdust and delivered via barges along the Mississippi River and then railcars to Jackson. An ice manufacturing plant was built for the company in 1880. It burned in 1923. The extant building on Commerce Street was built the following year.

Empty for 30 years until 2019, it was slated to be renovated for use as an entertainment venue. In 2024 it burned.

A home owned by the Morris family in Jackson, the Joseph Henry Morris House, is also listed on the National Register.

== See also ==
- National Register of Historic Places listings in Hinds County, Mississippi
