= Virden =

Virden may refer to:

== People ==
- Claude Virden (born 1947), American basketball player

== Places ==
=== Canada ===
- Virden, Manitoba

=== United States ===
- Virden, Illinois
- Virden Township, Illinois
- Virden, New Mexico
- Virden-Patton House, historic house in Mississippi
