= Ervin Lewis House =

Historic house in Mississippi, United States

- U.S. National Register of Historic Places
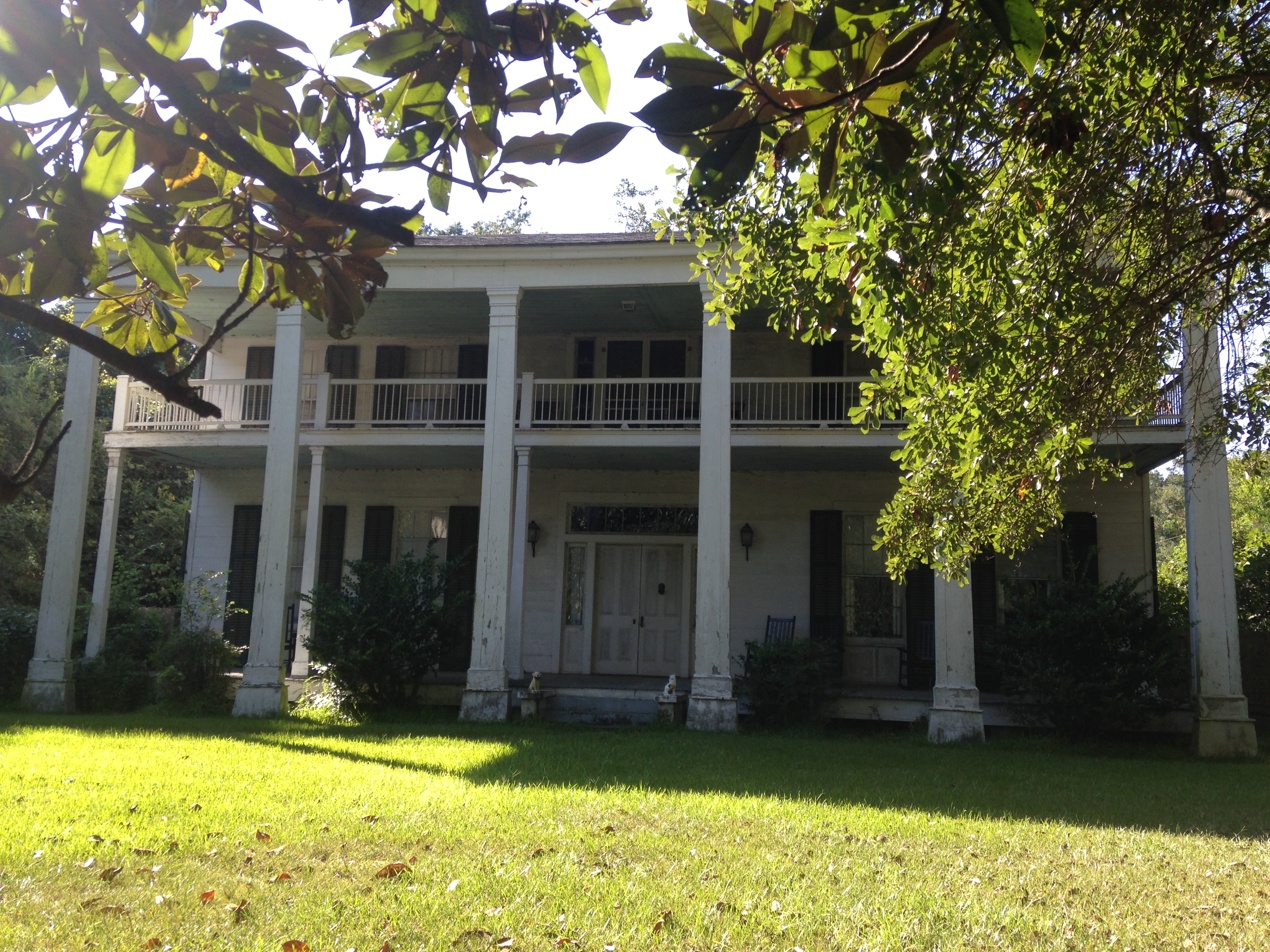

- Location within Mississippi Location within the United States
- Interactive map showing the location of Ervin Lewis House
- Location: 5461 Old Byram Road, Byram, Mississippi
- Coordinates: 32°10′52″N 90°14′36″W
- Area: 7 acres (2.8 ha)
- Built: 1860
- Architectural style: Greek Revival
- NRHP reference No.: 89002052
- Added to NRHP: December 1, 1989

The Ervin Lewis House is a historic mansion in Byram, Mississippi, U.S.. It was built for John Coon prior to the American Civil War As Coon came from the North, the Union Army did not destroy it during the war. It was purchased by Ervin Lewis, who was from South Carolina, after the war. It was designed in the Greek Revival architectural style. It has been listed on the National Register of Historic Places since December 1, 1989. It is currently a private residence.
