= Hinds County Armory =

Historic Armory in Jackson, Mississippi (Hinds County)

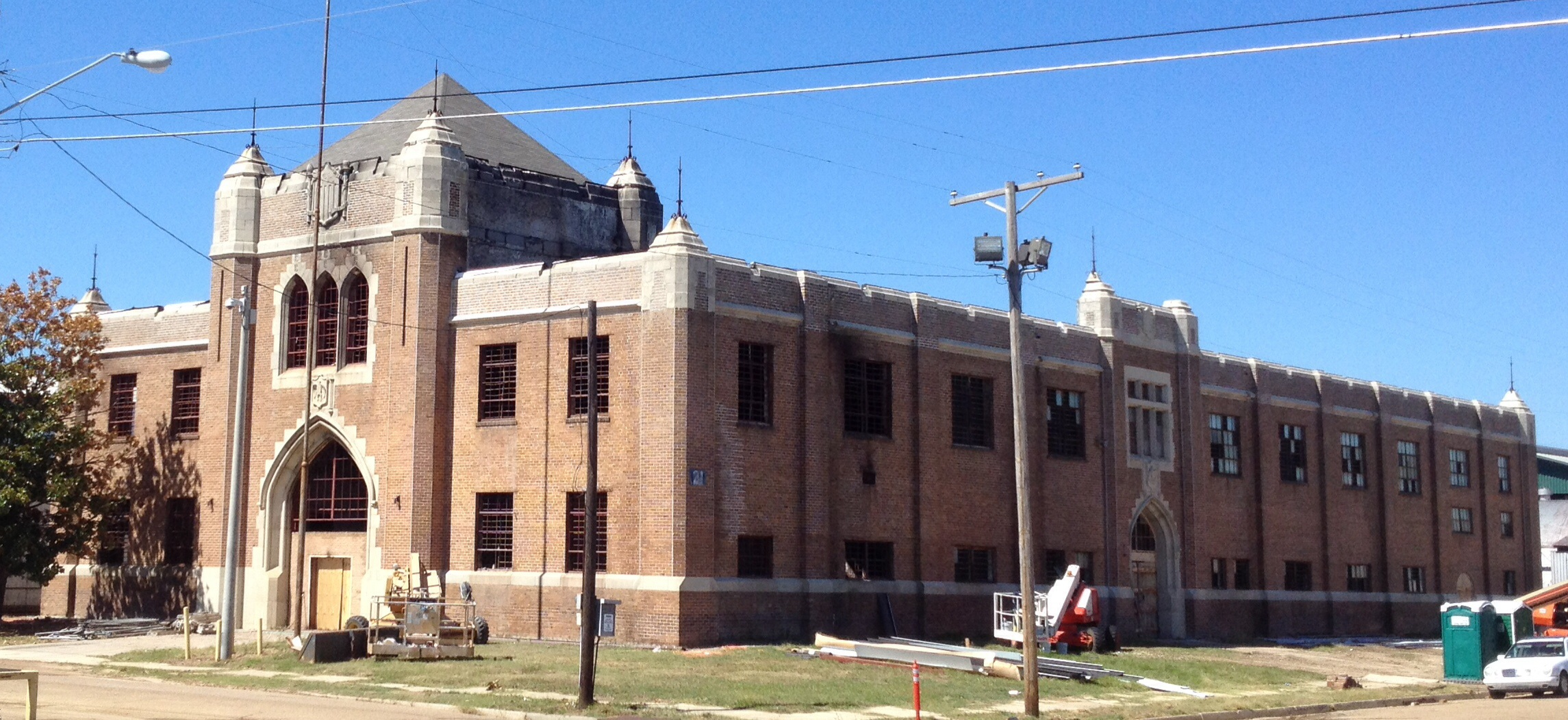
Hinds County Armory in 2013

Hinds County Armory is a former armory building in Jackson, Mississippi. Built during the 1920s, the armory is in the Hinds County Fairgrounds. In use until 1979, a fire badly damaged the armory building during structural rehabilitation in 2013.

== History ==
A building site worth $80,000 was donated by Robert E. Kinnington in 1922. Designed by local architect Frank P. Gates, the armory was built by contractor I.C. Garber in 1927 and was in use by Mississippi guardsmen by 1929.

The armory is an example of Gothic Revival Architecture, made of brick, and has pointed arches. The facility closed in 1979. The building was designated a Mississippi Landmark in 1986 and was added to the National Register of Historic Places. For many years, the community was divided on how to treat the structure. Some residents wanted to see the armory preserved and others wanted it razed.

In 2013 the structure caught fire while undergoing a $600,000 rehabilitation. At 1012 Mississippi Street, it is part of the state fairgrounds and has sat empty with a leaky roof and is deteriorating.

== See also ==
- National Register of Historic Places listings in Hinds County, Mississippi
