= N & W Overall Company =

Historic building

- N & W Overall Company Building
- U.S. National Register of Historic Places
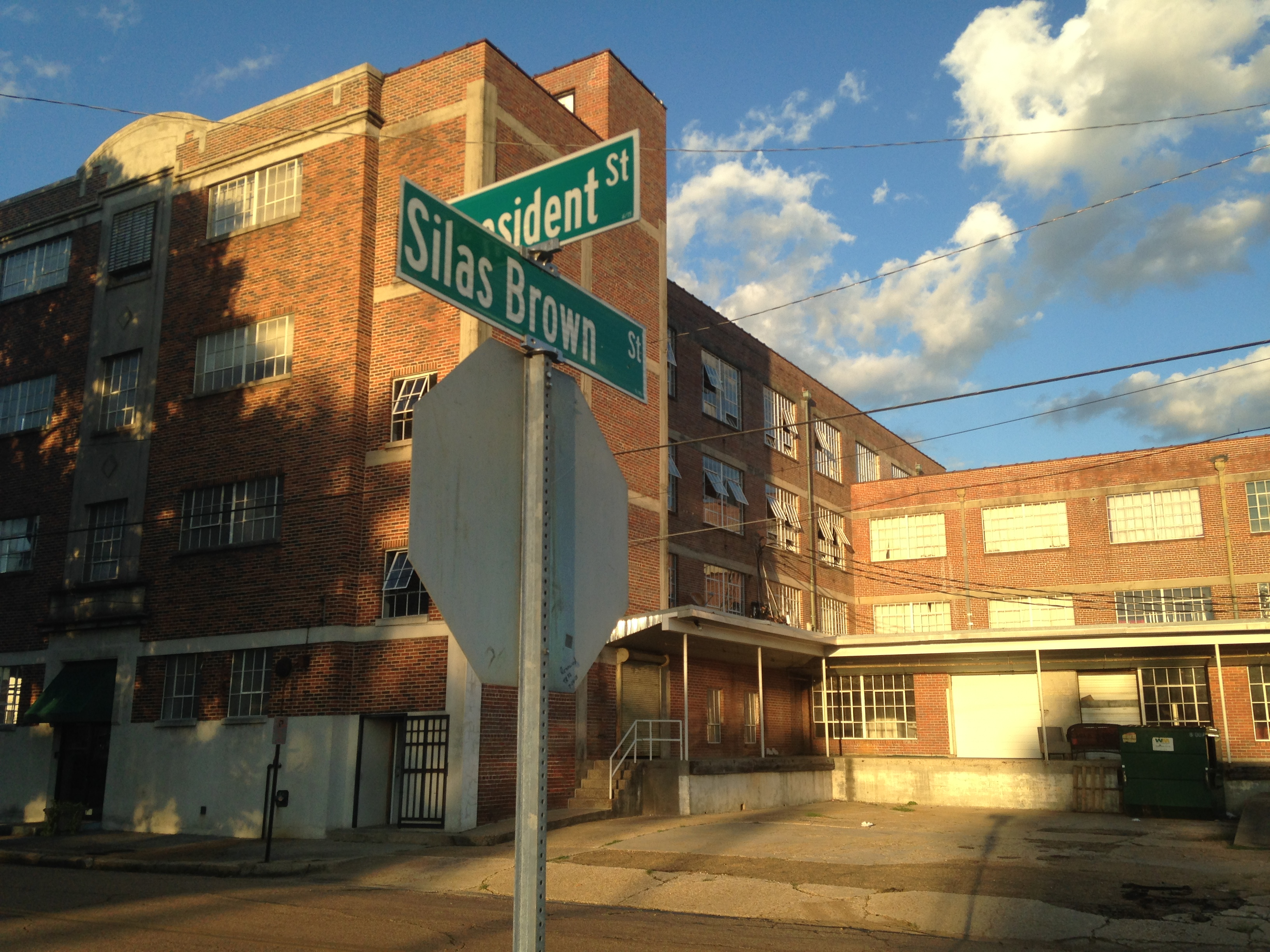
- The N & W Overall Company Building in 2016.

- Location within Mississippi
- Location: 736 S President St., Jackson, Mississippi
- Coordinates: 32°17′33″N 90°10′58″W
- Area: less than one acre
- Built: 1928
- NRHP reference No.: 07001180
- Added to NRHP: November 14, 2007

The N & W Overall Company was a clothing manufacturer in the United States. Their factory building in Jackson, Mississippi is extant and listed on the National Register of Historic Places. Completed in 1928, the four-story masonry and brick building has heavy timber framing and plank floors and ceilings. The building was later used by Dickies.

The company was established in Lynchburg, Virginia in 1916. It supplied military uniforms during World War II. It advertised its overalls, shirts, and pants. It advertised its clothes being sanforized and listed manufacturing plants in cities in Virginia, Mississippi, and Arkansas.

== See also ==
- National Register of Historic Places listings in Hinds County, Mississippi
