= Hattie Casey Elementary School =

Historic elementary school in Jackson, Mississippi

- Casey Elementary School
- U.S. National Register of Historic Places
- Location within Mississippi
- Location: 2101 Lake Cir., Jackson, Mississippi
- Coordinates: 32°20′34″N 90°08′26″W
- Area: 6 acres (2.4 ha)
- Architect: Charles Griffith Mitchell, Jr.; Neal and Chastain
- NRHP reference No.: 100002029
- Added to NRHP: January 25, 2018

Hattie Casey Elementary School is a public school in Jackson, Mississippi. It was built in 1961 to accommodate Jackson's growing population after World War II. It was white only. It was named for educator Hattie M. Casey (1894–1959), who taught for 38 years at Power Elementary School until retiring in June 1959. It is listed on the National Register of Historic Places. The building is considered modern or international in architectural style.

The school is at 2101 Lake Circle. In 2025, the student body of 250 students was 94 percent Black, 1,6 percent Hispanic, and 2.8 percent White.

== See also ==
- National Register of Historic Places listings in Hinds County, Mississippi
