= Phoenix Hall-Johnson-Harper House =

Historic house in Mississippi, United States

- Phoenix Hall--Johnson-Harper House
- U.S. National Register of Historic Places
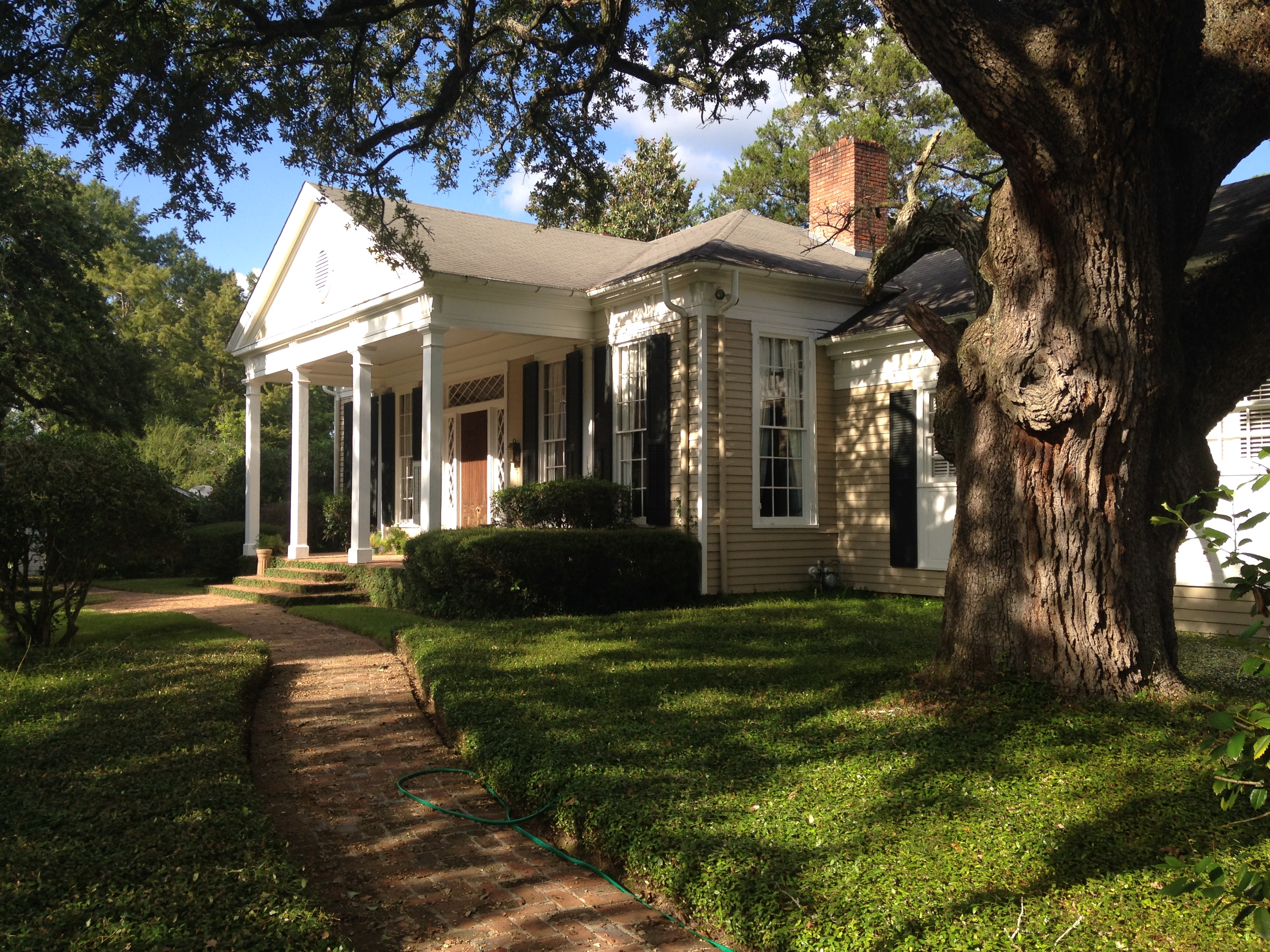
- The house in 2016

- Location within Mississippi
- Location: 527 East Palestine Street, Raymond, Mississippi
- Coordinates: 32°15′12″N 90°25′09″W
- Area: 3.1 acres (1.3 ha)
- Built: 1854
- Architectural style: Greek Revival
- MPS: Raymond and Vicinity MRA
- NRHP reference No.: 86001710
- Added to NRHP: July 15, 1986

The Johnson-Harper House, also known as Phoenix Hall, is a historic house in Raymond, Mississippi. It was built in 1854, and designed in the Greek Revival architectural style. It is listed on the National Register of Historic Places.

== History ==
The house was built in 1854 for Amos Johnson, a circuit judge. It became known as Phoenix Hall because it was built on the site of Johnson's first home which had burned down.

The house was purchased by Major George W. Harper, the editor of the Hinds County Gazette, in 1861. Harper lived here with his wife and his ten children. During the American Civil War of 1861–1865, the house was ransacked by the Union Army. In the postbellum era, Harper resumed his role as editor, and he served as a member of the Mississippi House of Representatives in 1875–1876. He retired as editor in 1883, when his son George took the helm of the newspaper.

== Architectural significance ==
The house was designed in the Greek Revival architectural style. It has been listed on the National Register of Historic Places since July 15, 1986.
