= Alex Williams House =

Historic house in Mississippi, United States

- U.S. National Register of Historic Places
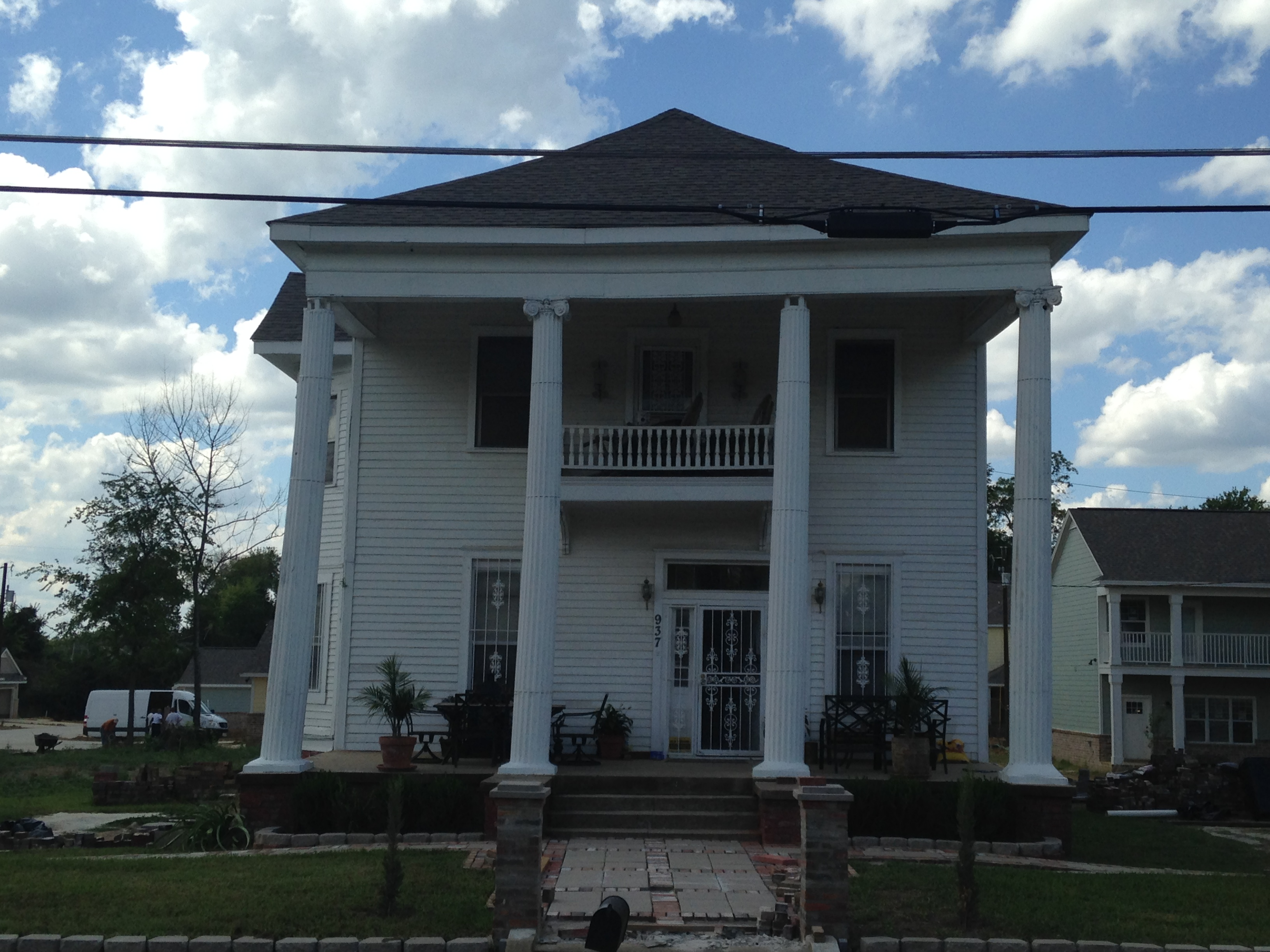
- The house in 2016

- Location within Mississippi
- Location: 937 North Lamar Street, Jackson, Mississippi
- Coordinates: 32°18′33″N 90°11′04″W
- Area: 0.3 acres (0.12 ha)
- Built: 1912
- Built by: George Thomas
- Architectural style: Colonial Revival
- NRHP reference No.: 79001313
- Added to NRHP: July 3, 1979

The Alex William House, also known as the Greystone Hotel, is a historic house in Jackson, Mississippi. It was built in 1912 by George Thomas, an African-American building contractor, for Alex Williams, an African-American grocer. From 1922 to 1945, it belonged to the Marino family, and it became a hotel in 1950.

The house was designed in the Colonial Revival architectural style. It has been listed on the National Register of Historic Places since July 3, 1979.
