= Wolfe House (Terry, Mississippi) =

Historic house in Mississippi, United States

- U.S. National Register of Historic Places
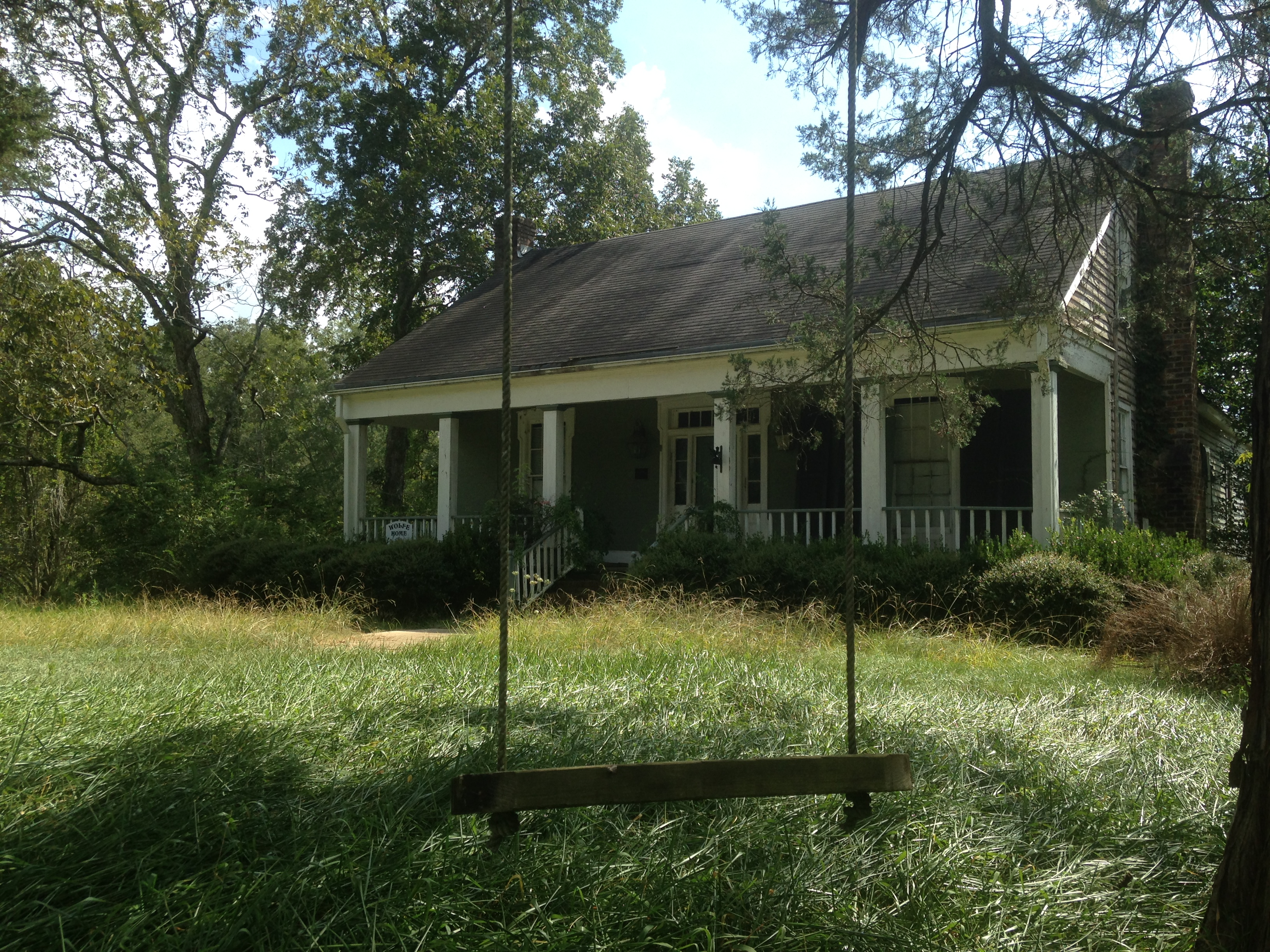
- The Wolfe House in 2016

- Location within Mississippi
- Interactive map showing the location for Wolfe House
- Location: 401 Claiborne, Terry, Mississippi
- Coordinates: 32°05′48″N 90°17′56″W
- Area: 1 acre (0.40 ha)
- Built: 1852
- Architectural style: Greek Revival
- NRHP reference No.: 89000762
- Added to NRHP: June 22, 1989

The Wolfe House is a historic cottage in Terry, Mississippi. It was built in 1852 on land owned by the Terry family, and it was designed in the Greek Revival architectural style. It is listed on the National Register of Historic Places.

== History ==
The cottage was built in 1852 for W. D. Terry, a large cotton planter, as a rental property. Terry had inherited over 600 acres from his father, Joseph M. Terry. The property remained in the Terry family until 1868.

From 1904 to 1956, the cottage belonged to the Wolfe family. It was subsequently acquired by Lewis Grubbs, followed by the Bass family.

== Architectural significance ==
The cottage was designed in the Greek Revival architectural style. It has been listed on the National Register of Historic Places since June 22, 1989.
