= Sims House (Jackson, Mississippi) =

Historic house in Mississippi, United States

- U.S. National Register of Historic Places
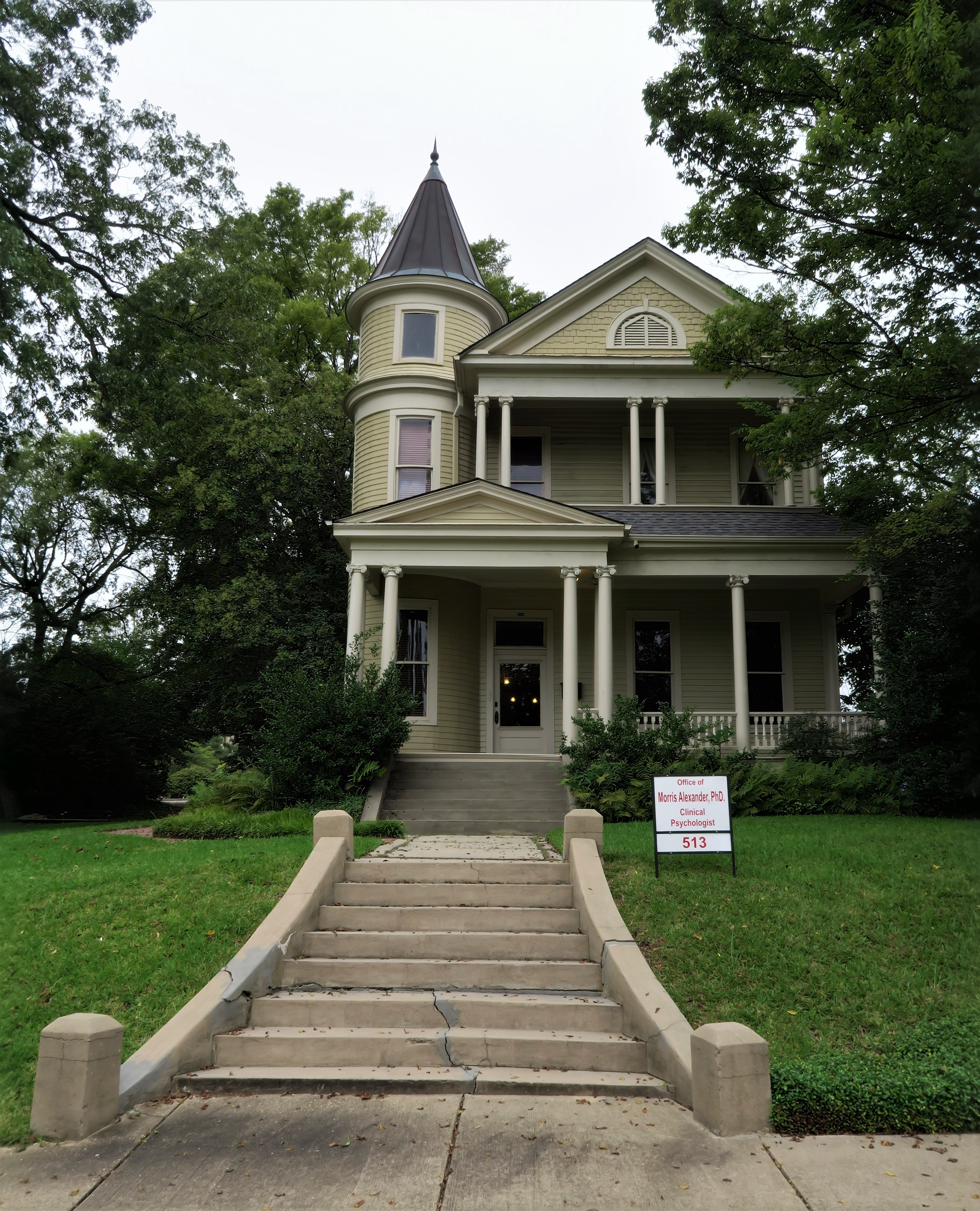

- Location within Mississippi Location within the United States
- Interactive map showing the location of Sims House
- Location: 513 N. State St., Jackson, Mississippi
- Coordinates: 32°18′14.6″N 90°10′47.1″W
- Built: 1905; 121 years ago
- Architectural style: Colonial Revival, Queen Anne
- NRHP reference No.: 83000954
- Added to NRHP: March 31, 1983

The Sims House at 513 N. State St. in Jackson, Mississippi is significant as one of the last surviving Queen Anne style houses on the state capitol's "Grand Boulevard". Following construction of the state's Beaux-Arts style capitol building (designed by Theodore Link) in 1903, North State Street developed as a tree-lined avenue of homes of state leaders. Notable Mississippi native Dr. Walter Scott Sims, who was the state's first eye, ear, nose and throat specialist and who was a pioneer in eye cataract surgery, bought the property from Joseph Henry Morris in 1905. The house was built in c. 1905 for Sims.

The house was listed on the National Register of Historic Places in 1983. When listed, it was under restoration and was owned by descendants of Joseph Henry Morris. It is currently a commercial property.

Other notable homes on the street listed on, or eligible for, the National Register have included:

- Merrill-Maley House (c.1907), 739 N. State St., Colonial Revival, (designed by Theodore Link?)
- Will Watkins House (c.1908), 1423 N. State St., Colonial Revival, (designed by Theodore Link?) (Note: Will Watkins House may not currently be National Register listed, according to its status identifier in one off-line version of the NRIS database, but it was the subject of NR listing 78001602.)
- Smith-Crowder-Capers House (c.1894), Queen Anne (Note: Smith-Crowder-Capers House also may not currently be National Register listed, as it does not appear in one off-line version of the NRIS database.)
- Millsaps-Buie House (c.1888), 628 N. State St., Queen Anne, but remodeled c.1928 with a monumental Greek Revival portico.
