= Dudley Jones House =

Historic house in Mississippi, United States

- U.S. National Register of Historic Places
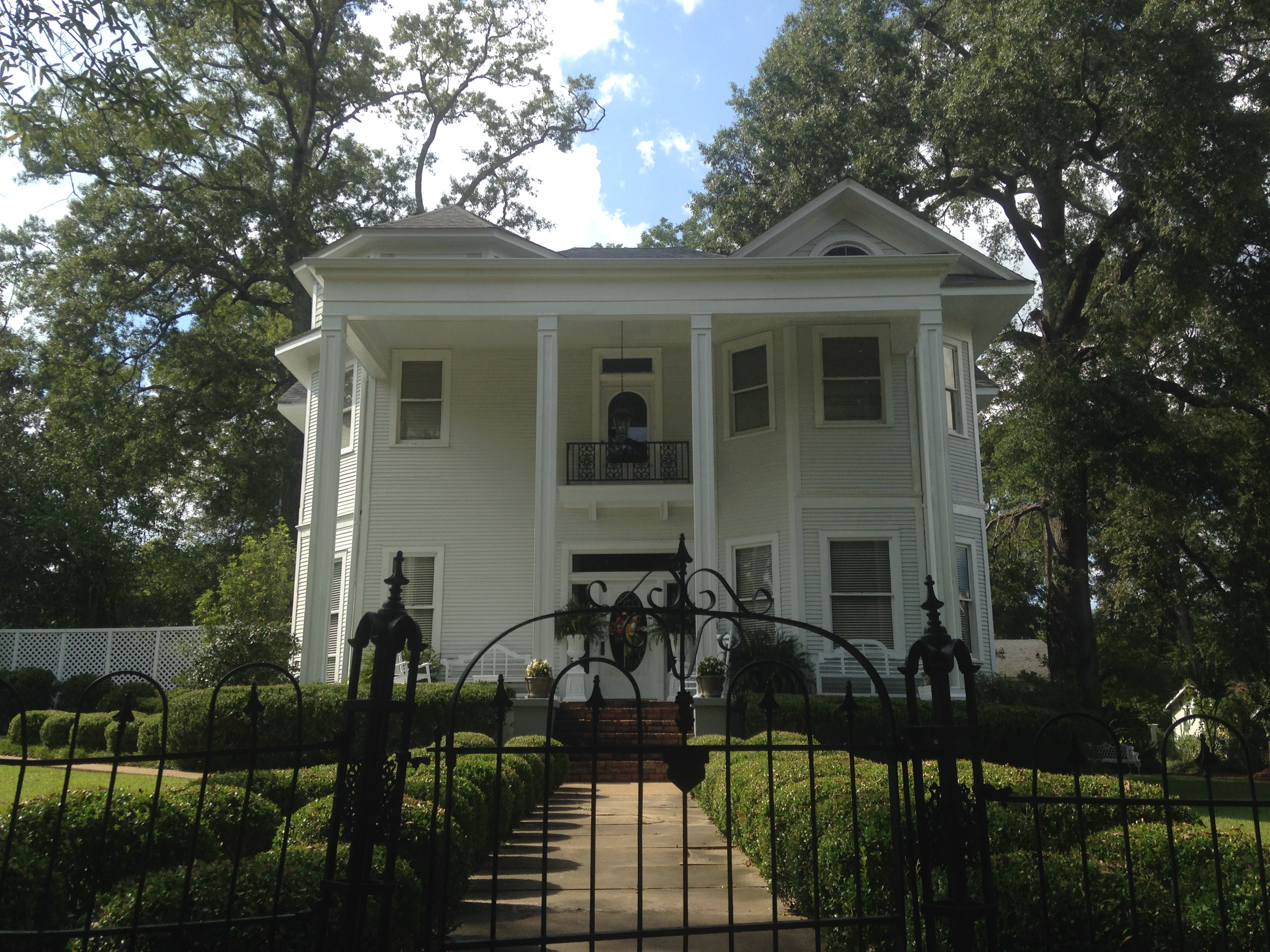
- The house in 2016

- Location within Mississippi
- Location: 115 Railroad Avenue, Terry, Mississippi
- Coordinates: 32°05′42″N 90°17′41″W
- Area: 0.5 acres (0.20 ha)
- Built: 1907
- Architectural style: Queen Anne
- NRHP reference No.: 84002218
- Added to NRHP: August 2, 1984

The Dudley Jones House is a historic house in Terry, Mississippi. It was built in 1907 for the Jones family, who remained the property owners until 1926. They sold it to B.P. Prattini, who bought it for his daughter, Annie and her husband George H. Terry. Their son, George B. Terry inherited the house and sold it in 1970.

The house was designed in the Queen Anne architectural style. It has been listed on the National Register of Historic Places since August 2, 1984.
