= A.J. Lewis House =

Historic house in Mississippi, United States

- A. J. Lewis House
- U.S. National Register of Historic Places
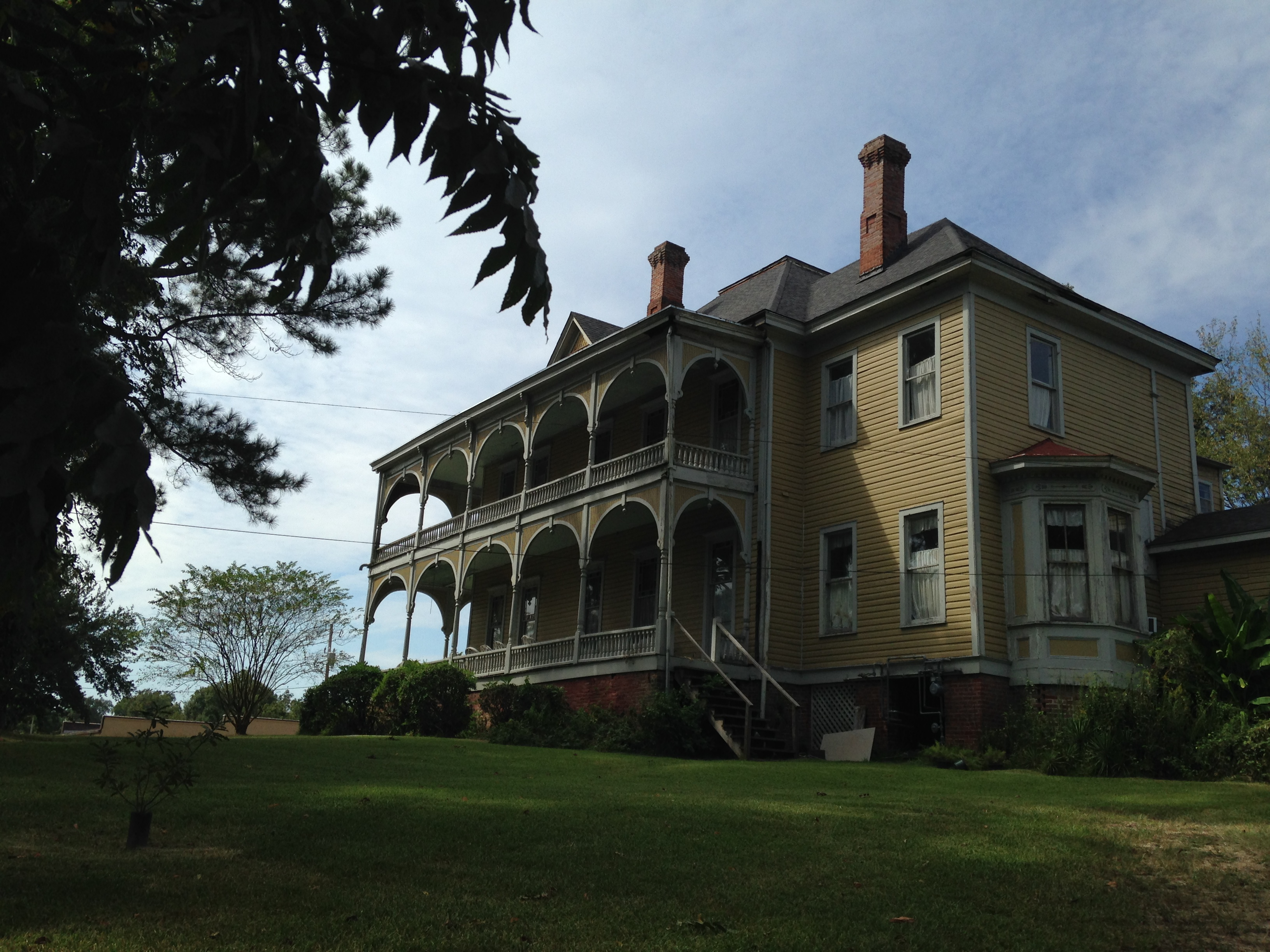
- The A.J. Lewis House in 2016

- Location within Mississippi Location within the United States
- Location: South Magnolia and Lewis Streets, Edwards, Mississippi
- Coordinates: 32°19′48″N 90°36′14″W
- Area: less than one acre
- Built: 1895
- Architectural style: Queen Anne
- NRHP reference No.: 83000952
- Added to NRHP: August 4, 1983

The A.J. Lewis House is a historic mansion in Edwards, Mississippi, U.S.. It has been listed on the National Register of Historic Places since August 4, 1983.

== History ==
It was built between 1892 until 1895 for Alonzo James Lewis, a veteran of the Confederate States Army during the American Civil War who became a wealthy businessman after the war. It was designed in the Queen Anne architectural style, with "an arcaded double-tiered veranda."
