= Spengler–Thomas Building =

- U.S. National Register of Historic Places
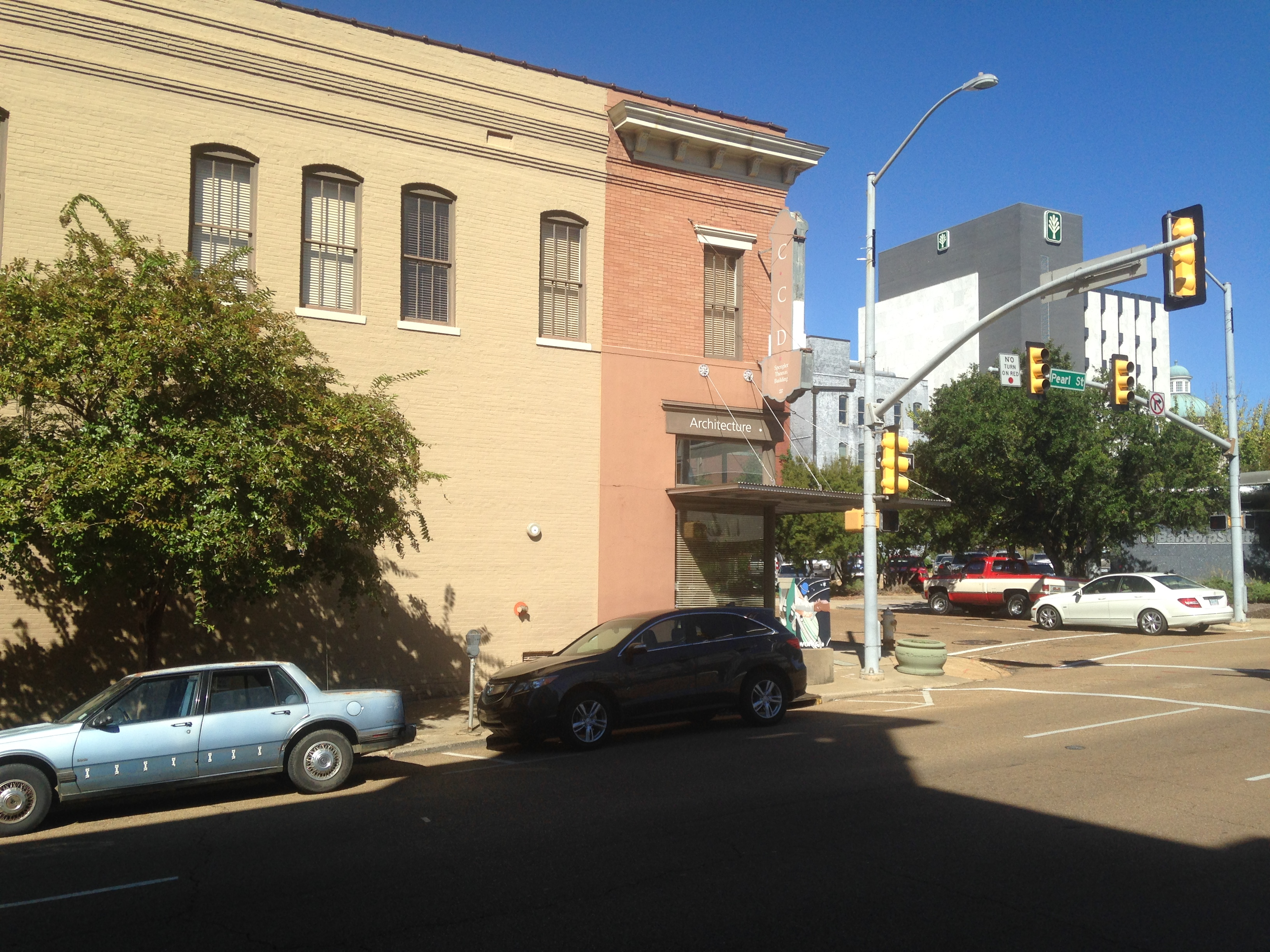

- Location within Mississippi
- Location: 129 S. President, Jackson, Mississippi
- Coordinates: 32°18′0″N 90°10′55″W
- Area: less than one acre
- Built: 1909
- NRHP reference No.: 03000387
- Added to NRHP: May 9, 2003

The Spengler–Thomas Building is a historic 2-story brick commercial building in Jackson, Mississippi. It was built in 1909 and was home to Bowers Brothers Dry Goods in 1910, then Maloney Brothers Dry Goods and Grocery which was joined by S.N. Thomas Department Store on one side of the building. Southern Business College and a Masonic Lodge were located upstairs by 1917. S.N. Thomas's Sons Company took over the building except for the lodge and occupied it until the 1990s. In 2000 the building was bought and restored in a project completed in 2002. The building was added to the National Register of Historic Places on May 9, 2003. It is located at 129 South President Street.

== See also ==
- National Register of Historic Places listings in Hinds County, Mississippi
