= The Cedars (Clinton, Mississippi) =

Historic house in Mississippi, United States

- U.S. National Register of Historic Places
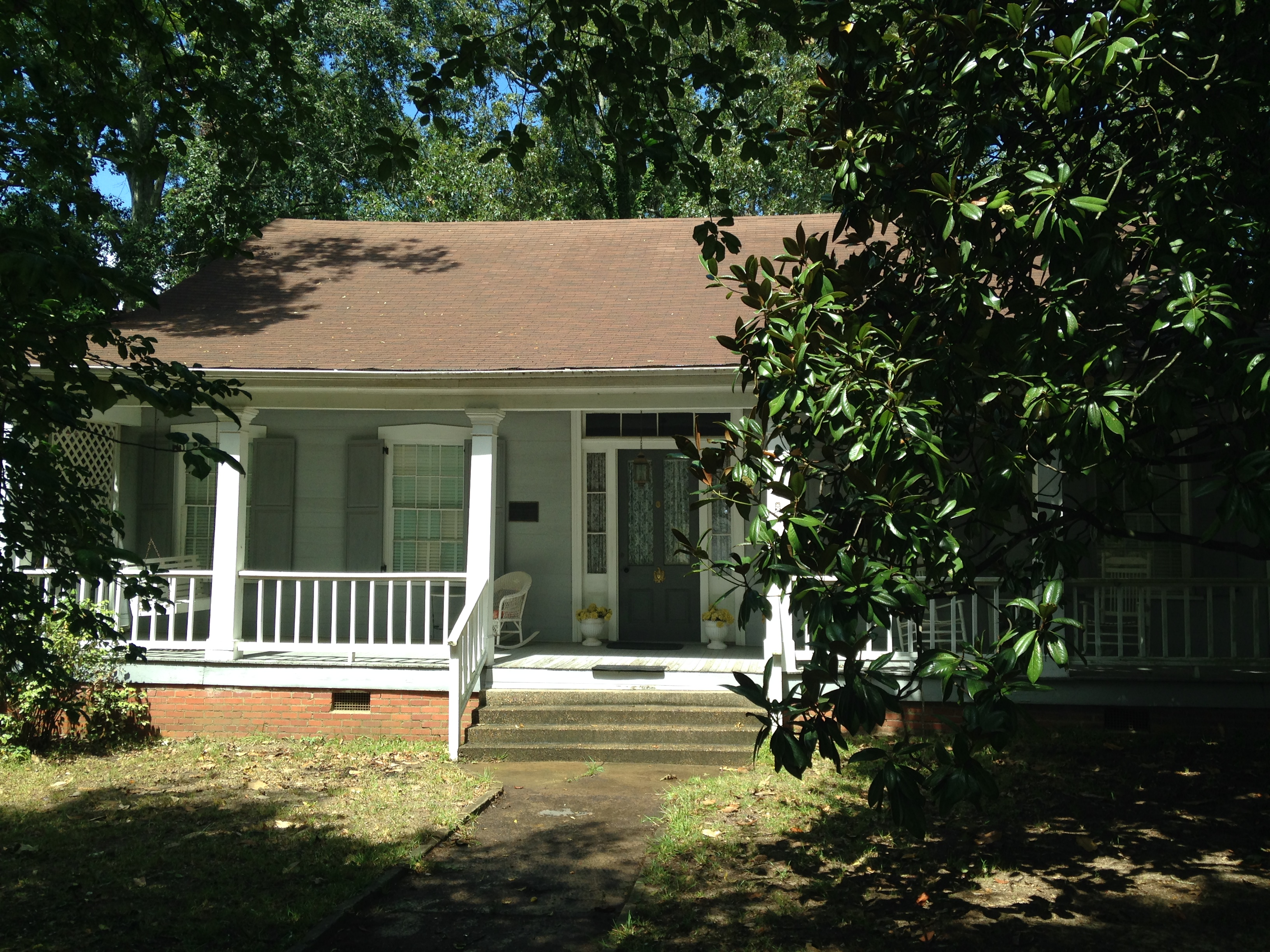
- The Cedars in Clinton, Mississippi

- Location within Mississippi
- Location: 405 East College Street; Clinton, Mississippi
- Coordinates: 32°20′16″N 90°19′28″W
- Built: c. 1835
- Architectural style: Greek revival
- NRHP reference No.: 77000787
- Added to NRHP: January 4, 1977

The Cedars (also Cedar Grove) is a private home in Clinton, Mississippi. Built around 1839, it is listed on the National Register of Historic Places, and is one of the oldest extant houses in Hinds County.

Named for a grove of more than fifty cedar trees located on the 5-acre (2.0 ha) property, the one-story frame house was built as a Greek revival cottage, and is typical of the simple but spacious cottages once popular in Mississippi.

== History ==
The original property was owned by pioneer settlers Minerva Fitz Morgan and Jacob B. Morgan.

The exact date of construction of the home is unknown, though land records indicate that by 1839 there was a structure on the site, and architectural evidence places the period of the house at between 1835 and 1850.

The house changed hands at least five times during its first twenty years of existence. In 1859, Emile Menger, a professor of music at Mississippi College in Clinton, arrived from Germany with his family and took possession of home and property. The Mengers sold the house and property in 1903 to Patrick Henry Eager, a professor of English and acting president of Mississippi College, who added an addition to the home that same year. The name of the house was changed by Mrs. Eager from "Cedar Grove" to "The Cedars" to avoid confusion with her family home "Cedar Grove" in Aberdeen, Mississippi. The Eager family owned the home for 72 years, during which time the property was divided and reduced in size to 0.75 acres (0.30 ha). The Cedars was sold in 1975 to James T. Currie and Patricia Sumners Currie, who renovated and restored The Cedars.

The home has been included on the "Walking Tour of Historic Clinton", and was opened to the public during Clinton's Bicentennial Pilgrimage in 1976.

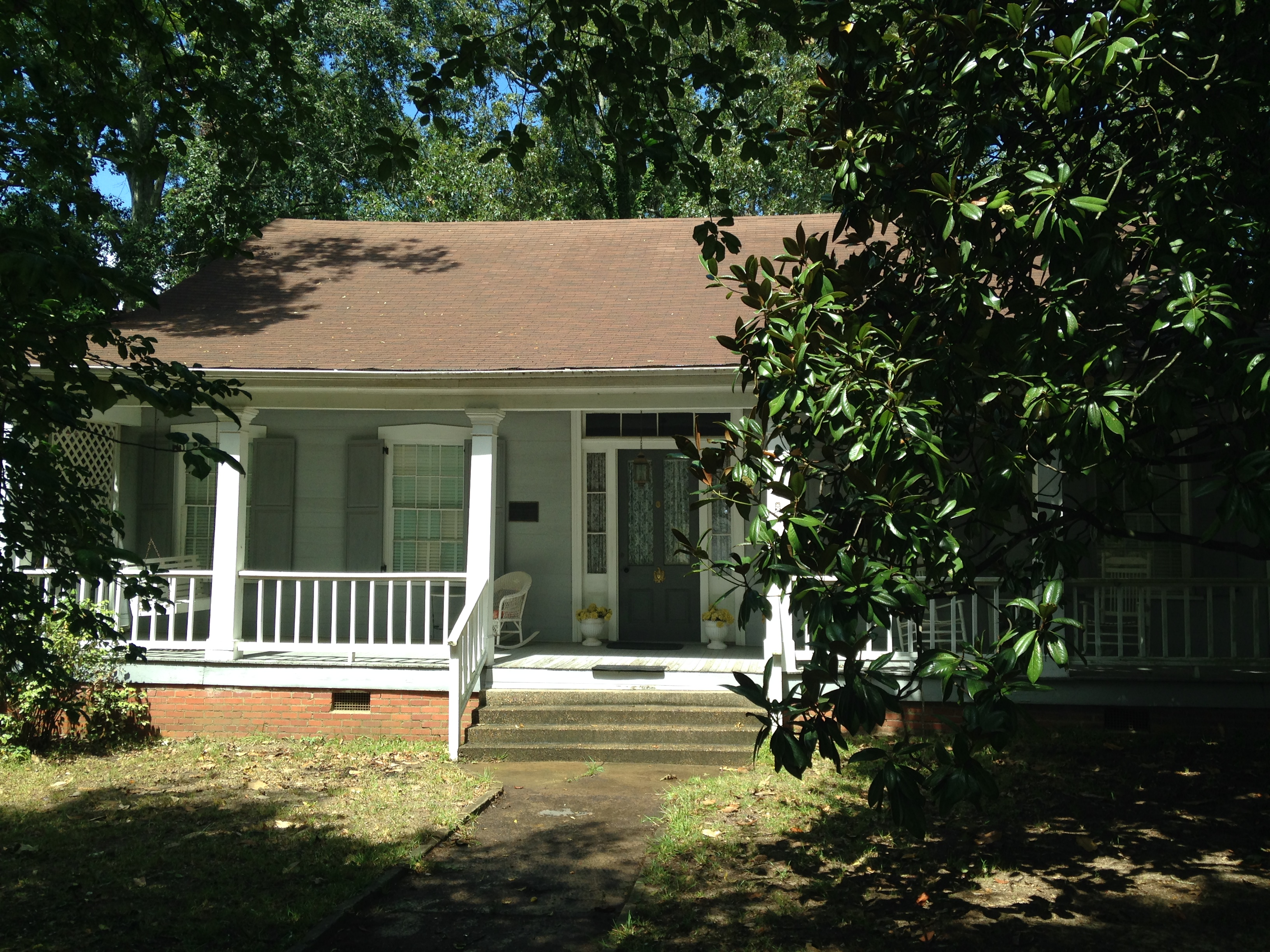
Front

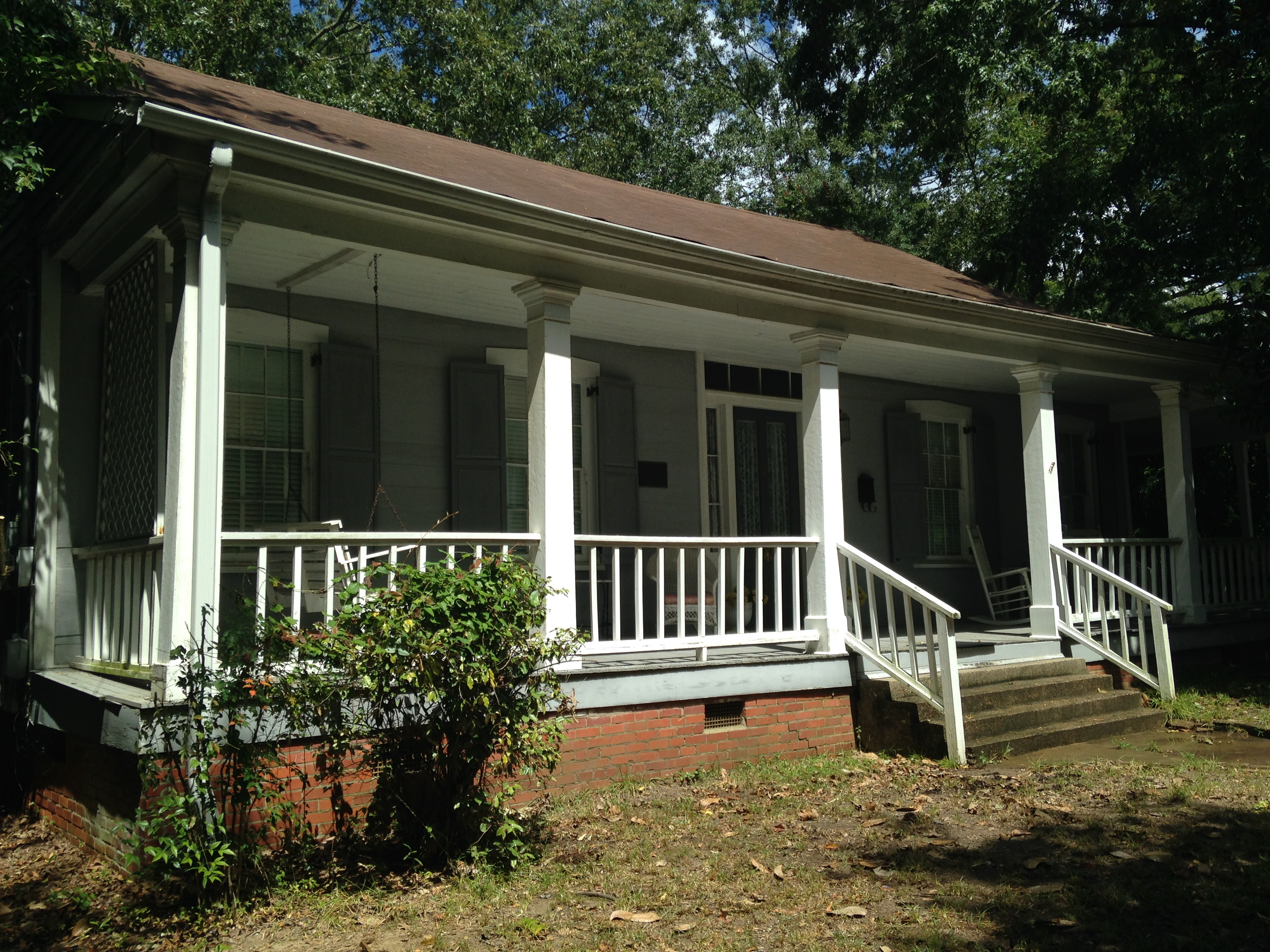
Side

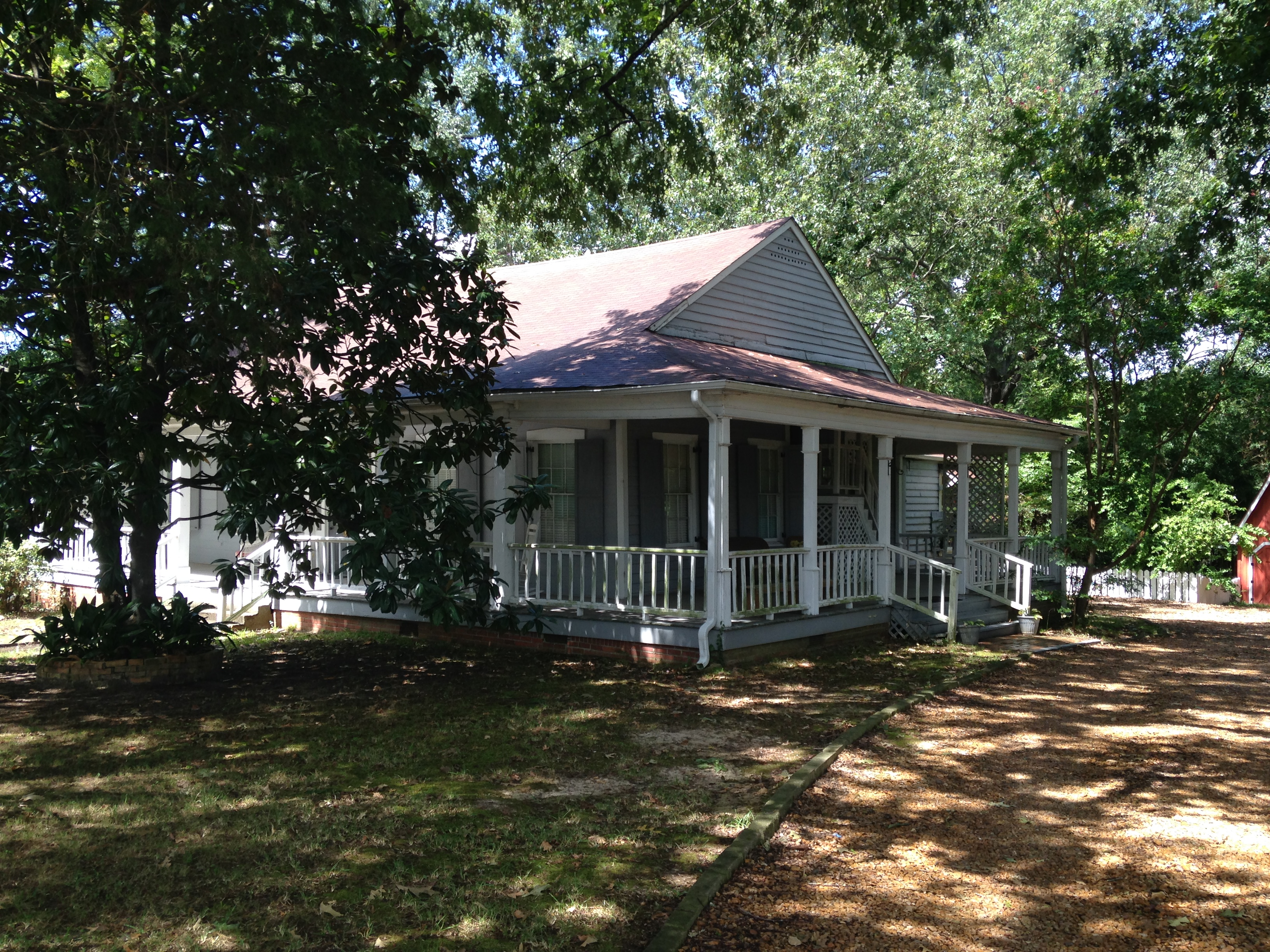
Back

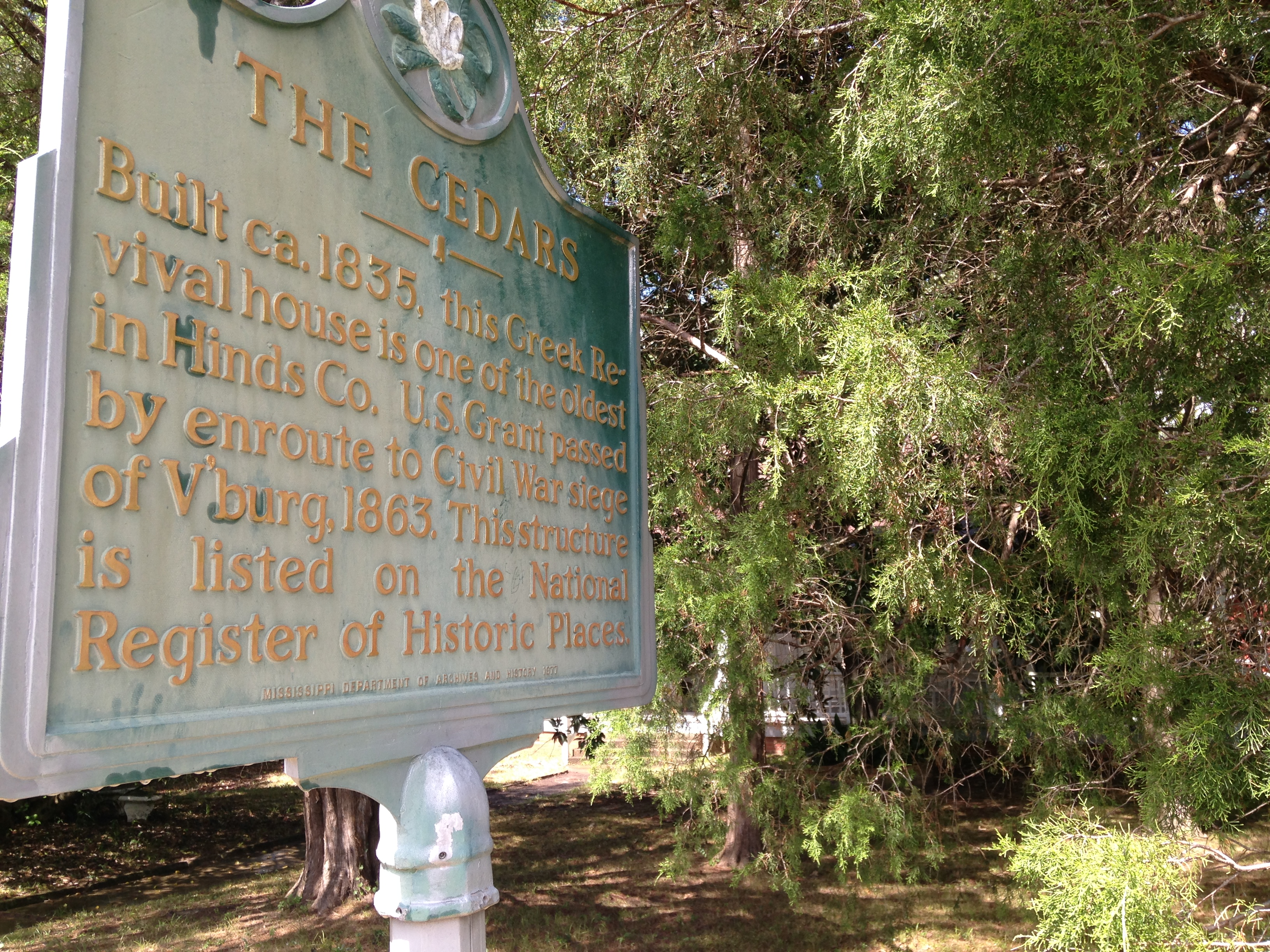
Historic plaque
