= Joseph Henry Morris House =

Historic house in Mississippi, United States

- U.S. National Register of Historic Places
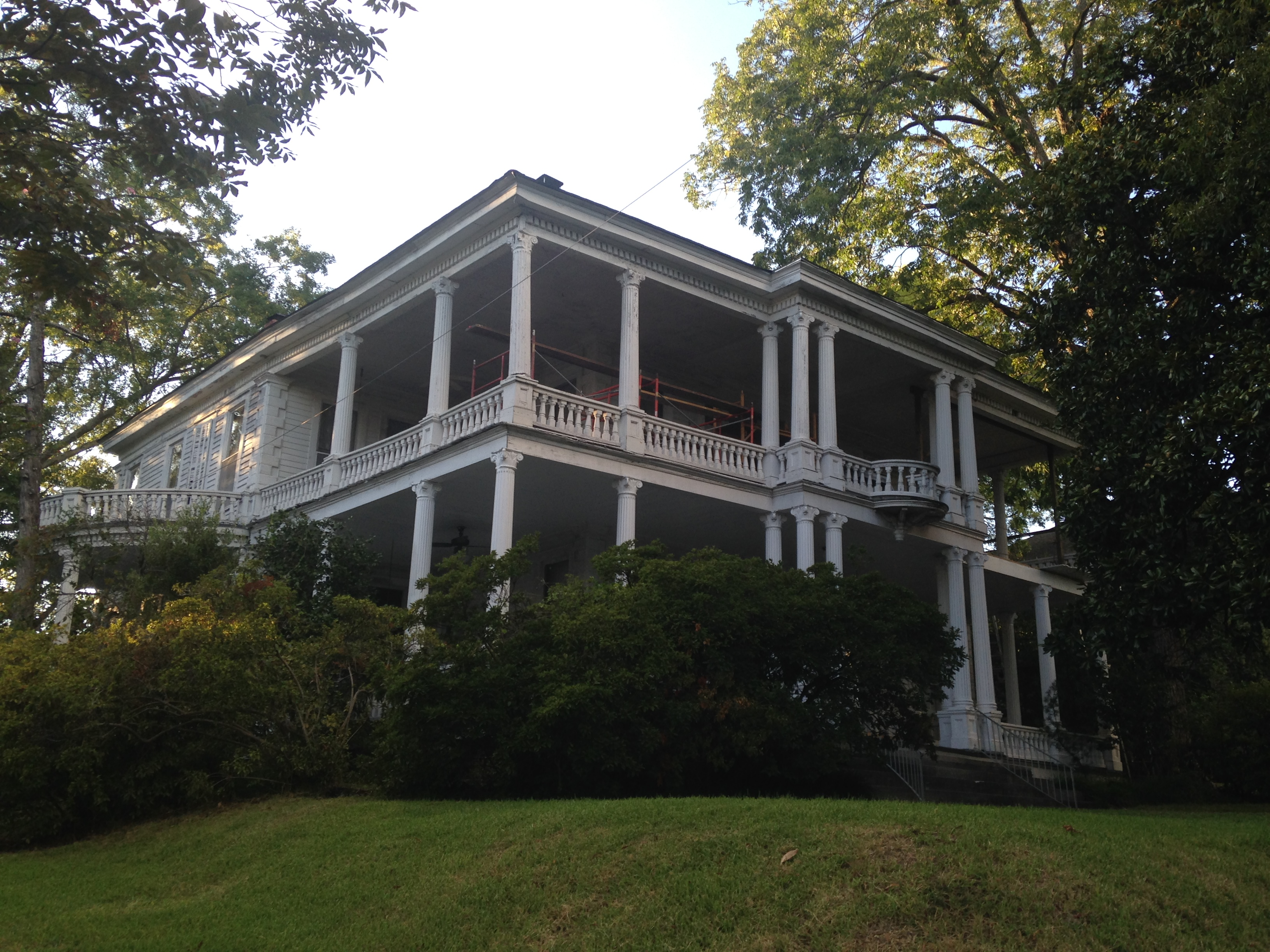

- Location within Mississippi Location within the United States
- Location: 305 North State Street, Jackson, Mississippi
- Coordinates: 32°18′13″N 90°10′47″W
- Area: less than one acre
- Built: 1893
- Architectural style: Classical Revival, Neo-Classical Revival
- NRHP reference No.: 83000953
- Added to NRHP: August 11, 1983

The Joseph Henry Morris House is a historic mansion in Jackson, Mississippi, U.S.. It was built in 1891-1893 for Joseph Henry Morris, a veteran of the Confederate States Army during the American Civil War who later worked as an "agent" for the Illinois Central Railroad and founded an ice company. The Morris family had owned the land for generations. It was designed in the Classical Revival architectural style. It has been listed on the National Register of Historic Places since August 11, 1983.
