= Warren-Guild-Simmons House =

Historic house in Mississippi, United States

- U.S. National Register of Historic Places
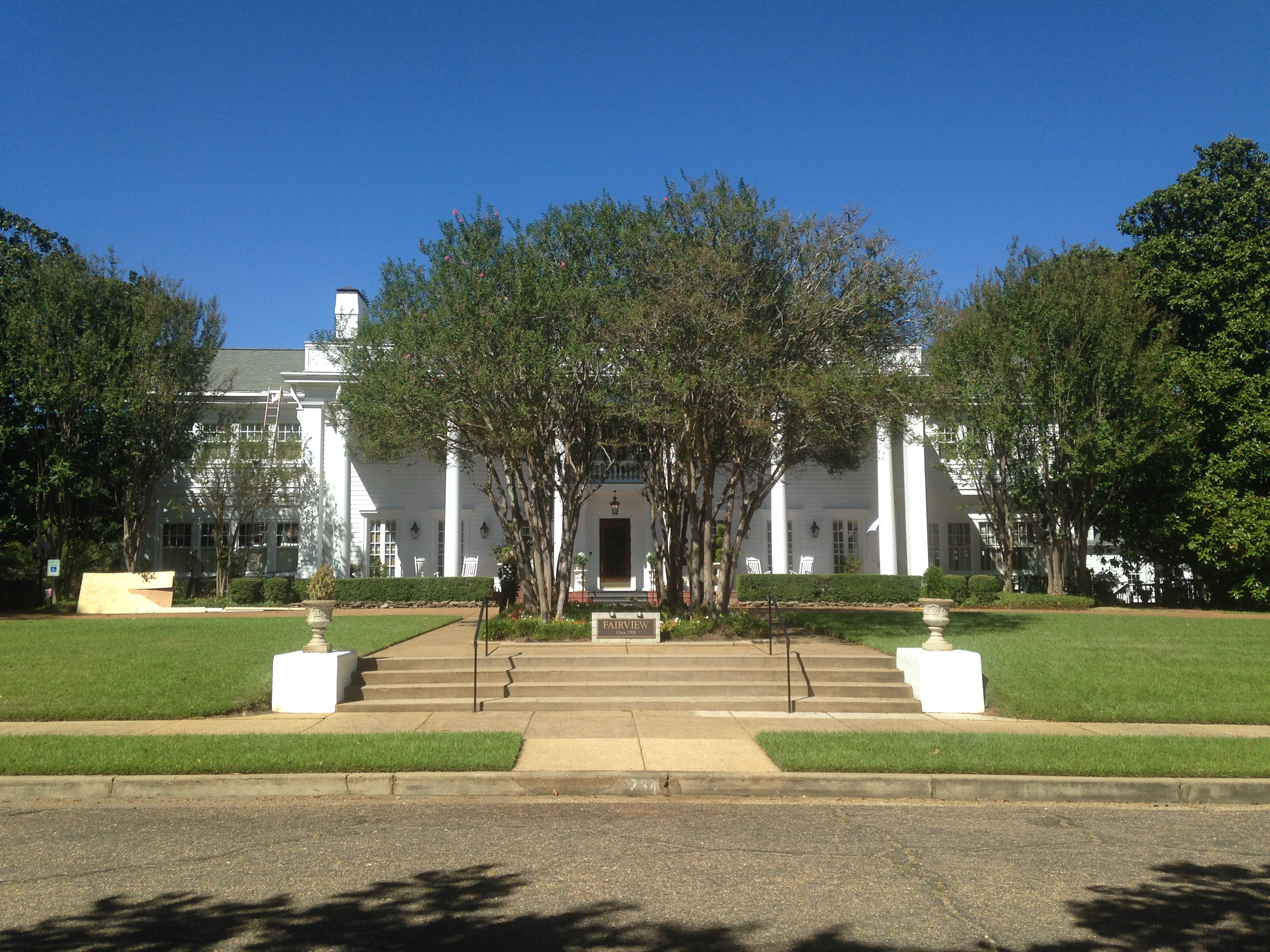
- The Warren-Guild-Simmons House in 2016

- Location within Mississippi Location within the United States
- Location: 734 Fairview Street, Jackson, Mississippi
- Coordinates: 32°19′13″N 90°10′36″W
- Area: 2.8 acres (1.1 ha)
- Built: 1909
- Architect: Spencer & Powers
- Architectural style: Colonial Revival
- NRHP reference No.: 79001312
- Added to NRHP: January 11, 1979

The Warren-Guild-Simmons House, also known as Fairview Inn, is a historic mansion in Jackson, Mississippi, U.S..

== History ==
The house was built in 1908 for Cyrus C. Warren, the vice president of the Warren-Goodwin Lumber Company. Felix Gunter, the president of the Jackson Board of Trade, was the homeowner from 1913 to 1921, when it was purchased by W. E. Guild, the treasurer of the Finkbine Lumber Company. D. C. Simmons, the president of the Bank of Utica and the Utica Lumber and Gin Company, was the homeowner from 1930 to 1964. It was inherited by their son William L. Simmons in the 1970s. In the 1950s, he had founded the Jackson Citizens' Council, a white supremacist organization.

The house was later renovated to become a boutique hotel known as the Fairview Inn, which still operates today.

== Architectural significance ==
The house was designed in the Colonial Revival style by the architectural firm Spencer & Powers. It has been listed on the National Register of Historic Places since January 11, 1979.
