= Saint Mark's Episcopal Church (Raymond, Mississippi) =

Historic church in Mississippi, United States

- U.S. National Register of Historic Places
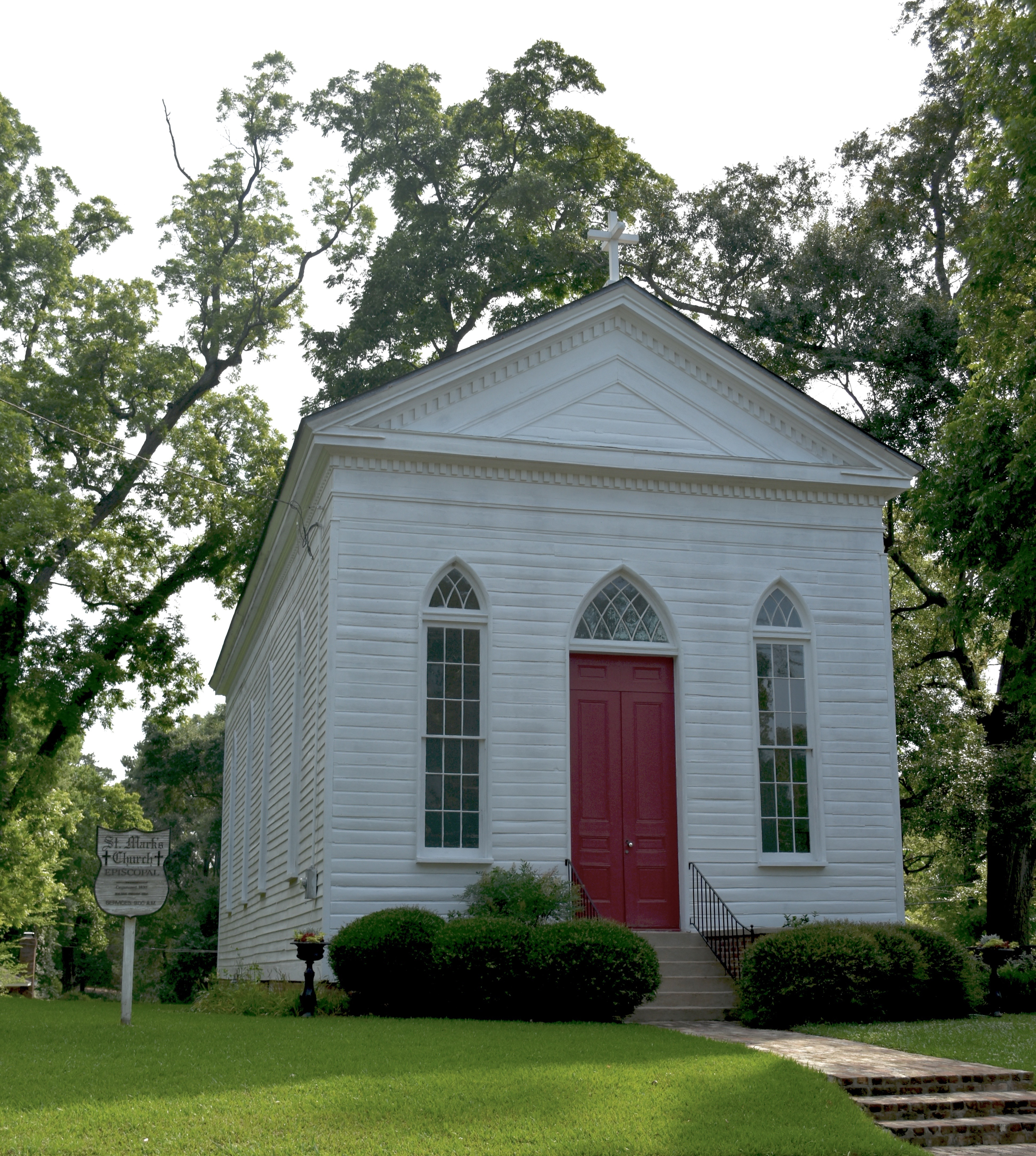

- Location within Mississippi Location within the United States
- Location: W. Main and N. Oak Sts., Raymond, Mississippi
- Coordinates: 32°15′38″N 90°25′26″W
- Area: less than one acre
- Built: 1854
- Architectural style: Greek Revival, Gothic Revival
- MPS: Raymond and Vicinity MRA
- NRHP reference No.: 86001712
- Added to NRHP: July 15, 1986

Saint Mark's Episcopal Church is a historic Episcopal church at W. Main and N. Oak Streets in Raymond, Mississippi.

It was built in 1854 and added to the National Register in 1986.
