= Woodrow Wilson Bridge (Jackson, Mississippi) =

- Wilson, Woodrow, Bridge
- U.S. National Register of Historic Places
- Mississippi Landmark
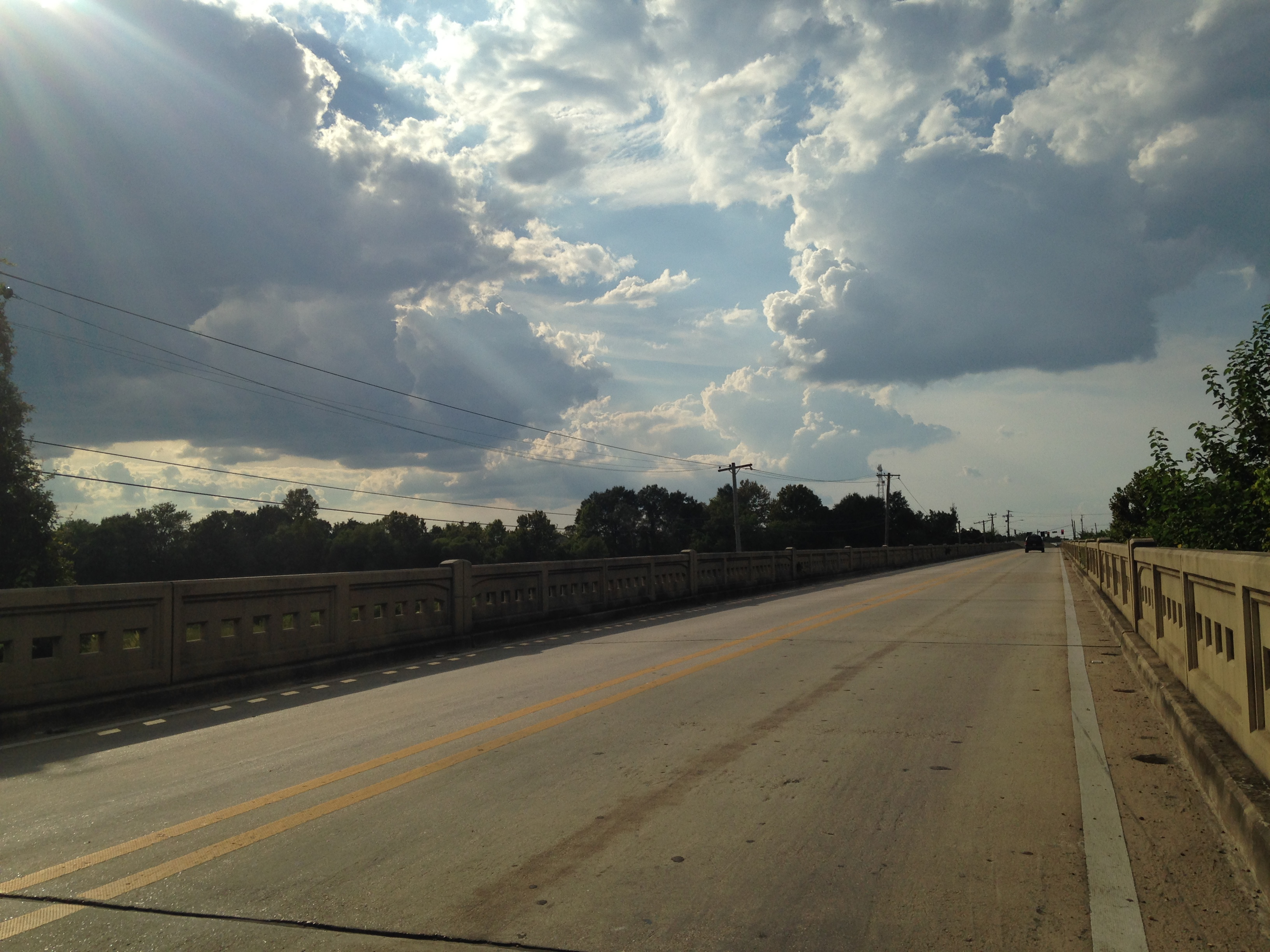
- Woodrow Wilson Bridge in 2016

- Location within Mississippi Location within the United States
- Location: Spans Pearl River on Silas Brown St., Jackson, Mississippi
- Coordinates: 32°17′22″N 90°10′44″W
- Built: 1925
- Architectural style: Open-spandrel concrete arch
- MPS: Historic Bridges of Mississippi TR
- NRHP reference No.: 88002485
- USMS No.: 049-JAC-0771-NR-ML

Significant dates
- Added to NRHP: November 16, 1988
- Designated USMS: August 4, 1987

The Woodrow Wilson Bridge in Jackson, Mississippi, is an open-spandrel concrete arch bridge over the Pearl River. It was built in 1925. It was designated a Mississippi Landmark in 1987 and listed on the National Register of Historic Places in 1988. It has been demolished and replaced, but a section has been kept and placed as a memorial at an overlook of the Pearl River.
