= Millsaps-Buie House =

Historic house in Mississippi, United States

- U.S. National Register of Historic Places
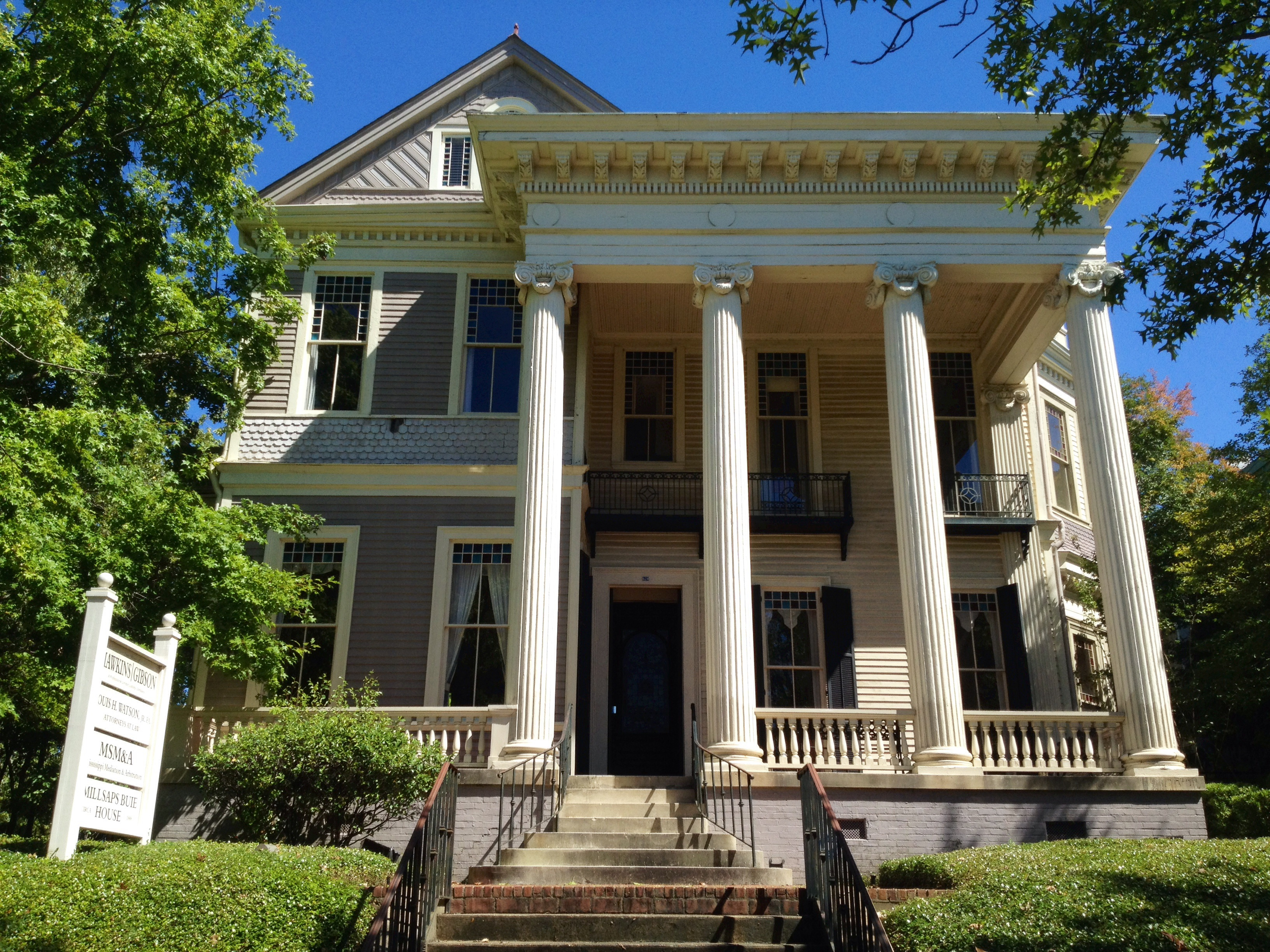
- The Millsaps-Buie House in 2013

- Location within Mississippi Location within the United States
- Location: 628 North State Street, Jackson, Mississippi
- Coordinates: 32°18′18″N 90°10′43″W
- Area: 1 acre (0.40 ha)
- Built: 1888
- Architectural style: Queen Anne
- NRHP reference No.: 73001014
- Added to NRHP: June 19, 1973

The Millsaps-Buie House is a historic mansion in Jackson, Mississippi, U.S.. It was built for Major Reuben Webster Millsaps, a veteran of the Confederate States Army during the American Civil War who became a wealthy cotton broker and banker after the war. It was inherited by his nephew, Webster Millsaps Buie, in 1916. The house was designed in the Queen Anne architectural style. It has been listed on the National Register of Historic Places since June 19, 1973.
