= Shelton House (Raymond, Mississippi) =

Historic house in Mississippi, United States

- U.S. National Register of Historic Places
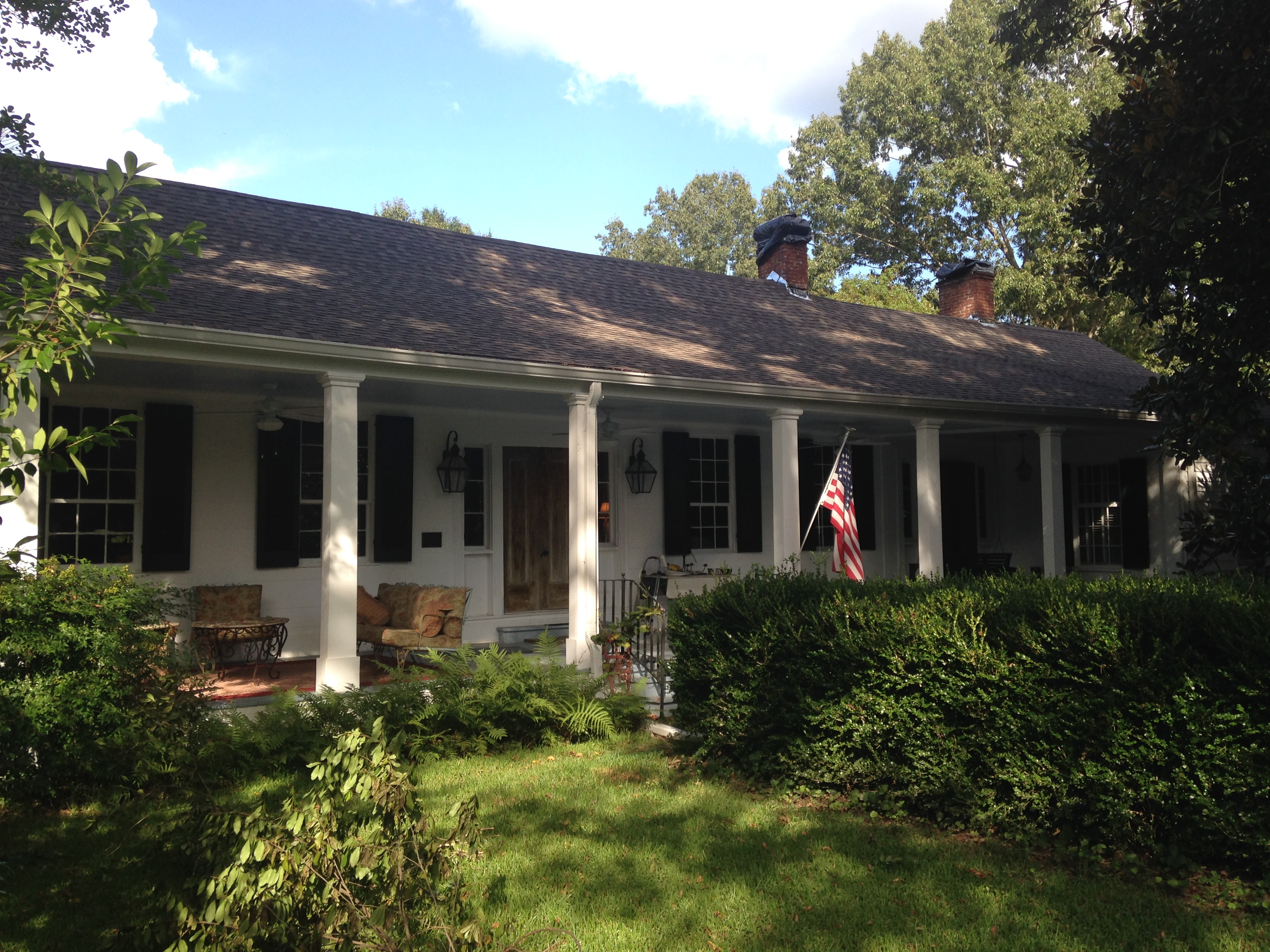
- The Shelton House in 2016

- Location within Mississippi
- Location: 561 West Main Street, Raymond, Mississippi
- Coordinates: 32°16′00″N 90°25′40″W
- Area: 4 acres (1.6 ha)
- Built: 1830
- Architectural style: Greek Revival
- MPS: Raymond and Vicinity MRA
- NRHP reference No.: 86001711
- Added to NRHP: July 15, 1986

The Shelton House, also known as the Holliday-Beaufait House, is a historic house in Raymond, Mississippi. It was built in 1830 and designed in the Greek Revival architectural style. It is listed on the National Register of Historic Places.

== History ==
The house was built circa 1830, and remodelled around 1850. It was the home of Judge Shelton during the American Civil War of 1861–1865. In 1919, it was purchased by Thomas Monroe Holliday and his wife, née Lucretia Beaufait. It remained in the Holliday family in the 1980s.

== Architectural significance ==
The house was designed in the Greek Revival architectural style. It has been listed on the National Register of Historic Places since July 15, 1986.
