= Dupree-Ratliff House =

Historic house in Mississippi, United States

- Dupree--Ratliff House
- U.S. National Register of Historic Places
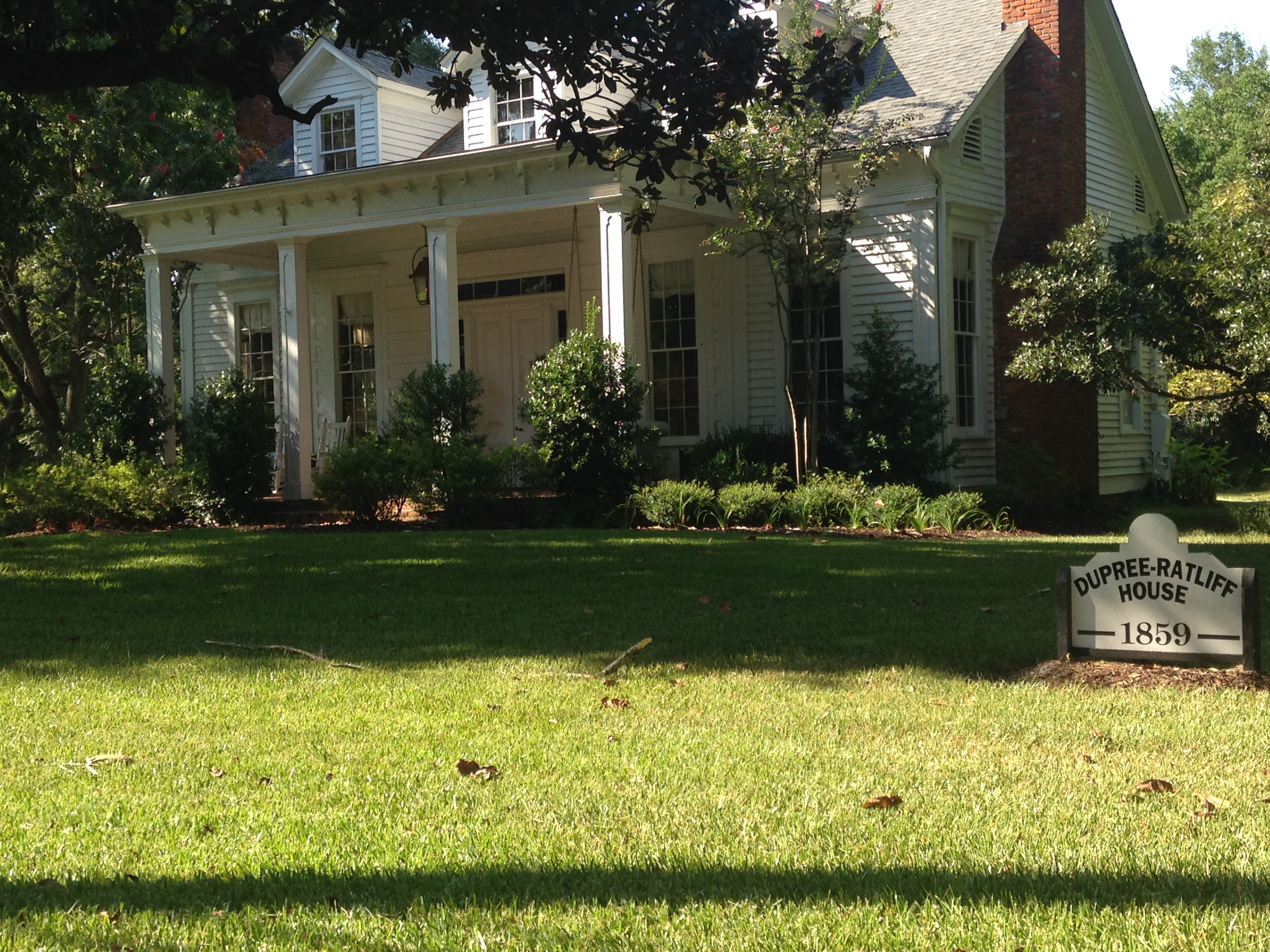
- The Dupree-Ratliff House in 2016

- Location within Mississippi Location within the United States
- Location: 101 Dupree Street, Raymond, Mississippi
- Coordinates: 32°15′43″N 90°25′33″W
- Area: 5 acres (2.0 ha)
- Built: 1853
- Architectural style: Greek Revival, Italianate
- MPS: Raymond and Vicinity MRA
- NRHP reference No.: 86001704
- Added to NRHP: July 15, 1986

The Dupree-Ratliff House is a historic house in Raymond, Mississippi, U.S..

== History ==
The house was built in 1853 for Dr. H.T.T. Dupree and his wife, Margaret Fairchild. It belonged to the Barksdale family in the 1960s, followed by the Thrashes in the 1980s.

== Architectural significance ==
The house was designed in the Greek Revival and Italianate architectural styles. It has been listed on the National Register of Historic Places since July 15, 1986.
