= Virden-Patton House =

Historic house in Mississippi, United States

- U.S. National Register of Historic Places
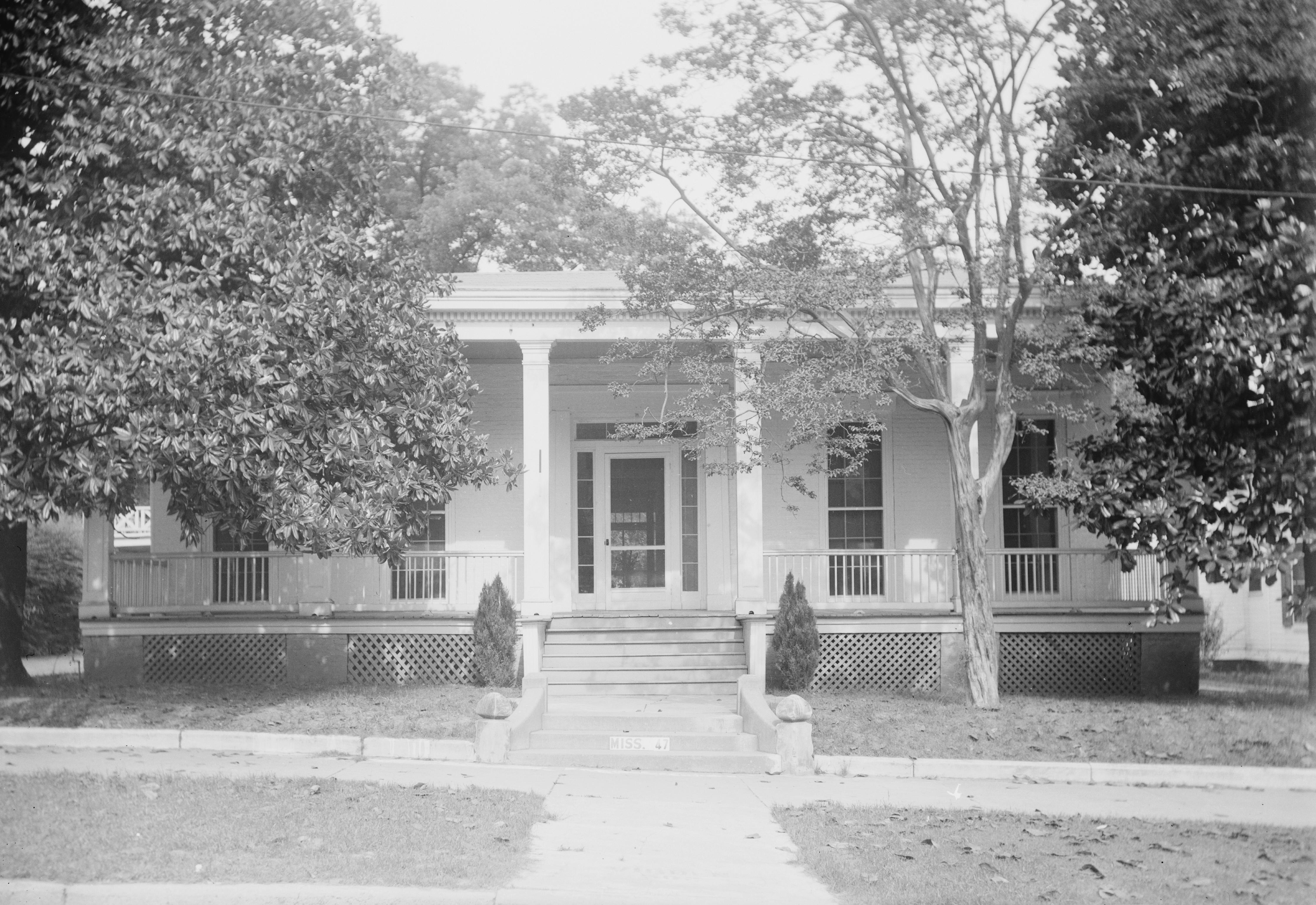
- The Virden-Patton House in 1936

- Location within Mississippi
- Location: 512 N. State Street, Jackson, Mississippi
- Coordinates: 32°18′13″N 90°10′44″W
- Area: less than one acre
- Built: 1849
- Architectural style: Greek Revival
- NRHP reference No.: 83003962
- Added to NRHP: December 16, 1983

The Virden-Patton House is a historic cottage in Jackson, Mississippi.

== History ==
The house was built in 1849 for Alexander Virden, a merchant from Delaware, and his wife, Ruth Anna Virden; they were second cousins. It was designed in the Greek Revival architectural style. During the American Civil War of 1861–1865, Virden served in the Confederate States Army. After he died in 1892, his widow lived in the house until her death in 1916. Their son, Samuel Virden, inherited the house in 1917, and he sold it to John W. Patton, Jr., in 1934.

The house has been listed on the National Register of Historic Places since December 16, 1983.
