= Porter House (Raymond, Mississippi) =

Historic house in Mississippi, United States

- U.S. National Register of Historic Places
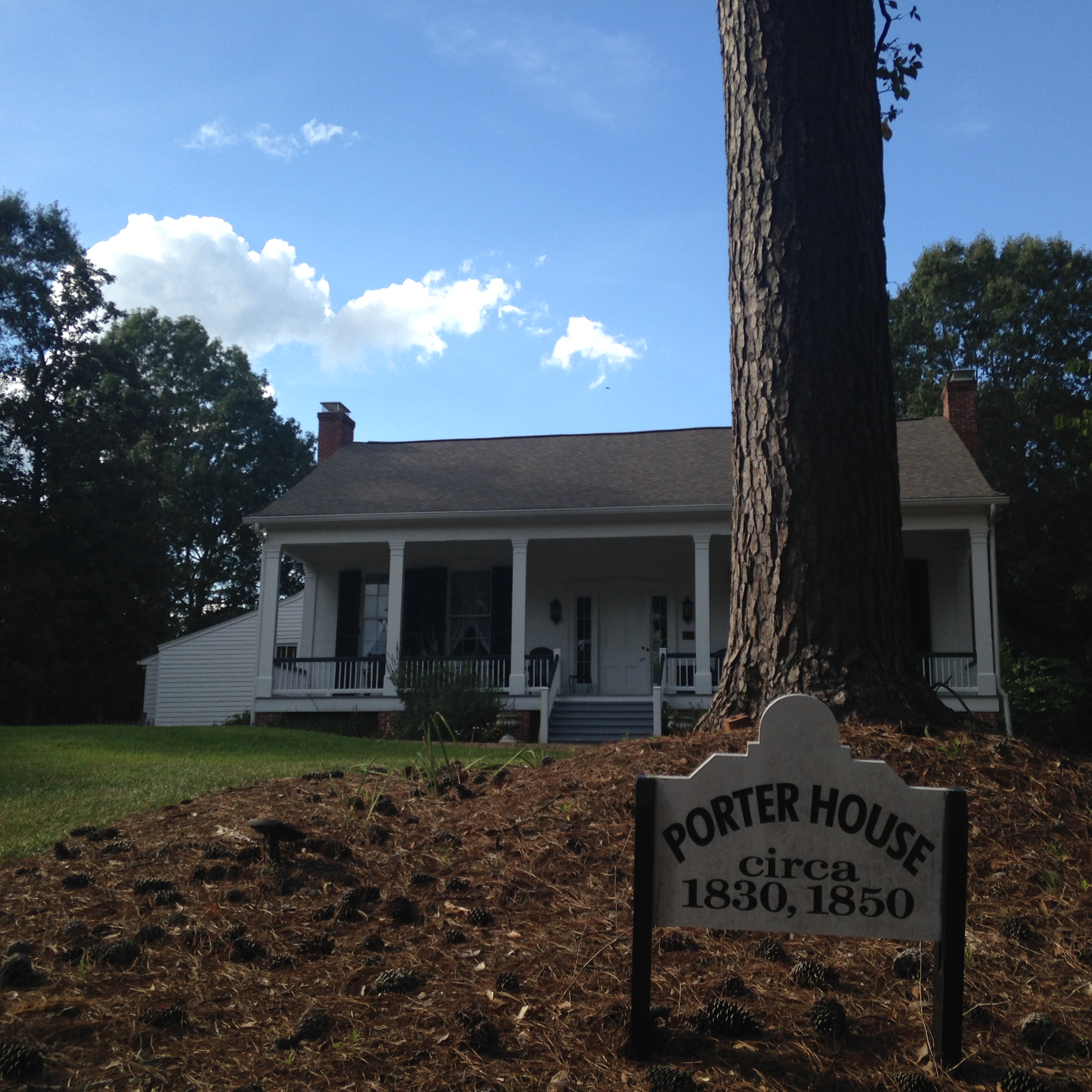

- Location within Mississippi Location within the United States
- Nearest city: Raymond, Mississippi
- Coordinates: 32°15′41″N 90°25′21″W
- Built: c. 1850
- Architectural style: vernacular Greek Revival
- MPS: Raymond and Vicinity MRA
- NRHP reference No.: 86001702
- Added to NRHP: July 15, 1986

Porter House, also known as The Farm or Porter Family Homestead, in Raymond, Mississippi, is a vernacular Greek Revival house that was built in c. 1850. It was listed on the National Register of Historic Places in 1986 at its original location, about three miles southeast of Raymond. It was moved to a location in Raymond in 2004 and has been renovated.

In 1986 it was deemed "architecturally significant because it is the only example of a one-room deep, ante-bellum, Greek Revival cottage" in the Raymond area that was surveyed.
