= Hinds County Courthouse (Raymond, Mississippi) =

- U.S. National Register of Historic Places
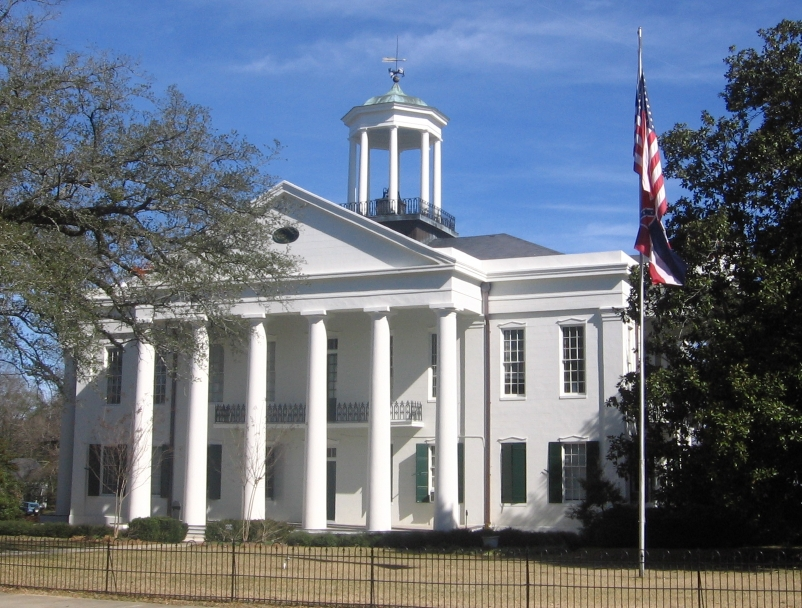
- Raymond Courthouse

- Location within Mississippi Location within the United States
- Location: 127 Main Street, West, Raymond, Mississippi
- Coordinates: 32°15′37″N 90°25′24″W
- Built: 1857
- Architect: Weldon, George; Weldon, Thomas
- Architectural style: Greek Revival
- MPS: Raymond and Vicinity MRA
- NRHP reference No.: 86001706
- Added to NRHP: July 15, 1986

Hinds County Courthouse in Raymond, Mississippi, also known as Raymond Courthouse, was built in 1857. It was listed on the National Register of Historic Places in 1986 and is part of the Raymond Historic District. The two-story scored stucco building includes a hipped roof and porticoes.
