= Yerger =

Yerger is a surname of German origin. Notable people with the surname include:

- Edward M. Yerger (1828–1875), American newspaper editor and murderer
- George Shall Yerger (1808–1860), American jurist
- Henry Clay Yerger (1860–1936), American educator
- Kathleen Yerger Johnstone (1906–1996), American conchologist
- Mark C. Yerger (1955–2016), American author
- Michael Yerger (born 1998), American television personality
- William G. Yerger (?–1899), American politician
- William Yerger (1816–1872), American jurist
- William Yerger Humphreys (1890–1933), American lawyer and politician

== See also ==
- Jerger
