= Joseph G. Crane =

Mayor of Jackson, Mississippi in 1869

Joseph G. Crane (died June 8, 1869) was a Union Army breveted colonel who was the appointed mayor of Jackson, Mississippi. He was assassinated.

Crane was stabbed to death on the capitol steps by Edward M. Yerger, a former Confederate Army officer who owned a newspaper, the Evening Journal in Baltimore. Under Crane’s authority a piano had been seized from Yerger’s family to satisfy a tax assessment. After military officials arrested his assailant, a writ of Habeas corpus was filed and eventually appealed in the Ex parte Yerger case to the United States Supreme Court. Yerger was represented by his uncle, William Yerger, who had served on the Mississippi Supreme Court in the 1850s. After the justices' decision, a deal was made and he was released to civil authorities, bonded out, and moved to Baltimore, Maryland. He was never tried.

== See also ==
- List of mayors of Jackson, Mississippi
