= Charles Caldwell (politician) =

American politician (1830 or 1831–1875)

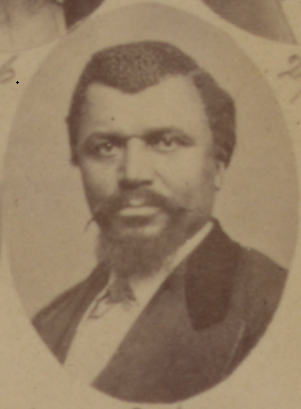
Charles Caldwell in 1874

Charles Caldwell (1830 or 1831 – December 30, 1875) was a Reconstruction era political and state militia leader in Mississippi. He held office as a state senator and county commissioner before being assassinated in 1875.

A former slave, he was a delegate to Mississippi's 1868 Constitutional Convention. He worked as a blacksmith in Clinton, Mississippi, a small town about 12 miles from Jackson in Hinds County, Mississippi.

Political violence in Clinton included the Clinton Riot after a political rally of African Americans. Governor Adelbert Ames authorized a militia in response and put Caldwell in charge of it in Clinton but later backed down and disbanded it.

The U.S. Congress reported on election violence and Caldwell's assassination. A plaque commemorates his life.

== See also ==
- African American officeholders from the end of the Civil War until before 1900
