= Jackson/Hinds Library System =

Coordinates: 32.301698°N 90.179419°W

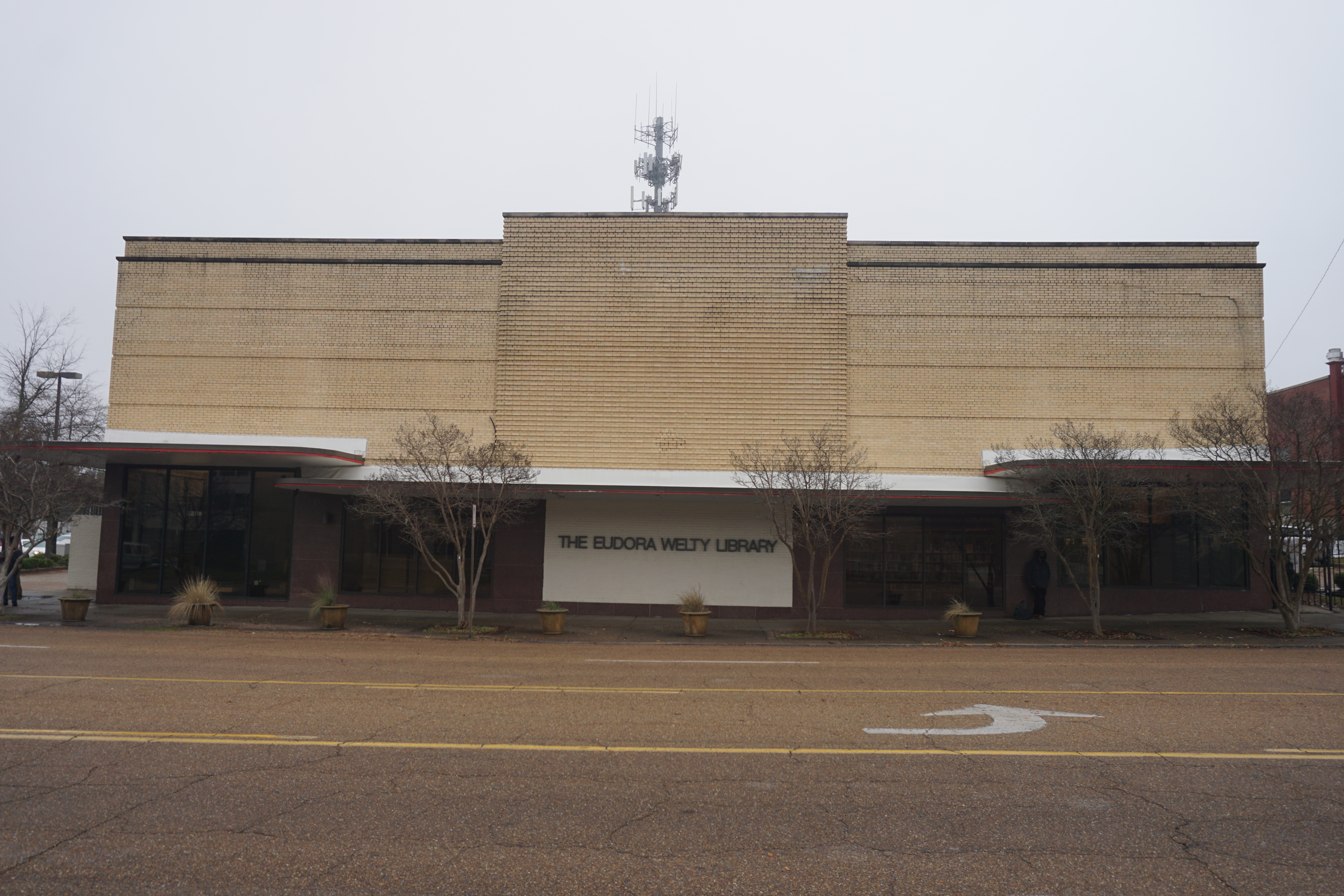
Eudora Welty Library, the main library (2018)

Jackson/Hinds Library System (JHLS) is the public library system of Jackson and Hinds County in Mississippi.

== Branches ==
Jackson

- Margaret Walker Alexander Library
  - It is located in leased space in a building. In 2024, art installations were added. As of 2026 it was the most utilized library branch in Jackson and after the library in Clinton, the most utilized branch in the system. That year, the owner of the building suggested that it could be sold to the City of Jackson.
- R. G. Bolden/Anna Bell Moore Library
- Medgar Evers Library
  - In July 2023 the library temporarily closed due to an air conditioning problem.
- Fannie Lou Hamer Library
  - In 2023 the Hamer Library remained open while leaking issues had occurred.
- Willie Morris Library
- Richard Wright Library - Closed in March of 2020 for repairs for plumbing repairs and all materials were removed in July of 2021. It is adjacent to Key Elementary School. By 2025 it had reopened and some murals had been added.

Not in Jackson

- Ella Bess Austin Library (Terry)
- Beverly J. Brown Library (Byram)
  - It is behind the Byram City Hall. Beginning in 2021 it was in a temporary building. As of 2026 it was still there.
- Lois A. Flagg Library (Edwards)
- Annie Thompson Jeffers Library (Bolton)
- Evelyn Taylor Majure Library (Utica)
- Quisenberry Library (Clinton)
  - In 2018 the Clinton city government, citing problems with the sanitary condition, closed the library. It stated that it would reopen if the library system revised the terms of the library lease. The two entities came to an agreement and it reopened that year.
- Raymond Public Library (Raymond)
  - It is located at the Hinds Courthouse Annex.

=== Former ===
- Eudora Welty Library - The former main library was located in what was once a Sears building, built circa 1938. In 2018 the second story has a study area and over 50,000 books. By 2018 the building had multiple maintenance and mold problems, with stairwells that, according to The Clarion Ledger, "are too dangerous to navigate", as well as non-functional elevators, meaning that the second floor was not accessible for safety reasons. Additionally there were sewage and water leaks. By 2024, the federal government of the United States gave a grant to aid in moving the library, worth $3,750,000 As part of redevelopment plans, the original building was to be razed. A park is to go in its place.
- Charles Tisdale Library (Jackson) - It opened in 1976. Its namesake was Charles Tisdale, who published a newspaper. Prior to its closure it was the third busiest library system in terms of book checkouts; in 2016 patrons checked out over 16,700 books. In 2017 it had experienced flooding and black mold and was closed by the library system. By 2018 over 34,000 books had been destroyed in the library because loss of power and additional flooding caused the mold to intensify. In 2019 the library system decided to move to a new site, with a tentative plan for one next to McWillie Elementary School. The Jackson city government acquired the former building from the library system in late 2019. By October 2020 unauthorized persons broke into the library and additional flooding had occurred, so the Jackson city government took measures to board up the building. However, in 2021 break-ins and flooding occurred again. That year the library system made plans for a new site. Ashby Foote, council member of Ward 1 of Jackson, criticized the condition of the current Tisdale library.
