= Jerger =

Jerger is a German surname, originally a patronymic from Jörg (George). Notable people with the surname include:

- Alfred Jerger (1889–1976), Austrian opera singer, conductor and professor
- Anton Jerger, Austrian philatelist
- Natalie Enright Jerger, American computer scientist

== See also ==
- Berger
- Yerger
- Jürgens
