= Summers Hotel and Subway Lounge =

Demolished hotel in Jackson, Mississippi

Coordinates: 32.299745°N 90.196476°W

The Summers Hotel was located in Jackson, Mississippi, United States, and was the city's first black-owned hotel. W. J. Summers established it in 1944 and many black musicians lodged there during the era of segregation. The Subway Lounge was opened in the basement in 1966. The Subway was a regular jazz venue and offered popular late-night blues shows from the mid-1980s until the hotel's demolition in 2004.

The Subway Lounge was featured in the 2003 documentary film, Last of the Mississippi Jukes.

It has a marker as part of the Mississippi Blues Trail.
