= Light and Glass Studio =

Gallery specializing in photography and studio glass

Coordinates: 32.321310°N 90.186586°W

Light and Glass Studio is a Jackson, Mississippi gallery specializing in photography and studio glass. Light and Glass Studio was formed by husband and wife Jerri Sherer and Roy Adkins in 2006. Adkins first began studying fine arts with and emphasis in photography in 1991, and has worked in the fields of commercial photography, studio photography, wedding photography, and photojournalism. Adkins lived in Starkville, MS until 1998. The gallery is located in the Old Capitol Green area of downtown Jackson, Mississippi.

Roy Adkins serves on the board of directors of the Greater Jackson Arts Council and the Jackson Arts and Music Foundation and volunteers for Very Special Arts. He created the "Art Buds" program that offers art classes to special needs children. The gallery represents other regional artists and supports local causes, such as Hearts Against AIDS.
