= International Museum of Muslim Cultures =

Islamic museum in Jackson, Mississippi, the United States

Coordinates: 32.2975°N 90.1862°W

- Established: April 2001
- Location: 201 E Pascagoula St., Jackson, Mississippi, U.S.
- Type: Islamic history and culture museum
- Founders: Emad Al-Turk and Okolo Rashid
- Website: www.muslimmuseum.org

The International Museum of Muslim Cultures (IMMC) is "America’s First Muslim Museum". It was established in April 2001, in Jackson, Mississippi in what is now the Arts Center of Mississippi.

The museum was co-founded by Emad Al-Turk and Okolo Rashid in response to the Majesty of Spain exhibition, which arrived in Jackson, Mississippi in 2000, as a landmark cultural event that transformed the state’s arts landscape. Presented at the Mississippi Arts Pavilion, the blockbuster exhibition showcased more than 600 years of Spanish history, art, and royal heritage through rare artifacts, paintings, tapestries, manuscripts, and regal treasures from Spain’s Royal Palace and national collections. However, the exhibition failed to include any representation of the Muslim-ruled Andalusian era, which spanned 781 years of Spain’s history.

A group of local Muslims decided to create their own exhibition called Moorish Spain: Its Legacy to Europe and the West featuring the great contributions of Muslims to the world. What was intended as a temporary exhibition became a permanent museum.

== Islamic Heritage Month ==
In celebration of IMMC’s 15th anniversary, former Jackson Mayor Tony Yarber issued a proclamation designating April as Islamic Heritage Month (IHM) under the auspices of the International Museum of Muslim Cultures. He urged the community “to celebrate and commemorate the historical contributions of Muslims, who ignited the Renaissance of Europe—into America, ushering in the age of science and technology, a culture of tolerance and peace [that values] education“. Each year during the month of April, IMMC hosts numerous fun activities and educational events such as mini exhibits, gallery talks, film screenings, arts performances and workshops, cultural programs, and interfaith gatherings. IHM concludes with a community festival of cultural presentations, art demonstrations and exhibits, food tastings, fashion shows, musical performances, and more.
