= Eugene Welborne =

American politician

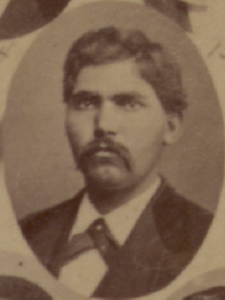
Eugene Welborne circa 1874 (listed as "Willburn, E B")

Eugene Bonaparte Welborne (died January 9, 1934) was a constable and state legislator in Mississippi. He represented Hinds County, Mississippi, from 1874 to 1875 in the Mississippi House of Representatives and lived in Clinton, Mississippi. He was a Republican.

He was born in Clinton to Johnson W. Welborn, a wealthy merchant, and Celia Saunders. His date of birth is uncertain with dates of 1849 to circa 1851 given.

Welborne was nominated to represent Hinds County at the Republican Convention August 1873 along with Shorter, George, G. Mosley and Peyton.

His name was spelled variously including "Wellbourne" and even "Willburn, E B" in a collection of photographs of the Members of the Legislature 1874-75. His brother and descendants used the spelling "Welborn" which was also used for Eugene in some of the legislature records.

He served in the state militia under Charles Caldwell, serving as First Lieutenant in Company A of the Second Regiment Infantry.

He was a Republican. He was accused of being involved in an election fracas in Clinton, Mississippi, in 1875 that led up to the Clinton Riot. His house was surrounded by armed men on the same night that Charles Caldwell was killed, but he had the assistance of twelve armed black men at his home so was able to escape. He took refuge in the Lunatic Asylum after the riot until events calmed. He fled the violence and death threats moving to Washington, D.C.

He died January 9, 1934, at his home in Montello Avenue Washington, D.C. He was survived by his wife Susie and three children: Cosmo, Audrey and Olive. He was also the father to Eugenia and Walter from his first marriage to Sarah A. Welborne. He was buried at Payne's Cemetery in Washington, and then later relocated with every other grave to National Harmony Memorial Park.

== See also ==
- African American officeholders from the end of the Civil War until before 1900
