= Standard Life Building =

Skyscraper in Mississippi, United States

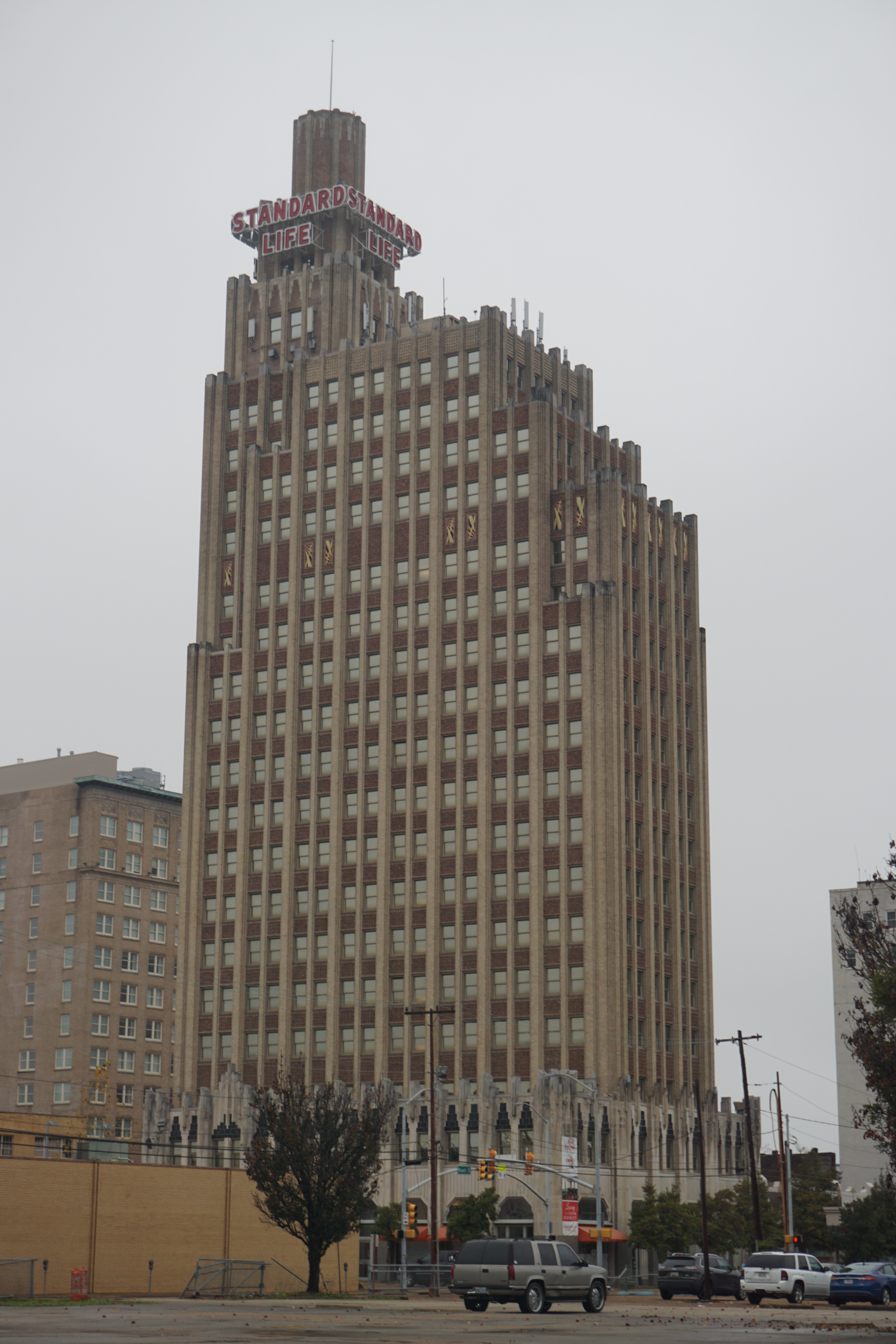
- Interactive map of the Standard Life Building area

General information
- Type: Residential
- Location: 200-208 West Pearl Street, Jackson, Mississippi
- Coordinates: 32.29985°N 90.18968°W
- Completed: 1929

Technical details
- Floor count: 22

The Standard Life Building is a historic high-rise building in Jackson, Mississippi, USA. It was designed in the Art Deco architectural style, and it was completed in 1929. It is the fourth tallest building in Jackson.
