= Edward M. Yerger =

American newspaper editor and military officer (1828–1875)

- Born: 1828; Nashville, Tennessee, U.S.
- Died: April 22, 1875 (aged 46–47) Baltimore, Maryland, U.S.
- Allegiance: Confederate States
- Conflicts: American Civil War
- Education: Oakland College

Edward M. Yerger (1828 – April 22, 1875) was an American newspaper editor and military officer. After a career in the newspaper industry, Yerger was arrested for the stabbing death of the provisional mayor of Jackson, Mississippi. His claim of habeas corpus after he was arrested by military authorities was appealed to the U. S. Supreme Court in Ex parte Yerger, a case tried before the Supreme Court of the United States.

== Early life and education ==
Yerger was born in 1828 in Nashville, Tennessee, the youngest son of Tennessee Attorney General George Shall Yerger. Edward and his family eventually relocated to Mississippi. Yerger graduated from Oakland College and served as a colonel in the Confederate States Army during the American Civil War.

== Career ==
Yerger edited several newspapers, including the Jackson Daily Mississippian, the Jackson Daily News, the Vicksburg Herald, and the Baltimore Evening Journal. On April 6, 1867, while on the staff of the Daily Mississippian, he engaged in a duel with I.M. Patridge of the Herald. Yerger had taken offense to an article that appeared in the latter paper, disparaging the Mississippian. Yerger was also involved in conflicts with Colonel Manlove of the Vicksburg Times and Major Barksdale of the Jackson Clarion. Yerger was later employed by the Vicksburg Herald. He announced his resignation from the staff of the Herald on January 28, 1868. Yerger was described by a historian as "mentally unsound".

== Murder of Joseph G. Crane ==
In 1869, Major Joseph G. Crane became acting mayor of Jackson, Mississippi by military appointment. Yerger, a resident of Jackson, had refused to pay his taxes in 1867 and 1868. In order to collect the money Yerger owed, Crane seized Yerger's piano to sell at auction. At the time. Yerger was out of town and unable to prevent the seizure. He returned home on June 8, and confronted Crane the next day. An argument ensued and Yerger stabbed Crane to death. Yerger was arrested and set to be tried by a military commission. He was represented by his uncle William Yerger, a former justice on the Mississippi Supreme Court, who sought a writ of habeas corpus from the circuit court. The resulting case, Ex parte Yerger, was heard by the Supreme Court of the United States. Chief Justice Salmon P. Chase concluded that the court had jurisdiction to hear the case, which meant Yerger did not have to be tried by the military commission. The attorney general and William Yerger agreed that Yerger be turned over to civilian authorities for prosecution.

Yerger was never tried for murder, and, after a stint in a Mississippi jail, was released on bail and moved to Baltimore, Maryland.

== Death ==
Yerger died in Baltimore, Maryland on April 22, 1875.
