= William G. Yerger =

American lawyer and politician

William G Yerger (died November 6, 1899) was a lawyer in Greenville, Mississippi who served in the Mississippi Senate. He was a Democrat.

He served first as a soldier and then as an officer in the Confederate Army. He served in Company D, 28th regiment Mississippi Cavalry and was a 2nd Lieutenant at the end of the American Civil War.

He served in the Mississippi Senate from 1886 to 1890, representing Washington County, Mississippi, the 15th district. He also was a key member of the 1890 Mississippi Constitutional Convention.

He died November 6, 1899 aged 59 after being ill for several months.
