= Ex parte Yerger =

- Supreme Court of the United States

Argued October 15, 1869 Decided October 25, 1869
- Full case name: Ex parte Edward M. Yerger
- Citations: 75 U.S. 85 (more) 8 Wall. 85; 19 L. Ed. 332; 1868 U.S. LEXIS 1085

Case history
- Prior: Original

Court membership
- Chief Justice Salmon P. Chase Associate Justices Samuel Nelson · Robert C. Grier; Nathan Clifford · Noah H. Swayne; Samuel F. Miller · David Davis; Stephen J. Field

Case opinion
- Majority: Chase, joined by unanimous

Ex parte Yerger, 75 U.S. (8 Wall.) 85 (1869), was a case heard by the Supreme Court of the United States in which the court held that, under the Judiciary Act of 1789, it is authorized to issue writs of habeas corpus.

== Background ==
In June 1869 Edward M. Yerger stabbed to death Maj. Joseph G. Crane, who was the acting mayor of Jackson, Mississippi. Military authorities arrested Yerger and placed him on trial before a military commission. During the trial Yerger sought a writ of habeas corpus from the circuit court under the Judiciary Act of 1789, but the circuit court upheld the military tribunal's jurisdiction over the proceeding under the First Reconstruction Act of 1867. When the circuit court denied him relief, he refiled the case directly to the Supreme Court.

== Opinion of the court ==
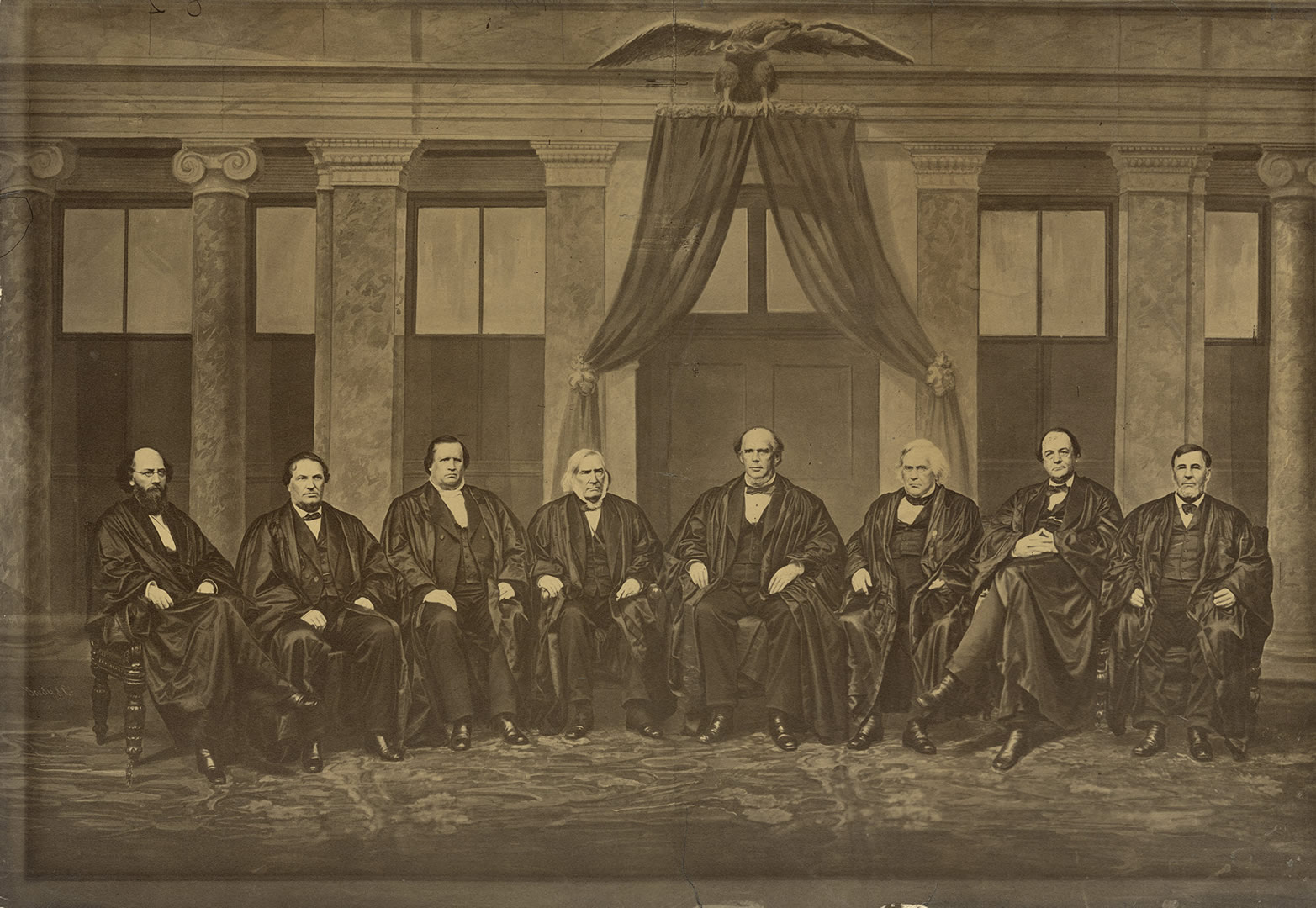
The Chase Court as of 1869.

Chief Justice Salmon P. Chase held that while the United States Congress had enacted legislation in 1868 eliminating one route to a habeas corpus hearing before the court (see Ex parte McCardle, 74 U.S. 506 (1868)), the Court could still hear cases of a similar nature in the first instance under the Judiciary Act of 1789. Chase concluded that the Court had jurisdiction to hear the case and the power to direct its writ at a military officer.

== Subsequent developments ==
At this point the attorney general and Yerger's counsel worked out a compromise in which the prisoner was turned over to civilian authorities for prosecution in Mississippi. The Court was not actually forced to confront Congress on issues involving Reconstruction, and Congress in turn abandoned plans to completely abolish the Court's appellate jurisdiction in habeas corpus cases. Yerger was placed in a Mississippi jail, but released on bail and quickly moved to Baltimore, where he died in 1875, never having been tried for murder.

== See also ==
- List of United States Supreme Court cases, volume 75
