= George Shall Yerger =

American jurist

George Shall Yerger (1808–1860) was a lawyer who was the first Tennessee Attorney General between 1831 and 1839. He later practiced law in Mississippi.

He was born in Tennessee and had eight brothers. His son, Edward M. Yerger, became a newspaper editor and was involved in a notable legal case Ex parte Yerger.

In 1839, Yerger moved to Mississippi. In 1844, Yerger served as lead defense counsel for Daniel W. Adams, for whom he won acquittal of murder charges. He often represented banking institutions during his career. Yerger died in a hunting accident.
