= Weldon Hicks =

American farmer, judge and politician

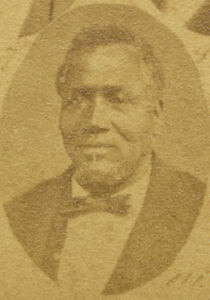

Weldon Hicks was a farmer, judge and state legislator in Mississippi. He was born in Virginia. He served as a Justice of the Peace and represented Hinds County, Mississippi in the Mississippi House of Representatives in 1874, 1875, and 1878. He was documented as having been illiterate.

He lived in Edwards, Mississippi.

== See also ==
- African American officeholders from the end of the Civil War until before 1900
