= Mississippi Miss Basketball =

Basketball award

Each year the Mississippi Miss Basketball award is given to the best high school girls basketball player in the state of Mississippi by The Clarion-Ledger.

== Award winners ==
Year	Player	High School	College	WNBA draft
2016	Myah Taylor	Olive Branch HS, Olive Branch	Mississippi State	
2015	Myah Taylor	Olive Branch HS, Olive Branch	Mississippi State	
2014	Victoria Vivians (2)	Scott Central HS, Forest	Mississippi State	
2013	Victoria Vivians	Scott Central HS, Forest	Mississippi State	
2012	Jerontay Clemons	Coldwater HS, Coldwater	Southern Miss	
2011	Krista Donald	Lake HS, Lake	Georgia	
2010	Valencia McFarland (2)	Raymond HS, Raymond	Ole Miss	
2009	Valencia McFarland	Raymond HS, Raymond	Ole Miss	
2008	April Sykes	East Oktibbeha County HS, Columbus	Rutgers	2012 WNBA draft: 3rd Round, 28th overall by the Los Angeles Sparks
2007	Bug Cooper	Gentry HS, Indianola	Delta State	
2006	Tiawana Pringle	Southeast Lauderdale HS, Meridian	Louisiana Tech	
2005	Kendra Reed	Bay HS, Bay St. Louis	Southern Miss	
2004	Dee Forrest	Louisville HS, Louisville	Ole Miss	
2003	Navonda Moore	Murrah HS, Jackson	Alabama	
2002	LaToya George	Clinton HS, Clinton	Jackson State	
2001	Monique Horner	Southeast Lauderdale HS, Meridian	Meridian CC	
2000	Ebony Felder	Murrah HS, Jackson	Georgia	
1999	LaToya Thomas (2)	Greenville HS, Greenville	Mississippi State	2003 WNBA draft: 1st Round, 1st overall by the Cleveland Rockers
1998	LaToya Thomas	Greenville HS, Greenville	Mississippi State	2003 WNBA draft: 1st Round, 1st overall by the Cleveland Rockers
1997	April Brown	Harrison Central HS, Gulfport	LSU	
1996	Tiffany Travis	Harrison Central HS, Gulfport	Florida	2000 WNBA draft: 2nd Round, 11th overall by the Charlotte Sting
1995	Tarsha Bethley	Simmons HS, Hollandale	Ole Miss	
1994	Rosalyn Spann	Noxubee County HS, Macon	Jackson State	
1993	Nedra Hosey	Bay Springs HS, Bay Springs	Southern Miss	
1992	Yolanda Moore	Port Gibson HS, Port Gibson	Ole Miss	
1991	Niesa Johnson	Clinton HS, Clinton	Alabama	
1990	Cornelia Gayden	Bogue Chitto HS, Bogue Chitto	LSU	
1989	Stacy Truitt	Port Gibson HS, Port Gibson	Kansas	
1988	Alexis Hall	Harrison Central HS, Gulfport	Southern Miss	
1987	Jackie Martin	Warren Central HS, Vicksburg	Ole Miss	
1986	Annette Jackson	Brookhaven HS, Brookhaven	LSU	
1985	Cynthia Autry	Houston HS, Houston	Ole Miss	
1984	Chana Perry	Brookhaven HS, Brookhaven	Northeast Louisiana; San Diego State	
1983	Alisa Scott	Warren Central HS, Vicksburg	Ole Miss	
1982	Jennifer Gillom	Lafayette HS, Oxford	Ole Miss	
1981	Eugenia Conner	Harrison Central HS, Gulfport	Ole Miss	
1980	Janice Lawrence (2)	George County HS, Lucedale	Louisiana Tech	
1979	Janice Lawrence	George County HS, Lucedale	Louisiana Tech	

=== Most winners by high school and college ===
Number	High School
4	Harrison Central High School, Gulfport

Number	College
10	Ole Miss
4	Mississippi State
4	Southern Miss
3	Louisiana Tech
3	LSU

== See also ==
Mississippi Mr. Basketball
