= Barbara Blanton =

American politician

Member of the Mississippi State Senate from the 30th district
- In office January 5, 1988 – January 7, 1992
- Preceded by: Mitch Childre
- Succeeded by: Dean Kirby

Personal details
- Born: September 8, 1937 (age 88) Crystal Springs, Mississippi, U.S.
- Party: Republican
- Spouse: Terrell D. Blanton
- Children: 3

Barbara Lene Blanton (nee Yarbrough, born September 8, 1937) is an American politician from Mississippi. She represented Rankin County in the Mississippi State Senate from 1988 to 1992 and was an unsuccessful candidate for Secretary of State of Mississippi in 1995.

== Early life and career ==
Barbara Lean Yarbrough was born on September 8, 1937, in Crystal Springs, Mississippi, to Clarence Yarbrough and grew up on a farm near Terry, Mississippi. She graduated from Terry High School and then attended Hinds Junior College, where she met and married her husband, Terrell D. "Ted" Blanton circa 1957. Ted served in the United States Navy from 1961 to 1974, and the couple moved around several times while raising their three children. She later attended Millsaps College, graduating in 1976. During her time there, she earned the Biology Research Award for her research on Hodgkin's lymphoma. Blanton has run a tractor dealership and a floral shop.

== Political career ==
In April 1987, Blanton announced her candidacy to represent the 30th District (composed of northern Rankin County) as a Republican in the Mississippi State Senate for the 1988-1992 term. In the general election on November 3, 1987, she defeated the Democratic three-term incumbent Mitch Childre in an upset victory by receiving 8,267 votes or 52% of the total, compared to Childre's 7,693 votes, or 48% of the total.

Blanton ran for re-election in 1991, but lost to Dean Kirby in the Republican primary: Blanton received 3,915 votes, while Kirby received 5,073 votes. The Senate districts were redrawn in 1992, prompting a new election for the remainder of the term. Blanton spent almost $21,655 on her campaign for re-election, with all but $500 being from her own money. Kirby spent $4,819 on his campaign with $3,950 coming from contributions and less than $1000 from his own money. In spite of being outspent on a 5-1 margin, Blanton still lost the primary, receiving 2,565 votes compared to 3,864 for Kirby. After the election, the Blantons later moved to northeast Jackson, Mississippi.

Blanton campaigned in the election for Mississippi Secretary of State in 1995 and defeated Chris Webster, a former legal aide to Governor Kirk Fordice, in the Republican primary, with 62,050 votes compared to Webster's 49,828 votes. However, she lost the general election to Democrat Eric Clark. Clark received 416,397 votes or 61% of the total, while Blanton received 266,834 votes or 39% of the total.

== Personal life ==
Blanton was a member of the Baptist Church. She and her husband Terrell Davis Blanton (1938-2017) had one son and two daughters, born 1958/1959, 1961, and 1963/1964. Her daughter, Donna Michelle Blanton Dickey (born December 30, 1961), died on August 23, 2006.
