= Terry High School =

Terry High School may refer to:

- Terry High School, Hinds County School District, Terry, Mississippi
- B.F. Terry High School, Lamar Consolidated Independent School District, Rosenberg, Texas
