= REBUL Academy =

Defunct segregation academy in Mississippi

Location
- 5257 Learned Rd; Learned, Hinds, Mississippi 39154; United States; 32.2024°N 90.5502°W

Information
- School type: Private
- Religious affiliation: Christian
- Founded: 1967
- NCES District ID: 2801860
- NCES School ID: 01653321
- Head of school: Debra J. Bowers
- Grades: K-12
- Enrollment: 32
- Colors: Red, Black, White
- Athletics: Archery, Basketball, Softball
- Team name: Raiders
- Accreditation: Midsouth Association of Independent Schools (MAIS); Southern Association of Colleges and Schools (SACS)
- Website: www.rebulacademy.com
- Last updated: 10 March 2024

REBUL Academy was a private K-12 school for White children in Learned, Mississippi, United States. It closed in June 2024.

== History ==
REBUL Academy was founded in 1967 as a segregation academy. In 1968, REBUL Academy was one of the founding members of the Mississippi Private School Association. The school lost its tax exempt status in 1970 as the result of a determination by the IRS that it had discriminatory admission practices. It did not get tax-exempt status until 1993.

In the fall of 1968, its first year of operation, the school had 83 students. It grew to 162 students in 1969 and 262 in 1970.

In June 2006, the gymnasium was destroyed in a fire.

REBUL Academy's name derives from the communities it serves - Raymond, Edwards, Bolton, Utica, and Learned.

In June 2024, the school closed.

== Demographics ==
According to NCES, as of the 2021-2022 school year, the school had a total of 51 students in kindergarten through 12th grade. Of these 51, 100% were White.

There were a total of 7 teachers in grades kindergarten through 12th, for a student teacher ratio of 7.3.

== Athletics ==
REBUL Academy fields teams in archery, basketball, and softball. The school participates in Class 2A, the smallest class of MAIS.

== Controversies ==
In 2020, a REBUL Academy coach, Christopher Ingram, was arrested for an off-campus incident of having sex with a 17-year-old student and for making claims about his son dying of cancer to raise money. In 2022, he was convicted and sentenced to 15 years for both crimes.
