= Chatmon =

Chatmon is a surname. Notable people with this surname include:

- Armenter Chatmon, the real name of early American blues musician Bo Carter (1893–1964)
- Pete Chatmon (born 1977), American filmmaker
- Sam Chatmon (1897–1983), American Delta blues guitarist and singer
