= Raymond High School (Mississippi) =

Coordinates: 32°15′20″N 90°25′12″W

- 14050 Highway 18, Raymond, MS 39154; United States

Information
- Principal: Charles Willis
- Staff: 39.34 (FTE)
- Grades: 9–12
- Gender: Coeducational
- Enrollment: 557 (2023-2024)
- Student to teacher ratio: 14.16
- Campus type: Rural
- Color
- Team name: Rangers
- Website: www.hinds.k12.ms.us/o/rhs

Raymond High School is a public secondary school located in the town of Raymond, Mississippi (United States). It is part of the Hinds County School District. As of 2005, the school had met all federal requirements under the No Child Left Behind Act and received an achievement index rank of "3" (successful) from the state of Mississippi. It is one of two regional high schools serving Hinds County. The principal is Charles Willis.

== Community ==
Raymond High School is one of two high schools in the Hinds County School District. The other is Terry High School, in Terry, Mississippi. Raymond High draws students from Bolton, Edwards, Learned, Raymond, and Utica.

During the 2005–06 school year, Raymond High School had 579 students. Of those students, 458 were African-American and 118 were Caucasian. Two students were of Hispanic descent, and one student was Asian. Ninth grade had 198 students, 10th grade had 152 students, 11th grade had 119 students, and 12th grade had 105 students. The school has about half the student population of Hinds County's other public high school, Terry High.

Raymond High has experienced a significant growth in its student population over the last decade.

Raymond accepted a small number of displaced students in the wake of Hurricane Katrina in 2005. Though most of those students have returned to their homes, a handful remained at the school.

== Academics ==
Based on a college preparatory program, the school provides courses in mathematics, science, English, social sciences, Spanish, computers, art, and music. It also has a popular Air Force ROTC program that attracts a number of students each year.

== Athletics and extracurriculars ==
The school offers a wide range of athletic and extra-curricular activities throughout the school year. Inter-scholastic athletics include football, slow- and fast-pitch softball, girls' and boys' basketball, cross country, baseball, track and field, and golf. Teams currently compete in division 4A of the Mississippi High School Athletic Association. The 2009-2010 Girls' Basketball team won the 4A State Championship, as well as the Grand Slam Championship, giving Raymond High School the 4A Girls' Basketball State Title. The Lady Rangers are back to back State Champions, Two Time South State winners, and Four Time District Champions. The Lady Rangers finished 33-1 during the 2009–2010 season, losing only to Greenville.

== Tradition ==
Things at Raymond High have generally remained the same over the years. The main colors of the school are blue & gold. The mascot is, and always has been, the Ranger.

== Notable alumni ==
- Stephanie Foster, member of the Mississippi House of Representatives
- Jeremy Williams, American player of Canadian football
