= George Caldwell Granberry =

American politician

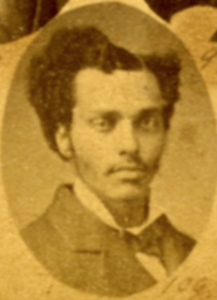

George Caldwell Granberry was a state legislator, postmaster, and teacher in Mississippi. He was a member of the Mississippi House of Representatives during the 1882 session, representing Hinds county. He was a member of the Committee on Propositions and Grievances, a standing committee. While he served in the Legislature, he was also a school teacher. In 1881, he was part of a fusion ticket along with Republican nominees for the Mississippi Legislature J. B. Greaves, Thomas Atkinson, and J. A. Shorter.

In 1901, Granberry was appointed to be the next postmaster of Raymond in Hinds county, Mississippi. He was appointed to succeed the previous postmaster, Philomene Buckley, after her resignation. For three years, Granberry held the position, becoming the second Black person in the area to hold a federal office. He resigned from the position in 1905, stepping down June 1.

Before 1905, he was a Mississippi delegate at a Republican National Convention.

== See also ==
- African American officeholders from the end of the Civil War until before 1900
