= Mississippi Sheiks =

Country blues band

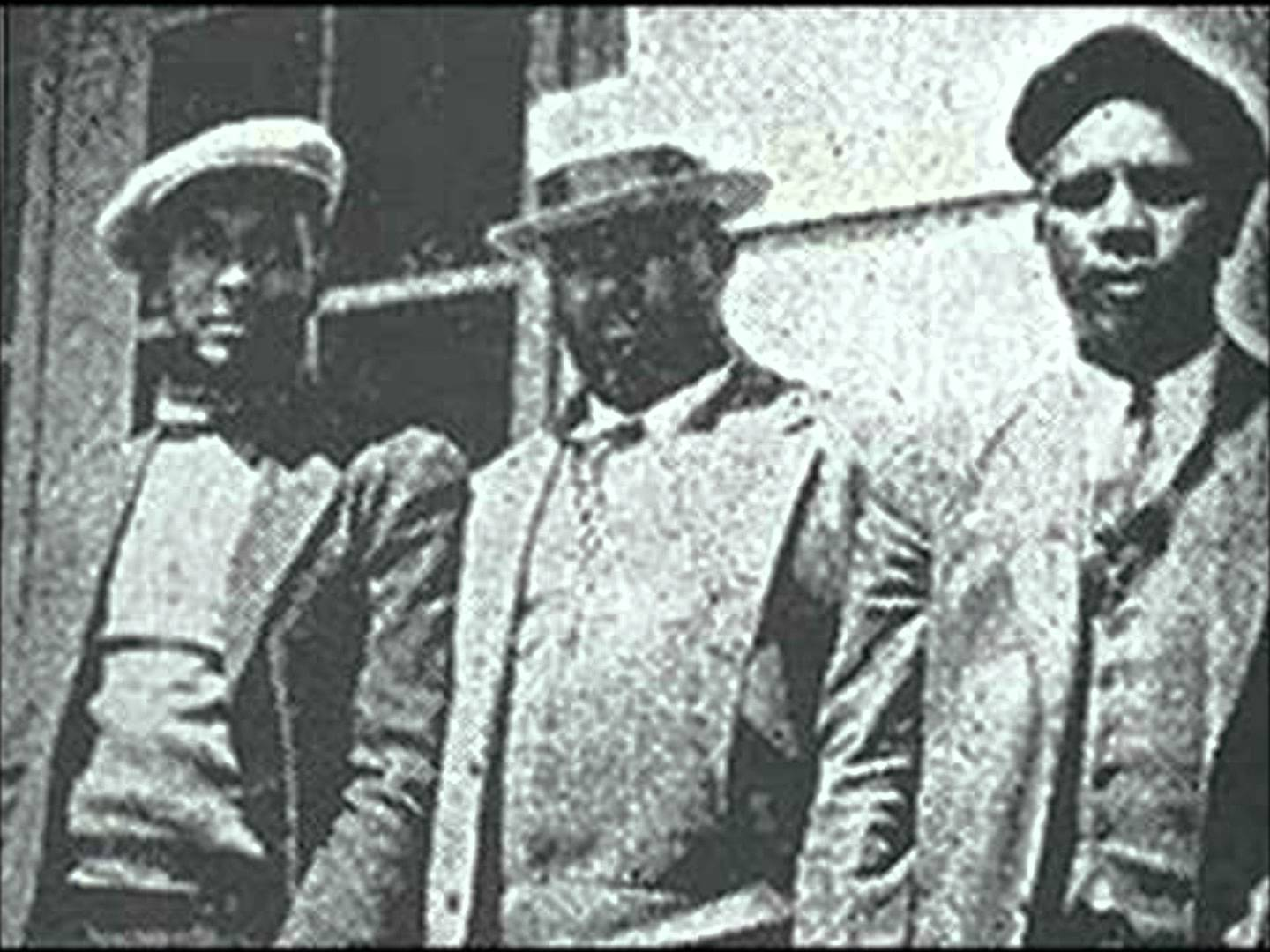

Background information
- Origin: Bolton, Mississippi, U.S.
- Genres: Delta blues; Country blues
- Years active: 1930–1935
- Labels: Okeh; Paramount; Columbia; Bluebird; Champion

The Mississippi Sheiks were a popular and influential American guitar and fiddle group of the 1930s. They were notable mostly for playing country blues but were adept at many styles of popular music of the time. They recorded around 70 tracks, primarily in the first half of the 1930s. In 2004, they were inducted into the Mississippi Musicians Hall of Fame.

Their 1930 blues single "Sitting on Top of the World" was inducted into the Grammy Hall of Fame in 2008. In 2018, it was selected for preservation in the National Recording Registry by the Library of Congress as being "culturally, historically, or aesthetically significant".

== Formation ==
The Mississippi Sheiks consisted mainly of members of the Chatmon family, from Bolton, Mississippi, who were well known in the Mississippi Delta. The father of the family, Henderson Chatmon, had been a "musicianer" (someone with good technical ability on his or her instrument, adept at sight-reading written music) during slavery times, and his children carried on the musical spirit. Their most famous member (although not a permanent member) was Armenter Chatmon, better known as Bo Carter, who managed a successful solo career as well as playing with the Sheiks, which may have contributed to their success.

When the band first recorded, in 1930, the line-up consisted of Carter, Lonnie and Sam Chatmon, and Walter Vinson. Papa Charlie McCoy (not to be confused with Charlie McCoy, a later American musician) played later, when Carter and Sam Chatmon ceased playing full-time. Lonnie Chatmon and Vinson formed the core of the group.

== Music ==
Carter's solo work is notable for his sexually suggestive songs, and this tone carried over to some extent to the group. They primarily earned their income as Robert Johnson and Skip James did: they toured throughout the South but also traveled to Chicago and New York.

Their first and biggest success was "Sitting on Top of the World" (1930), later recorded by Doc Watson, Bob Wills (numerous times), Howlin' Wolf, Nat King Cole, Bill Monroe, Harry Belafonte, Frank Sinatra, Bob Dylan, Cream, Grateful Dead, Jeff Healey, John Lee Hooker, Bill Frisell, The Seldom Scene, Jack White, and Australian combo, The Bona Fide Travellers. It was also the theme music of the film A Face in the Crowd (1957), produced by Elia Kazan and starring Andy Griffith. During their five active years, the Mississippi Sheiks recorded over seventy songs for Okeh Records, Paramount Records and Bluebird Records.

Their last recording session as the Mississippi Sheiks was in 1935. Carter made a few more sessions on his own, but by 1938 he too was dropped. When the band dissolved, the Chatmon brothers gave up music and returned to farming.

The Sheiks and related groups, such as the Mississippi Mud Steppers and the Blacksnakes, recorded about a hundred sides in the first half of the 1930s, among them original compositions (probably by Vinson), such as "The World Is Going Wrong" and "I've Got Blood in My Eyes for You" (1931) (both recorded by Bob Dylan), and the topical "Sales Tax" (1934).

Sam Chatmon made more recordings in the 1960s, and Walter Vinson contributed three selections (under the name of the Mississippi Sheiks) to Riverside's 1961 series Chicago: The Living Legends.

== Ongoing influence ==
Rory Gallagher recorded a tribute song, "The Mississippi Sheiks", for his album Photo-Finish, in 1978.

Black Hen Music released Things About Comin' My Way, a tribute album to the Mississippi Sheiks, in 2009. The album contains contributions from seventeen artists, including Bruce Cockburn, Bill Frisell, the Carolina Chocolate Drops, Geoff Muldaur, Kelly Joe Phelps and John Hammond.

In 2013, Jack White's Third Man Records teamed up with Document Records to issue The Complete Recorded Works in Chronological Order of Charley Patton, Blind Willie McTell and the Mississippi Sheiks.
