= Susan Dabney Smedes =

American teacher, newspaper correspondent and author

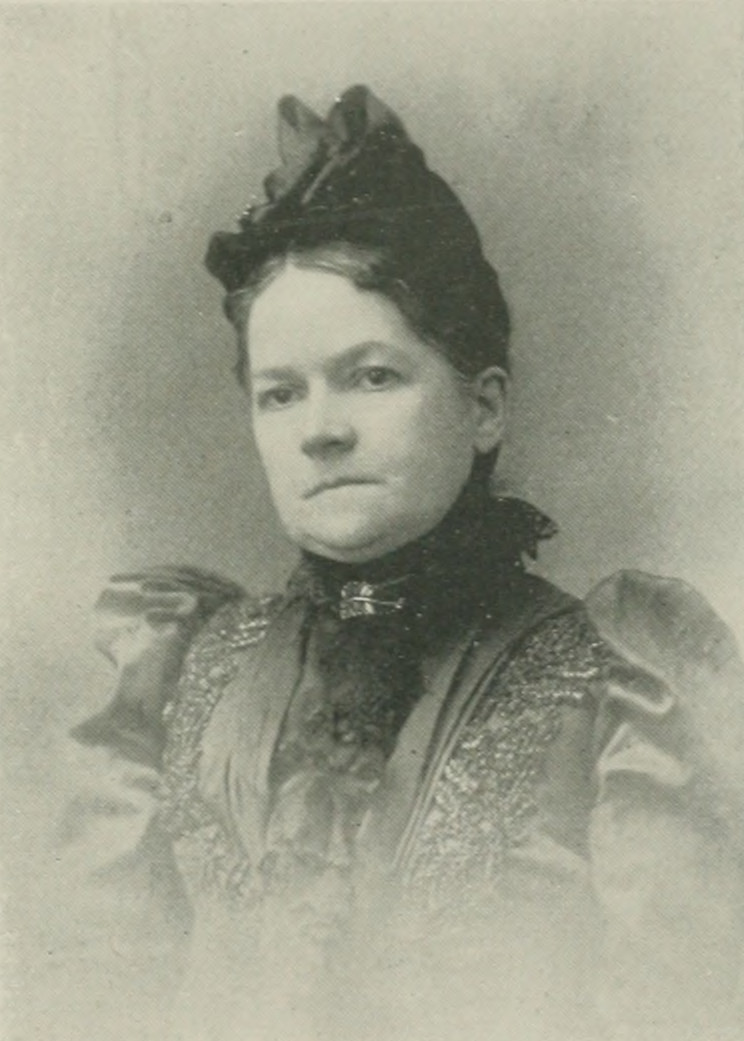
Susan Dabney Smedes

Susan C. née Dabney Smedes (August 20, 1840 – July 4, 1913) was an American teacher, newspaper correspondent, and author who wrote about her father's plantation.

She was born in Raymond, Mississippi, the eighth child of Thomas S. Dabney, a wealthy plantation owner, and Sophia Hill Dabney. She married Lyell Smedes who died a few months later, 16 Jan 1861. She and her sisters were benefactors of the Bishop Green training-school at Dry Grove, Mississippi where she taught. She moved with her family to Baltimore after their plantation, Burleigh, was lost to creditors. Her father died in 1885. She wrote Memorials of a Southern Planter about his life. It was published by Baltimore: Cushings & Bailey in 1887. In 1887, she became a teacher at the U.S. government's Big Oak School of the Rosebud Agency in Dakota Territory.
