= Simmons High School =

Simmons High School may refer to:

- Simmons High School (Mississippi), Hollandale School District
- Philip Simmons High School, Charleston, South Carolina
