= Learned, Mississippi =

- Town
- Location of Learned, Mississippi

- Location in the United States
- Coordinates: 32°11′50″N 90°32′55″W
- Country: United States
- State: Mississippi
- County: Hinds

Area
  - Total: 0.34 sq mi (0.88 km^{2})
  - Land: 0.34 sq mi (0.87 km^{2})
  - Water: 0.0039 sq mi (0.01 km^{2})
- Elevation: 213 ft (65 m)

Population (2020)
  - Total: 56
  - Density: 166.9/sq mi (64.43/km^{2})
- Time zone: UTC-6 (Central (CST))
  - Summer (DST): UTC-5 (CDT)
- ZIP code: 39154
- Area code: 601
- FIPS code: 28-39880
- GNIS feature ID: 2405996

Learned is a town in Hinds County, Mississippi, United States. As of the 2020 census, Learned had a population of 56.

== Population ==
The population was 94 at the 2010 census, up from 50 at the 2000 census. It is part of the Jackson Metropolitan Statistical Area.

== Name ==
The community has the name of one Mr. Learned, an early settler.

== Geography ==
Learned is located southwest of the center of Hinds County 25 miles (40 km) southwest of Jackson, the state capital, and 27 miles (43 km) southeast of Vicksburg.

According to the United States Census Bureau, the town has a total area of 0.34 square miles (0.87 km^{2}).

== Demographics ==
Historical population
| Census | Pop. | Note | %± |
|---|---|---|---|
| 1890 | 119 | | — |
| 1900 | 138 | | 16.0% |
| 1910 | 134 | | −2.9% |
| 1920 | 136 | | 1.5% |
| 1930 | 134 | | −1.5% |
| 1940 | 130 | | −3.0% |
| 1950 | 126 | | −3.1% |
| 1960 | 96 | | −23.8% |
| 1970 | 116 | | 20.8% |
| 1980 | 113 | | −2.6% |
| 1990 | 111 | | −1.8% |
| 2000 | 50 | | −55.0% |
| 2010 | 94 | | 88.0% |
| 2020 | 56 | | −40.4% |
U.S. Decennial Census

=== 2020 census ===
Learned town, Mississippi – Racial and ethnic composition Note: the US Census treats Hispanic/Latino as an ethnic category. This table excludes Latinos from the racial categories and assigns them to a separate category. Hispanics/Latinos may be of any race.
| Race / Ethnicity (NH = Non-Hispanic) | Pop 2000 | Pop 2010 | Pop 2020 | % 2000 | % 2010 | % 2020 |
|---|---|---|---|---|---|---|
| White alone (NH) | 41 | 86 | 48 | 82.00% | 91.49% | 85.71% |
| Black or African American alone (NH) | 9 | 5 | 4 | 18.00% | 5.32% | 7.14% |
| Native American or Alaska Native alone (NH) | 0 | 0 | 1 | 0.00% | 0.00% | 1.79% |
| Asian alone (NH) | 0 | 1 | 1 | 0.00% | 1.06% | 1.79% |
| Native Hawaiian or Pacific Islander alone (NH) | 0 | 0 | 0 | 0.00% | 0.00% | 0.00% |
| Other race alone (NH) | 0 | 0 | 0 | 0.00% | 0.00% | 0.00% |
| Mixed race or Multiracial (NH) | 0 | 2 | 2 | 0.00% | 2.13% | 3.57% |
| Hispanic or Latino (any race) | 0 | 0 | 0 | 0.00% | 0.00% | 0.00% |
| Total | 50 | 94 | 56 | 100.00% | 100.00% | 100.00% |

=== 2000 census ===
As of the census of 2000, there were 50 people, 22 households, and 17 families residing in the town. The population density was 167.4 inhabitants per square mile (64.6/km^{2}). There were 24 housing units at an average density of 80.3 per square mile (31.0/km^{2}). The racial makeup of the town was 82.00% White and 18.00% African American.

There were 22 households, out of which 22.7% had children under the age of 18 living with them, 54.5% were married couples living together, 18.2% had a female householder with no husband present, and 22.7% were non-families. 22.7% of all households were made up of individuals, and 18.2% had someone living alone who was 65 years of age or older. The average household size was 2.27 and the average family size was 2.65.

In the town, the population was spread out, with 16.0% under the age of 18, 4.0% from 18 to 24, 24.0% from 25 to 44, 34.0% from 45 to 64, and 22.0% who were 65 years of age or older. The median age was 48 years. For every 100 females there were 108.3 males. For every 100 females age 18 and over, there were 100.0 males.

The median income for a household in the town was $40,625, and the median income for a family was $46,250. Males had a median income of $33,750 versus $31,250 for females. The per capita income for the town was $18,511. There were 27.8% of families and 23.2% of the population living below the poverty line, including no under eighteens and 52.9% of those over 64.

== Education ==
The town is served by the Hinds County School District. Much of the town is zoned to Utica Elementary-Middle School in Utica, while a piece is zoned to Raymond Elementary School and Carver Middle School in Raymond. All of it is zoned to Raymond High School in Raymond.

Learned was also the home of REBUL Academy, a small private school serving Raymond, Edwards, Bolton, Utica, and Learned, Mississippi.

== Notable people ==
- Dudy Noble, football, basketball, baseball player, and track athlete.
- George Coleman Osborn (1904–1982), historian, professor, and author.
- Sebetha Lee Jenkins (born 1939), college president and administrator.
