= Joseph Moss =

Joseph Moss may refer to:

- Joseph G. Moss, judge and state legislator in Mississippi
- Joseph Rodney Moss (1903–1993), American judge in South Carolina
- Joseph William Moss (1803–1862), English physician
- Joe Moss (born 1930), American gridiron football player and coach
- Joey Moss (born 1963), locker room attendant for the Edmonton Oilers and the Edmonton Eskimos
