= Byram, Mississippi =

- City
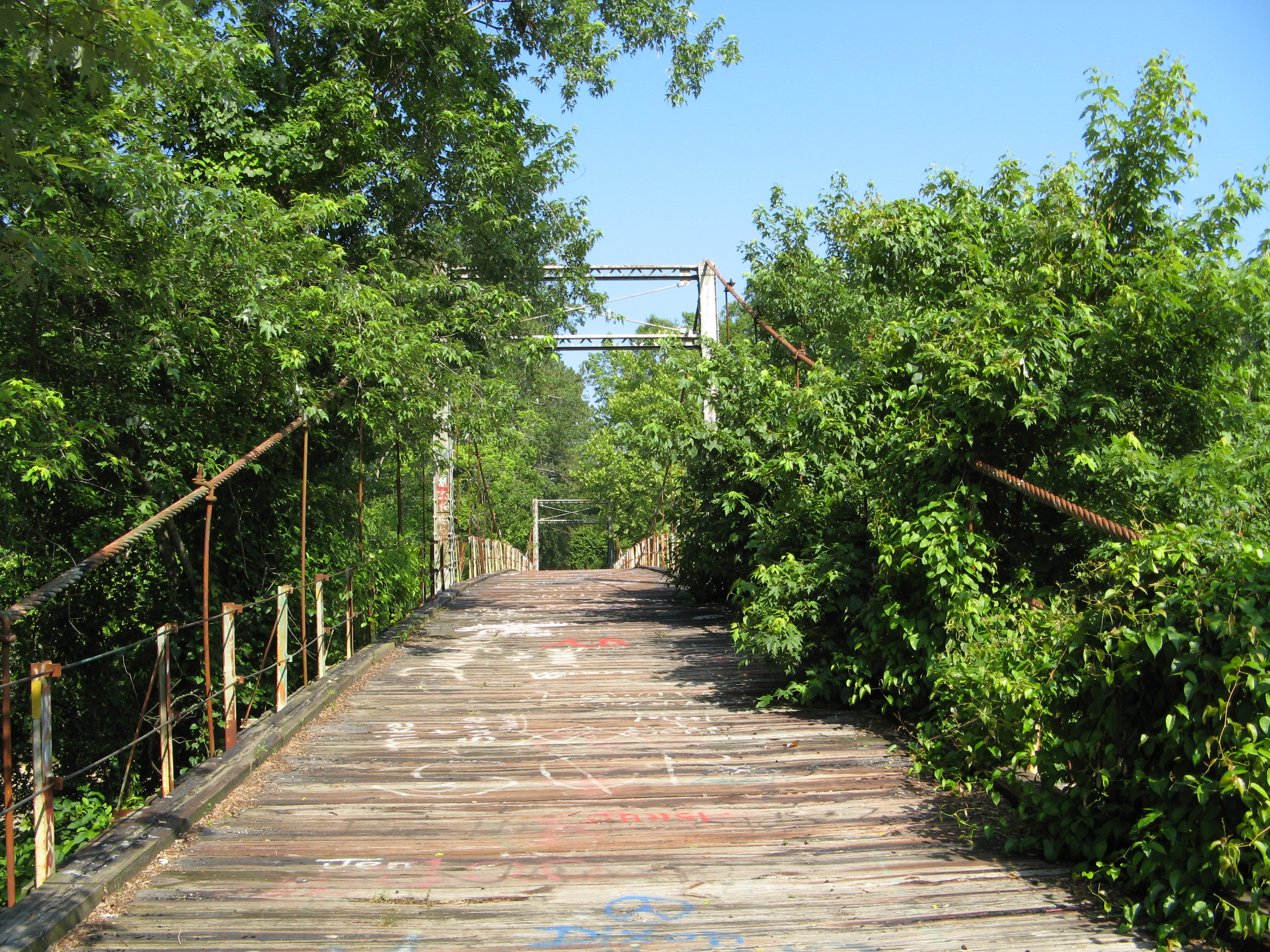
- Bridge in Byram

- Flag Seal

- Location of Byram, Mississippi

- Location of Mississippi in the United States
- Coordinates: 32°11′26″N 90°16′12″W
- Country: United States
- State: Mississippi
- County: Hinds
- First incorporation: 1870
- Second incorporation: June 16, 2009
- Disincorporation: 1931

Government
  - Type: Mayor-Council
  - Mayor: Richard White (I)

Area
  - Total: 18.63 sq mi (48.25 km^{2})
  - Land: 18.36 sq mi (47.56 km^{2})
  - Water: 0.27 sq mi (0.69 km^{2})
- Elevation: 279 ft (85 m)

Population (2020)
  - Total: 12,666
  - Density: 689.7/sq mi (266.31/km^{2})
- Time zone: UTC-6 (Central (CST))
  - Summer (DST): UTC-5 (CDT)
- ZIP code: 39272
- Area codes: 601 & 769
- FIPS code: 28-10140
- GNIS feature ID: 2560562
- Website: byram-ms.us

Byram (US: /ˈbaɪrəm/) is a city in Hinds County, Mississippi, United States. The population was 11,489 as of the 2010 census, up from 7,386 at the 2000 census, at which time it was an unincorporated census-designated place (CDP); in 2020, its population was 12,666. It is part of the Jackson metropolitan statistical area. It was incorporated for a second time in its history on June 16, 2009.

== Geography ==
Byram is bordered to the north by the city of Jackson, the state capital, and to the south by Terry.

Interstate 55 passes through the east side of Byram, with access from Exits 81 and 85. I-55 leads north 10 miles (16 km) to the center of Jackson and south 177 miles (285 km) to New Orleans.

According to the United States Census Bureau, the city of Byram has a total area of 18.6 square miles (48.3 km^{2}), of which 18.4 square miles (47.6 km^{2}) are land and 0.3 square miles (0.7 km^{2}), or 1.43%, are water. The Pearl River flows southward just east of the city limits.

== Demographics ==
Historical population
Census	Pop.	Note	%±
2000	7,386		—
2010	11,489		55.6%
2020	12,666		10.2%
U.S. Decennial Census

Byram was listed as a census designated place in the 2000 U.S. census; and then listed as a city after incorporation in 2009.

=== 2020 census ===
As of the 2020 census, Byram had a population of 12,666. The median age was 37.2 years. 24.7% of residents were under the age of 18 and 12.8% of residents were 65 years of age or older. For every 100 females there were 81.1 males, and for every 100 females age 18 and over there were 75.1 males age 18 and over.

89.7% of residents lived in urban areas, while 10.3% lived in rural areas.

There were 4,979 households in Byram, of which 36.9% had children under the age of 18 living in them. Of all households, 38.2% were married-couple households, 17.3% were households with a male householder and no spouse or partner present, and 38.8% were households with a female householder and no spouse or partner present. About 28.4% of all households were made up of individuals and 7.7% had someone living alone who was 65 years of age or older. There were 3,107 families residing in the city.

There were 5,362 housing units, of which 7.1% were vacant. The homeowner vacancy rate was 1.5% and the rental vacancy rate was 10.8%.

Byram racial composition as of 2020
	Num.	Perc.
White	3,188	25.17%
Black or African American	8,999	71.05%
Native American	10	0.08%
Asian	91	0.72%
Pacific Islander	7	0.02%
Other/Mixed	260	2.05%
Hispanic or Latino	118	0.93%

== Government ==
Byram is led by Richard White (Mayor) and the Board of Aldermen. In June 2010, Byram selected Gulfport Police Sgt. Luke Thompson, who grew up in Byram, as the city's first police chief. Thompson was given an operating budget of $1.8 million and charged with hiring 25 sworn police officers and 10 to 15 civilian employees, finding and furnishing a police headquarters, and purchasing vehicles and equipment. In June 2011, Byram selected Mississippi State Fire Academy Senior Instructor Marshall C. Robinson Jr. as the city's first fire chief. Robinson was given a direction that included the transition from a 100% volunteer fire department to a combination fire department. The City of Byram Fire Department has four sworn combat/administrators, 15 sworn combat/firefighters, 25 sworn reserve combat/firefighters, and one non-sworn officer. The city of Byram dedicated its first fire station on June 14, 2014.

=== Re-incorporation ===
The bordering city of Jackson began attempting to annex Byram in 1991. That led to unhappiness on the part of residents who feared higher property taxes and poor city services such as slow police response and a lack of street repairs. Lawsuits between Jackson and local residents began in 2004. After his election as mayor of Jackson, Frank Melton stated that he did not want to continue attempts at annexation, but the suit continued.

In 2006, a judge ruled that Byram could incorporate itself with about 20 square miles (52 km^{2}), and that Jackson could annex 4 square miles (10 km^{2}). The ruling was appealed to the Mississippi Supreme Court. On April 2, 2009, the Mississippi Supreme Court unanimously upheld the lower court's ruling. Jackson officials said they would ask for a rehearing. On April 17, 2009, the Mississippi Supreme Court granted an extension to attorneys for the city of Jackson to file a motion to reconsider the court's decision. Ultimately, Byram incorporated on June 16, 2009.

== Education ==
Byram is served by the Hinds County School District. Residents of Byram are zoned to Gary Road Elementary School, Gary Road Intermediate School, Byram Middle School, and Terry High School in Terry.

Jackson/Hinds Library System operates the Beverly J. Brown Library behind the Byram city hall.

== Notable people ==
- Ishmon Bracey, Delta blues guitarist
- Chad Bradford, former Major League Baseball relief pitcher
- Marcus Spriggs, former National Football League offensive guard

== See also ==
- Byram Bridge - a historic bridge located southeast of Byram.
