= Luster Willis =

American painter

- Born: Luster Willis; 1913; Terry, Mississippi
- Died: 1991 (aged 77–78); Terry, Mississippi
- Known for: Painting
- Movement: Modern Art

Luster Willis (1913–1991) was an African-American artist from Terry, Mississippi, best known for his painting and illustrations. He employed diverse painting styles and collage to draw attention to the shortcomings of mass media.

== Life ==
Luster Willis was born on December 25, 1913. He attended school until the eighth grade and began full-time agricultural labor thereafter. In the spring and summer he assisted his father in maintenance of their 60-acre farm. In the winter he felled trees and made cross ties for the Illinois Central Railroad. He married Louvennia Bozman on November 10, 1934, and though they had no children of their own, they raised two younger cousins together.

In 1943, he was recruited to join the American war effort during World War II. He was stationed in Europe for three years, and it was in Germany, France, and Austria where he first encountered fine art. He was discharged from the military in 1947. He returned to Egypt Hill, Mississippi, and attended the Magnolia Trade School in Jackson, Mississippi, for his barber's certification.

Willis's father died in 1963, and Willis inherited his farm, where he lived the remainder of his life. After a sudden stroke in 1986, Willis was unable to create more artwork. He died just a few years after, in 1991.

== Career ==
Willis showed an interest in and talent for art at a very young age. However, his teachers discouraged his artistic interests, disregarding them as impractical and frivolous. Nonetheless, Willis continued to draw and practice his creativity. During the Great Depression, he carved walking sticks for his neighbors in Mississippi, vowing to "put a cane in the hand of every elderly person in his small town." His canes, featuring solo human figures at the head of the cane, were so successful that they were his main source of income during the Depression, charging between 75 cents and five dollars each. When Willis inherited his father's farm in 1963, he had more space and freedom to create in his own way, and thus began to seriously paint and draw for the first time. Shortly thereafter, his work was discovered by William Ferris, the director of the Center for the Study of Southern Culture at the University of Mississippi.

=== Subject and materials ===
Willis's paintings are made from a variety of paper and materials. He tries to achieve subtle, three-dimensional shifts by painting on different kinds of paper with various thicknesses and collaging them together on the same canvas. Willis refers to this product as a "set-in," because the different materials are set together like puzzle pieces. Willis used primarily watercolors and acrylic paints on paper, pasteboard, cardboard, and plywood. Occasionally, to achieve more depth, he would add shoe polish or gold or silver glitter to the edges of the "set-in" pieces.

As for the canes that Willis carved, his early ones were carved out of hickory wood, but he later switched to cedar for its suppleness and elasticity.

Throughout his career, Willis has made approximately 300 drawings and paintings and at least that many canes. His works on paper range from 9" x 12" to 30 inches square.

=== Inspiration and process ===
Willis noted doing his best work during lonely periods, at night in the winter and early spring, in which his imaginary and material worlds could combine. He typically painted in front of his fireplace late at night, treating it as his studio space. He covered the surrounding walls with photographs of his family, friends, and community members—looking to them for inspiration while painting. These photographs helped him focus on certain aspects of his paintings that he wanted to emphasize, such as eyes. "I work on the eyes a lot, too, touching them up to try to make them look more human like. Maybe sometimes I overdo it."

Willis's process was just as often motivated by a specific image he could picture in his mind as it was by a stream of consciousness creativity driven by no preconceived idea. The concept of death fascinated Willis and led to many paintings featuring characters in caskets. His first painting about death was a reflection on the murder of Emmett Till. As a black man living in Mississippi throughout the 20th century, Willis saw death and violence affect his community in visceral ways. He noted, "I think death is interesting because it's something that, sooner or later, we all will have to meet."

Willis paints his lived experiences and real or imagined community with vivid realism, saying, "I draw from life to emphasize it, to speak through a picture what can't be brought into words." This condensed imagery communicates ubiquitous narratives found in his community and the communities of other African American artists living in the rural American South.

== Exhibitions and permanent collections ==
Willis's work has been featured in the following exhibitions:

- The Afro-American Tradition in Decorative Arts, 1978, Cleveland Museum of Art, Cleveland, OH.
- Made by Hand: Mississippi Folk Art, 22 Jan- 25 May 1980, Mississippi State Historical Museum, Jackson, MS.
- Black Folk Art in America, 1930-1980, 15 Jan- 28 Mar 1982, Corcoran Gallery of Art, Washington D.C.
- What It Is: African-American Folk Art from the Regenia A. Perry Collection, 6-27 Oct 1982, Anderson Gallery, Virginia Commonwealth University, Richmond, VA
- Baking in the Sun: Visionary Images from the South: selections from the collection of Sylvia and Warren Lowe, 13 Jun- 31 Jul 1987, University Art Museum, University of Southern Louisiana, Lafayette, LA.
- Enisled Visions: The Southern Non-Traditional Folk Artist, 1987, Fine Arts Museum of the South, Mobile, AL.
- 20th Century American Folk Art from the Arient Family Collection, 16 Oct- 14 Nov, 1987, Northern Illinois University Gallery, Chicago, IL.
- Gifted Visions: African American Folk Art, 27 1988, Atrium Gallery, University of Connecticut, Storrs, CT.
- Outsiders Looking In: Memories, Visions, and Fantasies, 1989, Gilley's Gallery, Baton Rouge, LA.
- Gifted Visions: African American Folk Art, 27 Jan- 24 Feb, 1990, University Art Gallery, University of Massachusetts, Dartmouth, MA.
- What It Is: African-American Folk Art from the Regenia A. Perry Collection, 1996, Dallas Museum of Art, Dallas, TX.
- Fundamental Soul: The Hager Gift of Self-Taught American Art, 26 Jan- 10 Mar 1996, Rockford Art Museum, Rockford, IL.
- Souls Grown Deep: African-American Vernacular Art of the South. 29 Jun- 3 Nov 1996, Michael C. Carlos Museum at City Hall East, Atlanta, GA.
- Outsider Art: An Exploration of Chicago Collections. 9 Dec 1996- 23 Feb 1997, Chicago Cultural Center, Chicago, IL.
- Noah's Ark: Animals by Southern Self-Taught Artists. 1 Aug - 19 Sep 1998, Art Museum of the University of Memphis, Memphis, TN.
- Southern Spirit: The Hill Collection, 21 Feb- 31 Mar, 2000, Museum of Art, Tallahassee, FL.
- A Return to January '82: The Corcoran Show Revisited, 22 Jan- 16 Mar 2002, Luise Ross Gallery, New York, NY.
- Stories of Community: Self-Taught Art from the Hill Collection, 12 Aug- 30 Oct 2004, Museum of Arts and Sciences, Macon, GA.
- Our Faith Affirmed- Works from the collection of Gordon W. Bailey, 10 Sep 2014- 8 Aug 2015, University of Mississippi Museum of Art, Oxford, MS.

Willis's work is in the following museums' permanent collections:

- Ackland Art Museum
- The Morgan Library & Museum
- High Museum of Art
- Los Angeles County Museum of Art
- Smithsonian American Art Museum
- Mississippi Museum of Art
- Old Capitol Museum of Mississippi History
- Kentucky Folk Art Center
- St. James Place Folk Art Museum
- New Orleans Museum of Art
- Rockford Art Museum
