= Eliza Pillars =

American nurse

Eliza Farish Pillars (April 26, 1892 – June 15, 1970) was the first black public health nurse in Mississippi. The Eliza Pillars Registered Nurses of Mississippi, a professional organization of African American nurses in Mississippi, is named in her honor.

== Early life and education ==
Eliza Farish Pillars was born on 26 April 1892 in Jackson, Mississippi. She attended public school in Jackson. Following high school, she attended Utica Normal & Industrial Institute, and then completed her nurse's training at Meharry Medical College in Nashville, Tennessee.

== Nursing career ==
After graduating from nursing school, Pillars worked for private physicians and then owned and ran a small hospital.

On February 1, 1926, Pillars became the first person of color to be a nurse for the Mississippi State Board of Health, and the first black public health nurse in Mississippi. She had a statewide role in providing public health education and training midwives. She retired in 1950.

In 1951, Pillars received the Mary Mahoney award from the American Nurses Association (ANA), which is given for significant contributions...to integration within the nursing profession."

== Death and recognitions ==
Pillars died on June 15, 1970 at the age of 78.

In 1986, Pillars was inducted into the Mississippi Nurses Association Hall of Fame.
