= Joseph G. Moss =

Former judge and state legislator

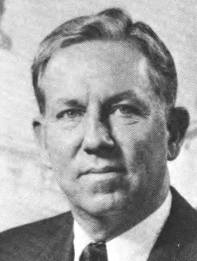
Moss c. 1973

Joseph Gibson Moss (April 26, 1922 – March 22, 2009) was an American lawyer and politician who served as a state legislator and chancery judge in Mississippi. He served in the Mississippi House of Representatives for Hinds County for 20 years. He served on the Mississippi Sovereignty Commission for 8 years.

== Early life ==
Joseph (Joe) Gibson Moss was born on April 26, 1922, in Jackson, Mississippi. He attended public schools in the city before transferring out of Central High School his senior year to attend Hinds County Agricultural High School in Raymond, MS. Upon high school graduation he was awarded scholarship to and enrolled at Hinds Junior College where he played on the football team. While there, he met Permelia Williams, and the two married on June 6, 1944. Moss had previously enlisted in the U.S. Army and served in France, Belgium, Germany, and Austria during World War II, rising to the rank of first sergeant in the 281st Combat Engineers Battalion, Third Army. He received three battle stars during the conflict, including one for the Battle of Ardennes Offensive (Battle of the Bulge). At the end of the war he returned to Hinds and received his associate's degree before attending Mississippi State University, where he earned a bachelor's degree in agricultural economics (1948)

Following graduation from Mississippi State, Moss taught agriculture classes at a high school in Clinton, MS and during that time he earned a law degree at night from Jackson School of Law. He practiced law in Raymond from 1956 to 1979.

== Political career ==
In 1956. Moss was elected to the Mississippi House of Representatives at-large seat for Hinds County. He served out five terms, leaving the body in 1975, after losing reelection in a Democratic primary matchup with another incumbent due to district reapportionment in Hinds County. He served on the Mississippi Sovereignty Commission from 1960 to 1968. He also served on the Education Committee, Ways & Means Committee, Public Utilities Committee, State Building Commission and PEER Committees during his time in the Mississippi House of Representatives.

In 1978 Moss was elected chancery judge for the Fifth Chancery Court District. He served three terms in that post and upon retirement from the bench, he took senior status whereupon he was assigned special cases until 1992.

He was a Democrat.

== Later life ==
In 1999, the Hinds Community College baseball field in Raymond was named in Moss' honor. In 1985, he was awarded Mississippi College School of Law (formerly Jackson School of Law Alumnus of the Year and in 2004 Hinds Community College (formerly Hinds Junior College) award him the same honor. He died in Raymond, MS on March 22, 2009.

== Works cited ==
- 1960 Legislative Handbook. Jackson: Mississippi Legislature. 1960. OCLC 10993584.
