= James A. Shorter =

Mississippi legislator

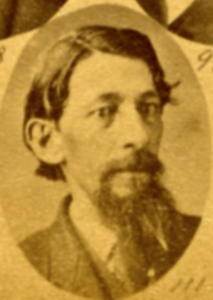

James A. Shorter, Jr. was a farmer, teacher, and state legislator in Mississippi. He served in the Mississippi House of Representatives from 1874 to 1875 and in 1882. He was a Republican. In 1879 he was reportedly attacked by white Greenback Party member William Miller. His father was an A.M.E. bishop. The son graduated from Tougaloo. He served on the Hinds County Board of Registrars. He was a chosen as a delegate to the 1875 Mississippi Republican Party Convention as one of three delegates for Dry Grove, Mississippi.

== See also ==
- African American officeholders from the end of the Civil War until before 1900
