= Andrew DeGraffenreidt =

American politician (1928–2009)

- Born: March 3, 1928; Kansas City, Missouri, U.S.
- Died: February 25, 2009 (aged 80); West Palm Beach, Florida, U.S.
- Other name: Andy
- Education: BS, Biology, Tougaloo Coll.; BS, Chemistry, Tougaloo Coll.; MS, Zoology, Penn State
- Occupations: Teacher, Politician
- Political party: Democratic

Andrew Degraffenreidt (3 March 1928 – 25 February 2009) was an educator and politician. He was notable as the first African-American commissioner in Fort Lauderdale, Florida.

== Education ==
DeGraffenreidt was born in Kansas City, Missouri and reared in Hollandale, Mississippi. He died in South Florida on Feb. 25, 2009. He received a Bachelor of Science degree in Biology and Chemistry from Tougaloo College, near Jackson, Mississippi, and a Master of Science degree in Zoology from Pennsylvania State University in State College, Pennsylvania.

== Teaching career ==
DeGraffenreidt began his teaching career as a biology teacher at Dillard High School in Fort Lauderdale, and later moved to Everglades Middle School, where he was both a teacher and the chairman of the school's science department. Additionally, he was the teacher for several programs for the Broward County School's ITV Center, including a program that focused on the contributions of minorities to the development of the United States.

== City Commissioner ==
In 1973, Andrew DeGraffenreidt was elected as the first African American city commissioner of Fort Lauderdale, Florida. He was part of the commission which elevated Virginia S. Young to the position of mayor, the first woman to hold the post in the city, and the first female mayor of a large city in Florida. During his three terms in office, he worked to establish a Youth Advisory Board and improve city infrastructure. He also pushed for the hiring of more minorities in the city's police department. He played a key role in the opening of the Von D. Mizell Community Center in Fort Lauderdale's historically black Dorsey-Riverbend neighborhood. He was also the first African-American superintendent of Parks for the city. DeGraffenreidt also was an unsuccessful candidate for Congress in the crowded 1976 Democratic primary. He left the commission in 1979.

== Post commission ==
The city of Fort Lauderdale named the DeGraffenreidt Activity Center in Bass Park in his honor.

After leaving office, DeGraffenreidt continued to serve on the city's Parks, Recreation, and Beaches Advisory Board. He was active with the United Way, Northwest Boys Club Advisory Board, Broward County Charter Commission Municipal Government Task Force, and served as an adviser to the Miami Herald's "Newspapers in Education" program. He was the city of Fort Lauderdale's "Honored Founder" for the year of 2002.

His son, Andrew DeGraffenreidt III, is an attorney who previously served as the city attorney for Hollywood, Florida and later Riviera Beach, Florida.

His oldest daughter, Fredi Grace Mitchell, is a school guidance counselor in Atlanta, Georgia.

His youngest daughter, Carol DeGraffenreidt, a former Assistant United States Attorney, is currently an Assistant Attorney General in West Palm Beach, Florida.

== Sources ==
- NIE profile
- Focus on Fort Lauderdale April.May 2002 (.pdf file)
- Summer 2006 Fort Lauderdale Parks Guide (.pdf file)
