= Rory Johnson =

American gridiron football player (born 1986)

No. 3 – Berlin Rebels
- Position: Linebacker Defensive Line

Personal information
- Born: March 15, 1986 (age 40); Vicksburg, Mississippi, U.S.
- Listed height: 6 ft 1 in (1.85 m)
- Listed weight: 245 lb (111 kg)

Career information
- College: Ole Miss
- NFL draft: 2007: undrafted

Career history
- Green Bay Packers (2007)*; New York Giants (2007–2008)*; Edmonton Eskimos (2009)*; Berlin Rebels (2010–2013); Berlin Adler (2014); Berlin Rebels (2015–2022)
- * Offseason or practice squad member only

Awards and highlights
- Mississippi Junior College defensive player of year

Rory L. Johnson (born March 15, 1986) is an American football linebacker who is currently coaching for the Berlin Rebels in the German Football League (GFL) the team in which he played linebacker for several seasons. He was signed by the Green Bay Packers as an undrafted free agent in 2007. He played college football at Mississippi.

Johnson has also been a member of the New York Giants and Edmonton Eskimos.

== College career ==
Johnson then attended Hinds Community College where he earned junior college honorable mention All-America honors before transferring to the University of Mississippi for one season.

== Professional career ==
=== Green Bay Packers ===
After going undrafted in the 2007 NFL draft, Johnson signed with the Green Bay Packers on May 4, 2007. On September 1, he was released by the Packers in order to get their roster down to the league maximum.

=== Edmonton Eskimos ===
Johnson was signed by the Edmonton Eskimos on May 6, 2009. He was released on June 6, 2009.

=== Berlin Rebels ===
Since 2010 Johnson has played in the German Football League for the Berlin Rebels and the Berlin Adler. He last appeared in week 10 of the 2022 season and is currently functioning as the Linebacker Coach for the Berlin Rebels.
