= Byram Bridge =

- U.S. National Register of Historic Places
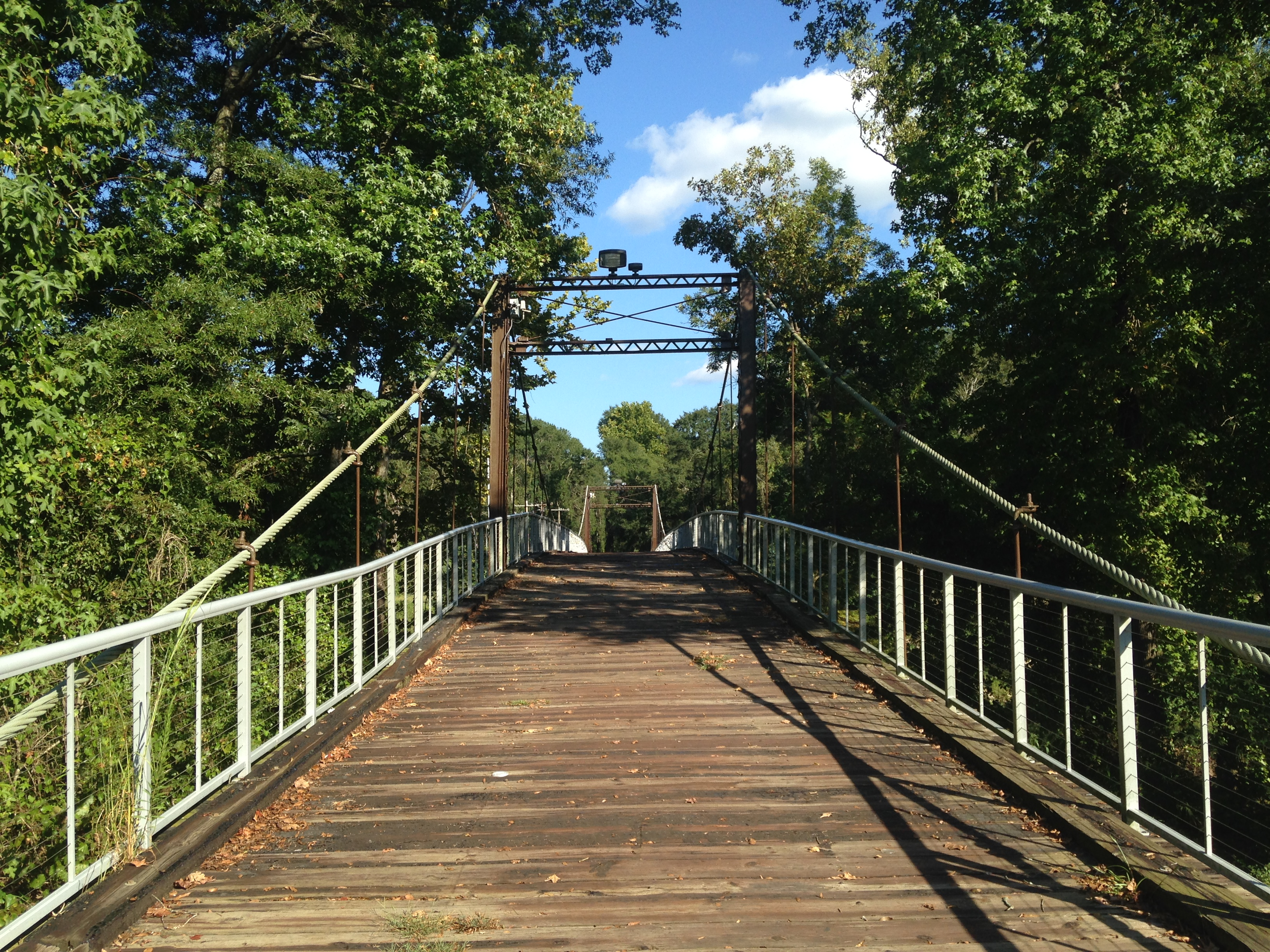

- Location within Mississippi
- Nearest city: Frenchs Store, Mississippi
- Coordinates: 32°10′35″N 90°14′37″W
- Area: 2 acres (0.81 ha)
- Built: 1905
- Built by: Schuster & Jacob; Groome, W.H. & Son
- Architectural style: Twin-tower swinging sus. br.
- MPS: Swinging Suspension Bridges TR
- NRHP reference No.: 79003427
- Added to NRHP: May 23, 1979

The Byram Bridge, spanning the Pearl River between Hinds County, Mississippi and Rankin County, Mississippi, is a historic bridge which was listed on the National Register of Historic Places in 1979.

The bridge was built in 1905 as a collaboration between merchants in Byram, Mississippi and Rankin County. In 1987, the bridge was deemed unsafe for travel and was closed to traffic. The bridge was converted to a pedestrian footbridge in 2015.

It is located at Old Byram and Florence Rd. near Frenchs Store, Mississippi.

It is a swinging suspension bridge type of suspension bridge, with two towers, nearly 360 feet (110 m) in total length. The central span is about 200 feet (61 m).
