= Cap Tyson =

American baseball catcher (1903–1973)

- Catcher
- Born: February 10, 1903; Bolton, Mississippi, U.S.
- Died: March 28, 1973 (aged 70); Chicago, Illinois, U.S.
- Batted: Right Threw: Right

Negro league baseball debut
- 1938, for the Birmingham Black Barons

Last appearance
- 1941, for the Birmingham Black Barons

Teams
- Birmingham Black Barons (1938, 1940-1941)

Armand Cupree "Cap" Tyson (February 10, 1903 – March 28, 1973) was an American professional baseball catcher in the Negro leagues. He played with the Birmingham Black Barons in 1938, 1940, and 1941.
