= Henry L. Brown =

American physician (1876–1960)

- Born: December 9, 1896; Terry, Mississippi, US
- Died: January 12, 1960 (aged 83); Laurel, Mississippi, US
- Education: Jackson College; Leonard Medical School (1905)
- Occupation: Physician
- Title: Captain; First Lieutenant

Henry L. Brown, M.D. (December 9, 1876 – January 12, 1960) was an American physician. He served in World War I (as a part of the Medical Reserve Corps) as commanding officer of 366th Ambulance Company in the 317th Sanitary Train. He later was promoted to a Captain.

== Early life ==
Brown was born on December 9, 1876, in Terry, Mississippi. Not much is known about his early life, only that he worked in many rural farms to make ends meet and to pay for school. He graduated from Jackson College located in Laurel, Mississippi and went on to attend Leonard Medical School. He graduated from there in 1905 and started his own practice in Laurel.

== Military service ==
In 1917, the United States joined World War I and the entire nation was in a buzz to join the effort. After the declaration of war with Germany, many African-Americans were turned away from the local recruiting stations. Unprepared for a large scale conflict, the United States Army had only four black regiments, and many commanders would not allow mixing of blacks and whites in their units. Also, the black regiments themselves were not trusted to be sent to Europe, as many of the higher ups possessed a lack of confidence in black soldiers as fighters. Fort Des Moines Provisional Army Officer Training School had been opened for training African-American men as there had been a huge influx of African-American volunteers and a petition was erected by the students of Howard University. However, there was still some discontent at the facility as many soldiers found that he had been unfairly assessed for merely being black.

When Brown answered the military's call for physicians he was immediately given the rank, First Lieutenant in the Army Medical Reserve Corps. Like all the African-American recruits, Brown was sent to Fort Des Moines for medical training at the Medical Officers Training Camp. Brown was 41 years old and had been practicing medicine for 12 years. After completing his training, Brown was assigned as a medical and commanding officer of the 366th ambulance Company in the 317th Sanitary Train. Brown was in charge of reporting the conditions of the field and proposing means of improving evacuation and first aid techniques. He adjusted well and was promoted to Captain in October.

At the conclusion of the war, Captain Brown was honorably discharged and he returned to Laurel to continue his work.

== Career ==
Brown returned to laurel and became very involved in civic programs and did frequent work with the local businessman. He was a member of the American Legion. Brown was also mentioned often in the local newspapers for his medical work.

== Personal life ==
Brown never married as he dedicated his life in service to the community.

Brown died on January 12, 1960, aged 83. He donated his materials to the local library. He is buried at Nora Davis Cemetery in Laurel, Mississippi.
