= William DeLoach Cope =

American politician

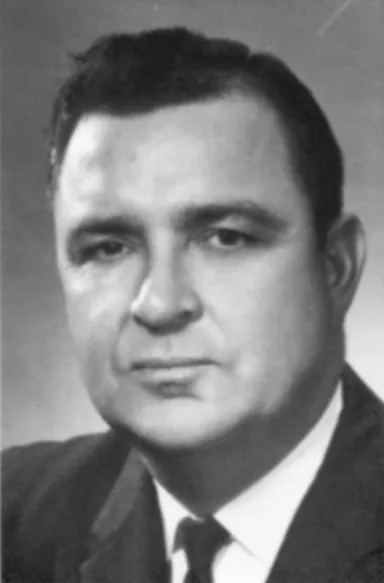

Member of the Mississippi House of Representatives
- In office 1960–???

Personal details
- Born: October 12, 1921 Hollandale, Mississippi, U.S.
- Died: March 23, 2015 (aged 93)
- Education: Millsaps College; University of Mississippi

William DeLoach Cope (October 12, 1921 – March 23, 2015) was an American politician. He served as a member of the Mississippi House of Representatives.

== Life and career ==
Cope was born in Hollandale, Mississippi. He attended Hollandale High School, Millsaps College and the University of Mississippi. He served in the United States Navy.

In 1960, Cope was elected to the Mississippi House of Representatives.

He farmed, hunted, and served as insurance commissioner.

Cope died in March 2015, at the age of 93.
