= George C. Osborn =

American historian (1904–1982)

George Coleman Osborn
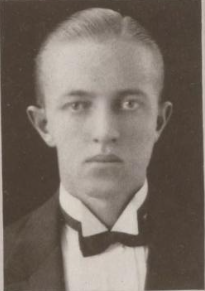
- Born: May 15, 1904; Learned, Mississippi, U.S.
- Died: August 23, 1982 (aged 78); Gainesville, Florida, U.S.
- Education: Mississippi College, Indiana University Bloomington
- Occupation(s): Historian, professor, author
- Spouse: Margaret McMillen (m. 1936)
- Children: 2

George Coleman Osborn (1904–1982) was an American historian, professor, and author. He wrote non-fiction about Southern history and biographies. He wrote books about John Sharp Williams, Woodrow Wilson, John James Tigert and James Kimble Vardaman.

== Early life and education ==
George Coleman Osborn was born on May 15, 1904 in Learned, Mississippi, to parents Bettie Mae (née Hendrick) and Samuel George Osborn.

He graduated from Mississippi College with a B.A. degree in 1927. He received his A.M. degree in 1932 and Ph.D. in 1938 from Indiana University Bloomington. On May 20, 1936, Osborn married Margaret McMillen, and together they had two children.

== Career ==
Between 1935 and 1941, he was the chairman of the social services department at Berry College in Mount Berry, Georgia. He also taught at the University of Mississippi (1943–1944); Memphis State University (now University of Memphis; 1944–1947); University of Florida (1947–1974); and Wallace State Junior College (1974–1977).

In 1943, he wrote the book, John Sharp Williams: Planter-Statesman of the Deep South, which was reviewed in the Indiana Magazine of History.

A collection of Osborn's research materials are at the University of Mississippi Libraries.

Osborn died on August 23, 1982 in Gainesville, Florida.

== Publications ==
- Osborn, George Coleman (1932). Career of John Sharp Williams in the House of Representatives, 1893–1909. University of Indiana.
- Osborn, George C. (1943). John Sharp Williams: Planter-Statesman of the Deep South. Louisiana State University Press.
- Osborn, George C. (1958). "Woodrow Wilson's First Romance". Ohio Historical Quarterly. 67 (1).
- Osborn, George Coleman (1968). Woodrow Wilson, The Early Years. Baton Rouge, LA: Louisiana State University Press. ISBN 9780807106365.
- Osborn, George Coleman (1974). John James Tigert: American Educator. University Press of Florida. ISBN 9780783749471.
- Osborn, George Coleman (1980). Woodrow Wilson in British Opinion and Thought. Alachua County Printing and Publishing.
- Osborn, George Coleman (1981). James Kimble Vardaman, Southern Commoner. G.C. Osborn.
- Osborn, George Coleman (1970). The First Baptist Church, Gainesville, Florida, 1870–1970. Storter Print. Company. OCLC 1722145.
