= Jeremy Williams (Canadian football) =

American gridiron football player (born 1991)

No. 37
- Position: Defensive back

Personal information
- Born: August 9, 1991 (age 35); Raymond, Mississippi, U.S.
- Listed height: 6 ft 0 in (1.83 m)
- Listed weight: 204 lb (93 kg)

Career information
- High school: Raymond (Mississippi)
- College: Henderson State

Career history
- 2014: Calgary Stampeders
- 2015: Edmonton Eskimos*
- * Offseason or practice squad member only

Awards and highlights
- Grey Cup champion (2014)
- Stats at CFL.ca (archive)

Jeremy Williams (born August 9, 1991) is an American former professional football defensive back. He played college football at Hinds and Henderson State. He was a member of the Calgary Stampeders and Edmonton Eskimos of the Canadian Football League (CFL).

== Early life ==
Williams played high school football at Raymond High School in Raymond, Mississippi. He earned All-District honors three times. He garnered District 3A MVP and Second-Team All-State recognition his senior season after recording 97 tackles and seven interceptions. Williams also lettered in basketball and track. He was a captain on the basketball team, where he earned All-State honors and averaged thirteen points and twelve rebounds per game.

== College career ==
Williams first played college football for the Hinds Eagles of Hinds Community College. He played in eight games for the Hinds Eagles his freshman year in 2009, recording 26 solo tackles and one tackle assist. He played in nine games, all starts, for the team in 2010, accumulating twenty solo tackles, three tackle assists, two pass breakups and one interception.

Williams then transferred to play for the Henderson State Reddies of Henderson State University. He accumulated 29 tackles in ten games in 2011. He also recorded a sack and forced a fumble against West Georgia and broke up three passes against Ouachita Baptist in 2011. On October 1, 2012, Williams was named the Great American Conference Defensive Player of the Week after recording eight total tackles, 1.5 sacks, two pass break ups and an interception that was returned for thirty yards in a win over Southwestern Oklahoma. He garnered Second Team All-GAC accolades his senior year in 2012. He totaled 34 solo tackles, 32 tackle assists, three interceptions, 1.5 sacks, two forced fumbles, one fumble recovery and five pass breakups during the 2012 season. Williams majored in sociology at Henderson State.

== Professional career ==
Pre-draft measurables
Height	Weight	40-yard dash	10-yard split	20-yard split	20-yard shuttle	Three-cone drill	Vertical jump	Broad jump
5 ft 10 in (1.78 m)	208 lb (94 kg)	4.58 s	1.55 s	2.53 s	4.43 s	6.94 s	36 in (0.91 m)	9 ft 2 in (2.79 m)
All values from Pro Day

Williams participated in rookie minicamp on a tryout basis with the St. Louis Rams in May 2013 after going undrafted in the 2013 NFL draft.

Williams signed with the Calgary Stampeders in May 2014. He played in two games for the team during the 2014 regular season. The Stampeders won the 102nd Grey Cup against the Hamilton Tiger-Cats by a score of 20–16 on November 30, 2014. He was released by the Stampeders on June 14, 2015.

Williams was signed to the Edmonton Eskimos' practice roster on July 13, 2015. He was released by the Eskimos on August 20, 2015.

He was later selected in the 2016 Major League Football Draft.
