= Bolton, Mississippi =

- Town
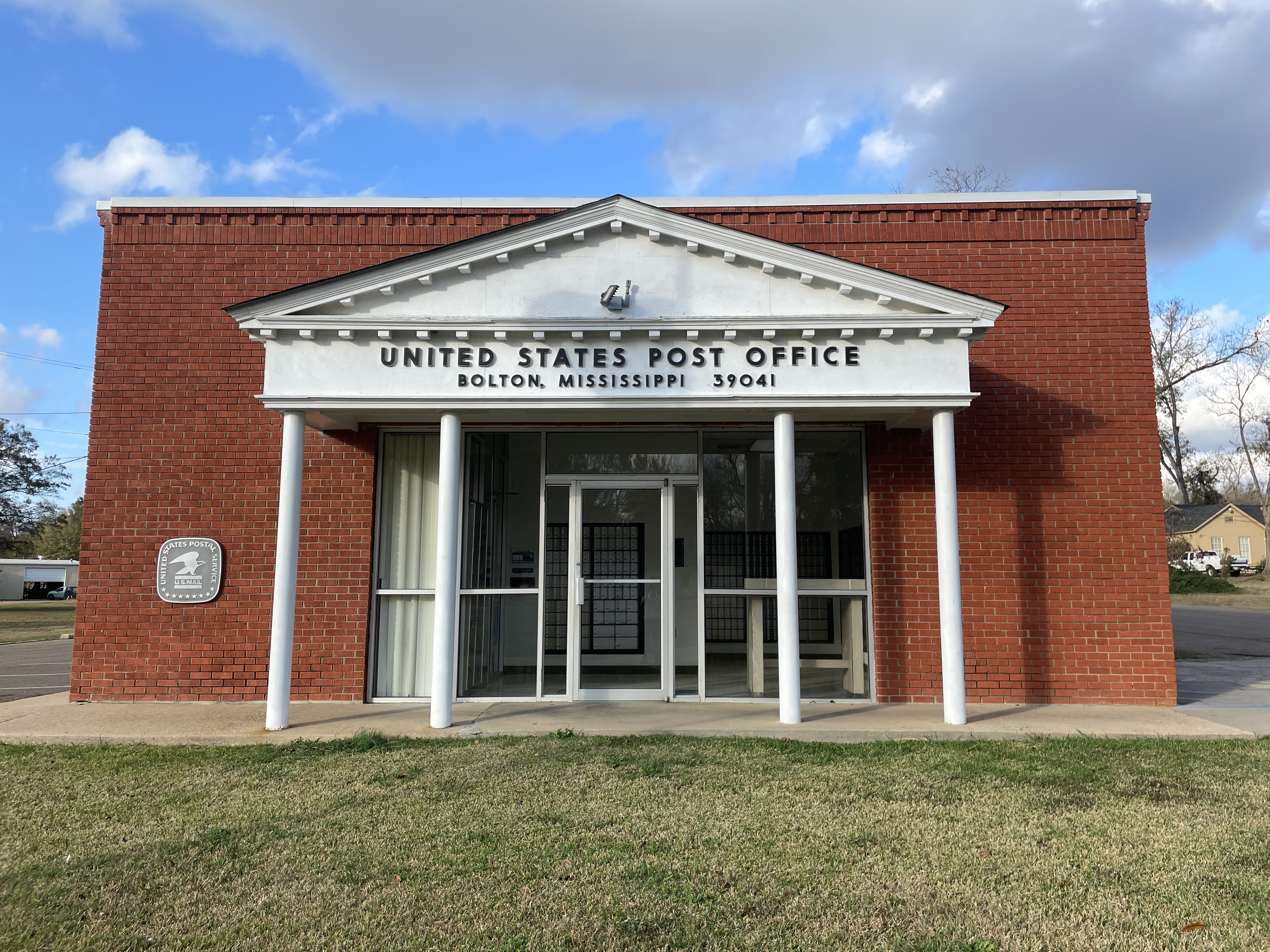
- Bolton Post Office

- Location of Bolton, Mississippi

- Location in the United States
- Coordinates: 32°21′17″N 90°27′31″W
- Country: United States
- State: Mississippi
- County: Hinds

Area
  - Total: 1.52 sq mi (3.93 km^{2})
  - Land: 1.52 sq mi (3.93 km^{2})
  - Water: 0 sq mi (0.00 km^{2})
- Elevation: 226 ft (69 m)

Population (2020)
  - Total: 441
  - Density: 290.3/sq mi (112.08/km^{2})
- Time zone: UTC-6 (Central (CST))
  - Summer (DST): UTC-5 (CDT)
- ZIP code: 39041
- Area code: 601
- FIPS code: 28-07540
- GNIS feature ID: 2405299
- Website: townofboltonms.com

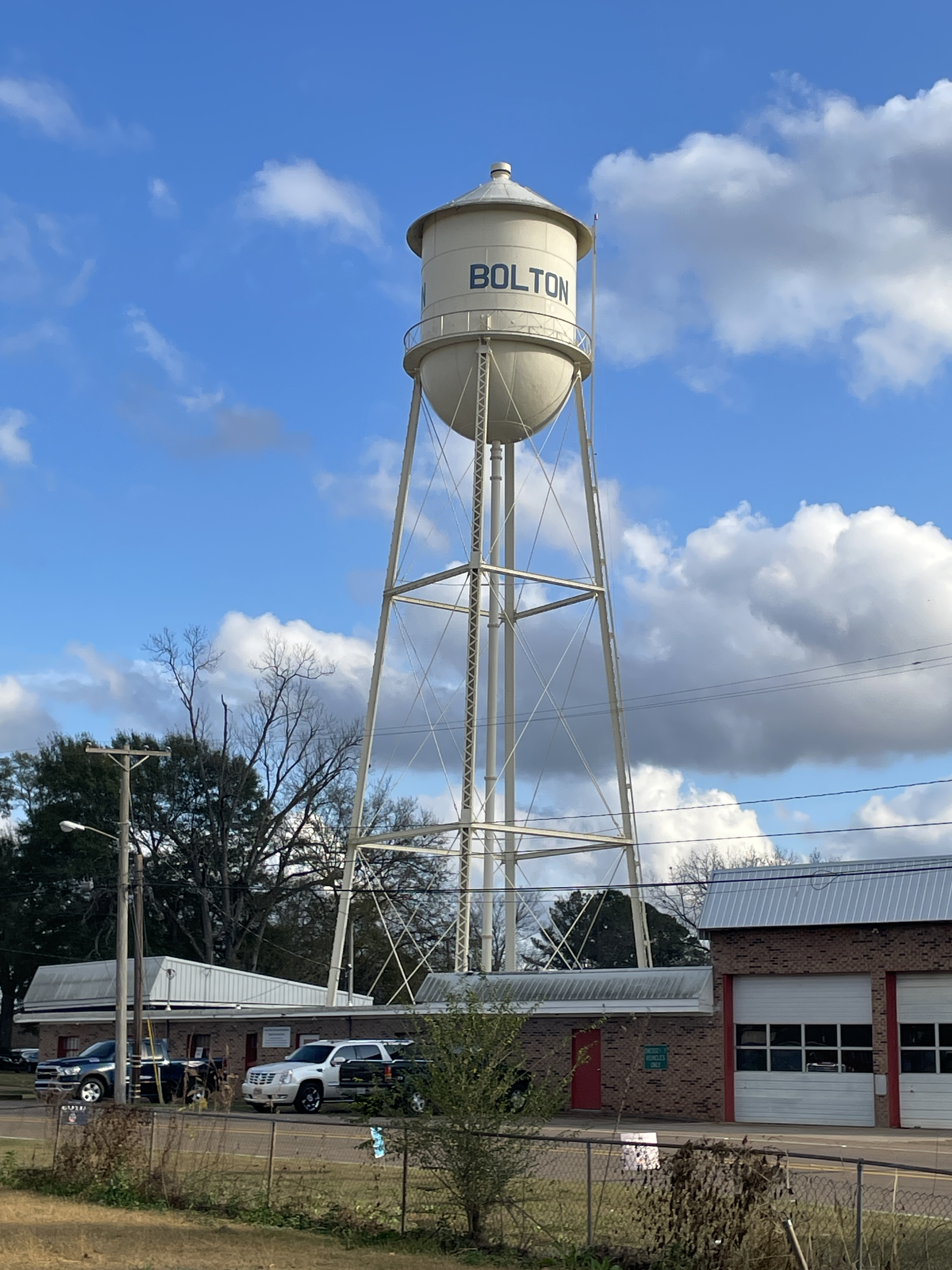
Bolton water tower.

Bolton is a town in Hinds County, Mississippi, United States. As of the 2020 census, Bolton had a population of 441. It is part of the Jackson Metropolitan Statistical Area.

== Geography ==
Bolton is in north-central Hinds County, in the valley of Bakers Creek, part of the Big Black River watershed. Interstate 20 runs through the northern part of the town, with access from Exit 27. I-20 leads east 18 miles (29 km) to Jackson, the state capital, and west 25 miles (40 km) to Vicksburg.

According to the United States Census Bureau, Bolton has a total area of 1.5 square miles (3.9 km^{2}), all land.

== Demographics ==
Historical population
Census	Pop.	Note	%±
1880	440		—
1900	600		—
1910	632		5.3%
1920	494		−21.8%
1930	441		−10.7%
1940	627		42.2%
1950	741		18.2%
1960	797		7.6%
1970	787		−1.3%
1980	664		−15.6%
1990	637		−4.1%
2000	629		−1.3%
2010	567		−9.9%
2020	441		−22.2%
U.S. Decennial Census

=== Racial and ethnic composition ===
Bolton town, Mississippi – Racial and ethnic composition Note: the US Census treats Hispanic/Latino as an ethnic category. This table excludes Latinos from the racial categories and assigns them to a separate category. Hispanics/Latinos may be of any race.
Race / Ethnicity (NH = Non-Hispanic)	Pop 2000	Pop 2010	Pop 2020	% 2000	% 2010	% 2020
White alone (NH)	199	149	112	31.64%	26.28%	25.40%
Black or African American alone (NH)	418	415	320	66.45%	73.19%	72.56%
Native American or Alaska Native alone (NH)	0	0	0	0.00%	0.00%	0.00%
Asian alone (NH)	0	0	0	0.00%	0.00%	0.00%
Native Hawaiian or Pacific Islander alone (NH)	0	0	0	0.00%	0.00%	0.00%
Other race alone (NH)	0	0	0	0.00%	0.00%	0.00%
Mixed race or Multiracial (NH)	10	2	6	1.59%	0.35%	1.36%
Hispanic or Latino (any race)	2	1	3	0.32%	0.18%	0.68%
Total	629	567	441	100.00%	100.00%	100.00%

=== 2020 census ===
As of the 2020 United States census, there were 441 people, 271 households, and 201 families residing in the town.

=== 2010 census ===
As of the 2010 United States census, there were 567 people living in the town. The racial makeup of the town was 73.2% Black, 26.3% White and 0.4% from two or more races. 0.2% were Hispanic or Latino of any race.

=== 2000 census ===
As of the census of 2000, there were 629 people, 246 households, and 157 families living in the town. The population density was 410.4 inhabitants per square mile (158.5/km^{2}). There were 261 housing units at an average density of 170.3 per square mile (65.8/km^{2}). The racial makeup of the town was 66.77% African American, 31.64% White and 1.59% from two or more races. Hispanic or Latino of any race were 0.32% of the population.

There were 246 households, out of which 29.3% had children under the age of 18 living with them, 34.6% were married couples living together, 24.4% had a female householder with no husband present, and 35.8% were non-families. 32.1% of all households were made up of individuals, and 13.8% had someone living alone who was 65 years of age or older. The average household size was 2.56 and the average family size was 3.28.

In the town, the population was spread out, with 28.9% under the age of 18, 8.4% from 18 to 24, 27.8% from 25 to 44, 19.2% from 45 to 64, and 15.6% who were 65 years of age or older. The median age was 36 years. For every 100 females there were 85.5 males. For every 100 females age 18 and over, there were 72.6 males.

The median income for a household in the town was $28,833, and the median income for a family was $50,208. Males had a median income of $27,159 versus $24,479 for females. The per capita income for the town was $27,271. About 15.5% of families and 21.4% of the population were below the poverty line, including 37.3% of those under age 18 and 14.7% of those age 65 or over.

== Education ==
Bolton is served by the Hinds County School District, and is zoned to Bolton/Edwards Elementary-Middle School and Raymond High School in Raymond.

Jackson/Hinds Library System operates the Annie Thompson Jeffers Library in Bolton.

== Notable people ==
- Bo Carter, early blues singer and guitarist
- Sam Chatmon, Delta blues guitarist
- Robert Crook, Mississippi politician and lawyer
- Deborah Butler Dixon, member of the Mississippi House of Representatives from 2012 to 2020
- Sasha Goodlett, professional basketball player
- Cleveland Green, former NFL player for the Miami Dolphins
- Alan Huffman, writer and journalist (Mississippi in Africa)
- Charley Patton, early blues musician
- Calvin Smith, Olympic gold and bronze medal winning athlete
- Lucille Spann, Chicago Blues singer
- Bennie Thompson, member of the United States House of Representatives
- Cap Tyson, Negro league baseball player
- Walter Vinson, Memphis blues singer, guitarist and songwriter
