= Sam Chatmon =

American Delta blues musician (1897–1983)

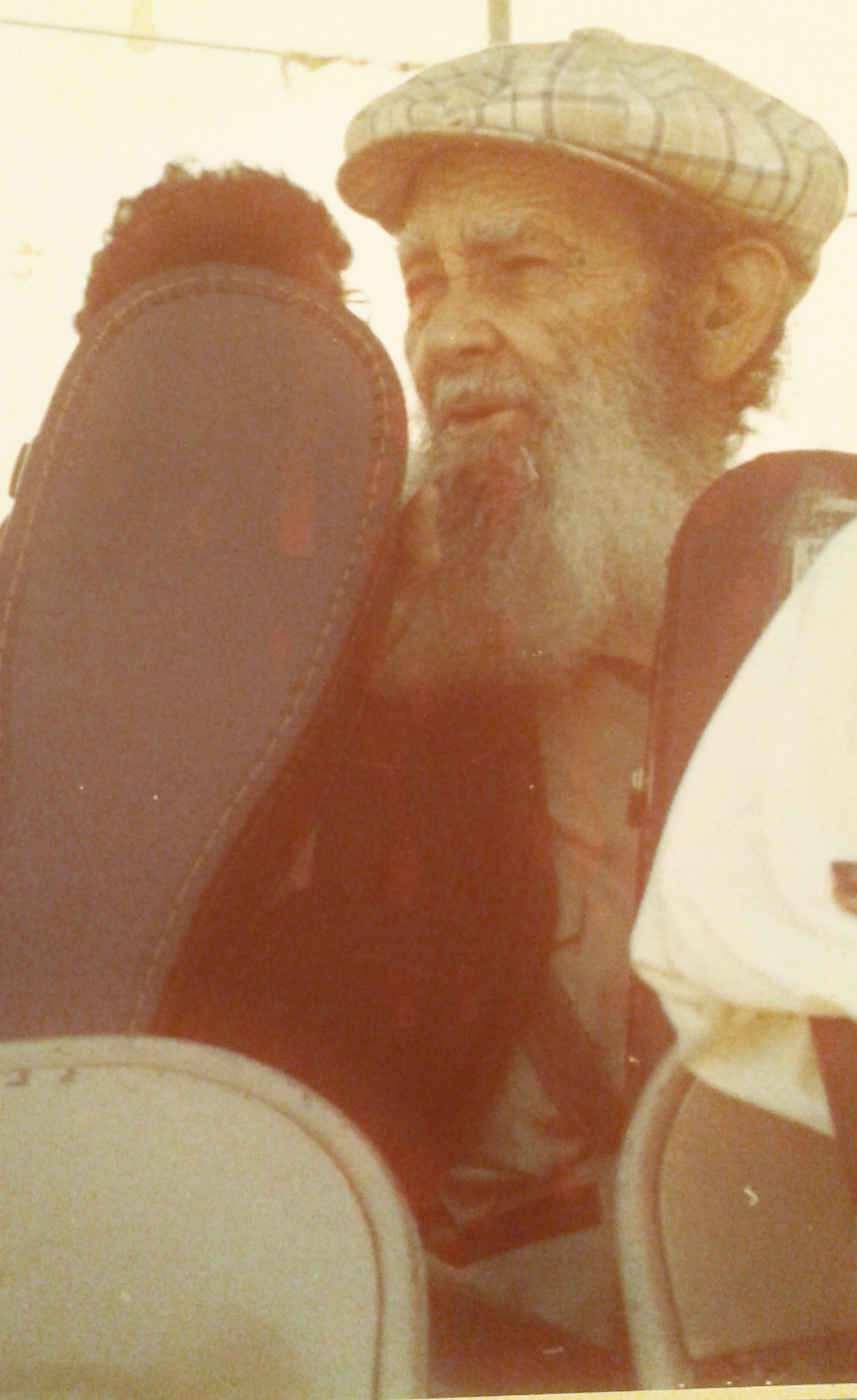
- Sam Chatmon, c. 1970s

Background information
- Born: Vivian Chatmon; January 10, 1897; Bolton, Mississippi, U.S.
- Died: February 2, 1983 (aged 86) Hollandale, Mississippi, U.S.
- Genres: Delta blues
- Occupations: Musician; songwriter
- Instruments: Guitar; vocals
- Formerly of: The Mississippi Sheiks

Vivian "Sam" Chatmon (January 10, 1897 – February 2, 1983) was an American Delta blues guitarist and singer who was a member of the Mississippi Sheiks.

== Life and career ==
Chatmon was born in Bolton, Mississippi. His family was well known in Mississippi for their musical talents; he was a member of the family's string band when he was young. He may have been Charley Patton's half-brother. In an interview he stated that he started playing the guitar at the age of three, laying it flat on the floor and crawling under it. A year older and he recalled singing a song including the lyrics "Run down to the river thought I'd jump an' drown / I thought about the woman I lovin' and I turn around". He regularly performed for white audiences in the 1900s.

The Chatmon band played rags, ballads, and popular dance tunes. Two of Sam's brothers, the fiddler Lonnie Chatmon and the guitarist Bo Carter, performed with the guitarist Walter Vinson as the Mississippi Sheiks.

Chatmon played the banjo, mandolin and harmonica in addition to the guitar. He performed at parties and on street corners throughout Mississippi for small pay and tips. In the 1930s, he recorded with the Sheiks and also with his brother Lonnie as the Chatman Brothers.

Chatmon moved to Hollandale, Mississippi in the early 1940s and worked on plantations there. He was rediscovered in 1960 and started a new chapter of his career as a folk-blues artist. In the same year he recorded for Arhoolie Records. He toured extensively during the 1960s and 1970s. While in California in 1970, he made several recordings with Sue Draheim, Kenny Hall, Ed Littlefield, Lou Curtiss, Kathy Hall, Will Scarlett and others at Sweet's Mill Music Camp, forming a group he called "The California Sheiks". He played many of the largest and best-known folk festivals, including the Smithsonian Folklife Festival in Washington, D.C., in 1972, the Mariposa Folk Festival in Toronto in 1974, and the New Orleans Jazz & Heritage Festival in 1976.

Sam Chatmon died on February 2, 1983, in Hollandale, Mississippi, aged 86. A headstone memorial to Chatmon with the inscription "Sitting on top of the World" was paid for by Bonnie Raitt through the Mount Zion Memorial Fund. It was placed in Sanders Memorial Cemetery, Hollandale, Mississippi, on March 14, 1998, in a ceremony held at the Hollandale Municipal Building, celebrated by the Mayor and members of the city council of Hollandale, with over 100 attendees. Chatmon was later honored with a marker on the Mississippi Blues Trail.

== Discography ==
=== Studio albums ===
- Sam Chatmon: The Mississippi Sheik (Blue Goose, 1970)
- Hollandale Blues (Albatros, 1977)
- Sam Chatmon's Advice (Rounder, 1979)
- Sam Chatmon & His Barbecue Boys (Flying Fish, 1981)

=== Compilations ===
- Sam Chatmon 1970–1974 (Flyright, 1999)
- Field Recordings from Hollandale, Mississippi (1976–1982) (Mbirafon, 2009)
