= Hinds Community College =

Public college in Raymond, Mississippi, US

- Type: Public community college
- Established: 1917; 109 years ago
- Academic affiliations: Space-grant
- President: Stephen Vacik
- Location: Raymond, Mississippi, United States; 32°15′30″N 90°24′56″W
- Colors: Maroon and White
- Mascot: Eagles
- Website: www.hindscc.edu

Hinds Community College is a public community college with its main campus in Raymond, Mississippi, United States and branches in Jackson, Pearl, Utica, and Vicksburg.

The Hinds Community College District includes the counties of Hinds, Claiborne, Copiah, Rankin, and Warren. With an enrollment of over 12,000 students at six campuses, it is the largest community college in Mississippi.

== Academics ==
The college currently provides academic college-level courses for the first two years of four-year degree programs that must be completed at senior colleges or universities. It also provides two-year technical degree programs, post-secondary career (formerly called "vocational") programs, secondary (high-school) career education, and short-term training and continuing education.

== History ==
The Utica campus of Hinds Community College, formerly "Utica Junior College', was founded in 1903 as Utica Normal and Industrial Institute by Tuskegee graduate William H. Holtzclaw.

The Raymond campus began as a small agricultural high school in 1917 with 117 students and eight faculty members. In its transformation into a junior college, it began offering college-level academic courses in 1922 and was accredited by the Southern Association of Colleges and Schools in 1926.

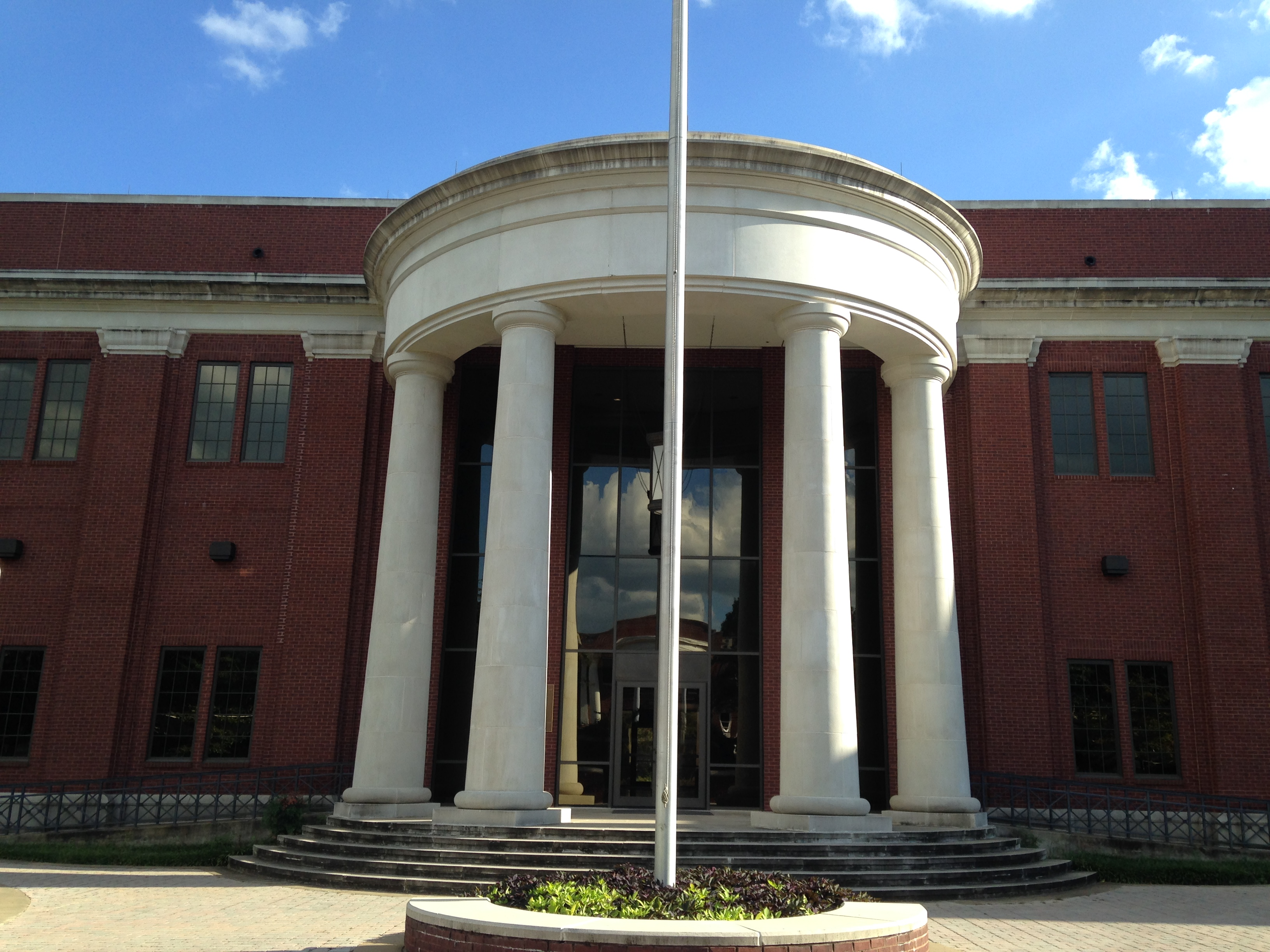
Main Hall

During the World War II years, a vocational education curriculum was added to the college's offerings, and in the late 1960s, technical degree programs were added.

Branch locations in Jackson and Vicksburg were opened in the 1970s. These branches primarily offered high school vocational education, though some college-level night courses were taught. Utica Junior College, a historically black college whose history dates to 1903, merged with Hinds Junior College in 1982 under Federal court order as part of a class action racial discrimination lawsuit.

The Pearl-Rankin Vocational/Career Center was opened in the city of Pearl in 1983, offering high school vocational education and some college-level night courses. This branch later became the Rankin Campus; it now offers academic, technical, and career programs.

The Nursing Allied Health Center was opened in Jackson in 1984, offering nursing and other medical and dental programs. This center, together with the existing branch in Jackson, became known as the Jackson Campus. A Resource and Coordinating Unit for Economic Development (RCU) was added in 1988 in Raymond, and the Eagle Ridge Conference Center was opened in 1996 under the administration of the RCU. The Vicksburg branch became the Vicksburg Campus in 2002 and now offers college-level programs.

Hinds Junior College changed its name to Hinds Community College in 1987; that year 13 of the 14 other Mississippi public two-year colleges also adopted the "community" label. Hinds linked up with other two-year colleges by means of the Community College Network (CCN) in 1994. This system allows a course to be offered at one college location while students may participate in the course at several other college locations by means of video conferencing. All of the state public two-year colleges formed the Mississippi Virtual Community College (MVCC) in 1999 to offer courses to students over the Internet.

== Campuses ==
- Raymond Campus, Raymond
- Jackson Campus
- Nursing Allied Health Center
- Rankin Campus, Pearl
- Rankin nursing campus, Brandon
- Utica Campus, unincorporated Hinds County, south of Utica
- Vicksburg-Warren Campus, Vicksburg
- Aviation Maintenance/Commercial Aviation, John Bell Williams Airport, Raymond

Hinds Agricultural High School, at the Utica campus, was previously operated by the community college.

== Notable alumni ==
- Maurice Black, legislator, Assistant Attorney General of Mississippi
- Anquan Boldin, professional football player
- Chad Bradford, professional baseball player
- Corey Bradford, professional football player
- Phil Bryant, 64th Governor of Mississippi
- Malcolm Butler, professional football player
- John Copeland, professional football player
- Beasley Denson, former Tribal Chief of the Mississippi Band of Choctaw Indians
- Antonio Gibson, professional football player
- Jeff Henderson, 2016 Rio Olympics Gold Medalist in long jump
- Faith Hill, Country music singer
- John Hightower, professional football player
- Grady Jackson, professional football player
- Rory Johnson, professional football player
- Tommy Kelly, professional football player
- Trell Kimmons, sprinter
- Earl Leggett, professional football player
- Leon Lett, professional football player
- Ryan McBean, professional football player
- Jerome McDougle, professional football player
- Mary Ann Mobley, Miss America 1959 - first Mississippian to win beauty pageant
- Joseph G. Moss, state legislator and judge for whom the school's athletic field is named
- Michael Myers, professional football player
- Derek Newton, professional football player
- Greg Peterson, professional football player
- Thomas Hal Phillips, author, screenwriter, and actor
- Eliza Pillars, nurse who trained midwives in Mississippi
- Pat Rapp, professional baseball player
- Fred Smoot, professional football player
- T. T. Toliver, professional football player
- Charvarius Ward, professional football player
- Marvin Washington, professional football player
- Jeremy Williams, professional football player
- John Bell Williams, former governor of Mississippi
- Thomas Jefferson Young, author
- Zig Ziglar, motivational speaker and author
