= Hinds County School District =

School district in Mississippi

Address
- 13192 Highway 18 Raymond, Mississippi, 39154; United States

District information
- Type: Public
- Grades: PreK–12
- NCES District ID: 2801860

Students and staff
- Students: 4,972 (2023-24)
- Teachers: 376.91 (FTE) (2023-24)
- Staff: 190.55
- Student–teacher ratio: 13.19 (2023-24)

Other information
- Website: www.hinds.k12.ms.us

The Hinds County School District is a public school district based in Raymond, Mississippi (US).

In addition to Raymond, the district serves the communities of Bolton, Byram, Edwards, Learned, Terry, and Utica, as well as sections of Jackson.

== Schools ==
High schools (Grades 9-12)

- Raymond High School
- Terry High School

K-8 schools

- Bolton-Edwards Elementary/Middle School
- Utica Elementary/Middle School

Middle schools (grades 6-8)

- Byram Middle School
- Carver Middle School

Elementary schools

- Raymond Elementary School (Grades K-5)
- Gary Road Intermediate School (Grades 3-5)
- Gary Road Elementary School (Grades K-2)

== School Feeder Patterns ==
- Bolton-Edwards Attendance Zone
  - Bolton-Edwards Elementary/Middle (K-8); Raymond High (9-12)
- Byram-Terry Attendance Zone
  - Gary Road Elementary School (K-2); Gary Road Intermediate (3-5); Byram Middle (6-8); Terry High (9-12)
- Raymond Attendance Zone
  - Raymond Elementary (K-5); Carver Middle (6-8); Raymond High (9-12)
- Utica Attendance Zone (includes Learned)
  - Utica Elementary/Middle (K-8); Raymond High (9-12)

== Demographics ==
=== 2006-07 school year ===
There were a total of about 6,417 students enrolled in the Hinds County School District during the 2006–2007 school year. The gender makeup of the district was 49% female and 51% male. The racial makeup of the district was 61.31% African American, 37.54% White, 0.53% Hispanic, and 0.62% Asian. 43.1% of the district's students were eligible to receive free lunch.

=== Previous school years ===
School Year	Enrollment	Gender Makeup		Racial Makeup				
School Year	Enrollment	Female	Male	Asian	African American	Hispanic	Native American	White
2005-06	6,353	49%	51%	0.36%	60.62%	0.61%	–	38.41%
2004-05	6,042	49%	51%	0.25%	58.66%	0.50%	–	40.60%
2003-04	5,776	49%	51%	0.16%	56.65%	0.66%	0.03%	42.50%
2002-03	5,769	49%	51%	0.14%	56.39%	0.43%	0.03%	43.01%

== Accountability statistics ==
	2006-07	2005-06	2004-05	2003-04	2002-03
District Accreditation Status	Accredited	Accredited	Accredited	Accredited	Accredited
School Performance Classifications
Level 5 (Superior Performing) Schools	2	3	2	4	0
Level 4 (Exemplary) Schools	3	1	2	1	3
Level 3 (Successful) Schools	3	3	3	3	4
Level 2 (Under Performing) Schools	0	0	0	0	1
Level 1 (Low Performing) Schools	0	0	0	0	0
Not Assigned	1	1	1	1	1

== See also ==
- List of school districts in Mississippi
