= Bo Carter =

American blues musician (1893–1964)

Background information
- Born: Armenter Chatmon or Armentia Chatmon; March 21, 1893 or January 1894; Bolton, Mississippi, U.S.
- Died: September 21, 1964 (aged 70-71) Memphis, Tennessee, U.S.
- Genres: Delta blues; Country blues
- Occupations: Musician; Songwriter
- Instruments: Vocals; Guitar
- Years active: 1928–1944

Armenter (or Armentia) Chatmon (March 21, 1893 or January 1894 – September 21, 1964), known as Bo Carter, was an early American blues musician. He was a member of the Mississippi Sheiks in concerts and on a few of their recordings. He also managed that group, which included his brothers Lonnie Chatmon on fiddle and, occasionally, Sam Chatmon on bass, and their friend Walter Vinson on guitar and lead vocals.

== Career ==
He was born in Bolton, Mississippi. Since the 1960s, Carter has become best known for his bawdy songs, such as "Let Me Roll Your Lemon", "Banana in Your Fruit Basket", "Pin in Your Cushion", "Your Biscuits Are Big Enough for Me", "Please Warm My Wiener", "All Around Man" and "My Pencil Won't Write No More". However, his output was not limited to dirty blues. In 1928, he recorded the original version of "Corrine, Corrina", which later became a hit for Big Joe Turner and has become a standard in various musical genres.

Carter and his brothers (including the pianist Harry Chatmon, who also made recordings) first learned music from their father, the fiddler Henderson Chatmon, a former slave, at their home on a plantation between Bolton and Edwards, Mississippi. Their mother, Eliza, also sang and played the guitar.

Carter made his recording debut in 1928, backing Alec Johnson, and was soon recording as a solo musician. He became one of the dominant blues recording acts of the 1930s, recording 110 sides. He also played with and managed the family group, the Mississippi Sheiks, and several other acts in the area. He and the Sheiks often performed for whites, playing the pop hits of the day and white-oriented dance music, as well as for blacks, playing a bluesier repertoire.

Carter went partly blind during the 1930s. He settled in Glen Allan, Mississippi, and despite his vision problems did some farming but also continued to play music and perform, sometimes with his brothers. He moved to Memphis, Tennessee, and worked outside the music industry in the 1940s.

Carter had several strokes and died of a cerebral hemorrhage at Shelby County Hospital, in Memphis, on September 21, 1964. He is buried in Nitta Yuma Cemetery, Sharkey County, Mississippi.

== Compilations ==
- Greatest Hits 1930-1940 (Yazoo, 1969)
- Twist It Babe 1931-1940 (Yazoo, 1973)
- Banana In Your Fruit Basket (Yazoo, 1980)
- The Best of Bo Carter Vol. 1 1928-1940 (Earl Archives, 1982)
- Bo Carter 1931-1940 (Old Tramp, 1987)
- Bo Carter 1928-1938 (Document, 1988)
- The Rarest Bo Carter Vol. 2 1930-1938 (Earl Archives, 1989)
- Bo Carter Vol. 1-5 (Document, 1991)
- Bo Carter's Advice (Catfish, 2000)
- The Essential Bo Carter (Document, 2003)
- The Country Farm Blues (P-Vine, 2011)
- Bo Carter & The Mississippi Sheiks (JSP, 2012)

== Selected songs ==
- "Corrine, Corrina", 1928 (Brunswick)
- "All Around Man", 1931 (Bluebird)
- "Your Biscuits Are Big Enough for Me", 1936
- "Old Devil", 1938 (Bluebird)

== Influence ==
Carter's style of playing the guitar and his songwriting have won him fans long after he died. One of the most notable examples is the Irish blues rock guitarist Rory Gallagher, who performed several of Carter's songs, including "All Around Man."

Carter was not related to former Southwest and Big 12 Conference assistant commissioner Sam T. (Bo) Carter.
