= Simmons High School (Mississippi) =

High School in Mississippi

Coordinates: 33.1668°N 90.8596°W

Location
- 501 West Washington Street; Hollandale, Mississippi 38748; United States

Information
- Founded: 1891
- School district: Hollandale School District
- NCES District ID: 2801890
- Superintendent: Mario Willis
- NCES School ID: 280189001037
- Teaching staff: 18.64 (FTE)
- Grades: 7–12
- Enrollment: 155 (2022–2023)
- Student to teacher ratio: 8.32
- Color(s): Royal blue and white
- Mascot: Blue Devils
- Website: https://www.hollandalesd.org/

Simmons High School is a secondary school in Hollandale, Mississippi. It serves grades 7–12.

== History ==
The school was originally established in 1891 as "Hollandale Colored School". The building was a one-room schoolhouse with no windows or ceiling. In 1923, the one-room schoolhouse was replaced with a larger multi-room brick building. In 1950, Hollandale Colored School was renamed "Simmons High School" in honor of educator and former slave Emory Peter "E.P." Simmons.

== Athletics ==
In 1970, the football team was established. Blue Devils are the school mascot. Blue and white are the school colors. The Blue Devils won state championship titles for division 1A in 2015, 2016, and 2017. In 2021 it lost the championship to Bay Springs High School.

== Demographics ==
The demographic breakdown by race/ethnicity of the 225 students enrolled for the 2019–2020 school year was:

- Black - 99.1%
- Hispanic - 0.9%

The entire student body is categorized as economically disadvantaged. It is in the Hollandale School District.

== Alumni ==
- Larry Smith, NBA basketball player
