= Terry High School (Mississippi) =

Senior high school in Terry, Mississippi

Coordinates: 32.0947°N 90.3026°W

Location
- 235 West Beasley Street; Terry, (Hinds County), Mississippi 39170; United States

Information
- Type: Public high school
- School district: Hinds County School District
- Principal: Joyce Toaster
- Staff: 72.68 (FTE)
- Enrollment: 1,100 (2023-2024)
- Student to teacher ratio: 15.13
- Colors: Maroon and gray
- Mascot: Bulldogs
- Website: www.hinds.k12.ms.us/o/ths

Terry High School is a suburban public high school located in Terry, Mississippi, United States. It is a part of the Hinds County School District.

It serves Terry, Byram, and sections of Jackson.
