= Terry, Mississippi =

- Town
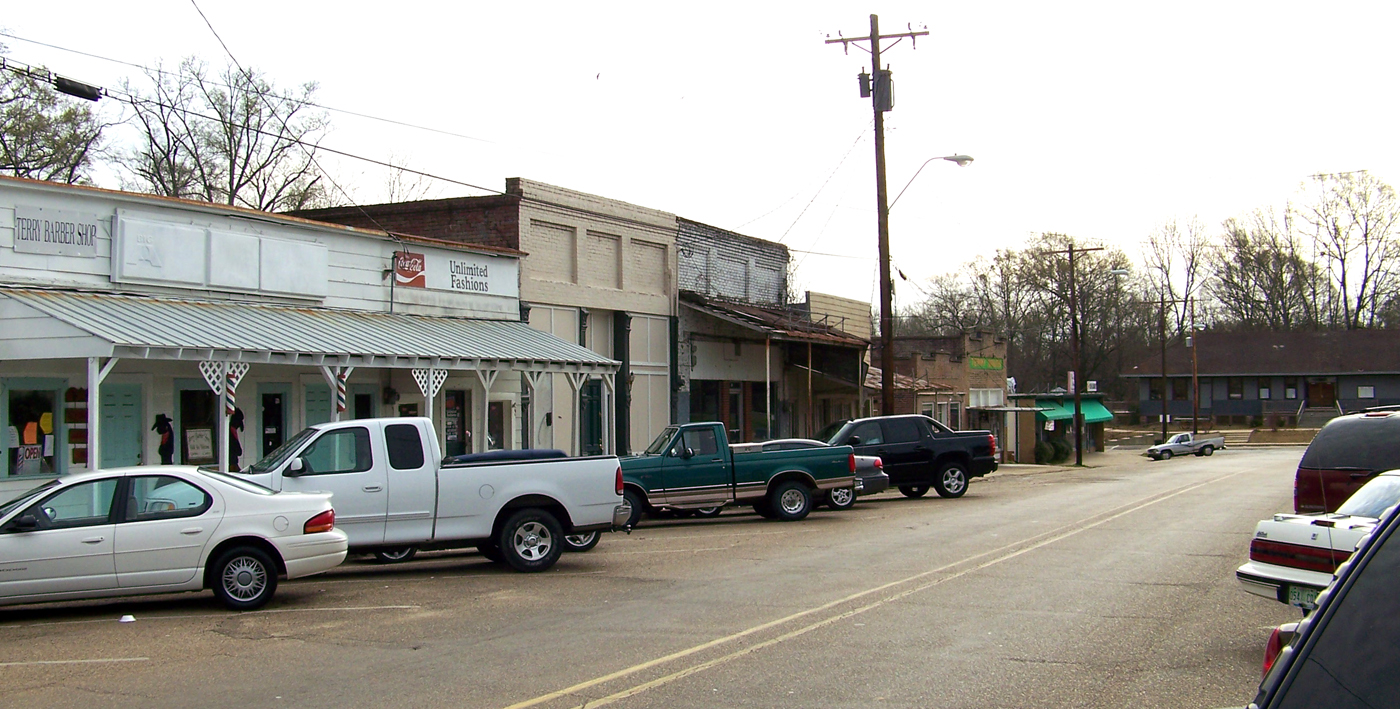
- Downtown Terry

- Location of Terry, Mississippi
- Coordinates: 32°07′10″N 90°17′40″W
- Country: United States
- State: Mississippi
- County: Hinds

Area
  - Total: 3.83 sq mi (9.93 km^{2})
  - Land: 3.81 sq mi (9.88 km^{2})
  - Water: 0.019 sq mi (0.05 km^{2})
- Elevation: 295 ft (90 m)

Population (2020)
  - Total: 1,304
  - Density: 342.0/sq mi (132.03/km^{2})
- Time zone: UTC-6 (Central (CST))
  - Summer (DST): UTC-5 (CDT)
- ZIP code: 39170
- Area code: 601
- FIPS code: 28-72680
- GNIS feature ID: 2406727
- Website: terryms.org

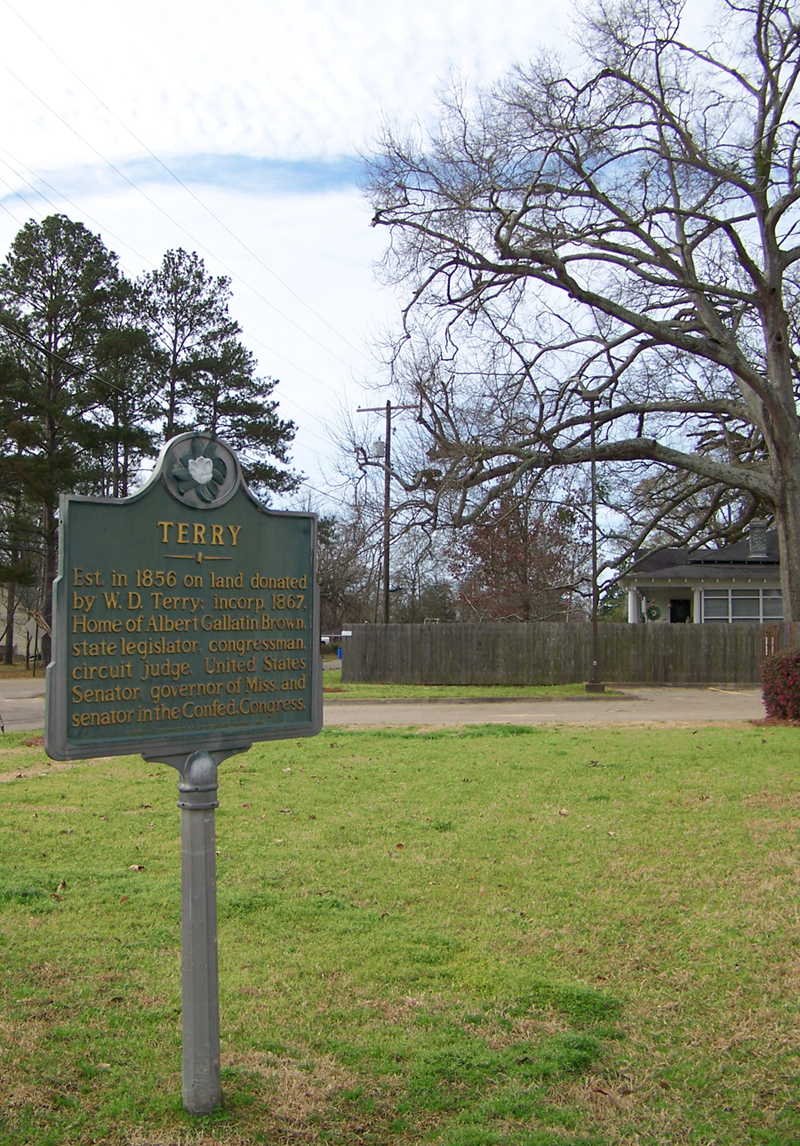
Historical marker in downtown Terry

Terry is a town in Hinds County, Mississippi, United States. As of the 2020 census, Terry had a population of 1,304. It is located along Interstate 55, about 15 miles (24 km) southwest of Jackson and located in Supervisors District Five of Hinds County. The town is part of the Jackson Metropolitan Statistical Area.

== History ==
The town of Terry, originally known as Dry Grove, changed its name in honor of William D. Terry, whose land the town was built on. This information comes from the bronze plaque in the town's center at Utica and Cunningham streets. The area was established in 1811 by settlers from Virginia. In 1867, the town of Terry was established as a depot when the railroad was built through the area. The town's community burying ground, Terry Cemetery, lies just west of town near Interstate 55. Terry donated sites for churches, a school, and a cemetery, and that he was buried there on July 13, 1882, with other members of the Terry family. Published gravestone transcriptions record burials from the mid-19th century onward. A separate, older family burying ground known as the William S. Terry Family Cemetery, recorded near County Line Church with a first known grave in 1834, was reported as no longer extant by 2005; later generations of that family were buried in the town cemetery.

For a number of years, Terry was the home of Mississippi governor Albert G. Brown.

== Geography ==
Terry is in southeastern Hinds County and is bordered to the north by the city of Byram. Interstate 55 passes through the west side of the town, with access from Exit 78. I-55 leads north 16 miles (26 km) to Jackson and south 9 miles (14 km) to Crystal Springs.

According to the United States Census Bureau, the town of Terry has a total area of 3.8 square miles (9.9 km^{2}), of which 0.02 square miles (0.05 km^{2}), or 0.50%, are water. The town is drained to the east by Rhodes Creek and Vaughn Creek, tributaries of the Pearl River.

== Demographics ==
Historical population
Census	Pop.	Note	%±
1880	198		—
1900	481		—
1910	473		−1.7%
1920	392		−17.1%
1930	412		5.1%
1940	401		−2.7%
1950	497		23.9%
1960	585		17.7%
1970	546		−6.7%
1980	655		20.0%
1990	613		−6.4%
2000	664		8.3%
2010	1,063		60.1%
2020	1,304		22.7%
U.S. Decennial Census

=== Racial and ethnic composition ===
Terry town, Mississippi – Racial and ethnic composition Note: the US Census treats Hispanic/Latino as an ethnic category. This table excludes Latinos from the racial categories and assigns them to a separate category. Hispanics/Latinos may be of any race.
Race / Ethnicity (NH = Non-Hispanic)	Pop 2000	Pop 2010	Pop 2020	% 2000	% 2010	% 2020
White alone (NH)	322	412	317	48.49%	38.76%	24.31%
Black or African American alone (NH)	335	628	951	50.45%	59.08%	72.93%
Native American or Alaska Native alone (NH)	0	2	2	0.00%	0.19%	0.15%
Asian alone (NH)	0	3	4	0.00%	0.28%	0.31%
Native Hawaiian or Pacific Islander alone (NH)	0	0	0	0.00%	0.00%	0.00%
Other race alone (NH)	0	1	0	0.00%	0.09%	0.00%
Mixed race or Multiracial (NH)	5	10	14	0.75%	0.94%	1.07%
Hispanic or Latino (any race)	2	7	16	0.30%	0.66%	1.23%
Total	664	1,063	1,304	100.00%	100.00%	100.00%

=== 2020 census ===
As of the 2020 United States census, there were 1,304 people, 449 households, and 348 families residing in the town.

=== 2010 census ===
As of the census of 2010, there were 1,063 people, 407 households, and 289 families residing in the town. The population density was 287.4 inhabitants per square mile (111.0/km^{2}). There were 288 housing units at an average density of 124.7 per square mile (48.1/km^{2}). The racial makeup of the town was 59.30% African American,38.90% White, and 0.9% from two or more races. Hispanic or Latino of any race were 0.70% of the population.

There were 407 households, out of which 37.6% had children under the age of 18 living with them, 41.5% were married couples living together, 25.1% had a female householder with no husband present, and 29.0% were non-families. 26.0% of all households were made up of individuals, and 3.2% had someone living alone who was 65 years of age or older. The average household size was 2.61 and the average family size was 3.15.

In the town, the population was spread out, with 31.6% under the age of 18, 5.0% from 18 to 24, 27.6% from 25 to 44, 25.9% from 45 to 64, and 9.9% who were 65 years of age or older. The median age was 34.6 years. For every 100 females there were 79.9 males. For every 100 females age 18 and over, there were 69.2 males.

The median income for a household in the town was $30,192, and the median income for a family was $35,875. Males had a median income of $25,781 versus $24,167 for females. The per capita income for the town was $19,011. About 17.0% of families and 16.2% of the population were below the poverty line, including 19.6% of those under age 18 and 18.5% of those age 65 or over.

== Education ==
Terry is served by the Hinds County School District and is home to Terry High School. In addition to Terry High, residents are zoned to Gary Road Elementary School, Gary Road Intermediate School, and Byram Middle School in Byram.

Jackson/Hinds Library System operates the Ella Bess Austin Library in Terry.

== Media ==
Throughout the twentieth century, the town's weekly newspaper was The Terry Headlight. The Headlight was edited in Terry and printed in Crystal Springs in the office of the Crystal Springs Meteor. The Terry Headlight ceased its publication approximately in 1990.

At the time of the demise of The Terry Headlight, the editor of the Hinds County Gazette announced that an insert devoted to the town of Terry would be included in the Gazette. This insert was published for a few weeks, at which time a column about the Terry area was incorporated into the Gazette (as was being included about other towns in Hinds County).

In late 2013, The Hinds County Gazette suspended publication. At this time, The Terry Headlight was revived as a weekly online source of information. E-mail subscriptions to this were (and remain) free to readers who request a subscription.

In 2014, The Hinds County Gazette was purchased by The Magnolia Gazette of Pike County. The weekly Terry column continues in The Hinds County Gazette.

== Notable people ==
- Henry L. Brown, physician and World War I veteran
- Bobby DeLaughter, former member of the Mississippi Supreme Court
- Tommy Johnson, Delta blues musician
- Luster Willis, artist
