= Raymond, Mississippi =

City in Mississippi, United States

- City
- City of Raymond
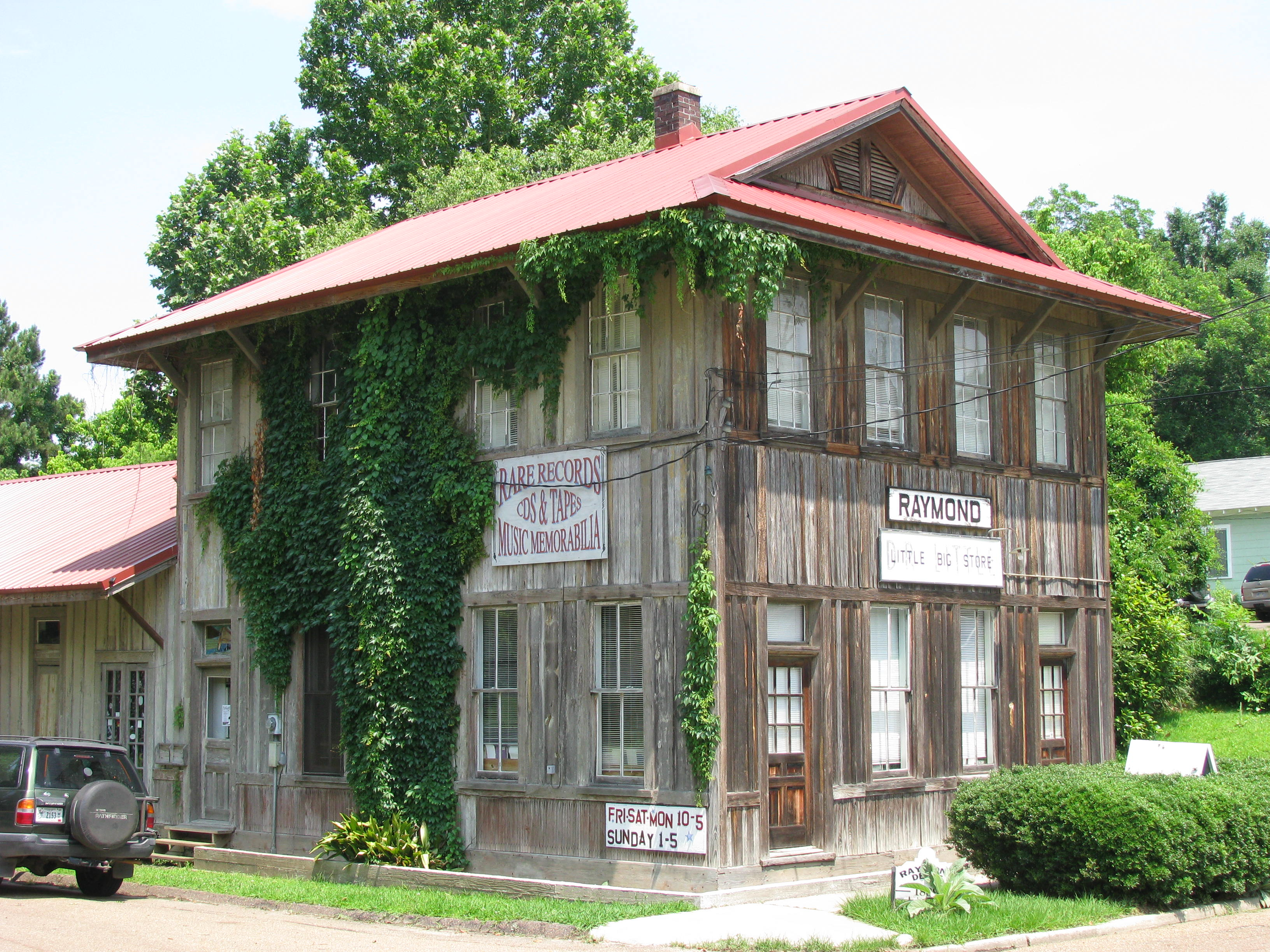
- Little Big Store in Raymond

- Wordmark

- Location of Raymond, Mississippi

- Location in the United States
- Coordinates: 32°15′20″N 90°24′38″W
- Country: United States
- State: Mississippi
- County: Hinds

Area
  - Total: 2.88 sq mi (7.46 km^{2})
  - Land: 2.88 sq mi (7.46 km^{2})
  - Water: 0 sq mi (0.00 km^{2})
- Elevation: 266 ft (81 m)

Population (2020)
  - Total: 1,960
  - Density: 680.4/sq mi (262.69/km^{2})
- Time zone: UTC-6 (Central (CST))
  - Summer (DST): UTC-5 (CDT)
- ZIP code: 39154
- Area code: 601/769
- FIPS code: 28-61160
- GNIS feature ID: 2404596
- Website: www.raymondms.com

Raymond is a city in and one of two county seats (along with Jackson) of Hinds County, Mississippi, United States, and the home of the main campus of Hinds Community College. As of the 2010 census, the city population was 1,933; in 2020, its population was 1,960. Raymond is part of the Jackson metropolitan statistical area.

== History ==
In 1829, three commissioners, including John B. Peyton, were appointed by U.S. President Andrew Jackson to find a place near the center of Hinds County for the county seat. The current location of Raymond is a ridge about a mile from the center of the county, and was selected because the actual center was low and subject to flooding. The town of Raymond received its charter from the Mississippi legislature on December 15, 1830. Because of its status as a seat of justice and its proximity to the Natchez Trace, Raymond developed quickly into a prosperous small town whose prosperity and small size have continued to this day.

In the late 1840s, Cooper's Well, a property near Raymond with a well that provided sulphured water, was developed into a resort for those seeking the perceived health benefits from its ingestion.

Construction of a new county courthouse was begun at the center of the town square in 1857 and completed in 1859; the work was largely done by enslaved African Americans. The courthouse is still in use as a secondary location of county legal matters (the city of Jackson having become the primary county seat). The Raymond courthouse is "...a prime example of Greek Revival style".

The Battle of Raymond was fought by Confederate and Union soldiers near Raymond on May 12, 1863 as part of General Ulysses S. Grant's Vicksburg Campaign during the Civil War. Four days later, the pivotal Battle of Champion Hill was won by Grant's troops and sealed the fate of Vicksburg. Grant stayed at Waverly, the plantation of John B. Peyton, and Union soldiers used St. Mark's Episcopal Church as a hospital. Blood stains can still be seen on the church's floor from that period.

Construction of a water tower was begun in 1903 in the center of the town square. It and the courthouse are landmarks for the town. A small agricultural high school was opened in 1917; it developed as Hinds Community College, which has several sites and the largest student body of any college in the state.

== Geography ==
According to the United States Census Bureau, the city has a total area of 3.0 square miles (7.8 km^{2}), all land.

== Demographics ==
Historical population
Census	Pop.	Note	%±
1880	488		—
1900	483		—
1910	579		19.9%
1920	500		−13.6%
1930	547		9.4%
1940	641		17.2%
1950	1,259		96.4%
1960	1,381		9.7%
1970	1,620		17.3%
1980	1,967		21.4%
1990	2,275		15.7%
2000	1,664		−26.9%
2010	1,933		16.2%
2020	1,960		1.4%
U.S. Decennial Census; 2013 Estimate

=== 2020 census ===
As of the 2020 census, Raymond had a population of 1,960. The median age was 20.4 years. 9.0% of residents were under the age of 18 and 11.7% of residents were 65 years of age or older. For every 100 females there were 90.5 males, and for every 100 females age 18 and over there were 91.2 males age 18 and over.

0.0% of residents lived in urban areas, while 100.0% lived in rural areas.

There were 452 households in Raymond, of which 26.5% had children under the age of 18 living in them. Of all households, 33.4% were married-couple households, 23.5% were households with a male householder and no spouse or partner present, and 39.4% were households with a female householder and no spouse or partner present. About 40.2% of all households were made up of individuals and 17.3% had someone living alone who was 65 years of age or older.

There were 473 housing units, of which 4.4% were vacant. The homeowner vacancy rate was 0.8% and the rental vacancy rate was 2.6%.

Raymond racial composition as of 2020
Race	Num.	Perc.
White (non-Hispanic)	764	38.98%
Black or African American (non-Hispanic)	1,124	57.35%
Native American	2	0.1%
Asian	4	0.2%
Pacific Islander	2	0.1%
Other/Mixed	35	1.79%
Hispanic or Latino	29	1.48%

== Government and infrastructure ==
The United States Postal Service operates the Raymond Post Office.

The Mississippi Department of Human Services operates the Oakley Training School in unincorporated Hinds County, near Raymond.

== Education ==
Hinds Community College has a Raymond campus.

Residents are within the Hinds County School District, and are zoned to Raymond Elementary School, Carver Middle School, and Raymond High School.

Jackson Hinds Library System operates the Raymond Public Library at the Hinds Courthouse annex.

== Notable people ==
- Willie Banks, gospel music singer
- Cory Carter, American football punter
- Stephen Head, Major League Baseball scout
- George Caldwell Granberry, former state legislator who served as postmaster of Raymond
- Rick Lawson, gospel music singer
- Muna Lee, Pan-American poet and first wife of Luis Muñoz Marín.
- Kansas Joe McCoy, Delta blues singer
- D. P. Porter, 25th Secretary of State of Mississippi
- Susan Dabney Smedes, teacher and author
- Jeremy Williams, American player of Canadian football
- John Bell Williams, governor of Mississippi from 1968 to 1972, was born in Raymond.
- Earl Franklin Leggett, played and coached in the National Football League for 35 years. (March 5, 1933 – May 15, 2008) was an American professional football defensive lineman in the National Football League (NFL) for the Chicago Bears, Los Angeles Rams, and New Orleans Saints. He played college football at Louisiana State University (LSU). He was an assistant coach for various teams.[1]

Earl Leggett

== Gallery ==
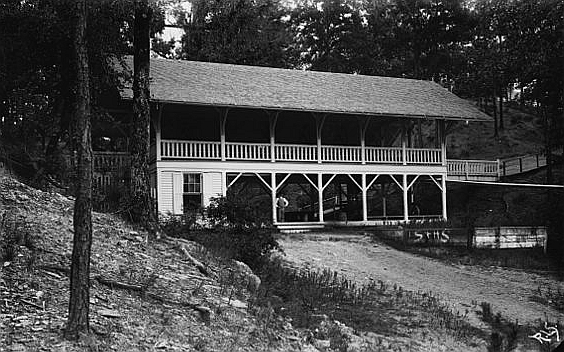
Cooper's Well, c. 1900

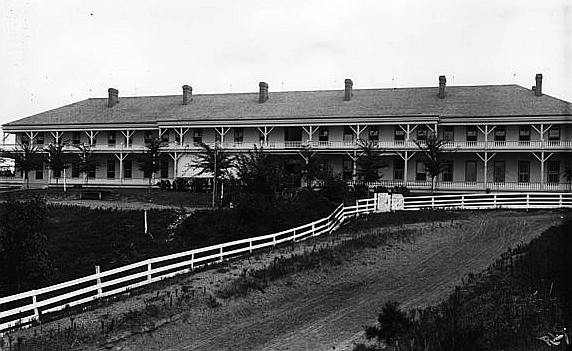
Cooper's Well Resort, c. 1900

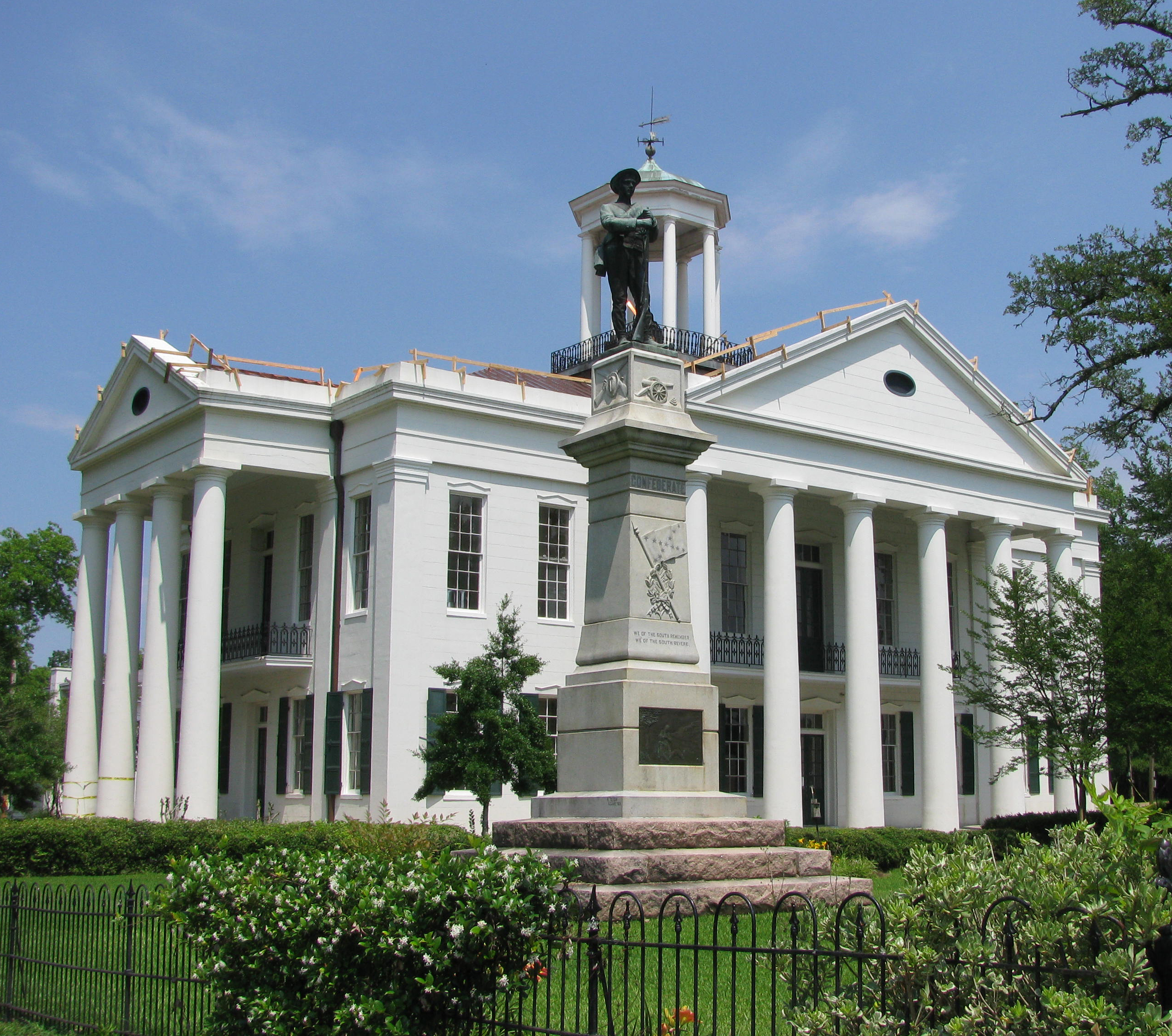
Raymond Courthouse

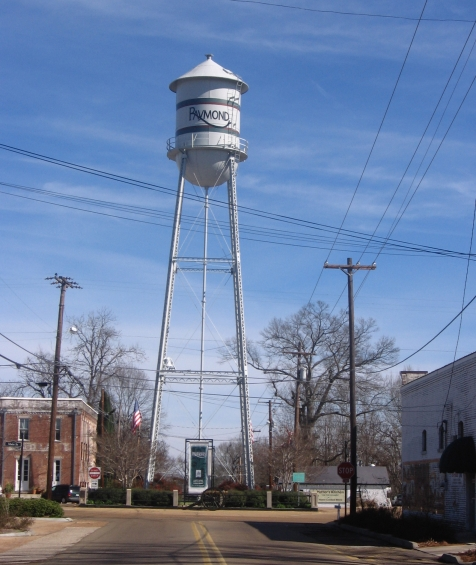
Raymond water tower

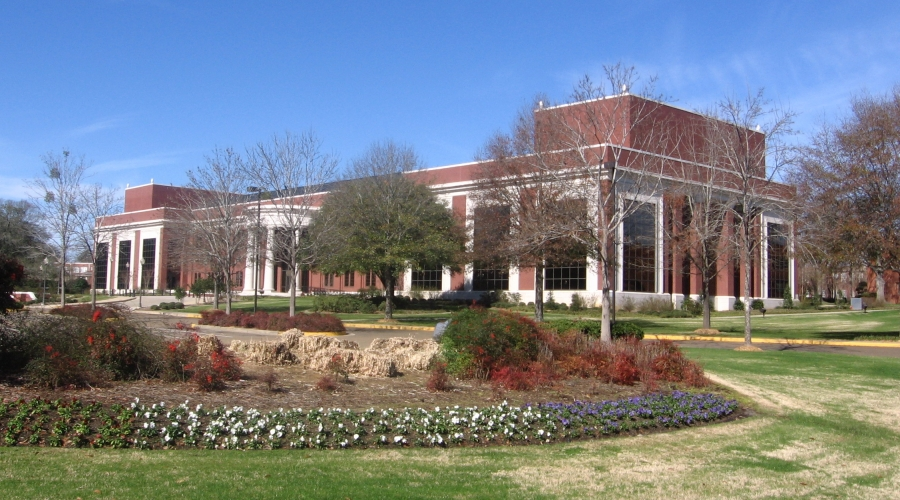
Cain Cochran Hall on the Raymond Campus of Hinds Community College
