= Frank P. Gates =

American architect

Frank Perry Gates
- Born: 1895; Memphis, Tennessee, U.S.
- Died: January 2, 1975 (aged 79–80); Jackson, Mississippi, U.S.
- Resting place: Forest Hill Cemetery; Memphis, Tennessee, U.S.
- Education: Chicago Technology Academy
- Occupation: Architect
- Spouse: Ruby Nichols (m. 1951)

Frank Perry Gates (1895 – January 2, 1975) was an American architect. He designed buildings in Mississippi, especially in Clarksdale and Jackson, some of which are listed on the National Register of Historic Places. He also designed 18 buildings on the campus of the University of Mississippi.

== Early life ==
Frank Perry Gates was born in 1895 in Memphis, Tennessee. He had a brother and two sisters. He was educated at the Chicago Technology Academy. He moved to Clarksdale, Mississippi in 1917 and served in the United States Army during World War I.

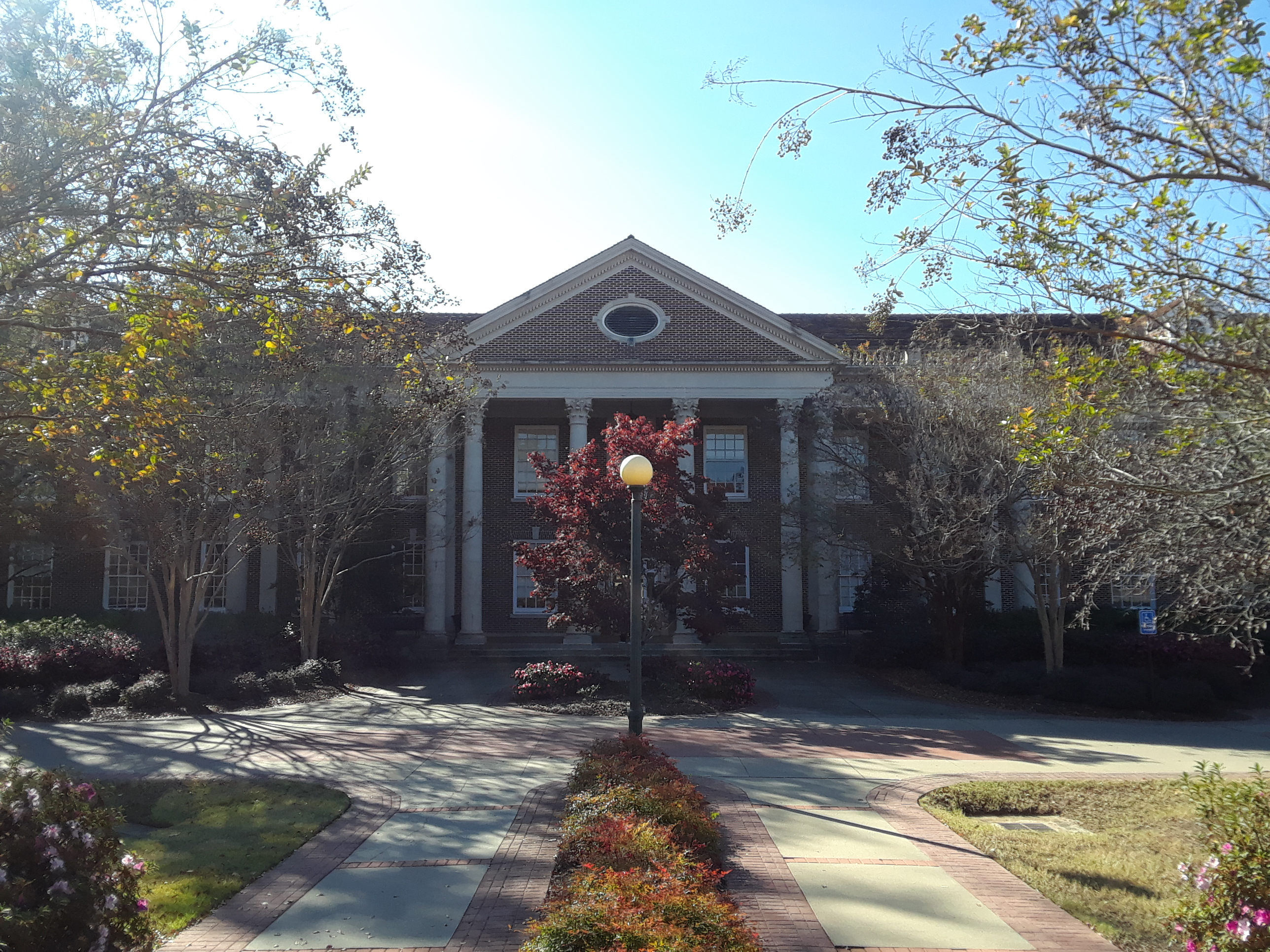
Bondurant Hall on the campus of the University of Mississippi, designed by Gates

== Career ==
Gates began his career as an architect in Clarksdale, where he designed the Elizabeth G. Dorr (Junior) High School, the (Old) American Legion Hall, and the Gates & Gates Veterinary Hospital, which is listed on the National Register of Historic Places as a contributing property to the Clarksdale Historic District. By the 1930s, he had opened a new architectural practice in Jackson, Mississippi. While he designed most of his buildings on his own, he also worked with architect Raymond Birchett.

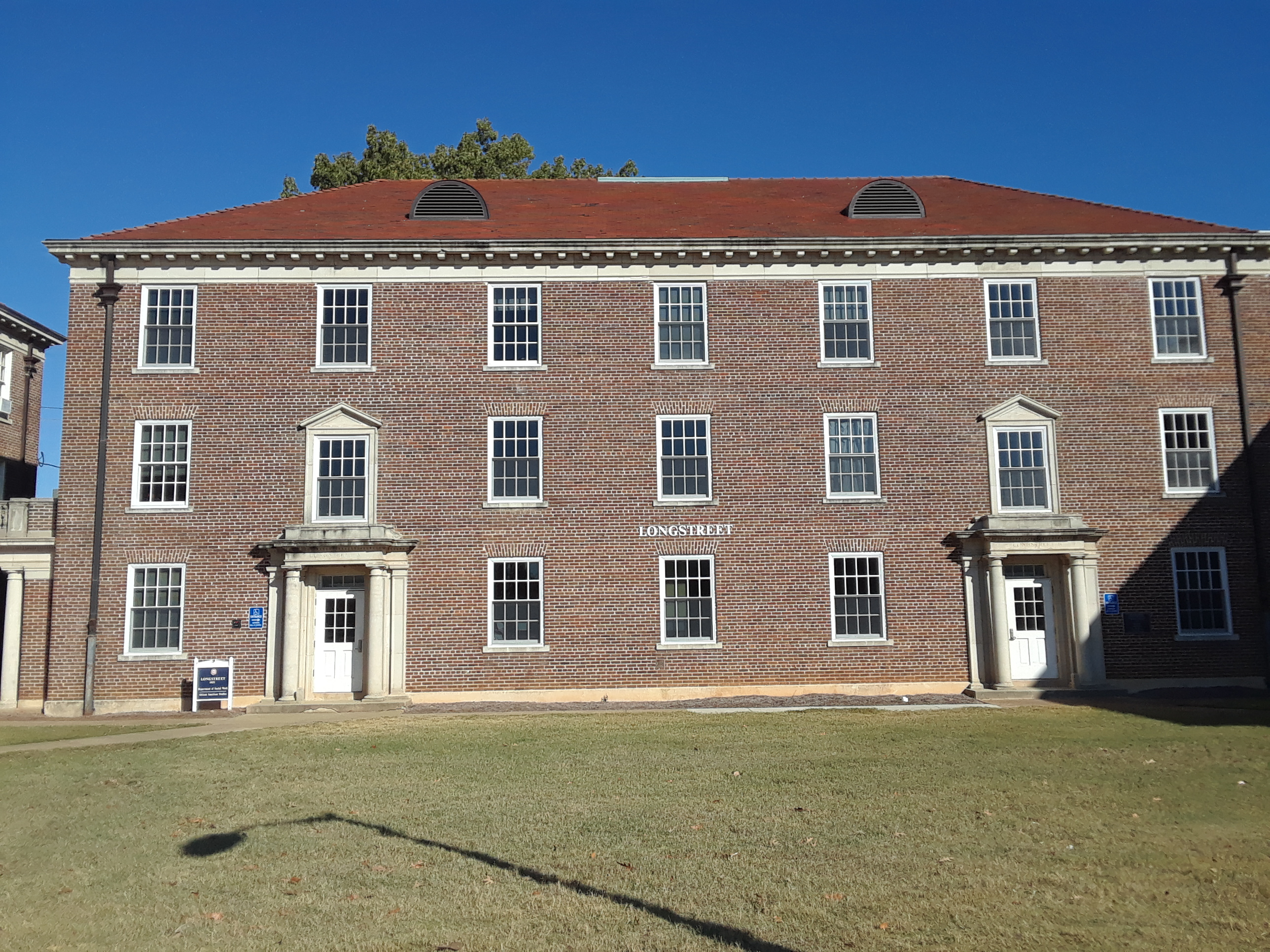
Longstreet Hall on the campus of the University of Mississippi, designed by Gates

Gates designed 18 buildings on the campus of the University of Mississippi, mostly in the Georgian Revival architectural style; they include (Old) University High School, Barr Hall, Bondurant Hall, Farley Hall (also known as Lamar Hall), Faulkner Hall, Hill Hall, Howry Hall, Isom Hall, Longstreet Hall, Martindale Hall, Vardaman Hall, the Cafeteria/Union Building, and the Wesley Knight Field House. He also designed buildings on the campuses of two historically black colleges: the Just Hall Of Science at Jackson State University and Mable Thomas Hall at Alcorn State University.

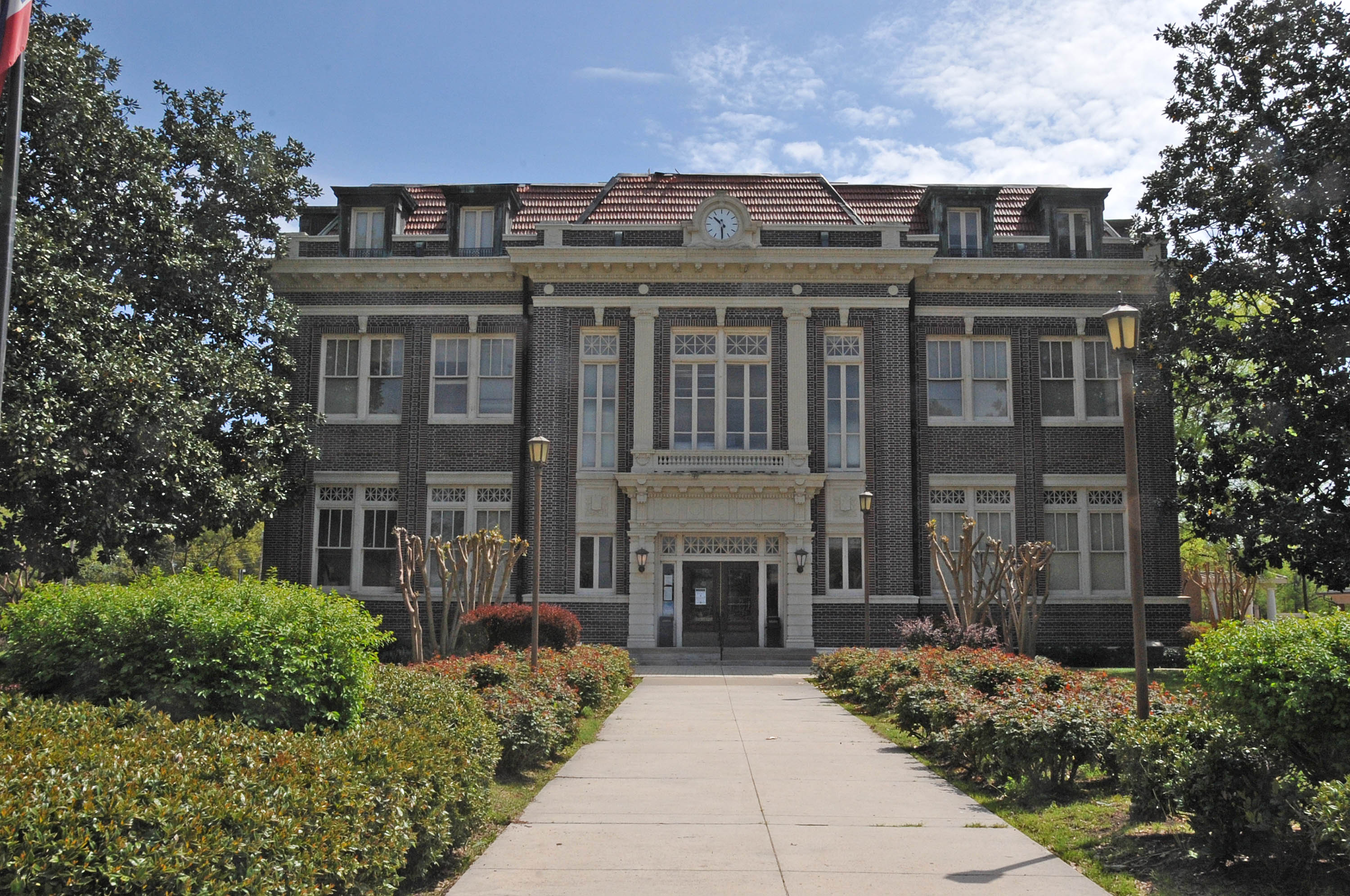
The Tunica County Courthouse, designed by Gates

Gates designed the Jackson Exchange Boys Club, the Jackson Police Department, and the Jackson Jail and Municipal Court. Additionally, he renovated the Jackson City Hall in 1963–1964. He also designed the Tunica County Courthouse in Tunica, Mississippi in the Classical Revival architectural style; it is listed on the National Register of Historic Places as part of the Tunica Historic District.

With architects Emmett J. Hull, Edgar Lucian Malvaney and Ransom Carey Jones, Gates designed Woolfolk State Office Building in Jackson in 1949.

Gates was a co-founder of the Mississippi Association of Architects. He was also elected as the president of the Mississippi chapter of the American Institute of Architects in 1937.

== Personal life and death ==
Gates married Ruby Nichols in 1951. They resided at 4911 Old Canton Road in Jackson, Mississippi. He was a member of the First Presbyterian Church in Jackson and the American Legion. He was the "grand winner of the 1949 floral exhibits at the Mississippi State Fair."

Gates died on January 2, 1975, in Jackson, and he was buried at Forest Hill Cemetery in Memphis.
