= Faser =

Faser may refer to:

- FASER experiment, a planned particle physics experiment at the Large Hadron Collider at CERN
- Henry Minor Faser (1882–1960), American academic administrator, business executive, and political activist
