= Woolfolk State Office Building =

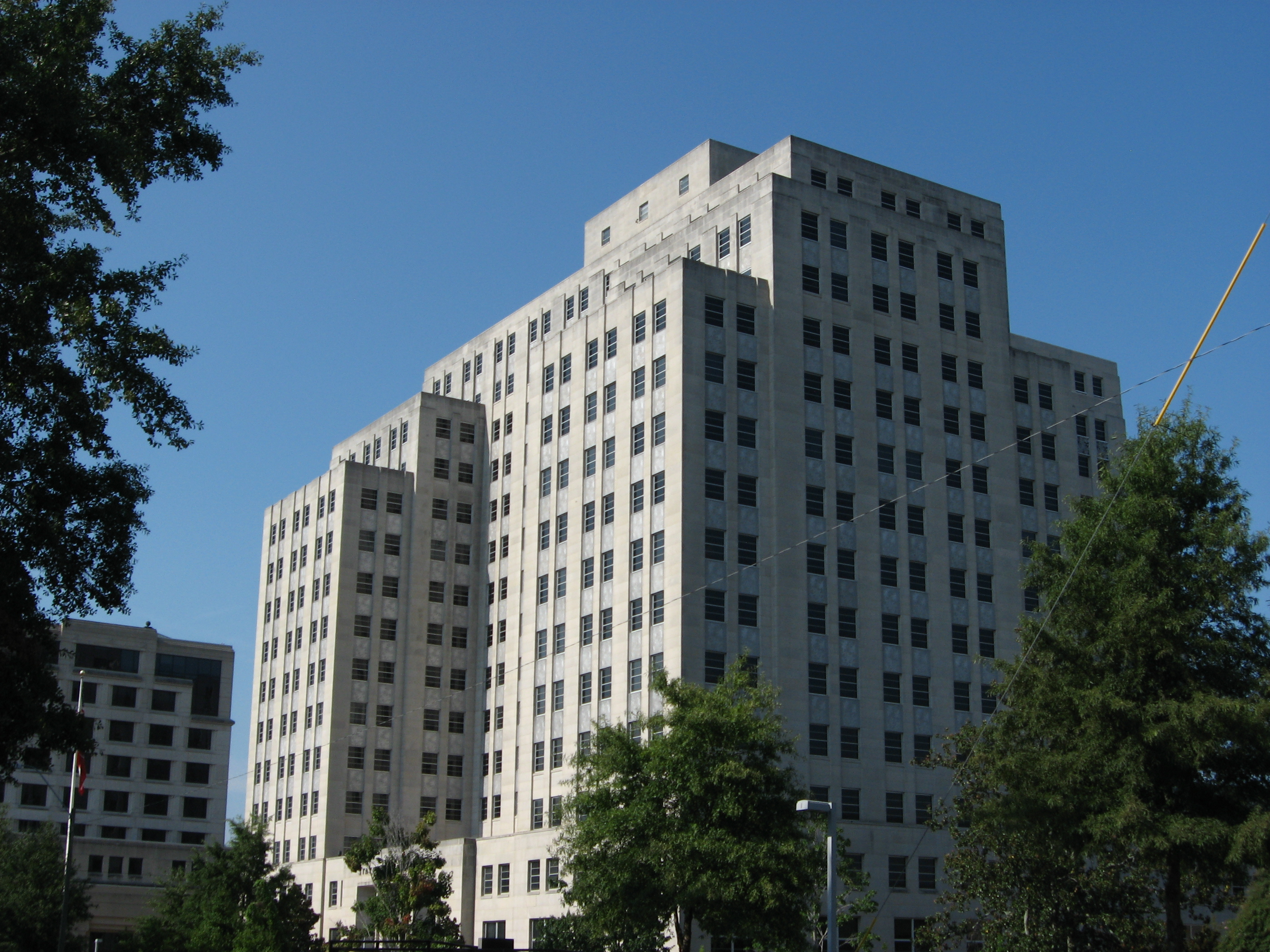

- Location in Mississippi Woolfolk State Office Building (the United States)

General information
- Status: Completed
- Type: Government
- Location: 501 North West Street, Jackson, Mississippi, USA
- Coordinates: 32.3042°N 90.18399°W
- Completed: 1949

Technical details
- Floor count: 16

Design and construction
- Architects: Emmett J. Hull; Edgar Lucian Malvaney; Frank P. Gates; Ransom Carey Jones

The Woolfolk State Office Building is a high-rise government office building in Jackson, Mississippi, USA. It was designed in the Art Deco architectural style by Emmett J. Hull, Edgar Lucian Malvaney, Frank P. Gates and Ransom Carey Jones, and it was completed in 1949. It is currently the tenth-tallest building in Jackson. The building is named for Ellis Trigg Woolfolk, who served in the Mississippi legislature in the 1920s and 1930s.
