= Frank Gates =

Frank Gates may refer to:

- Frank Gates (basketball) (1920–1978), American basketball player
- Frank E. Gates (1863–1952), American scenic designer
- Frank P. Gates (1895–1975), American architect
