= Chicago and Southern Air Lines Flight 4 =

1936 aircraft crash in Missouri, US

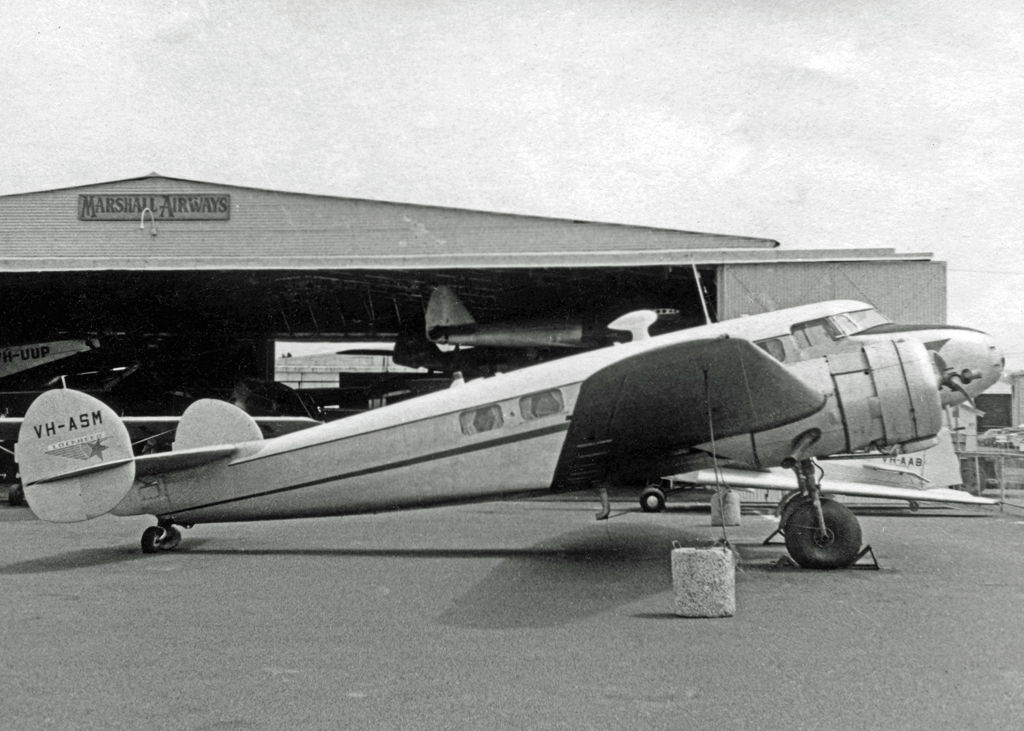
- A Lockheed 10B similar to the one in the accident

Accident
- Date: August 5, 1936
- Summary: Controlled flight into terrain due to pilot error
- Site: St. Louis, Missouri, United States; 38°48′27.44″N 90°22′15.40″W

Aircraft
- Aircraft type: Lockheed Model 10B Electra
- Aircraft name: City of Memphis
- Operator: Chicago and Southern Air Lines
- Registration: NC16022
- Flight origin: Lambert St. Louis Airport, St. Louis, United States
- Destination: Midway Airport, Chicago, Illinois
- Passengers: 6
- Crew: 2
- Fatalities: 8
- Survivors: 0

Chicago and Southern Air Lines Flight 4 was a regularly scheduled flight from New Orleans, Louisiana to Chicago, Illinois via Jackson, Mississippi; Memphis, Tennessee; and St. Louis, Missouri operated with a Lockheed Model 10 Electra. On August 5, 1936, after departing from Lambert-St. Louis International Airport, the flight crashed in a farm field near the Missouri River. All six passengers and two crew members were killed in the crash. Vernon Omlie — who had performed as a noted barnstorming team with his wife, the aviation pioneer Phoebe Omlie — was among the dead.

== Accident ==
The Lockheed Electra, named City of Memphis, was on a flight from New Orleans to Chicago. After having left New Orleans at 5:30 PM, it proceeded normally to Jackson; Memphis; and St. Louis. It departed St. Louis at 9:52 PM, and was scheduled to arrive in Chicago at 12:55 AM.

The aircraft departed St. Louis and proceeded on a northerly track towards the Missouri River. Five minutes after departure, all radio contact was lost with the aircraft. Chicago and Southern’s company radio controller made repeated attempts to contact the flight, and then notified the Chicago station, informing them of the missing aircraft.

“The accident is believed to have occurred 10 minutes later, indicated by the wrist watch of the dead pilot which stopped at 10:02.”

“The ship was unheard from after its takeoff, but airline officials were not concerned until they received a report from Tom King, a farmer, that he had heard motors of a plane die in midair. The wreckage was discovered hours later by a search party from the airport.

“Ralph L. Sharp, of Fairfield, Ill., visiting friends near the scene, said he saw the plane flying low and then bank sharply to the left as though the pilot, encountering bad visibility, had decided to return to the airport.”

“Ben Knobbe, a farmer, said the approach of the plane frightened him as it passed over his home.

”’I had come into the barn for a minute,’ he said, ‘when I heard the motors of the plane roaring wide open. I came out into the yard and saw the plane coming toward the barn.’

”’It flew so low that it grazed a tall tree. I was afraid it was going to strike the barn. A few minutes later the motors stopped. I went out and looked toward the north. I couldn’t see anything.’”

“With the pilot apparently attempting to nose up, the heavy 10-passenger Lockheed-Electra [sic] transport cut a triangular swath across a cornfield before it turned over. Wreckage and bodies were strewn over a radius of 50 feet [15 meters]. A part of the motor dropped out and the left wing was thrown to one side. All but one of the occupants were hurled out of the fuselage and the seats went with them.”

“Aviators said the ship was traveling approximately 180 miles per hour [290 km/h] when it crashed.”

Farmers in the vicinity of the aircraft’s last radio contact were contacted, and began a search for the aircraft, believing an accident had occurred. Within several hours the aircraft was located, in a farm field near the Missouri River, 16 miles (26 km) north of St. Louis. Seven of the plane’s eight occupants were found within 50 feet (15 m) of the wreckage; the remaining passenger was found still in the cabin. All of the victims showed signs of massive impact trauma, and were believed to have been killed instantly.

The weather in the area had been reported as clear, except for in the vicinity of the river, where heavy ground fog was present. Preliminary reports believed the ground fog to have been a factor.

Upon examination of the wreckage, it was found that the plane had, for unknown reasons, been in a low turn near the ground, and the wingtip made contact with the terrain, causing the aircraft to strike the ground. The reason for the low-altitude turn was unknown.

“A preliminary investigation by A. S. Koch, Federal aeronautical inspector, indicated the crash was caused by fog. Major R. W. Schroder, chief of the airway inspection service of the department of commerce, arrived here tonight to assume charge of the inquiry.

“‘So far we have not found any evidence of mechanical failure,’ Koch said. ‘The indications are the pilot ran into trouble as a result of a thick ground fog soon after leaving the airport and crashed while attempting the circle back to the field.’”
