= Marie Hull =

American painter

- Born: Emily Marie Atkinson; September 28, 1890; Summit, Pike County, Mississippi, U.S.
- Died: November 21, 1980 (aged 90)
- Education: McComb High School; Higbee School
- Alma mater: Belhaven College; Pennsylvania Academy of the Fine Arts
- Occupation: painter
- Spouse: Emmett J. Hull
- Parent: Earnest Sidney Atkinson

Marie Hull (September 28, 1890 - November 21, 1980) was an American painter from Mississippi. Her work was exhibited in the United States and Europe. In her home state of Mississippi, October 22, 1975, was designated as Marie Hull Day. Some of her paintings are in the permanent collection of the Mississippi Museum of Art in Jackson, Mississippi.

== Early life ==
Marie Hull was born on September 28, 1890, in Summit, Mississippi. Her father was Earnest Sidney Atkinson and her mother, Mary Catherine Sample. She had three siblings. Her maternal grandfather, a graduate of the Tulane University School of Medicine, "made drawings of Civil War battles."

Hull was educated at McComb High School and the Higbee School in Memphis, Tennessee. She graduated from Belhaven College in Jackson, Mississippi with a Bachelor of Arts degree in music in 1909. After teaching piano lessons in Jackson, she took painting lessons from Aileen Philips and attended the Pennsylvania Academy of the Fine Arts in Philadelphia, Pennsylvania, where her professors included Hugh Breckenridge, Daniel Garber and William Merritt Chase. Later, she also attended the Colorado Springs Fine Arts Center, where her professors included John F. Carlson and Robert Reid and the Art Students League of New York, where she was taught by Frank DuMond. She also took painting lessons from Robert Vonnoh in Connecticut.

== Career ==
Hull taught art at Hillman College in Clinton, Mississippi from 1913 to 1914. One of her students was painter Andrew Bucci. Meanwhile, she also taught African-American schoolchildren at the College Park Clubhouse in Jackson.

Hull was a member of the Mississippi Art Association, from which she received a gold medal in 1920. Six years later, in 1926, she won the first prize in a Southern States Art League contest. Three years later, in 1929, she won the second prize at the Texas Wild Flower Painting Competition for her painting of yucca blossoms. With this prize, she covered the tuition fees of an eight-month art school in Europe with painter George Elmer Browne, during which time she "produced over six hundred oils and watercolors that reflected her travels." Over the years, she painted "birds, nature scenes, architecture, portraits, flowers" and "abstract art." Some of her paintings were commissioned by the Works Progress Administration. By the 1930s, her paintings were exhibited in San Francisco, California, New York City, and Paris, France.

Hull was the 1965 recipient of the Katherine Bellaman Prize at the Mississippi Governor's Mansion. Ten years later, Governor William Waller created "Marie Hull Day" on October 22, 1975. A month later, in September 1975, the University Press of Mississippi had published The Art of Marie Hull, a book co-authored by Malcolm M. Norwood, Virginia McGehee Elias and William S. Haynie.

== Personal life ==
She married Emmett J. Hull, an architect, on July 28, 1917. They resided at 825 Belhaven Street in Jackson, Mississippi. She was predeceased by her husband on October 20, 1957, and she moved into a retirement facility in 1977.

== Death and legacy ==
Hull died on November 21, 1980. Some of her paintings are in the permanent collection of the Mississippi Museum of Art in Jackson, Mississippi. The museum held an exhibition, entitled Bright Fields: The Mastery of Marie Hull, from September 26, 2015, to January 10, 2016. Concert pianist Bruce Levingston authored Bright Fields: The Mastery of Marie Hull, published by the University Press of Mississippi in 2015. Additionally, Mississippi Public Broadcasting made a documentary about her life as well as a program about the exhibit in 2015.
