= Forest Hill Cemetery (Memphis, Tennessee) =

Cemetery in Memphis, Tennessee

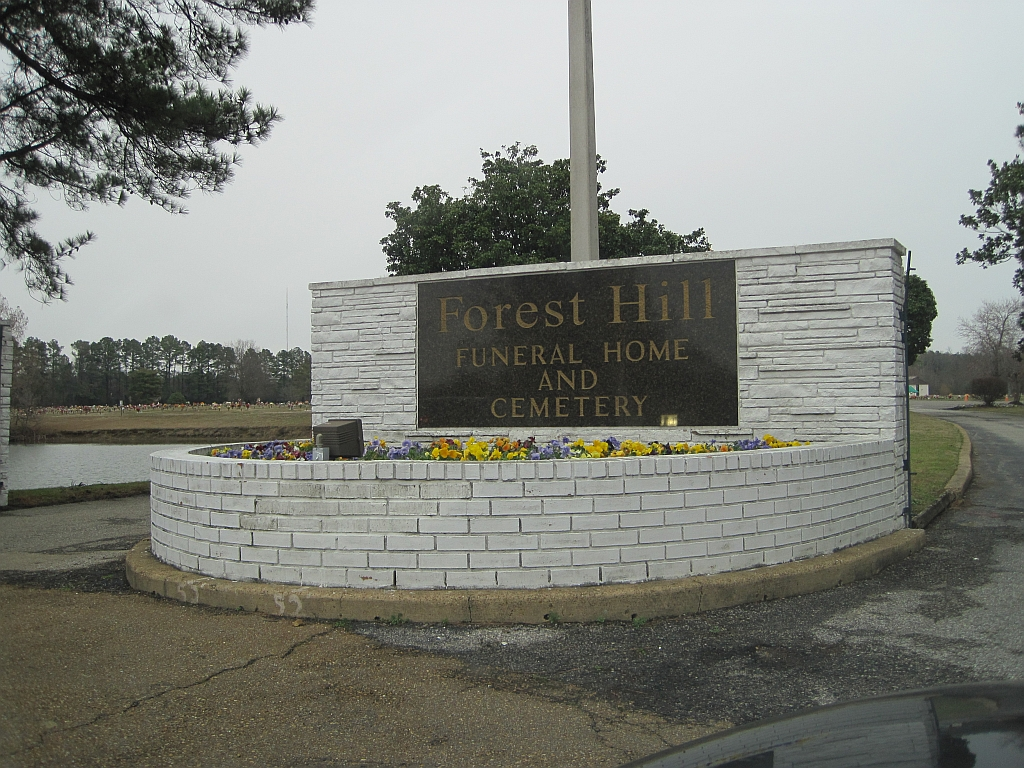
- Sign of Forest Hill Cemetery East, Whitten Road

Details
- Established: 1888
- Location: 1661 Elvis Presley Blvd. Memphis, Tennessee
- Country: United States
- Coordinates: 35.09799254°N 90.02215424°W
- Owned by: StoneMor
- Website: https://www.foresthillfh.com/
- Find a Grave: Forest Hill Cemetery

Forest Hill Cemetery is a cemetery in Memphis, Tennessee. It consists of three separate cemeteries: Forest Hill Cemetery Midtown, Forest Hill Cemetery East and Forest Hill Cemetery South.

== History ==
Forest Hill Cemetery Midtown was established in 1888 and chartered in 1892. As of 1906, the cemetery comprised 180 acres and there were 1,300 interments.

A second location, Forest Hill Cemetery East, was established in 1961. A third location, Forest Hill Cemetery South, was established in 1962. The cemeteries are owned by Pennsylvania based StoneMor.

In 2021, WREG-TV investigated fines placed in 2020 and 2021 by the state against the cemeteries. The cemeteries received complaints and ten fines for poor maintenance, management and rodent infestation. The rodent infestation problem took place at the body preparation building from June 2020 to March 2021 at the Forest Hill Cemetery East location. There has been notable damage to memorials, including the memorials of John R. Brinkley and the Elks Rest monument.

The cemetery has various monuments, including one to the Benevolent and Protective Order of Elks.

== Notable burials ==
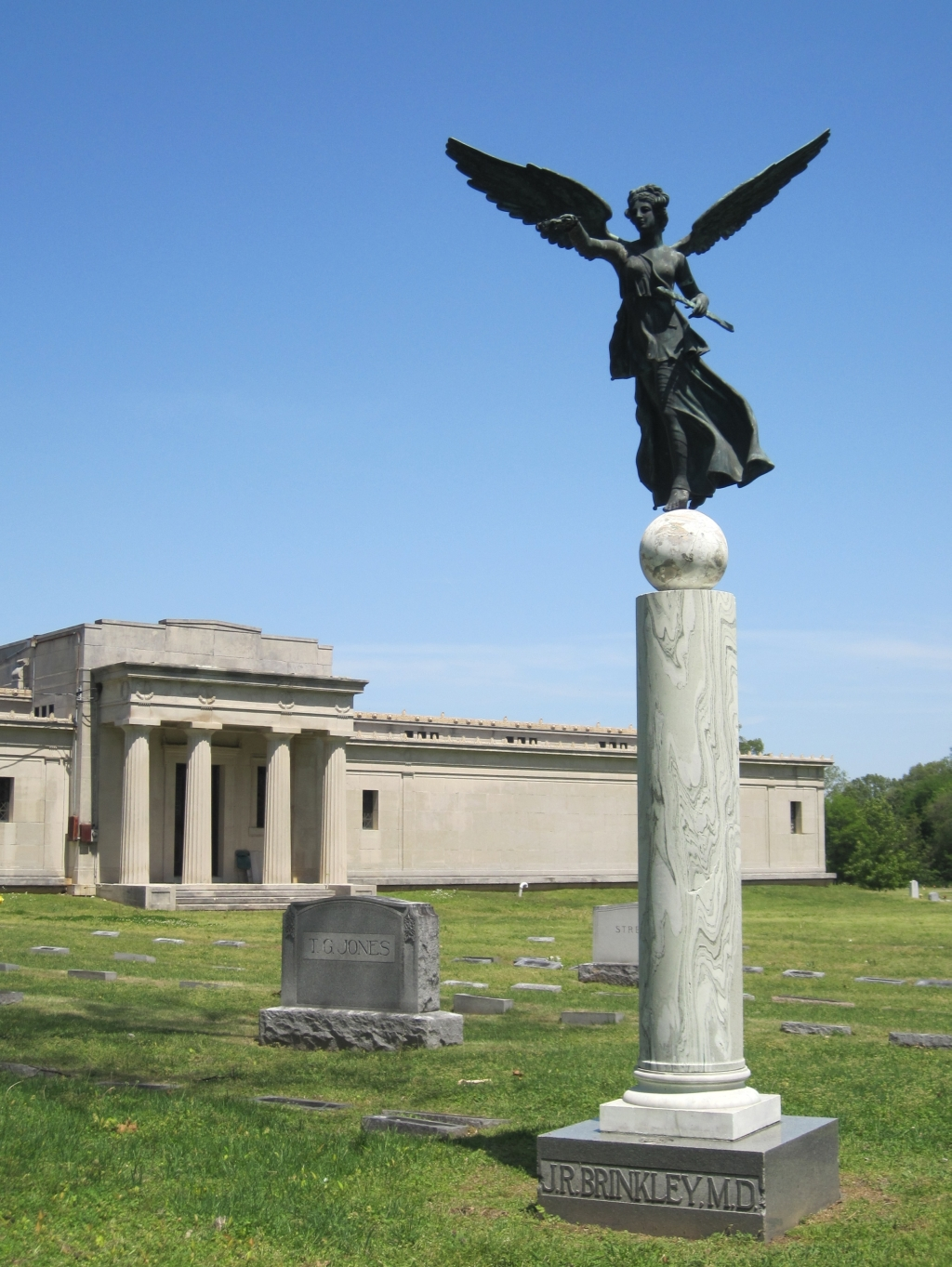
Memorial of John R. Brinkley at Forest Hill Cemetery Midtown (in 2011)

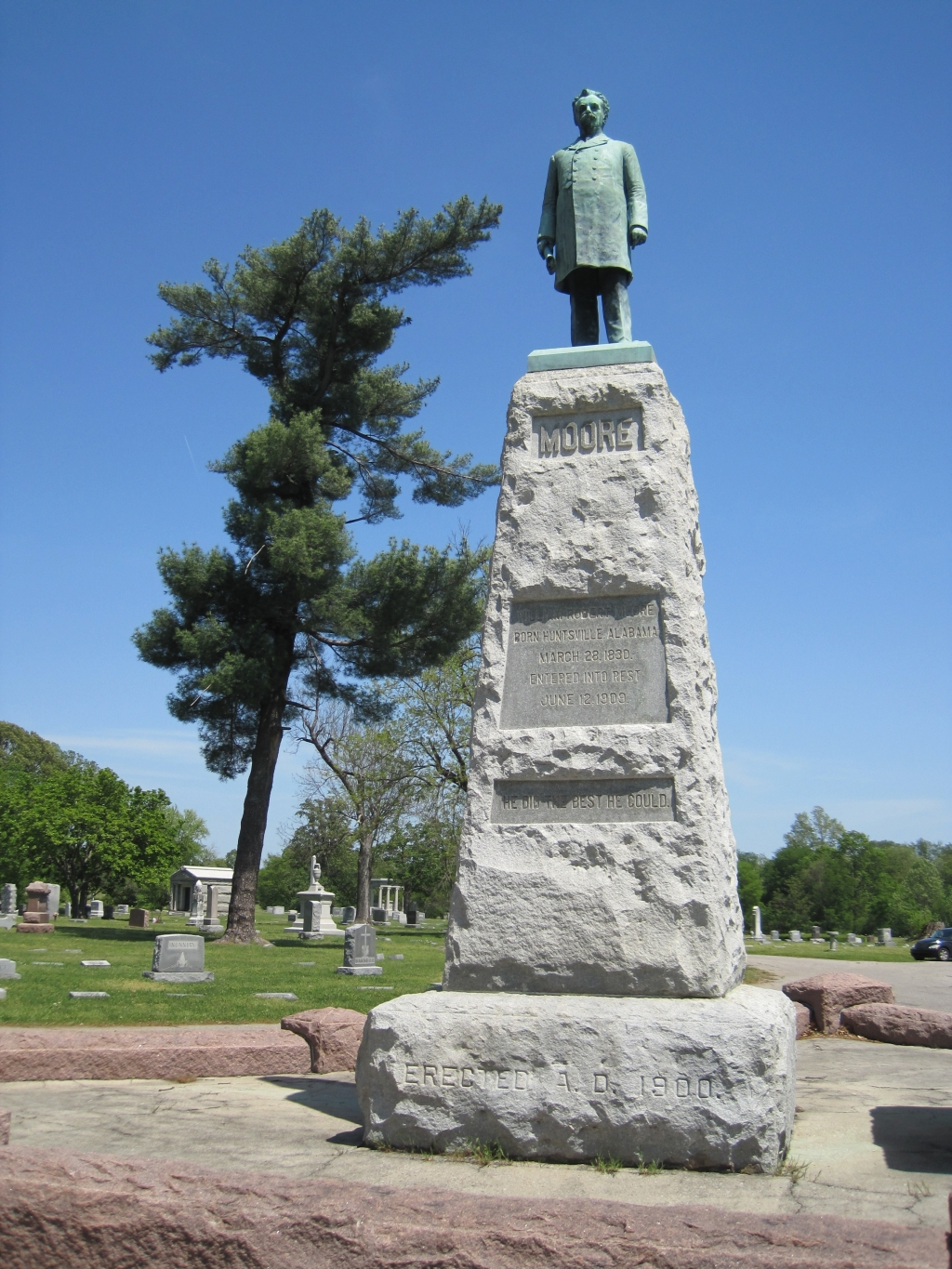
Grave of William Robert Moore at Forest Hill Cemetery Midtown

- Estelle Axton (1918–2004), record executive and co-founder of Stax Records
- Packy Axton (1941–1974), American musician
- Bill Black (1926–1965), American bassist who worked with Elvis Presley
- James Blackwood (1919–2002), American gospel singer
- John R. Brinkley (1885–1945), charlatan physician and radio pioneer
- Christopher Byers (died 1993), victim of the West Memphis Three
- Walter Chandler (1887–1967), U.S. Representative from Tennessee and mayor of Memphis
- Clifford Davis (1897–1970), U.S. Representative from Tennessee
- Charlie Feathers (1932–1998), American musician
- Frank P. Gates (1895–1975), Mississippi architect
- John E. McCall (1859–1920), U.S. Representative from Tennessee and judge
- William Robert Moore (1830–1909), U.S. Representative from Tennessee and college founder
- Phoebe Omlie (1902–1975), American aviation pioneer
- Josiah Patterson (1837–1904), officer in Confederate States Army and U.S. Representative from Tennessee
- Malcolm R. Patterson (1861–1935), U.S. Representative from Tennessee and governor of Tennessee
- Margaret Polk (1922–1990), namesake of Memphis Belle
- Elvis Presley (1935–1977), American rock and roll artist and actor (his body was moved to Graceland shortly after burial)
- Frank Trimble (1840–1915), merchant and real estate businessman
- Kemmons Wilson (1913–2003), founder of the Holiday Inn hotel chain
- Luke Edward Wright (1846–1922), Governor-General of the Philippines and U.S. Secretary of War

== See also ==
- List of cemeteries in Tennessee
