= Emmett J. Hull =

American architect

Emmett Johnson Hull
- Born: 1882; Jackson, Mississippi, U.S.
- Died: October 6, 1957 (aged 74–75); Jackson, Mississippi, U.S.
- Resting place: Wright and Ferguson Funeral Home
- Education: Cornell University
- Occupation: Architect
- Spouse: Marie Hull
- Parent(s): Francis Blair Hull; Clara Swain
- Relatives: W.S. Hull (paternal uncle)

Emmett J. Hull (September 9, 1882 - October 20, 1957) was an American architect. He designed many buildings in Mississippi, especially houses in his hometown of Jackson, many of which are listed on the National Register of Historic Places. He also designed buildings on the campuses of Copiah–Lincoln Community College, Tougaloo College, Chamberlain-Hunt Academy in Port Gibson, and Mississippi State University.

== Early life ==
Emmett J. Hull was born in 1882 in Jackson, Mississippi. His father, Francis Blair Hull, was the "owner of one of the state's largest contracting companies", while his paternal uncle, W.S. Hull, was an architect who designed several buildings in Jackson. His mother was named Clara Swain.

Hull attended Cornell University for two years, graduating in 1906.

== Career ==
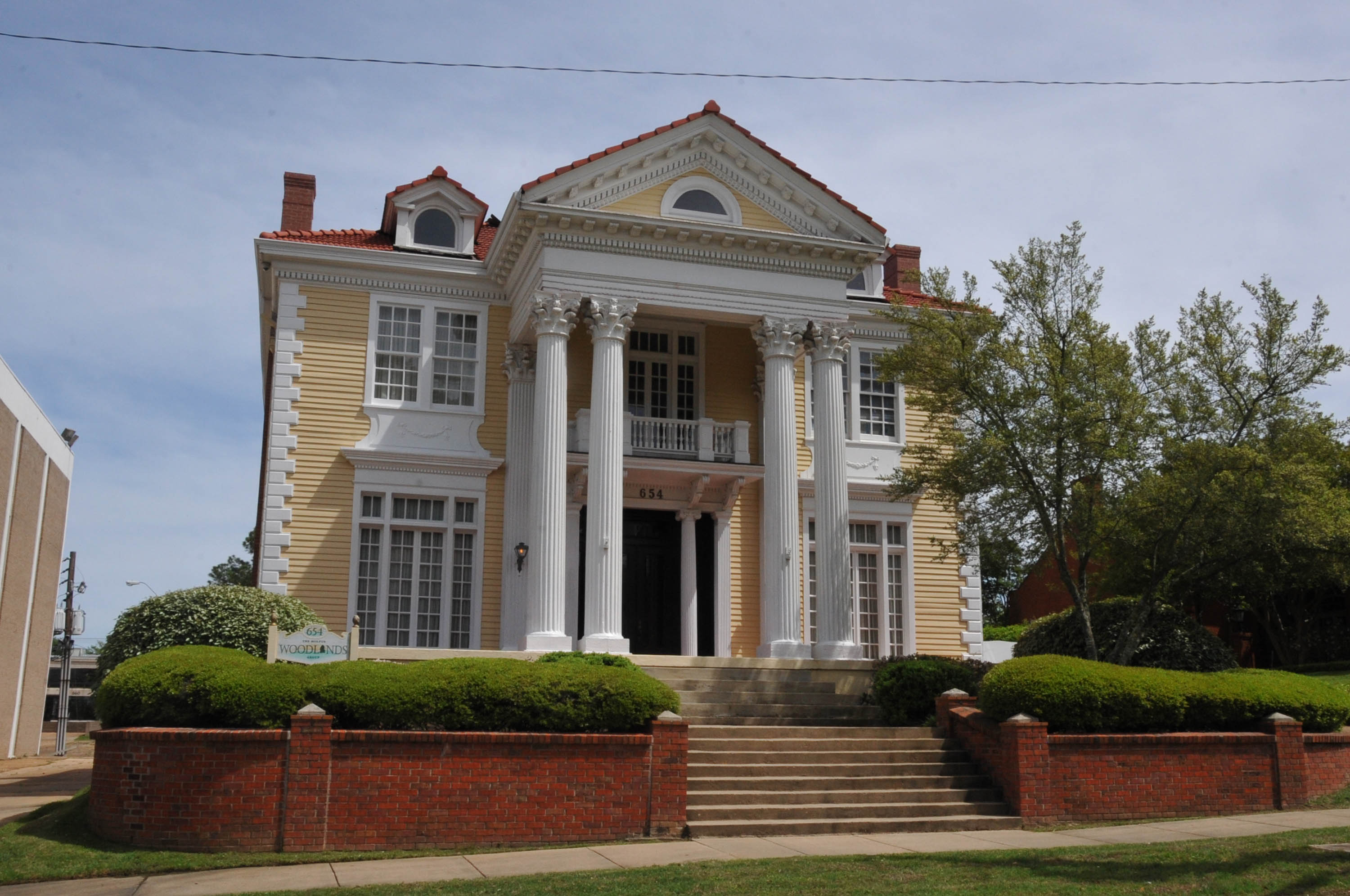
The Garner Wynn Green House, designed by Hull.

Hull designed many buildings in Mississippi, including in his hometown of Jackson. For example, he designed the Post Office Building and the Farmers' Market. Moreover, some of the houses he designed are listed on the National Register of Historic Places, like the Garner Wynn Green House, or the Mayes-Fridge-Briggs-Campbell House, the L. C. Nugent House, the Dr. N.C. Womack House, the Moran Berbette House, the Fred L. Nelson House, the Paul Chambers House, the J. N. McIntyre House, the Isidore Lehman House, the Emmett and Marie Hull House as part of the Belhaven Historic District, as well as the Pearl Spann House as part of the Belhaven Heights Historic District.

Hull designed the Mutton Building, Callendar Hall and Ellzey Hall on the campus of Copiah–Lincoln Community College in Wesson, Mississippi. He also designed several buildings on the campus of Tougaloo College, a historically black college in Tougaloo, Mississippi: Holmes Hall, Sarah Dickey Hall, Galloway Hall, Brownlee Hall and Judson Cross Hall. Additionally, he designed Alumni House, also known as Williams Hall, on the campus of Mississippi State University.

Hull designed Redus Hall and McComb Hall on the campus of the Chamberlain-Hunt Academy in Port Gibson, Mississippi, which are listed on the National Register of Historic Places as part of the Chamberlain-Hunt Academy Historic District. Additionally, he designed the St. Luke's Episcopal Church in Brandon, Mississippi, which is listed on the National Register of Historic Places as a contributing property to the Downtown Brandon Historic District.

With architects Edgar Lucian Malvaney, Frank P. Gates and Ransom Carey Jones, Hull designed Woolfolk State Office Building in Jackson in 1949.

== Personal life and death ==
Hull married Marie Atkindson, a painter, in 1917. They resided at 825 Belhaven Street in Jackson, where they attended the First Church of Christ Scientist.

Hull died in 1957 in Jackson, at the age of 75. He was buried at the Wright and Ferguson Funeral Home.
