= Whitehead and Lloyd Motor Company =

- U.S. National Register of Historic Places
- Location: 430 South State Street, Jackson, Mississippi, U.S.
- Area: 1 acre (0.40 ha)
- Architect: Edgar Lucian Malvaney
- NRHP reference No.: 100011332
- Added to NRHP: January 22, 2025

Whitehead and Lloyd Motor Company is a historic automobile dealership building at 430 South State Street in Jackson, Mississippi. It was added to the National Register of Historic Places in 2025.

Designed by Edgar Lucian Malvaney in the Art Moderne architecture style it was built in 1945 and was once part of Jackson's "Automobile Row". It is now home to the Mississippi Department of Public Safety's Driver License bureau.

== See also ==
- National Register of Historic Places listings in Hinds County, Mississippi
