= Andrew Bucci =

American artist (1922–2014)

- Born: Andrew Anthony Bucci Jr. January 12, 1922; Vicksburg, Mississippi, U.S.
- Died: November 16, 2014 (aged 92); Ridgeland, Mississippi
- Resting place: Vicksburg, Mississippi
- Education: Louisiana State University (B.S.); School of the Art Institute of Chicago (B.F.A., M.F.A.)
- Occupations: Painter, meteorologist

Andrew Bucci (January 12, 1922 – November 16, 2014) was an American artist from Mississippi.

== Early life ==
Andrew Bucci was born on January 12, 1922, in Vicksburg, Mississippi. He was influenced early in his career by Mississippi artist and teacher Marie Hull, with whom he began studying around 1940.

Bucci graduated from St. Aloysius High School in Vicksburg in 1938 and earned a degree in architectural engineering from Louisiana State University. After the outbreak of World War II, Bucci enlisted in the United States Army and received training in meteorology at New York University. Bucci served as a weather officer on air bases in England and Scotland during the war. When the war ended, he was stationed for several months at Orly Air Base near Paris and took life-drawing classes at the Académie Julian in 1945–46.

== Career ==
After the war, Bucci was hired by the U.S. Weather Bureau to work at its Vicksburg office. In 1947, he enrolled in the School of the Art Institute of Chicago, where he received a B.F.A. in 1951 and an M.F.A. in 1954. Between degrees he studied fashion illustration at Parsons School of Design (now known as Parsons The New School for Design).

In the late 1940s, Bucci was among the original group of artists to exhibit work and teach at Mississippi's first art colony at Allison's Wells Hotel. After a fire destroyed the hotel in 1963, Bucci continued his affiliation with the art colony for a number of years after it regrouped.

During the Korean War, Bucci was called back into military service as a weather officer at Lockbourne AFB in Ohio, which was operated by the Strategic Air Command. He served from March 1952 to August 1953, then returned to Chicago to complete his graduate degree. He retired from the military with the rank of major.

Bucci spent most of his career in Maryland and the Washington, D.C. area. He worked for the U.S. Weather Bureau's National Meteorological Center in Maryland, from 1956 until his retirement in 1979. He exhibited work in numerous D.C.-area galleries and served as president of the Washington Water Color Association from 1963 to 1965. In 1983, Bucci was artist-in-residence for a semester at Delta State University. He had recently resettled in Vicksburg at the time of his death.

Bucci designed the 5-cent United States Postal Service stamp commemorating the 150th anniversary of Mississippi statehood. The stamp was introduced on December 11, 1967.

In honor of the centennial of Bucci's birth and his contributions to the arts, the Mississippi Senate designated January 12, 2022 "Andrew Bucci Day" in Mississippi. Centennial exhibitions followed at Mississippi Department of Archives and History, Lauren Rogers Museum of Art, Vicksburg Art Association's Constitution Firehouse Gallery, and Walter Anderson Museum of Art.

Bucci was the recipient of the Mississippi Arts Commission 2009 Governor's Award for Excellence in the Arts for lifetime achievement in the visual arts and the 2012 Mississippi Institute of Arts and Letters Lifetime Achievement award. Bucci's painting, "Figure in Green," was chosen by the USA International Ballet Competition as the signature image for the 2014 commemorative poster and program. In honor of the Bucci centennial in 2022, USA IBC announced that Bucci's artwork had been selected for the 2023 commemorative poster and program.

Bucci's paintings have been viewed throughout the South for more than 75 years, beginning with the Mississippi Art Association in 1947 and including exhibitions at the Lauren Rogers Museum of Art in 1952, 1965, 1979 and 2000. His works have been part of numerous national and regional shows at the Corcoran Gallery of Art, Baltimore Museum of Art, Art Institute of Chicago, Pennsylvania Academy of Design and New Orleans Museum of Art, among others.

Bucci's works are in numerous collections, including the Mississippi Department of Archives and History, Arkansas Arts Center, Memphis Brooks Museum of Art, Mississippi Museum of Art, Ogden Museum of Southern Art, Florence Art Gallery and The Johnson Collection in South Carolina, Delta State University, Hinds Community College and Mississippi University for Women.

In 2021, the Mississippi Department of Archives and History established the Andrew Bucci Collection comprising Bucci's scrapbooks, student sketchbooks and artwork, photos, and other materials donated to MDAH by Bucci's estate. In January 2022, MDAH featured a selection of sketchbooks, artwork and photos from the Andrew Bucci Collection in the exhibit, "Emerging Grace: Andrew Bucci's Early Works."

In 2007 Bucci donated a number of materials to the Smithsonian Archives of American Art. The archive includes several of his own works of art, six figure drawings with fellow student H.C. Westermann modeling from a life drawing class at the School of the Art Institute of Chicago, 1947–48; letters, postcards, and handmade holiday cards to Bucci from artists Anna P. Baker, Marie Hull, Dan Flavin, and Hosford Fontaine; and printed material regarding the artists and the Allison's Wells art colony.

From May 26 to August 29, 2015, Belhaven University presented "Andrew Bucci: Rediscovered," a retrospective exhibition featuring works from Bucci's personal collection, predominantly oil paintings on canvas, spanning from the early 1950s to 2014. A catalogue produced for the exhibition features photographs of Bucci and his artwork by James Patterson.

== Death ==
Bucci died on November 16, 2014, shortly after resettling in Vicksburg, Mississippi.
