= Phoebe Omlie =

American aviation pioneer (1902–1975)

- Born: Phoebe Jane Fairgrave; November 21, 1902; Des Moines, Iowa, U.S.
- Died: July 17, 1975 (aged 72); Indianapolis, Indiana, U.S.
- Resting place: Forest Hill Cemetery; Memphis, Tennessee, U.S.
- Known for: Numerous firsts as a female pilot
- Spouse: Vernon Omlie

Phoebe Jane Fairgrave Omlie (November 21, 1902 – July 17, 1975) was an American aviation pioneer, particularly noted for her accomplishments as an early female aviator. Omlie was the first woman to receive an airplane mechanic's license, the first licensed female transport pilot, and the first woman to be appointed to a federal position in the aviation field.

During the late 1920s and early 1930s, Omlie set several world records in aviation, including the highest altitude parachute jump by a woman. She was also the first woman to cross the Rocky Mountains in a light aircraft, and was considered by First Lady Eleanor Roosevelt to be one of "eleven women whose achievements make it safe to say the world is progressing".

== Early life ==
Phoebe Jane Fairgrave was born in Des Moines, Iowa on November 21, 1902, and was the only daughter of parents Harry J. Park and Madge Traister Park. After divorcing Harry Park, Madge married Andrew Fairgrave, who adopted her two children, Phoebe and Paul. Phoebe and her brother, Paul, attended Oak Park School in Des Moines until she was 12, when she and her family moved to St. Paul, Minnesota. There, Fairgrave attended Madison School and Mechanic Arts High School and graduated in 1920. Fairgrave's interest in aviation was sparked the day before she graduated, when President Woodrow Wilson visited Minneapolis. President Wilson's visit was commemorated by a flyover and was the first airshow of any kind that Fairgrave had witnessed.

== Aviation career ==
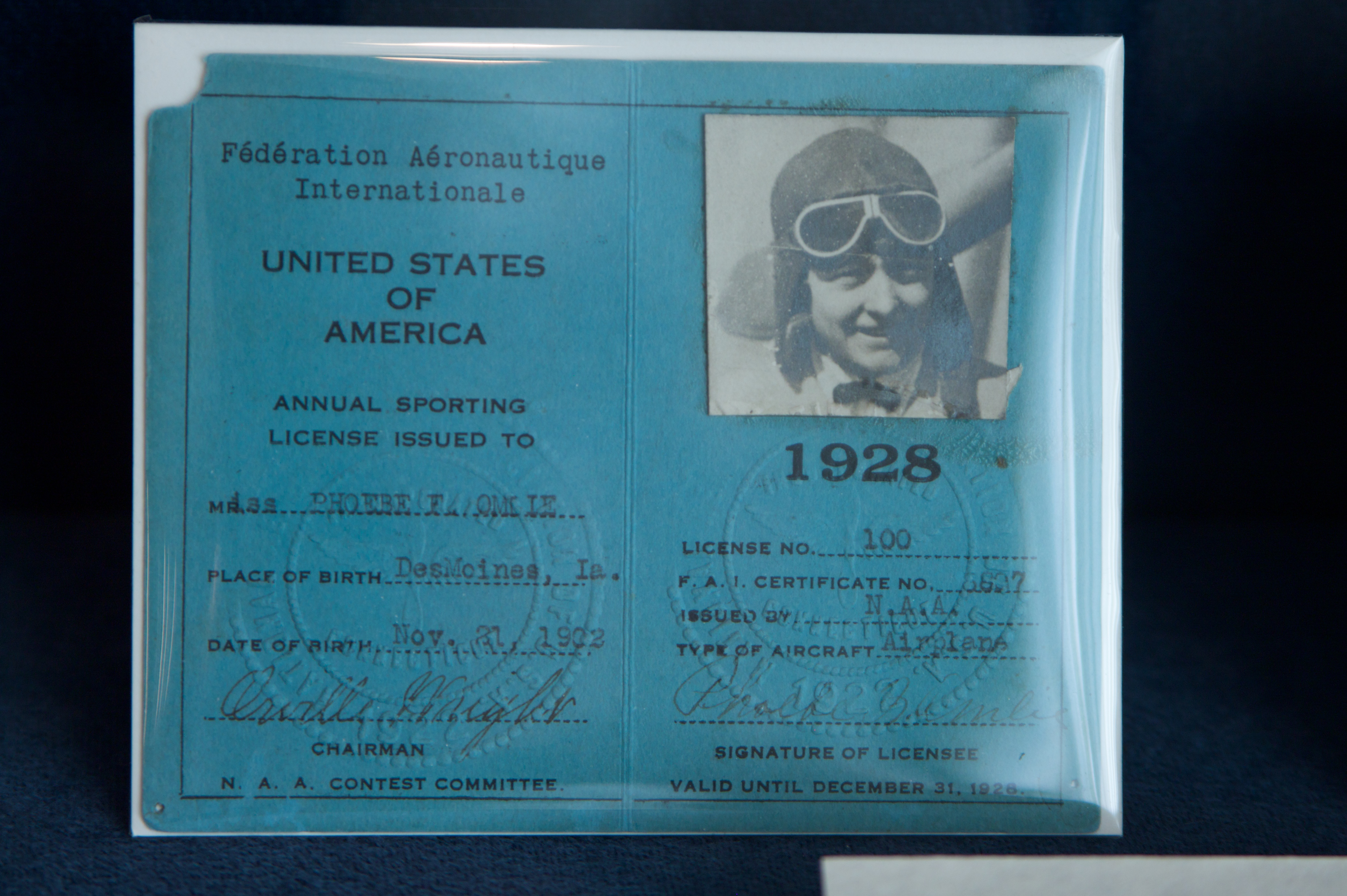
Omlie's flying license—signed by Orville Wright—at the Pink Palace Museum in Memphis, Tennessee

Shortly after graduating high school, Fairgrave spent a few months at the Guy Durrell Dramatic School and worked briefly as a secretary. Bored with the prospects, she began hanging around airfields near her home and attempted to convince the airport manager to allow one of his flight instructors to take her flying. The manager finally agreed, thinking that he could scare Fairgrave's interest in aviation out of her by performing various aerobatic maneuvers in an attempt to make her sick. Instead, Fairgrave demanded more flight time and used some of her inheritance to purchase a Curtiss JN-4 biplane after her fourth flight.

Still in her teens, Fairgrave started performing stunts on the wing of her aircraft as another pilot remained at the controls. Fairgrave began wing walking, learned to hang below the plane by her teeth, parachute, and "dance the Charleston on the top wing". Using the stunts she had learned, Fairgrave claimed the record for the highest parachute jump for a woman by jumping from her plane at 15,200 ft (4,600 m) (MSL) and earned a movie deal, flying aerobatic stunts for the film serial The Perils of Pauline. This was her first flight with Vernon C. Omlie, who would become her husband. Following the record setting jump, Fairgrave and Omlie flew around the country on a barnstorming tour and eventually married in 1922.

In 1925, the Omlies moved to Memphis, Tennessee and began offering flying lessons and mechanical services to local residents. A year later, in 1927, Phoebe became the first woman to receive an airplane mechanic's license, as well as the first licensed female transport pilot. While Vernon continued operating the business and working as a flight instructor, Phoebe began working for the Mono Aircraft Company. Flying the company's Monocoupe 90 light aircraft out of Quad City International Airport in 1928, Omlie set a world altitude record for women when she reached 25,400 ft (7,700 m) (MSL). That same year, Omlie competed in the Edsel Ford Air Tour and became the first woman to cross the Rocky Mountains in a light aircraft. Omlie later joined the Ninety-Nines as a charter member after competing in a race with Amelia Earhart.

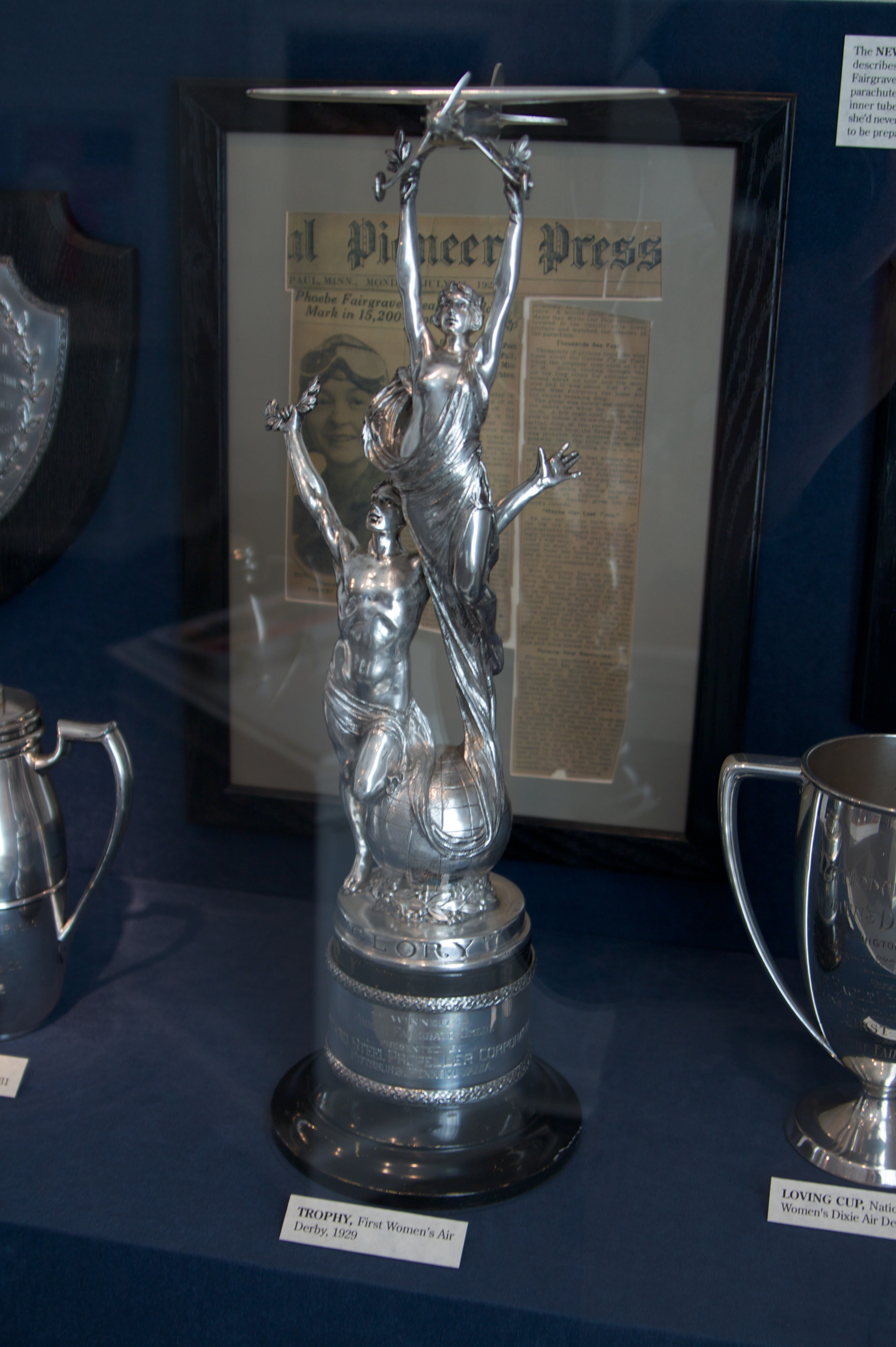
1929 Women's Air Derby trophy won by Omlie on display at the Pink Palace

Omlie's success as a pilot was recognized by the Democratic National Committee, and she was enlisted to fly a female speaker around the country for Governor Franklin D. Roosevelt's 1932 presidential campaign. After the successful campaign, Omlie was appointed by President Roosevelt as the "Special Adviser for Air Intelligence to the National Advisory Committee for Aeronautics". This made her the first woman to be appointed to a federal aviation position. In this role, Omlie acted as a "liaison between the National Advisory Committee of Aeronautics and the Bureau of Air Commerce" alongside Amelia Earhart to create what would become the National Airspace System.

On August 5, 1936, Vernon Omlie was a passenger on Chicago and Southern Air Lines Flight 4 when it crashed in foggy conditions shortly after taking off from St. Louis, Missouri, killing all eight people on board. Phoebe Omlie immediately resigned her position in Washington, D.C., and returned to Memphis. Following her husband's death, Omlie did not return to Washington, D.C., until 1941, when she accepted a job as "Senior Private Flying Specialist of the Civil Aeronautics Authority". In this position, and to meet the severe need for pilots for service in WWII, Omlie established 66 flight schools in 46 states, including a school in Tuskegee, Alabama that would later train the famous Tuskegee Airmen. With the Tennessee Bureau of Aeronautics, she established an "experimental" program to train women as instructors. The first class, ten women from various states, trained between September and February 1943, and was meant to establish her strong and, to some, controversial belief that " . . . if women can teach men to walk, they can teach them to fly." These women went on to instruct both men and women pilots both in military and civilian flight training programs, including the Navy V-5 and the USAAF Women Airforce Service Pilots.

Unhappy about the increasing regulation of the aviation industry by the United States Federal Government under President Harry S. Truman, Omlie resigned in 1952 and left aviation.

== Later life ==
After resigning from the Civil Aeronautics Authority, Omlie returned to Memphis and purchased a cattle farm in Como, Mississippi. Omlie's inexperience with farming caused hardship for the business, so she traded the farm around 1957 for a small cafe and hotel in Lambert, Mississippi. The hotel business proved to be just as unsuccessful for Omlie, who returned to Memphis in 1961.

Omlie periodically spoke to aviation groups about her concerns over increasing federal regulation of the industry, but the speaking engagements dwindled over time and ceased by 1970. The last five years of Omlie's life were spent in seclusion, living in a flophouse in Indianapolis, Indiana, fighting lung cancer and alcoholism. Omlie died on July 17, 1975, and was buried next to her husband in Forest Hill Cemetery in Memphis.

In June 1982, a new air traffic control tower was dedicated and named in honor of Phoebe and Vernon Omlie at the Memphis International Airport.
