= War Memorial Building (Jackson, Mississippi) =

- U.S. Historic district – Contributing property
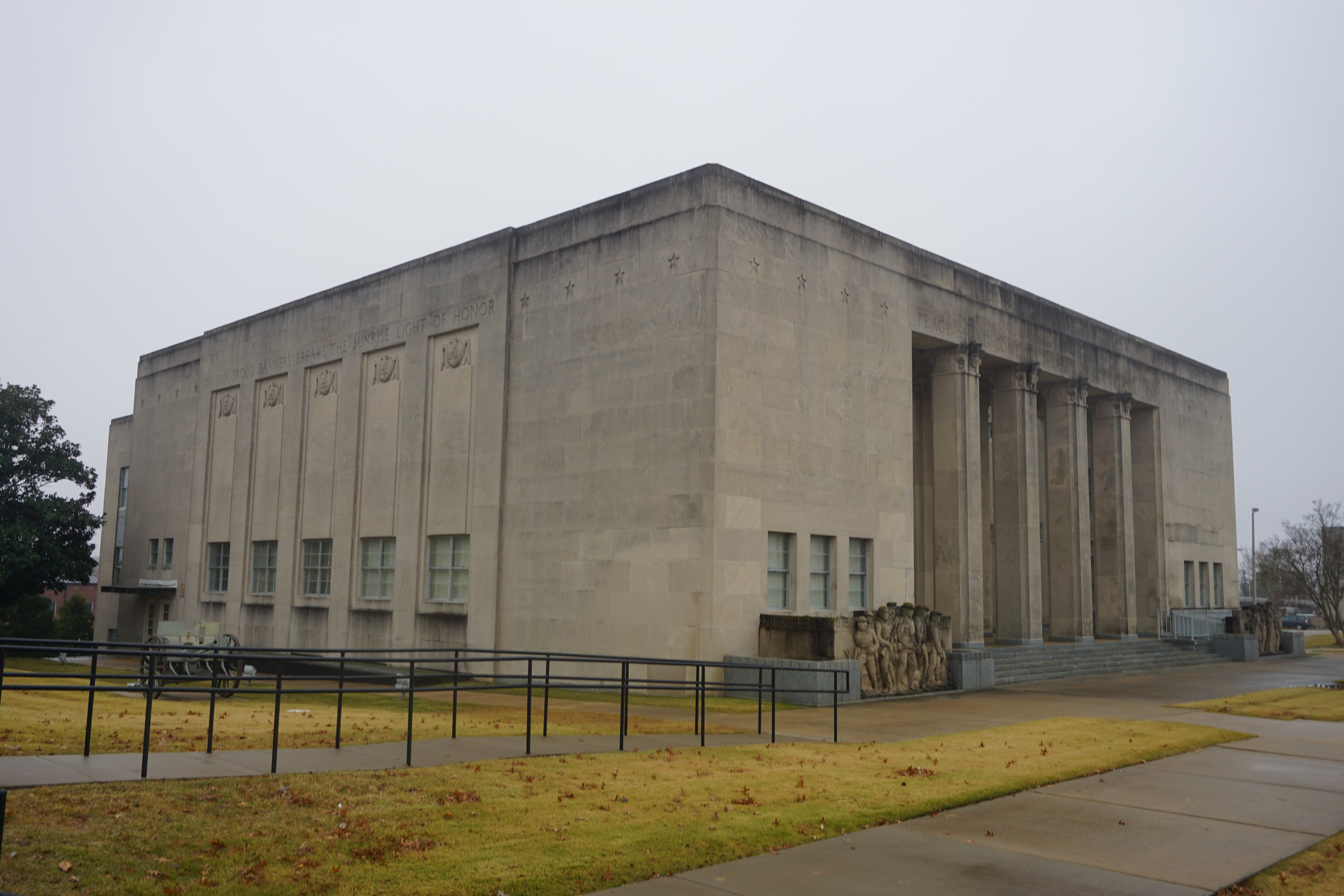
- War Memorial Building, Jackson, Mississippi

- Location within Mississippi Location within the United States
- Location: Old Capitol Green, Jackson, Mississippi
- Coordinates: 32.299801°N 90.179388°W
- Built: 1939-1940
- Built by: M. T. Reed Construction Company, W. J. McGee and Son
- Architect: E.L. Malvaney, principal architect
- Part of: Capitol Green (ID69000083)
- Designated CP: November 25, 1969

The War Memorial Building is a historic building in Jackson, Mississippi, U.S.. It was designed by architect Edgar Lucian Malvaney, and built in 1939–1940. It has been listed on the National Register of Historic Places as a contributing property in the Capitol Green since November 25, 1969.

Sculptor Albert Rieker designed two friezes on the building.

Art Deco column capital detail
