= Garner Wynn Green House =

Historic house in Mississippi, United States

- U.S. National Register of Historic Places
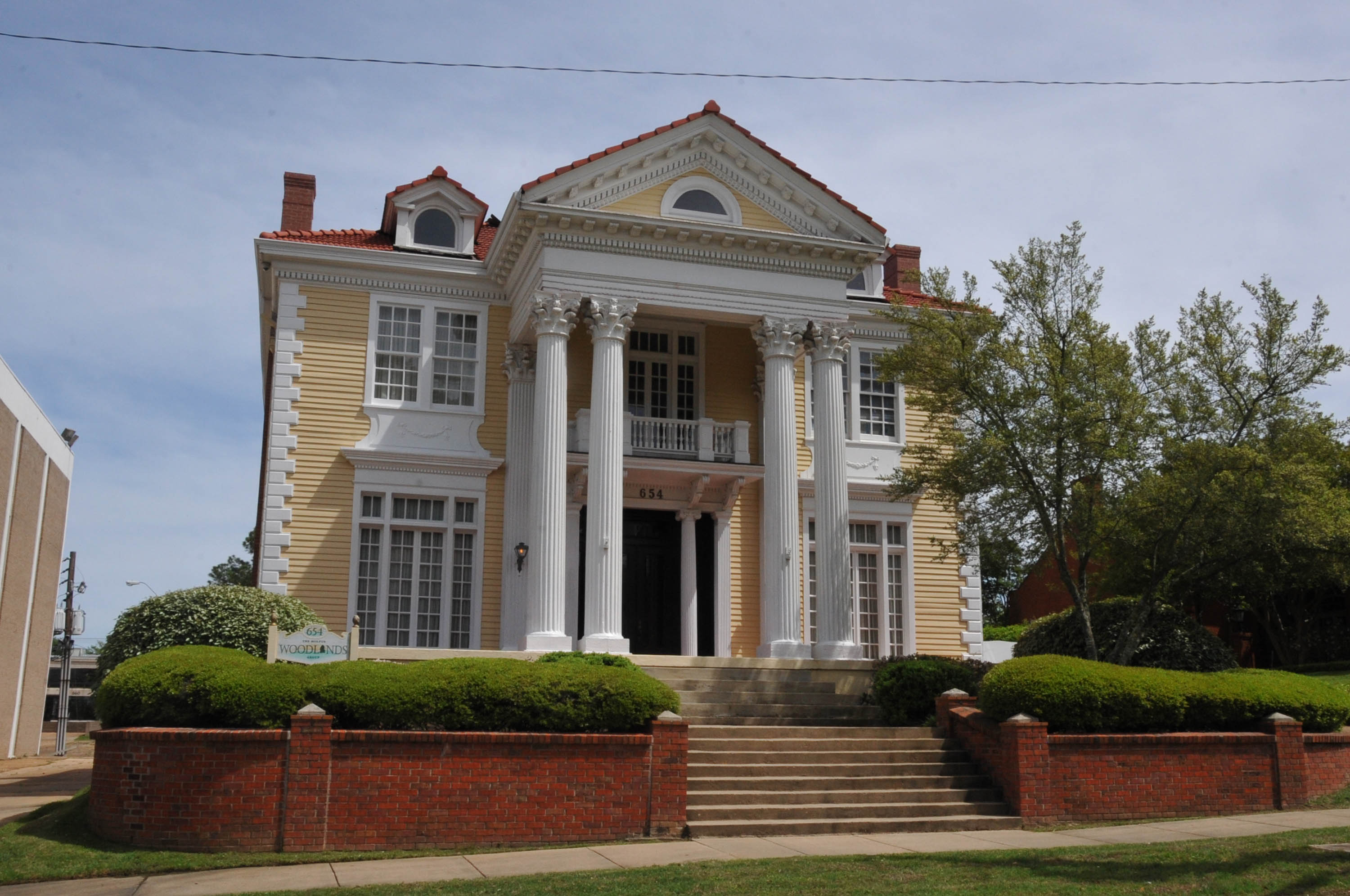
- The Garner Wynn Green House in 2008

- Location within Mississippi Location within the United States
- Location: 647 North State Street, Jackson, Mississippi
- Coordinates: 32°18′20″N 90°10′45″W
- Area: less than one acre
- Built: 1910
- Architect: Emmett J. Hull
- Architectural style: Classical Revival
- NRHP reference No.: 85003440
- Added to NRHP: October 31, 1985

The Garner Wynn Green House is a historic mansion in Jackson, Mississippi, U.S.. It was built in 1910 for Garner Wynn Green, an attorney whose ancestors were the co-founders of the city of Jackson. It was designed in the Classical Revival style by architect Emmett J. Hull. It has been listed on the National Register of Historic Places since October 31, 1985.
