= Henry Minor Faser =

American administrator and activist (1882–1960)

- Born: January 21, 1882; Macon, Mississippi, U.S.
- Died: January 12, 1960 (aged 77); Vicksburg, Mississippi, U.S.
- Education: St. Louis College of Pharmacy
- Occupations: Academic administrator, businessman
- Spouse: Linda Sultan
- Children: 1 son, 1 daughter
- Relatives: Raymond Birchett (son-in-law); Chris Faser Jr. (nephew)

Henry Minor Faser (January 21, 1882 - January 12, 1960) was an American academic administrator, life insurance business executive and political activist. He was the founding dean of the University of Mississippi School of Pharmacy, the vice president of the Lamar Life Insurance Company, and a supporter of the States' Rights Democratic Party's 1948 presidential campaign.

== Early life and education ==
Henry Minor Faser was born on January 21, 1882, in Macon, Mississippi. He grew up in Winona, Mississippi, and he had a brother and a sister.

Faser graduated from the St. Louis College of Pharmacy in 1902. He was awarded a Bachelor of Science degree in pharmacy from the University of Mississippi in 1925, and he served as the president of its alumni association in 1941.

== Career ==
Faser began his career as a druggist in Oxford, Mississippi. He served on the Mississippi State Board of Pharmacy from 1904 to 1912, including as president in 1912. He was the founding dean of the School of Pharmacy at the University of Mississippi from 1908 to 1928. While the board of trustees approved the establishment of the school, it was Governor Edmond Noel who was convinced by Faser into funding it in 1908.

Faser served on the board of directors of the Bank of Oxford. He worked for the Penn Mutual in Jackson from 1928 to 1941, when he became vice president of the Lamar Life Insurance Company, also in Jackson, until 1952.

== Personal life ==
Faser married Linda Sultan, who predeceased him in 1952. They had a son, Henry Minor Faser, Jr., and a daughter, Emma Katherine Faser, who married architect Raymond Birchett. He resided at the King Edward Hotel in Jackson, Mississippi. He was "a Mason, a Knight Templar, a Shriner, and a member of the Presbyterian Church." His nephew was Chris Faser Jr.

Faser died on January 12, 1960, in Vicksburg, Mississippi. Faser Hall on the Ole Miss campus was named in his honor in 1970. His daughter bequeathed the "largest gift ever" to the University of Mississippi upon her death.

=== Politics ===
Faser was a supporter of states' rights. At the 1948 Democratic National Convention, he "stole the Mississippi flag from the balcony, [...], hid it under his coat, and led the state delegation when it marched out in a split with the national party." He was also "active" in the States' Rights Democratic Party, and he supported Strom Thurmond's 1948 presidential campaign alongside vice presidential candidate Fielding Wright.

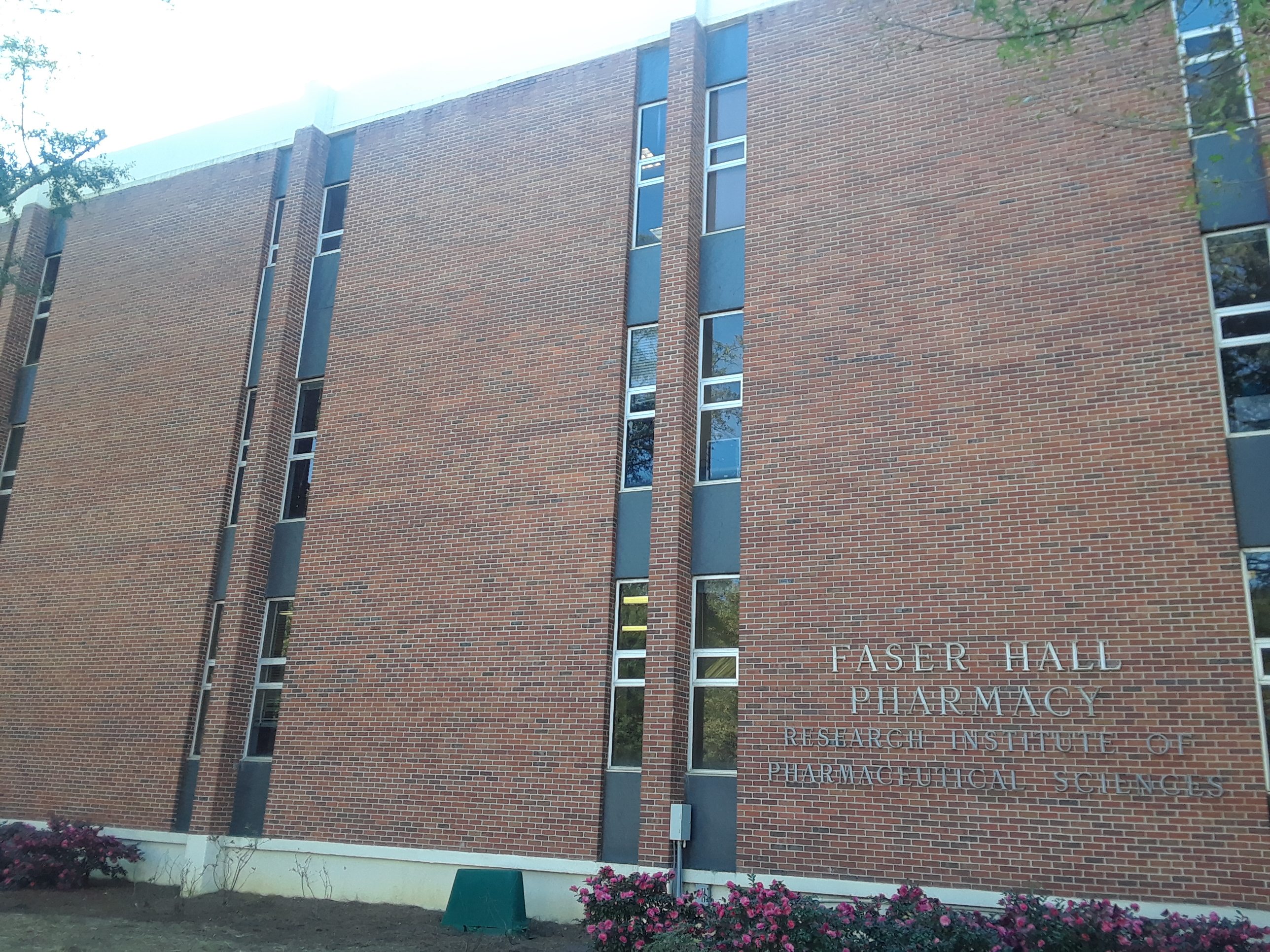
Faser Hall on the campus of the University of Mississippi.

== Works ==
- Faser, Henry Minor (1926). Laboratory Manual of Pharmacy for Students and Pharmacists. OCLC 18562664.
