= Chicago Technology Academy =

High school in Chicago, Illinois, US

Coordinates: 41.8632°N 87.6593°W

- 1301 West 14th Street; Chicago, Illinois 60608; United States

Information
- Type: High school
- Established: September 2009; 16 years ago

Chicago Tech Academy (Chicago Tech) is a high school in the Chicago University Village in Pilsen. Chicago Tech opened in September 2009 as the city's first technology high school. The building was formerly Joseph Medill Elementary School. After being open for 5 years, the school was partnered with High Tech High in an attempt to stay open. With the partnership, they received a new principal and school support system, and transitioned to project-based learning.
