= Raymond Birchett =

American architect

- Born: Clarence Raymond Birchett; 1902; Vicksburg, Mississippi, U.S.
- Died: January 17, 1974 (aged 71–72); Jackson, Mississippi, U.S.
- Resting place: Lakewood Memorial Place
- Education: University of Mississippi; University of Illinois
- Occupation: Architect
- Spouse: Emma Katherine Faser
- Relatives: Henry Minor Faser

Raymond Birchett (1902 - January 17, 1974) was an American architect. He designed commercial and school buildings in Mississippi, including several buildings on the campus of Mississippi Valley State University.

== Early life ==
Raymond Birchett was born in 1902 in Vicksburg, Mississippi. He attended the University of Mississippi from 1920 to 1922, and he earned a bachelor's degree in architectural engineering from the University of Illinois at Urbana–Champaign in 1925.

During World War II, Birchett served in the United States Army in Italy for two and a half years, and retired as a colonel.

== Career ==
Birchett designed commercial buildings like the Coca Cola Bottling Company building in Vicksburg, or school buildings like the Carr Central High School, also in Vicksburg.

Birchett designed several buildings on the campus of Mississippi Valley State University, a historically black college in Leflore County, Mississippi, including. the College Cafeteria/Laundrette, the Fielding L. Wright Mathematics & Science Center, the Sophomore Women's Dormitory, the Home-Economics Building, the Assembly Building, the Trades Building, the Music Men's Dormitory, and the (old) Faculty Apartments.

Birchett was a member of the American Institute of Architects and the Association of Professional Engineers.

== Personal life and death ==
Birchett married Emma Katherine Faser, the daughter of Ole Miss School of Pharmacy Dean Henry Minor Faser, in 1934. They resided at 2515 Eastover Drive in Jackson, Mississippi. He was a member of the Episcopal Church.

Birchett died on January 17, 1974, at the Mississippi Baptist Hospital in Jackson, and he was buried at Lakewood Memorial Place.
