= Edgar Lucian Malvaney =

American architect (1896–1970)

- Born: 1896; Jackson, Mississippi, U.S.
- Died: 1970 (aged 73–74)
- Other name: E. L. Malvaney
- Education: Mississippi State University; Washington University in St. Louis
- Occupation: Architect
- Spouse: Corrine Burkett
- Children: 2

Edgar Lucian "E. L." Malvaney (1896–1970) was an American architect in Jackson, Mississippi. Malvaney designed many buildings, including several listed on the National Register of Historic Places including the War Memorial Building, listed on the National Register of Historic Places in Hinds County as a contributing property.

== Life and career ==
Edgar Lucian Malvaney was born in 1896, in Jackson, Mississippi. He spent one year at Mississippi A & M University before joining the American Expeditionary Force during World War I and serving in France and going over to France to fight during WWI. He continued his studies there before returning to Jackson in 1919. He received an architecture degree from Washington University in St. Louis in 1922.

Malvaney worked for Theodore Link, C. H. Lindley and was involved in a partnership with his cousin Emmett J. Hull at Hull & Malvaney in 1926, before opening his own firm in 1931.

He designed several schools, hospitals, government buildings, and commercial buildings.

His son, E. Louis Malvaney (1924–2014), was also an architect.

== Work ==
- Contributing property in the Carthage Historic District in Carthage, Mississippi
- Contributing property to the Downtown Waynesboro Historic District in Waynesboro, Mississippi
- Eupora High School in Eupora, Mississippi
- Vaiden High School, 504 Mulberry Street in Vaiden, Mississippi, listed on the National Register of Historic Places
- Ritz Theatre (1943/4) in Jackson, Mississippi
- Carver Central High School, several of its brick buildings, in Collins, Mississippi. Listed on the NRHP
- War Memorial
- Leake County Courthouse (1930s), a Mississippi Landmark and part of the Carthage Historic District
- Whitehead and Lloyd Motor Company (1945) in Jackson, Mississippi; NHRP-listed Art Moderne auto dealership
