= 2023 Rolling Fork tornado =

EF4 tornado in Mississippi, US

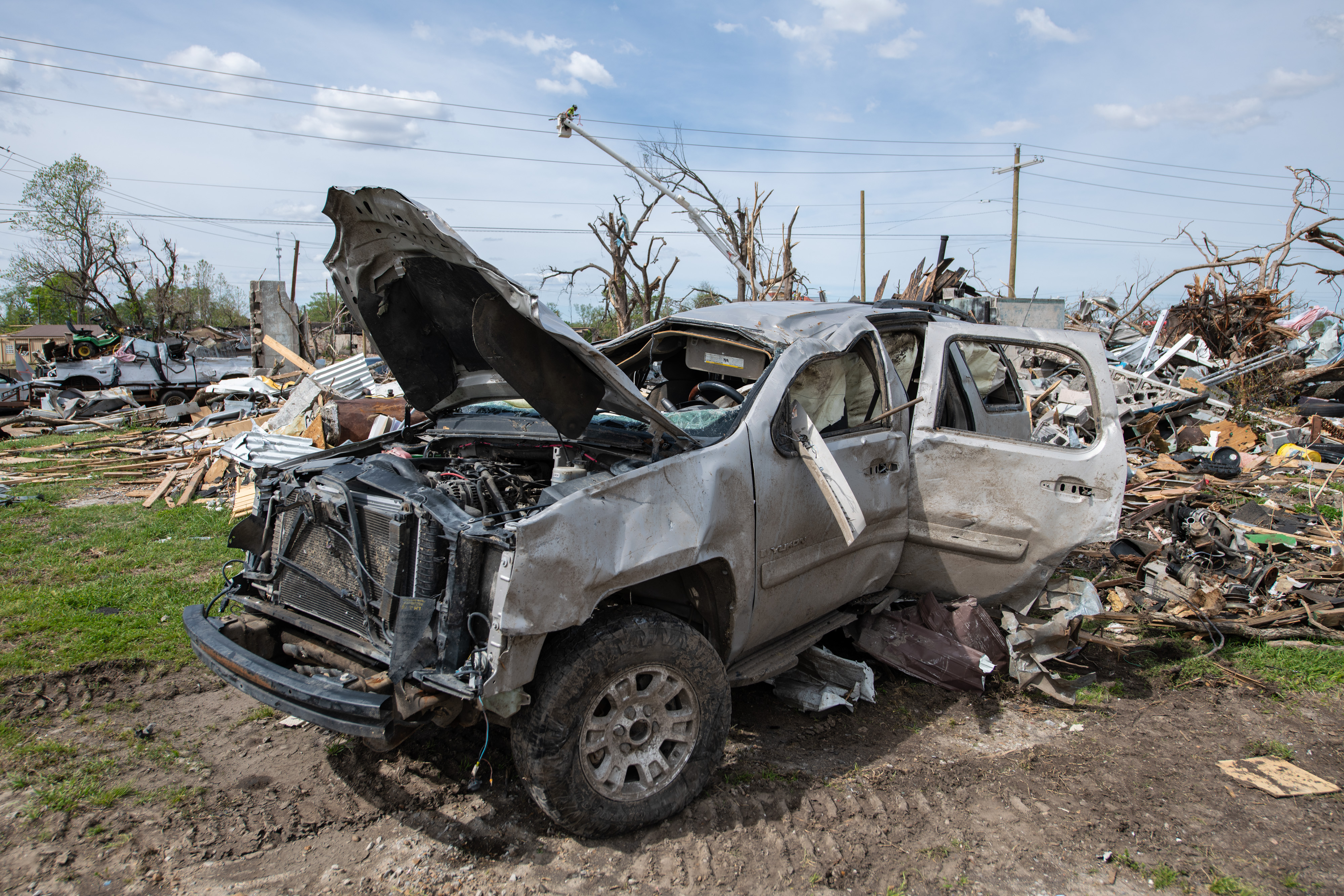
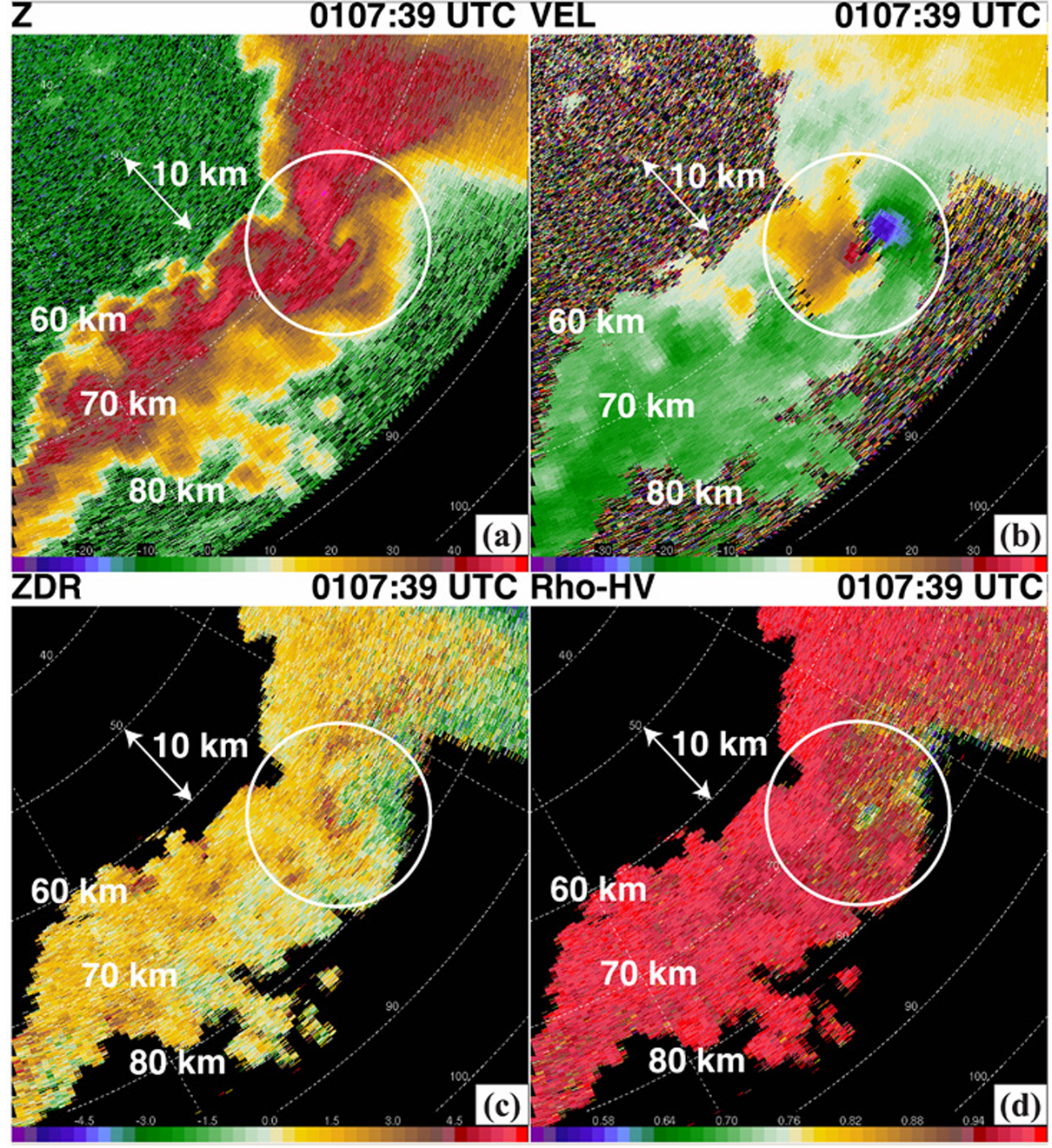
- Clockwise from top: The tornado illuminated by lightning; The tornado seen from the University of Illinois Urbana-Champaign COW Radar; A damaged SUV amid debris in Rolling Fork following the storm

Meteorological history
- Formed: March 24, 2023, 7:57 p.m. CDT (UTC−05:00)
- Dissipated: March 24, 2023, 9:08 pm. CDT (UTC−05:00)
- Duration: 1 hour, 11 minutes

EF4 tornado
- on the Enhanced Fujita scale
- Max width: 1,320 yd (0.75 mi; 1.21 km)
- Path length: 59.4 mi (95.6 km)
- Highest winds: 195 mph (314 km/h)

Overall effects
- Fatalities: 17
- Injuries: 165
- Damage: $96.6–100 million (2023 USD) Damage estimates: >$96,644,200 (2023 USD) Per NOAA; $100,000,000 (2023 USD) Per MID via PBS
- Part of the Tornado outbreak of March 24–27, 2023 and Tornadoes of 2023

On the evening of Friday, March 24, 2023, a large, violent, and long-tracked multi-vortex wedge tornado struck the Mississippi towns of Rolling Fork, Silver City, and Midnight. The tornado, known most simply as the Rolling Fork tornado or informally the Rolling Fork-Silver City Tornado by the National Weather Service (NWS), killed 17 people and injured at least 165 others. Part of a wider tornado outbreak sequence across the Southern United States, this tornado was the deadliest and strongest of the event. It caused catastrophic damage in Rolling Fork and significant damage in Silver City. The NWS assigned the tornado a rating of EF4 on the Enhanced Fujita scale, with estimated peak winds of 195 miles per hour (314 km/h).

The tornado touched down in Issaquena County and rapidly intensified as it tracked northeastward into Sharkey County, reaching EF4 intensity as it approached Rolling Fork. It caused extensive destruction in Rolling Fork, leveling numerous homes and businesses, including a well-built flower shop that sustained high-end EF4 damage. The tornado continued through Humphreys County, impacting Midnight before causing further significant EF2 damage in Silver City. The tornado remained on the ground for 1 hour and 11 minutes, tracking 59.4 mi (95.6 km) before dissipating in Holmes County.

The devastation led to a major disaster declaration by President Joe Biden. The towns of Rolling Fork and Silver City faced a prolonged recovery, with hundreds of residents displaced and significant rebuilding efforts initiated. Insured losses were estimated near $100 million (2023 USD). Discussions arose among meteorologists regarding whether the tornado warranted an EF5 rating based on certain damage indicators, though it was ultimately given a high-end EF4 rating.

== Meteorological synopsis ==
On March 18, an upper-level trough was situated across the Western United States. As time progressed, the trough began to progress to the east. By March 20, forecasters at the National Weather Service's Storm Prediction Center were calling attention to "some potential for discrete storms" in Mississippi on March 24 ahead of the cold front, their severity contingent on prior destabilization of the atmosphere. On March 22, the National Weather Service's Storm Prediction Center (SPC) issued a level 3/enhanced risk of severe weather across portions of Louisiana, Arkansas, and Mississippi for supercell thunderstorms capable of large hail, damaging winds, and strong tornadoes (EF2+ on the Enhanced Fujita scale). The enhanced risk was expanded northward the following day, and the original outlined area was upgraded to a level 4/moderate risk.

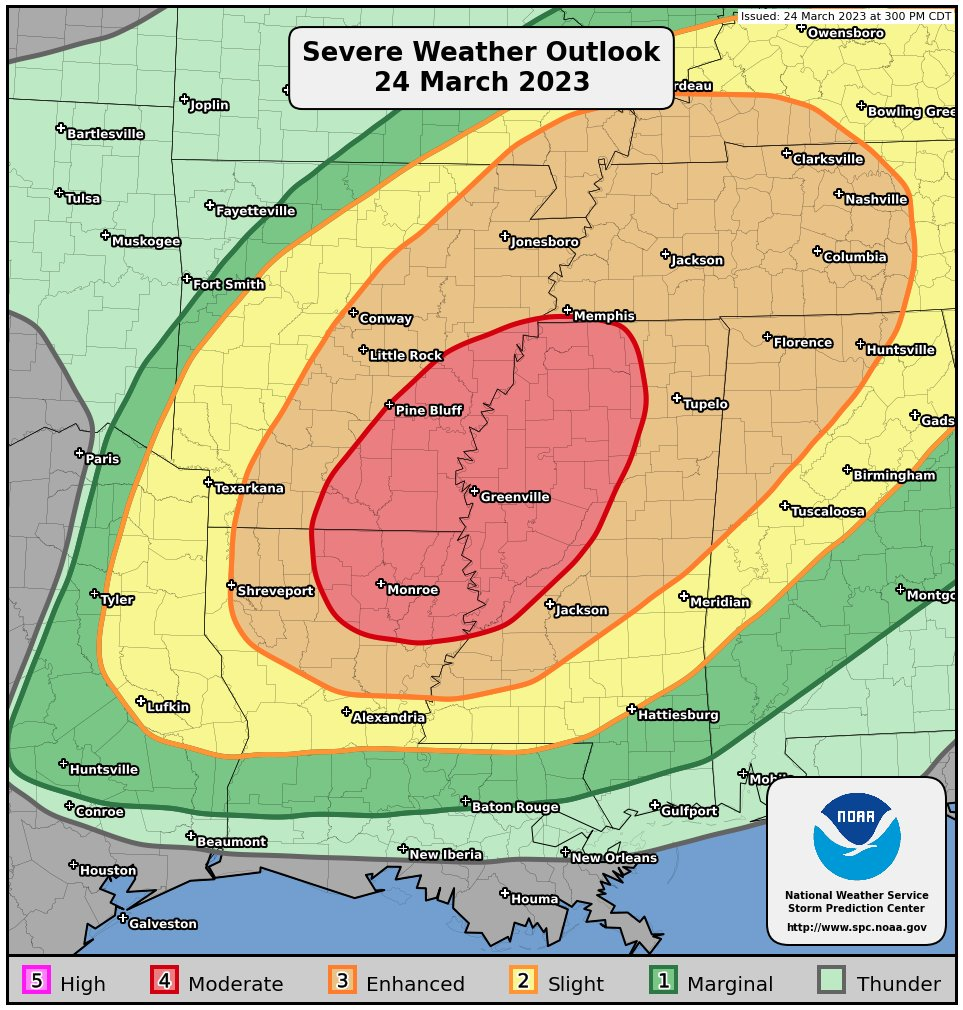
The Storm Prediction Center’s Severe Weather Outlook for March 24, 2023

On March 24, water vapor imagery showed a potent mid-level trough. Strong mid-level winds between the trough and strong high-pressure area across the Southeastern United States were displaying in models as well. Meanwhile, a quickly deepening low-pressure area was expected to drag a warm front northward, leading to a broad, unstable air mass to its south. Although some reduction in moisture was expected across Mississippi due to drier air aloft and warm surface temperatures into the 80s Fahrenheit, continued advection of moist air from the Gulf of Mexico seemed supportive of dewpoints in the upper 60s and lower 70s across Louisiana, Arkansas, and Mississippi by the evening hours. Thus, mixed-layer convective available potential energy was expected to rise into the 1,500–2,000 J/kg range. Forecasters initially thought that strong forcing of ascent across Arkansas would lead to an organized squall line capable of both tornadoes and damaging winds, whereas more discrete supercells would be possible farther south, particularly along north–south oriented confluence bands in the open warm sector. The tornado threat relied on the amount of wind shear in the lower levels, which would aid in sustaining supercells.

=== Storm development ===
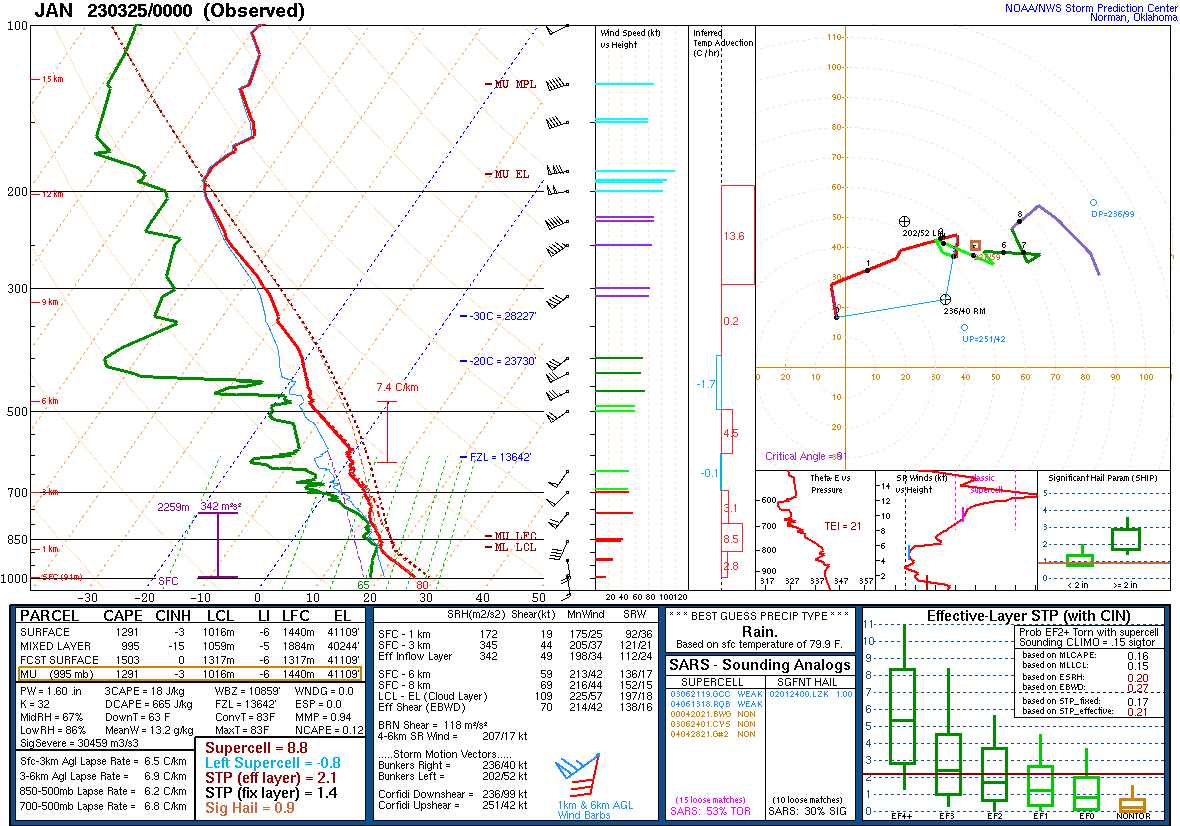
An observed sounding from Jackson, Mississippi, launched less than an hour before the EF4 tornado began

A tornado watch was issued at 5:15 p.m. Central Daylight Time (UTC−5) for portions of eastern Arkansas, northeastern Louisiana, central and northern Mississippi, and western Tennessee. The watch mentioned the possibility of several strong to intense tornadoes with persistent supercells. Clusters of storms evolved along the confluence bands in conjunction with improving wind shear profiles. However, given their displacement from the surface low and better forcing, there was some uncertainty as to whether they would become better organized. A strengthening low-level jet and surface moisture increased confidence in the maturation of these cells, but tornadic development had not yet begun in the area as of 00:00 UTC.

At their 01:00 UTC outlook, the SPC lowered the probability of tornadoes to a 10% (significant) tornado area, thus downgrading the moderate risk to an enhanced risk. The SPC cited weaker than expected instability in the area, with increased confidence in only limited buoyancy developing. However, the same update noted that "a couple of longer-track supercells" and "a few strong tornadoes" remained possible.

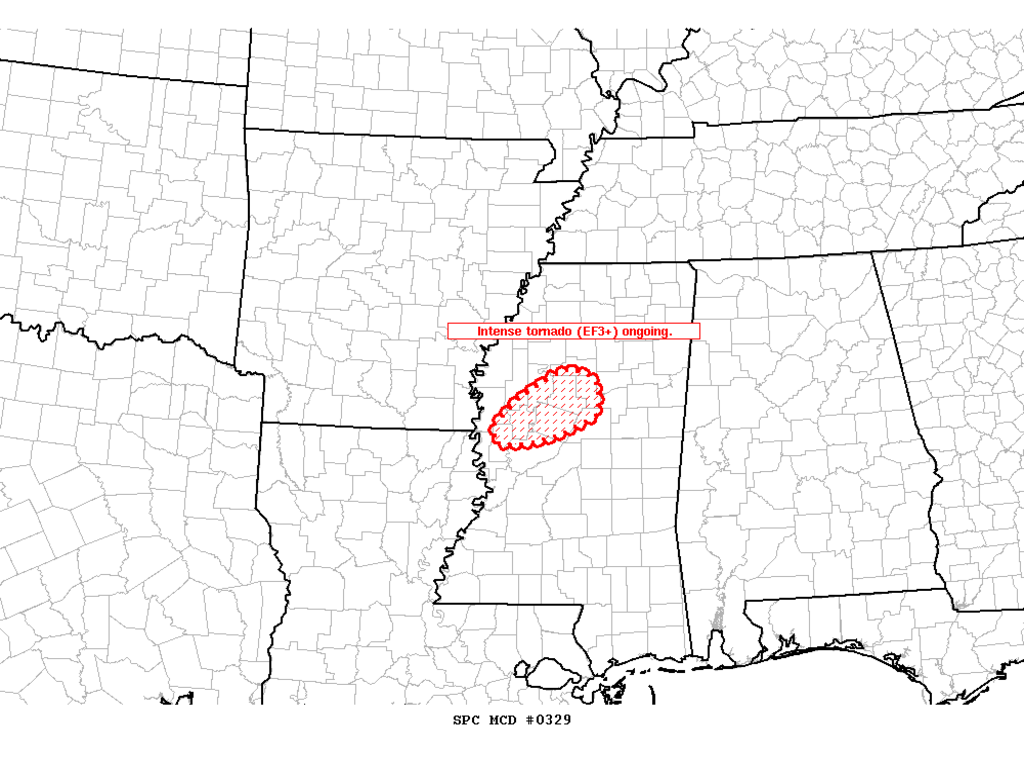
A meso-gamma mesoscale discussion issued by the Storm Prediction Center while the EF4 tornado was ongoing

As the update was being issued, a strong supercell evolved near the Louisiana-Mississippi border. By 7:57 pm. CDT, a strong velocity couplet formed at the base of the supercell, which then produced what would become this long-tracked violent EF4 tornado, and at 8:04 pm, as the storm approached the town of Rolling Fork, a tornado emergency was placed. Afterwards, the tornado struck Rolling Fork, Midnight, and Silver City, inflicting catastrophic damage and causing over a dozen fatalities. While the violent EF4 tornado was on the ground, Harry Weinman, a forecaster at the SPC, issued a special meso-gamma mesoscale discussion for the tornado. In the discussion, the SPC stated that radar showed debris was being lofted at least 13,000 feet (4,000 m) into the air and that a vertical rotation of 70 knots (81 mph; 130 km/h) was also being detected. The SPC also indicated that this was likely an intense tornado, at least EF3, solely based on the Doppler radar data. The discussion concluded by noting that the downstream atmospheric environment would allow the storm producing the violent EF4 tornado to persist for 30 to 60 minutes.

== Tornado summary ==
Fatality locations from the tornado
| Fatalities | Fatality location |
|---|---|
| 10 | Mobile home/Trailer home |
| 4 | Permanent home |
| 2 | Business |
| 1 | Vehicle |

=== Formation ===
The storm that spawned the tornado first developed as a cluster of storms in northeastern Louisiana between 5:30 pm and 6:30 pm CDT and tracked northeastward. This cluster remained disorganized until they approached the Mississippi River, at which point a more favorable low-level jet allowed them to organize into a dangerous supercell thunderstorm rapidly. At 7:33 pm CDT, the National Weather Service in Jackson, Mississippi, issued a severe thunderstorm warning for the strengthening supercell with the threat being for the possibility of 60 mph wind gusts. Shortly after that, the supercell developed a mesocyclone that quickly intensified as it continued swiftly northeastward through Caldwell Parish, which prompted the issuance of a tornado warning at 7:45 pm CDT. A second tornado warning for areas downstream of the first warning, including Rolling Fork, was issued shortly afterwards at 7:53 pm CDT after the supercell crossed the Mississippi River. Four minutes later, the storm spawned the violent tornado that struck Rolling Fork.

The tornado first touched down in Issaquena County, southeast of Mayersville, east of the Mississippi River, at 7:57 pm CDT. The official touchdown point for the tornado was placed south-southwest of the intersection of Turner Road and Grant Road on the southeastern tip of a wooded area and then tracking on an east-northeastward course that quickly changed to a northeastward movement. However, this has been disputed by academic scholars due to aerial imagery showing that the official track is not co-located to the visually identified track. After touching down, the tornado caused EF1 damage to trees and snapped a small wooden power pole, with two barns also suffering minor damage as it crossed Grant Road before moving through the Steele Bayou Canal and into Sharkey County, causing sporadic tree damage, with some trees being uprooted. Four minutes before crossing the county line, the first report confirming the tornado's existence came at 7:58 pm CDT near Willett Road southeast of Mayersville. Both tornado warnings for the storm were upgraded to Particularly dangerous situation (PDS) warnings at 7:58 pm CDT and 7:59 pm CDT, respectively, based solely on the violent radar indicated rotation that was being detected, despite there not being clear evidence of this tornado's existence at the time.

The tornado then rapidly grew in size and strength as it approached Rolling Fork from the southwest, snapping and uprooting many trees in a wooded area at EF2 intensity, including some that sustained debarking. The tornado then reached low-end EF4 intensity for the first time and produced violent tree damage as it exited the wooded area, where severe debarking occurred, one tree was ripped out of the ground by its root ball, and pieces of shredded trees were thrown into an adjacent field. Several power transmission poles were downed, while EF1 to EF2 damage occurred farther from the center of the tornado's damage path as it crossed Bear Lake Road, where a house lost its roof and exterior walls, and two residences west of that home lost significant portions of their roof covering. A mobile home was also rolled in this area. At that time, the violent rotation of radar paired with a debris signature that began to be detected at 8:02 pm CDT prompted the National Weather Service to upgrade the second PDS tornado warning to a tornado emergency at 8:04 pm CDT; the tornado would remain under this tag for most of its existence.

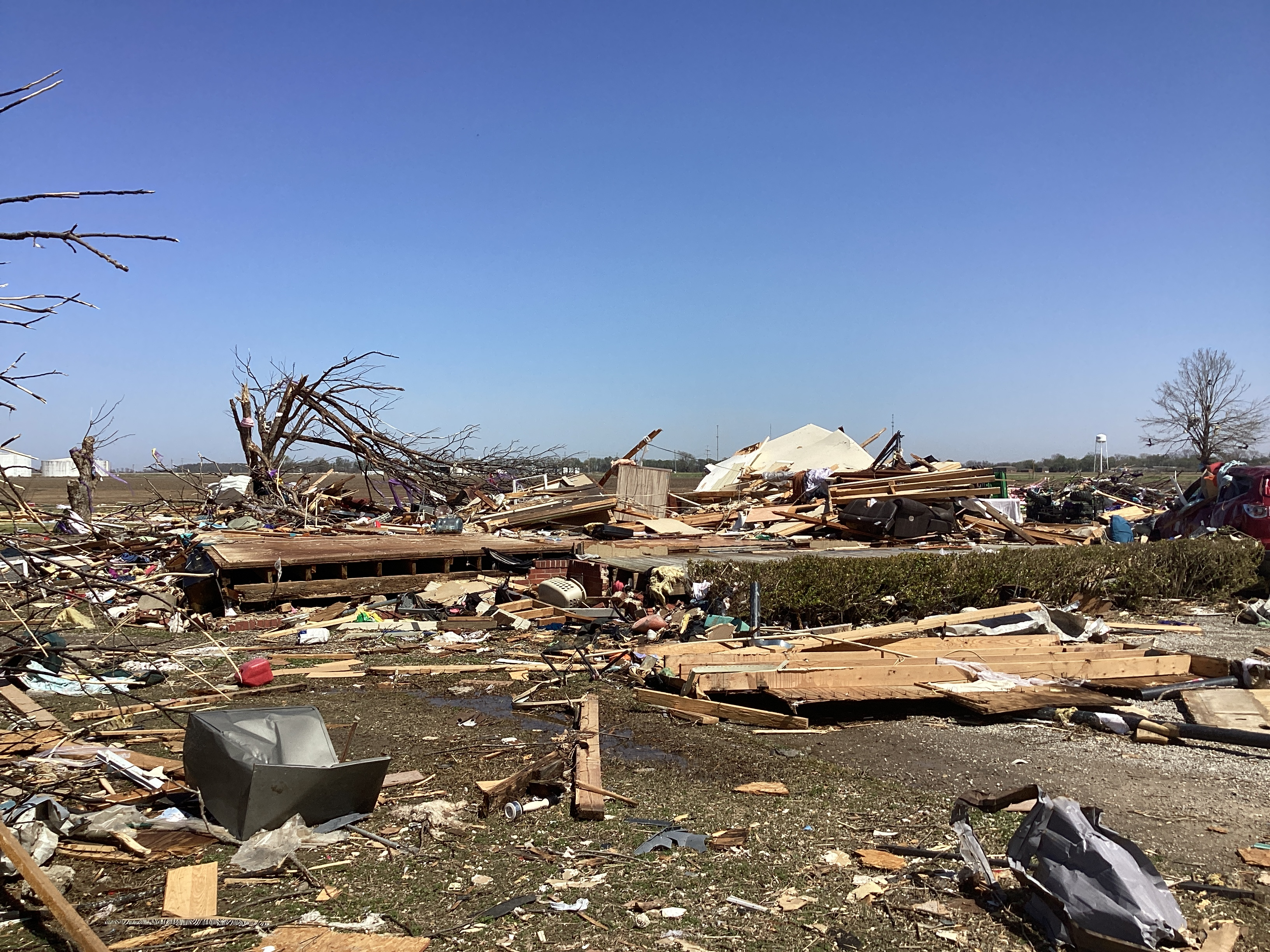
A home along Pinkins Road, completely leveled at low-end EF4 intensity

As it reached the southwestern outskirts of Rolling Fork at 8:05 pm CDT, the tornado moved directly through the Indian Bayou subdivision along Pinkins Road at low-end EF4 intensity, where every single home (about 15 in all) was leveled, and multiple were swept away. Most of the homes in the area were poorly constructed or were manufactured homes, though one frame home at this location was well built enough to earn a low-end EF4 rating. Violent contextual damage was also noted as large hardwood trees near the residences were severely debarked, some were stripped of their branches and stubbed, cars were thrown into fields and destroyed, and debris was strewn long distances. One car was rolled and bounced 100 yd (91 m) and left wrapped in utility lines, while another vehicle was thrown against a partially debarked tree. One person was severely injured in this area and died about four weeks later. Low-end EF4 damage continued as the tornado crossed MS 826, where a brick house was flattened, and many trees were debarked and left with only stubs of branches remaining. A large metal outbuilding was swept away at high-end EF2 intensity in this area as well. The tornado then weakened slightly, but remained intense, completely destroying a house near Oasis Drive at high-end EF3 intensity. The home was leveled, but it may have been struck by three nearby mobile homes that were thrown and destroyed.

=== Rolling Fork ===
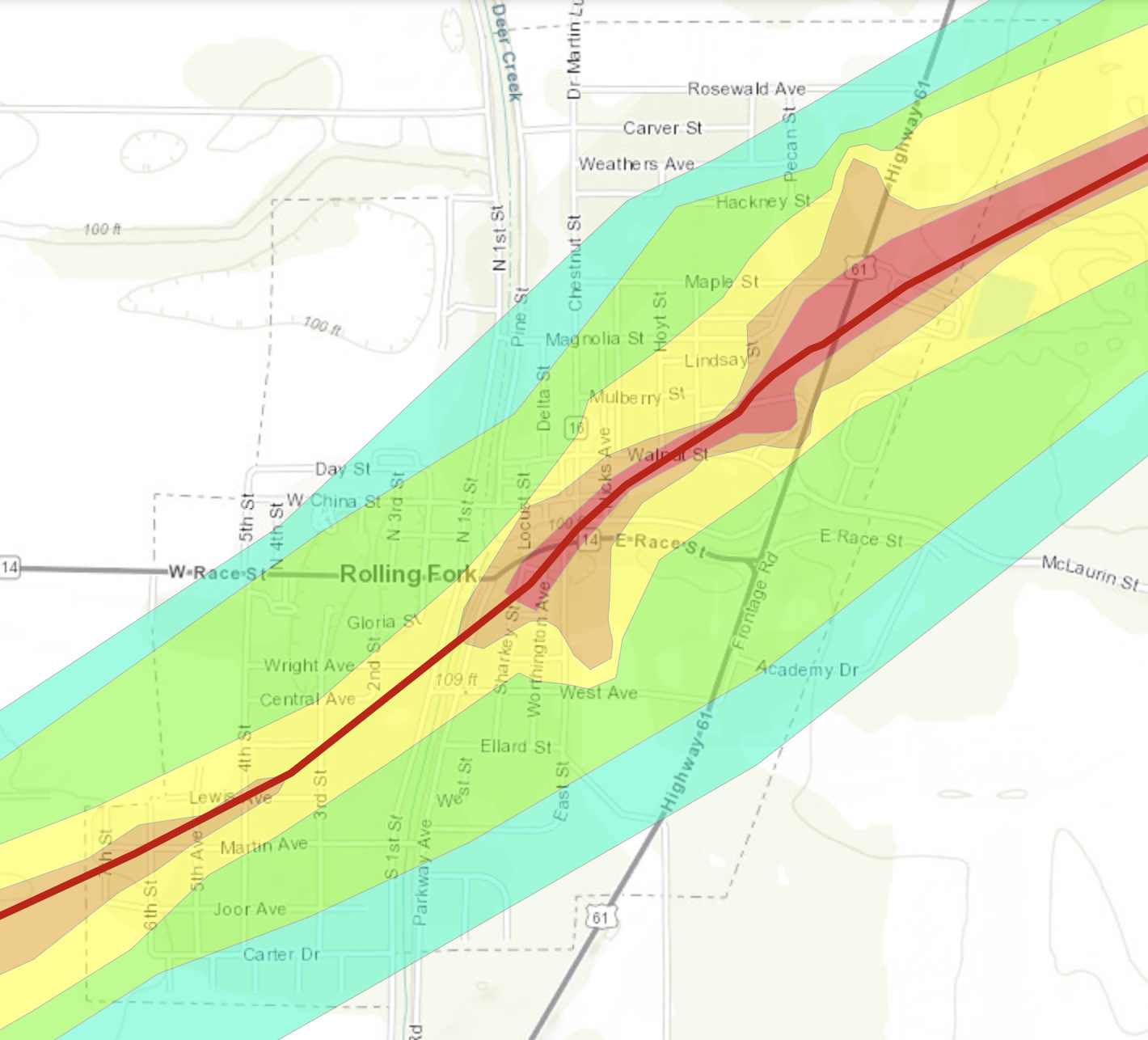
Track and intensity map of the tornado through Rolling Fork. Key EF0 65–85 mph EF1 86–110 mph EF2 111–135 mph EF3 136–165 mph EF4 166–200 mph ⎯ Center of the tornado

As the tornado entered Rolling Fork on the southwest side of town, it continued to produce up to high-end EF3 damage as it moved through residential areas, although it began to undergo a slow weakening trend as it continued northeastward. Many houses sustained major structural damage with roofs completely removed and exterior walls destroyed, and a few were leveled. Manufactured homes were obliterated, debris was scattered throughout the area, and the Sharkey Issaquena Hospital sustained damage to its exterior. A couple was killed near 7th Street by a large semi-truck that was thrown 70–80 yd (64–73 m) and slammed into their home and several other people were trapped in their homes and/or injured in this area as well. The tornado then dropped to EF2 strength but continued to produce major damage as it approached and crossed Deer Creek. The fire station, Rolling Fork Elementary School, South Delta High School, and a church sustained roof and exterior wall damage in this area.

As the tornado entered the downtown area at 8:07 pm CDT, it again rapidly intensified to EF4 strength again near the center of Rolling Fork as it reached MS 14 and Rolling Fork Creek. A home and a large brick duplex between Sharkey Street and Worthington Avenue were leveled and partially swept from their foundations, a masonic lodge was leveled, a convenience store was heavily damaged, several structures at an agricultural business were flattened, and two warehouses near the center of town were obliterated. The local library and animal shelter were destroyed, the Rolling Fork post office building had its roof removed, and the Rolling Fork City Hall and the Rolling Fork Police Department buildings sustained roof loss and some collapse of exterior walls. The Sharkey County Courthouse also sustained roof and exterior damage and had its cupola removed. Multiple older brick buildings in downtown Rolling Fork also sustained major structural damage. Several other well-built businesses and structures were leveled, with only piles of debris remaining; one of the structures had two tractor-trailers thrown into it. One of the town's water towers was toppled when flying debris compromised its base, leaving a crater where it impacted the ground. Water towers are not an official damage indicator on the Enhanced Fujita scale; however, the National Weather Service rated the damage done to the tower EF4 with no estimated wind speed. One person died in a mobile home that was destroyed on Worthington Avenue while another fatality occurred in another mobile home that was destroyed on Sidney Alexander Street north of Walnut Street.

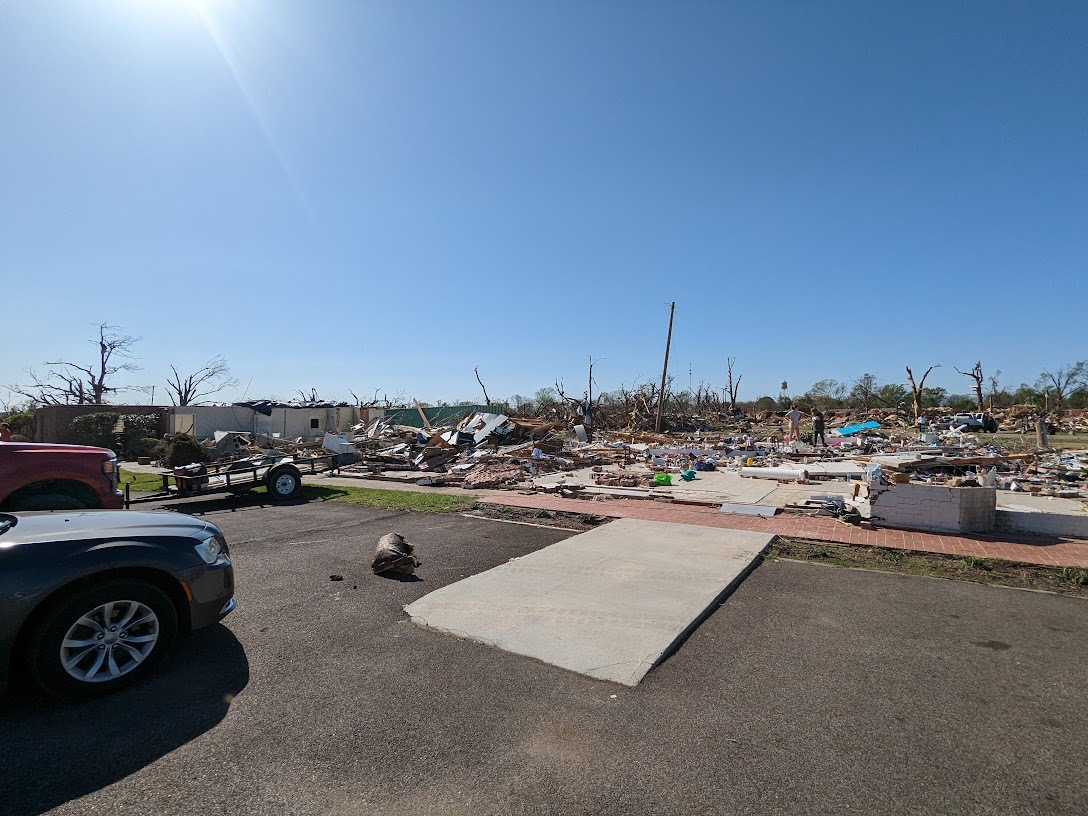
High-end EF4 damage to a flower shop along Walnut Street in Rolling Fork

The violent tornado then reached its peak intensity in the northeastern part of town as it approached US 61/MS 14. Along Walnut Street, the Green Apple Florist, a flower shop housed in a well-built brick building, was leveled at high-end EF4 strength, with its concrete foundation slab mostly swept clean of debris. The National Weather Service determined that winds up to 195 mph (314 km/h) would have been needed to cause the damage done to the flower shop. Several nearby homes along Mulberry Street were also leveled, with two of the homes receiving wind speed estimates of 190 mph (310 km/h) while numerous other homes were heavily damaged or destroyed. The tornado then impacted several businesses as it crossed US 61/MS 14, destroying all of them, including the Service Lumber Company, a Family Dollar store, El Mariachi Restaurant, and a Subway, with people being trapped by fallen debris and/or injured. Two people were killed at the Family Dollar, which was also impacted by 190 mph (310 km/h) winds, and a person traveling southbound in a truck on US 61/MS 14 died when the vehicle was thrown off the highway. Chuck's Dairy Bar had a pickup truck thrown into it and was destroyed, but several people survived at that location by taking shelter in the business's walk-in cooler, the only part of the building left intact after the tornado's passage; the nearby Chuck's motel buildings were also obliterated. The large tornado then struck a mobile home park on the eastern edge of town as it exited Rolling Fork, where all of 30 to 35 manufacturing homes were completely obliterated with debris being rowed 300–400 yd (270–370 m) downstream. Six people were killed here, representing the majority of the fatalities that occurred in this area. A Farm Bureau Insurance building and Britton Furniture were also destroyed in this area. In addition to the structural damage, many vehicles were thrown through the air and left badly mangled, and numerous large trees in and around Rolling Fork were denuded and debarked, with a few of them stripped clean of all bark. Radar from the National Weather Service indicated a debris signature that extended 4 mi (6.4 km) above Earth's surface as the tornado passed through Rolling Fork.

=== Ground scouring and extreme forest damage ===
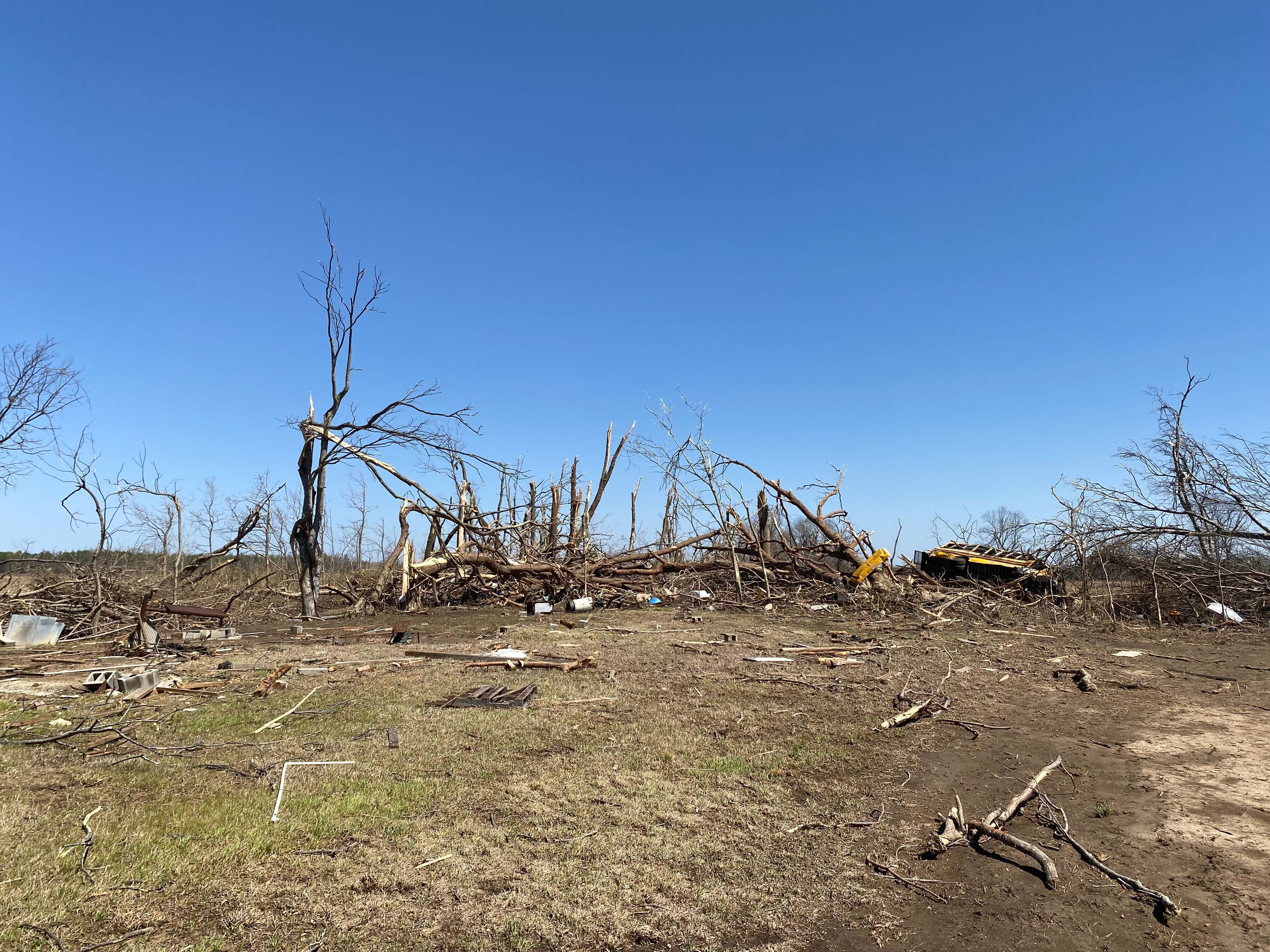
Low-end EF4 tree damage and a school bus that was thrown into the trees southeast of Anguilla

After exiting Rolling Fork, the tornado remained violent as it moved across several open fields, where severe ground scouring occurred, more trees were snapped or stubbed, and debris from the town was scattered. The tornado then weakened slightly but remained intense as it crossed Matthews Boulevard near a catfish farm at EF3 intensity. Several utility poles were snapped off at the base or pulled out of the ground, and some were left covered in up to 1–2 in (2.5–5.1 cm) of mud. A few of the missing power poles were thrown into nearby catfish ponds as well. The tornado then flipped a semi-trailer, snapped more trees, and damaged some more buildings before crossing the Big Sunflower River southeast of Anguilla and intensifying again to EF4 strength. Many hardwood trees were mangled or debarked, including some that were tossed or dragged a short distance. An unoccupied mobile home was obliterated and swept away with very little debris remaining, and a school bus on the property was tossed into trees. Numerous additional wooden power poles were snapped, and a few homes at the edge of the damage path had minor to moderate damage. Aerial imagery of this area also revealed ground scouring and cycloidal marks in open fields. A narrow path of wind-rowed granularized debris was noted between Dogwood Road and Linsey Road as tree pieces were reduced to the size of mulch. The tornado then abruptly weakened as it moved into a densely forested area, causing large amounts of EF2 tree damage. It crossed MS 14 east of Anguilla at 8:22 pm CDT, destroying a small, older frame home, rolling a mobile home into nearby trees, and snapping many trees and power poles. The tornado then intensified back to low-end EF3 strength, mowing down large swaths of trees as it approached the county line.

=== Midnight ===
Maintaining low-end EF3 strength, the tornado then crossed into Humphreys County at 8:25 pm CDT and continued northeastward, where a home suffered partial destruction of its roof and garage. A truck inside the garage was overturned while another was moved, and a nearby shop building was destroyed, with its metal structural beams bent. Several power poles in the area were snapped and thrown into a nearby field a couple hundred feet away as well. The tornado then briefly strengthened to high-end EF3 strength as it leveled a small brick home along Seven Mile Road and overturned a nearby grain loader. Another home had most of its roof removed, and part of a wall collapsed, with vehicles blown out of its garage. Some metal buildings were damaged or destroyed. Grain bins were heavily damaged in this area as well; debris, including a grain cart, was scattered for hundreds of yards into a field.

The tornado then weakened back to EF2 strength as it passed just northwest of the small community of Midnight at 8:31 pm CDT. A home and a few barns were destroyed, trees and power poles were snapped, a sign was blown over, and a metal building and a small brick building sustained roof damage. Shortly thereafter, at 8:32 pm CDT, another tornado warning was issued for areas downstream of the tornado emergency that had previously been issued. The tornado then regained EF3 intensity as it moved northeast along MS 149, causing EF2 to EF3 damage as it approached Silver City from the southwest. A mobile home was destroyed after being thrown 75 ft (23 m) into a nearby field, with only the porch being left behind. A portion of the roof was blown off a school, several homes suffered partial roof loss, and two metal buildings were destroyed, with large support beams bent and debris scattered across fields. This was the last area of EF3 damage produced by the tornado. Large areas of hardwood trees were snapped and uprooted, and multiple center pivot irrigation systems were flipped in this area as well.

=== Silver City, weakening, and dissipation ===
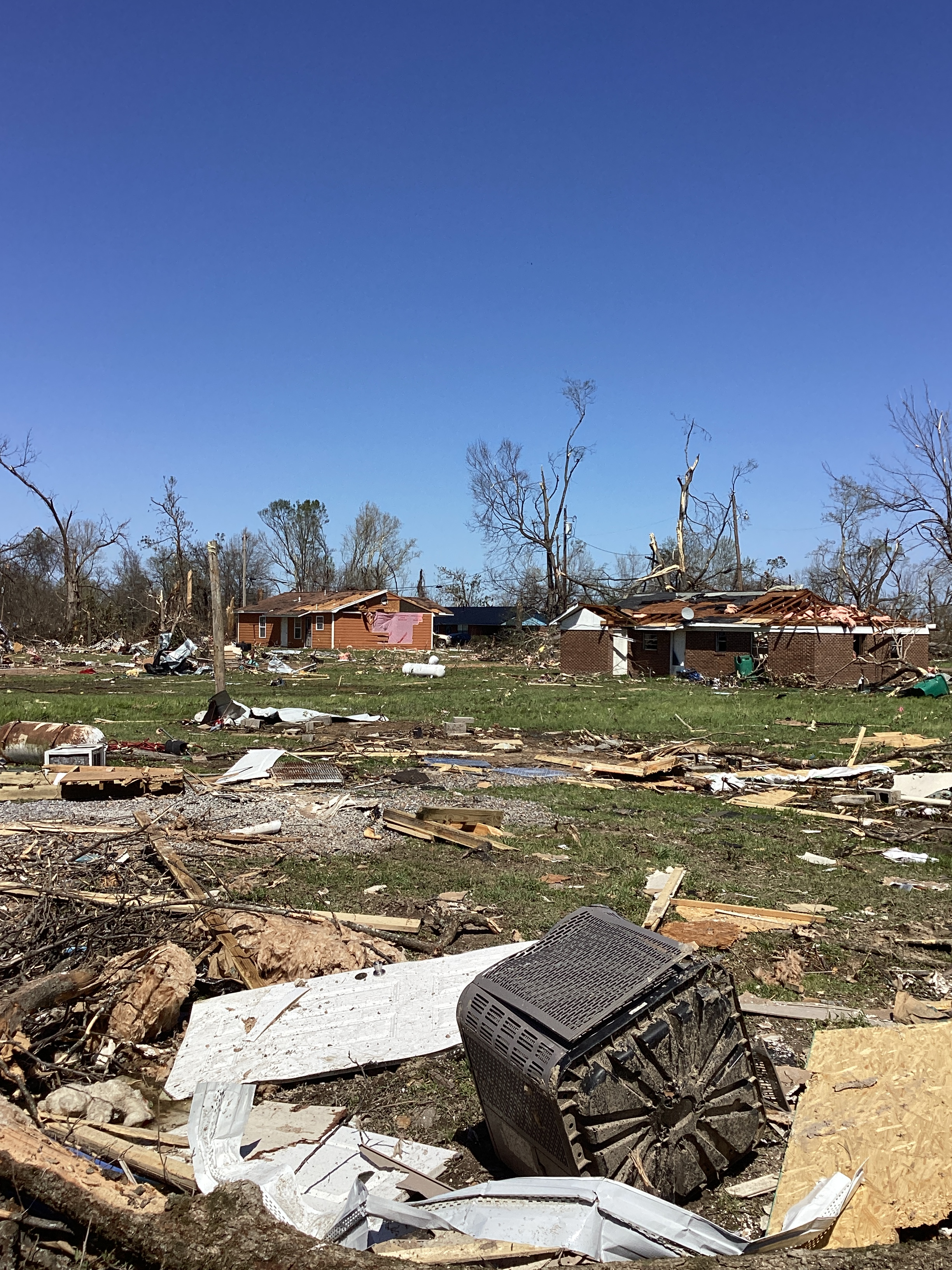
Widespread EF2 damage in Silver City

The tornado then weakened somewhat but continued causing major EF2 damage as it moved into Silver City at 8:37 pm CDT, where multiple apartment buildings on the western side of the town suffered heavy roof damage, including some that had portions of their roofs removed and one that had its walls partially collapsed; one person was killed at this location. Many homes throughout the town had extensive roof damage; some lost their roofs completely, and a few sustained the collapse of one or more exterior walls. Four manufactured homes were destroyed in the center of town as the tornado crossed US 49W, a church sustained roof damage, a large number of old hardwood trees were snapped or uprooted, and power lines were downed. One person was killed when a mobile home was thrown into their home, and a child was killed in a mobile home that was destroyed. Shortly after leaving the town, the newer tornado warning was also upgraded to a tornado emergency.

The tornado then weakened further and moved northeastward into rural forested areas, downing trees and causing roof and window damage to a few homes near and along MS 12 to the east of Belzoni at 8:49 pm CDT. Damage in this area was rated EF0 to EF1. It then moved into Holmes County at 8:52 pm CDT, where more trees were snapped and uprooted at EF1 strength as the tornado approached and crossed US 49E in the extent town of Oswego north of Tchula at 9 pm CDT, at which point the original tornado emergency expired, while the newer warning was downgraded to PDS tornado warning at 9:01 pm CDT. The tornado produced a final small area of significant damage, snapping or uprooting large tree trunks at EF2 intensity in the Morgan Brake National Wildlife Refuge. Beyond this point, the tornado weakened again and produced additional EF0 to EF1 damage as it overturned pivot irrigation systems, damaged trees, and flipped or destroyed grain bins. It dissipated after crossing Randle Road at 9:08 pm CDT.

In total, the tornado traveled 59.4 miles (95.6 km) in 71 minutes and reached a peak width of 1,320 yards (1,210 m). It destroyed or caused major damage to over 300 buildings and 182 acres of forest, killed 17 people, and injured 165 others. The tornado moved with an average forward speed of 50 miles per hour (80 km/h). The supercell would go on to produce two additional long-tracked, deadly EF3 tornadoes as it continued northeastward through Mississippi.

=== Possible EF5 intensity ===
In March 2024, Logan Poole, a meteorologist and damage surveyor with the National Weather Service in Jackson, Mississippi, gave an interview regarding the tornado and why it was rated EF4 rather than EF5. In the interview, Poole stated:

"So, what gave it the 195 mark? And, the best answer to that is what didn't give it the 200 mark...The Green Apple Florist, essentially a single family home that was modified to built to be a floral shop and it is slabbed to the ground and swept clean. Why not F5? Why not EF5? And two things really stuck out to us from the consensus on why not EF5. One was this building, even though it was extremely, extremely destroyed, I mean on its own, taken out of context, I think most people would agree this would be representative of an EF5 tornado; the damage to that building...If there had even been two of these side-by-side that had suffered the same fate, then maybe we could have had more confidence on that, but we didn't...But it was, to that point that we were very very close and this is probably about as close as you'll get across that threshold, without making it...A question we get a whole lot is like how can you be so sure that it was a five miles per hour from F5, but not quite there? And the answer to that is we aren't. What the EF-scale is, is a damage scale...Is it possible that it had winds that were stronger? Certainly."

— Logan Poole, National Weather Service in Jackson, Mississippi

Poole was referring to the flower shop on Walnut Street, which received a damage rating of high-end EF4 with winds of 195 mph (314 km/h) after it was leveled and partially swept away. According to the Damage Assessment Toolkit (DAT), the structure was built in the 1950s as a house with few interior walls and a low-sloping gabled roof. Gable roofs are more susceptible to wind damage because the walls on the non-sloping side (gabled side) act as a sail, catching wind rather than having a mechanism to direct wind over it. The building ended up being on the southeast side of the track of the tornado, with the southeast-facing gable wall being directly in line with the inflow going into the storm. Thus, despite being over 300 ft (91 m) from the center of the tornado, which at the time was crossing Mulberry Street, the structure was not able to withstand the massive amount of wind pressure and was violently destroyed. The neighboring building, which was a small salon, also had a gable roof, albeit at a much steeper angle. It was only leveled and not swept away, and received a high-end EF3 rating with winds of 165 mph (266 km/h). Additionally, the building next to that one, which was a law office with a more wind-resistant hip roof, had exterior walls knocked down and its roof removed, but was otherwise left standing; this damage received an EF3 rating with winds of 144 mph (232 km/h). As a result of these limiting factors, there was not enough confidence in upgrading the tornado to EF5.

On January 23, 2025, Anthony W. Lyza with the National Severe Storms Laboratory along with Harold E. Brooks and Makenzie J. Kroca with the University of Oklahoma’s School of Meteorology published a paper to the American Meteorological Society, where they stated the Rolling Fork tornado was an "EF5 candidate" at the floral shop. The paper opined that the EF5 starting wind speed should be 190 mph (310 km/h) instead of 201 mph (323 km/h).

== Aftermath ==
Although the initial warning for Rolling Fork was issued roughly ten minutes before the tornado struck the town, many residents stated that they did not receive any warning due to the cell service being down, the tornado sirens not going off, and the fast speed of the tornado. As a result, the tornado's arrival caught many people off guard with some of them not even knowing what had happened. Additionally, there are no public shelters in the town nor are there any in the rest of the Sharkey County and the surrounding counties. Thus, the residents who somehow did receive a warning were forced to take shelter within their homes and mobile homes, which proved to be inadequate.

Preliminary information from the National Weather Service in Jackson, Mississippi indicated that over 78% of the city of Rolling Fork and over 96% of Silver City sustained some level of damage from the tornado, with at least 300 homes sustaining damage in Rolling Fork. Rolling Fork's funeral director and mayor, Eldridge Walker, said on March 27 that search-and-rescue efforts were "pretty close" to finished and authorities believed that everyone had been accounted for. Following major damage to the Sharkey Issaquena Community Hospital and the Delta Health Center, both based in Rolling Fork, the University of Mississippi Medical Center partnered with state agencies to establish a temporary field hospital at the town's National Guard Armory. The Mississippi Emergency Management Agency (MEMA) contracted with the Red Cross to provide survivors with meals and lodging in hotel rooms for up to six months. By April 11, Mayor Walker said that 500 people—approximately a third of the town's population—remained displaced. More than 200 remained displaced in mid-August. To dispose of debris and waste from the tornado's damage, Sharkey County established a burn site on the town's outskirts. On April 10 alone, 260 truckloads of debris made the trip to the burn site. Influencer and YouTuber Ryan Hall, Y'all raised $120,000 through social media to give generators out after the storm.

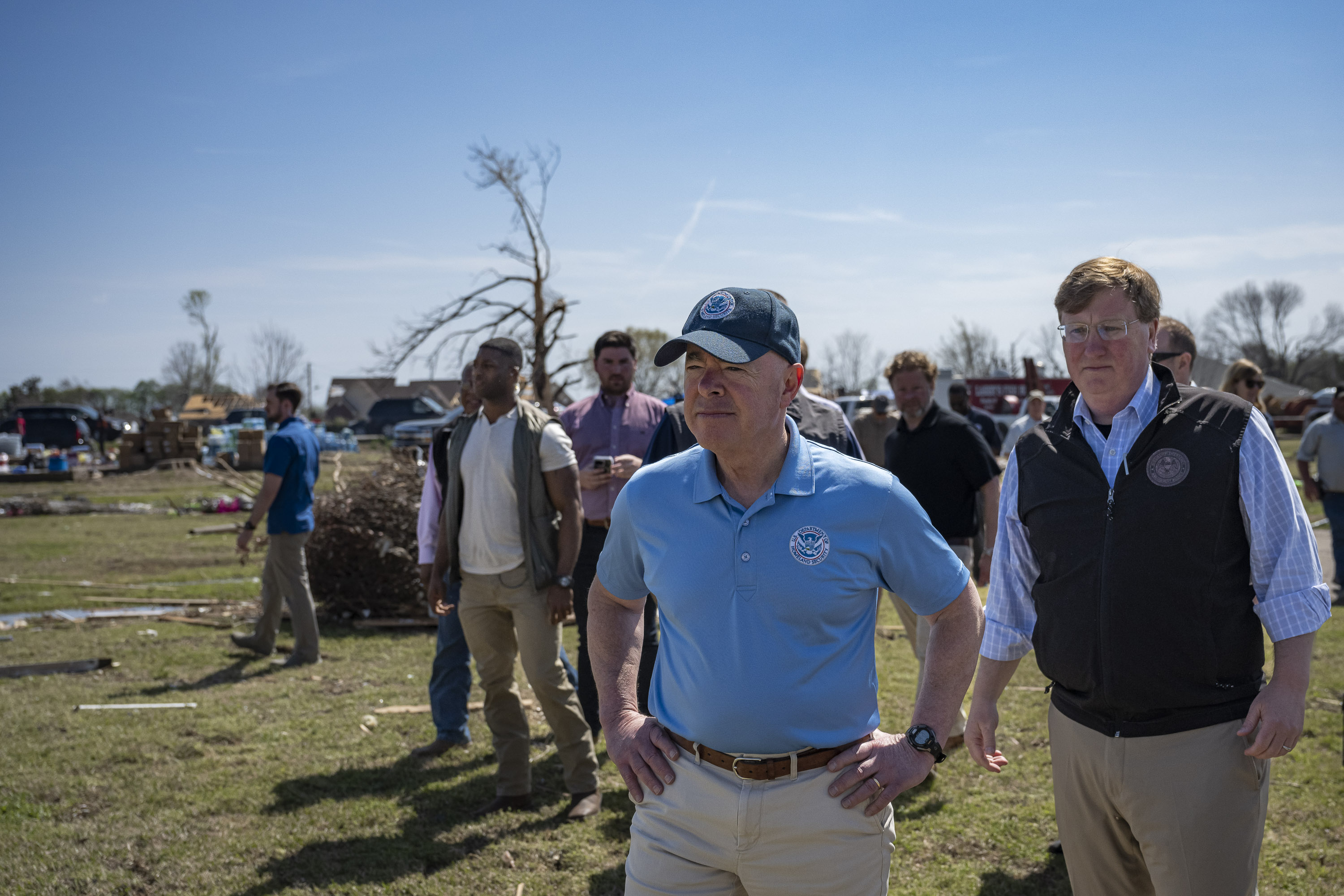
Secretary Alejandro Mayorkas and Governor Reeves touring the damage in Rolling Fork on March 26

The Mississippi Insurance Department stated that insured losses from the tornado were near $100 million (2023 USD), with uninsured losses likely even higher.

=== Political response ===
Both state and national politicians responded to the devastation in Mississippi. On March 25, Governor of Mississippi Tate Reeves declared a state of emergency in Sharkey, Humphreys, Carroll, and Monroe counties. Governor Reeves's request for a major disaster declaration was granted by President Joe Biden on March 26. President Biden visited Rolling Fork on March 31 and announced that the federal government would fully cover the cost of the cleanup. The Mississippi state legislature also later approved approximately $18.5 million in tornado relief funds.

== See also ==
- Weather of 2023
- List of North American tornadoes and tornado outbreaks
- List of F4 and EF4 tornadoes
  - List of F4 and EF4 tornadoes (2020–present)
- List of United States tornadoes in March 2023
- List of case studies on tornadoes (2020–present)
- 2010 Yazoo City tornado – A massive, long-track and deadly EF4 tornado that occurred in the same region
