= Henry Weathers High School =

Coordinates: 32.9138°N 90.8745°W

Henry Weathers High School was a high school in Sharkey County, Mississippi, United States, near Rolling Fork. It admitted students from both Sharkey and Issaquena counties.

Principal O. E. Jordan disallowed students from wearing Student Nonviolent Coordinating Committee (SNCC) pins in 1965; the students had received them from the Mississippi Student Union. Jordan avoided challenging white domination of politics even though he had sought to improve the education of African-Americans. Students responded by launching a boycott against the school.

In 1977 the school had 399 students. That year another boycott occurred, with only three students attending classes.
