= Bellewood, Mississippi =

Unincorporated community in Mississippi, United States

- Unincorporated community
- Location within Mississippi Location within the United States
- Coordinates: 33°13′54″N 90°33′33″W
- Country: United States
- State: Mississippi
- County: Humphreys
- Elevation: 112 ft (34 m)
- Time zone: UTC-6 (Central (CST))
  - Summer (DST): UTC-5 (CDT)
- ZIP code: 38754
- Area code: 662
- GNIS feature ID: 666794

Bellewood is an unincorporated community located in Humphreys County, Mississippi. Bellewood is approximately 3 miles (4.8 km) southeast of Isola and approximately 5 miles (8.0 km) northwest of Belzoni along Highway 49 West.

Bellewood is located on the former Illinois Central Railroad and was once home to a general store, grocery store, and sawmill.

A post office operated under the name Bellewood from 1902 to 1925.

Prior to the creation of Humphreys County, Bellewood was located in Washington County.
