= James Robinson Christenberry =

20th century State legislator in Mississippi, USA

Member of the Mississippi State Senate from the 20th district
- In office January 1960 – January 1964
- Preceded by: W. M. Cole
- Succeeded by: Herman B. DeCell

Personal details
- Born: April 19, 1927 Shreveport, Louisiana, U.S.
- Died: August 27, 1973 (aged 46)
- Party: Democratic

James Robinson Christenberry (April 19, 1926 - August 27, 1973) was a lawyer, farmer, and state legislator in Mississippi. He served in the Mississippi State Senate, representing the 20th District, from 1960 to 1964.

== Biography ==
James Robinson Christenberry was born on April 19, 1926, in Shreveport. He was a lawyer and farmer who lived in Rolling Fork, Mississippi.

On August 25, 1959, Christenberry ran in the Democratic primary to represent the 20th District, comprising Sharkey and Issaquena Counties, in the Mississippi State Senate for the term spanning from 1960 to 1964. In the primary, Christenberry defeated Sharkey County sheriff Andy Crawford, receiving 835 votes compared to Crawford's 625 votes, and subsequently served one term. During his term, Christenberry was the Chairman of the Military Affairs Committee and the Vice Chairman of the Elections Committee. He also served on other committees including: Agriculture; Game & Fish; Highways; Insurance; Judiciary; and the Levees & Drainage committee.

He gave a colorful description of how white Mississippians viewed the Kennedy family. Christenberry died of cancer on August 27, 1973. He was survived by his widow, his parents, and his grandmother.
