= National Register of Historic Places listings in Humphreys County, Mississippi =

Location of Humphreys County in Mississippi

This is a list of the National Register of Historic Places listings in Humphreys County, Mississippi.

This is intended to be a complete list of the properties and districts on the National Register of Historic Places in Humphreys County, Mississippi, United States. Latitude and longitude coordinates are provided for many National Register properties and districts; these locations may be seen together in a map.

There are 6 properties and districts listed on the National Register in the county.

This National Park Service list is complete through NPS recent listings posted October 30, 2026.

== Current listings ==
	Name on the Register	Image	Date listed	Location	City or town	Description
1	Belzoni Mound (22HU500)		April 13, 1988 (#88000305)	Southeastern quarter of the northwestern quarter of Section 2, Township 15 North, Range 3 West; 33°10′39″N 90°28′50″W	Belzoni	
2	Humphreys County Courthouse	Humphreys County Courthouse	January 15, 2014 (#13001082)	102 Castleman St. 33°10′32″N 90°29′17″W	Belzoni	
3	Jaketown Site	Jaketown Site	June 19, 1973 (#73001017)	Western side of Mississippi Highway 7, approximately 4 miles north of Belzoni; 33°14′12″N 90°29′13″W	Belzoni	
4	Midnight Mound Site (22HU509)		April 25, 1986 (#86000870)	Northwestern quarter of the southeastern quarter of Section 14, Township 14 North, Range 4 West; 33°03′20″N 90°34′42″W	Midnight	
5	Parker-Summerfield Mound Archeological Site		March 21, 1997 (#97000251)	Northeastern quarter of the southeastern quarter of Section 18, Township 14 North, Range 4 West; 33°03′27″N 90°38′38″W	Midnight	
6	Slate Archeological Site	Slate Archeological Site	July 8, 1982 (#82003102)	Address restricted	Lake City	

== See also ==
- List of National Historic Landmarks in Mississippi
- National Register of Historic Places listings in Mississippi
