= Christenberry =

Christenberry is a surname. Notable people with the surname include:

- Herbert William Christenberry (1897–1975), American judge
- James Robinson Christenberry (1926–1973), American lawyer, farmer, and politician
- Robert K. Christenberry (1899–1973), American businessman and political figure
- William Christenberry (1936–2016), American photographer, painter, sculptor, and teacher

== See also ==
- Christenberry Fieldhouse
