= John B. Nixon =

American murderer (1928–2005)

- Born: April 1, 1928; Midnight, Mississippi, U.S.
- Died: December 14, 2005 (aged 77); Mississippi State Penitentiary, Mississippi, U.S.
- Status: Executed by lethal injection
- Convictions: Capital murder Rape
- Penalty: Death (March 26, 1986)

Details
- Victims: Virginia Tucker, 45
- Date: January 22, 1985
- Country: United States
- State: Mississippi
- Date apprehended: November 4, 1985

John B. Nixon Sr. (April 1, 1928 – December 14, 2005) was an American convicted murderer. He was convicted of the January 22, 1985 murder-for-hire of Virginia Tucker in Rankin County, Mississippi. Born in Midnight in Humphreys County, Mississippi, he was executed in 2005 by the State of Mississippi.

At 77 years old, Nixon, who was a World War II veteran, was the oldest person executed since 1976 and, according to the Espy Files compiled by M. Watt Espy, the oldest person executed in the United States since Joe Lee in Virginia at the age of 83 on April 21, 1916. Nixon's record was surpassed by Walter Moody, who was executed on April 19, 2018, at the age of 83.

== Murder ==
On January 22, 1985, Nixon, his son, Henry Nixon, and Gilbert Jimenez arrived at the home of Thomas and Virginia Tucker. Upon entering the house, Nixon pulled out a .22 caliber pistol and said, "I brought y'all something."

Thomas Tucker, who had married his wife six months earlier (three months after her divorce was finalized), immediately surmised that the men had been hired by his wife's former husband, Elster Joseph Ponthieux. Tucker offered Nixon money to spare their lives, but Nixon replied, "[t]hat's not what I'm after. The deal's already been made."

Nixon and one of his associates then shot at Tucker, who managed to escape despite being hit in the side. Tucker made his way to his nearby place of work and asked a co-worker to check on his wife. Meanwhile, Nixon took the gun back from his associate, held the gun one inch behind Virginia Tucker's ear and fired a shot into her head. Nixon and his associates fled.

Tucker's wife was soon discovered by his co-worker and was taken to the hospital where she died the next day. Nixon was arrested after Tucker identified him in a lineup.

== Trial and appeals ==
Nixon was convicted by a jury of capital murder after a three-day trial and sentenced to death on March 26, 1986. The jury found that the aggravating circumstances of the murder being for hire were especially heinous, atrocious, and cruel, and that Nixon had previously been convicted of a felony involving the use or threat of violence to a person. In 1958, Nixon pleaded guilty to statutory rape in Texas and was sentenced to 15 years in prison.

The ex-husband who had hired Nixon to perform the killing received a life sentence and two of Nixon's sons and a friend also were convicted in the killing.

During his appeals, Nixon argued that his trial counsel was over-burdened and could not represent him effectively. At the time of the trial, they were preparing for another capital case and did not accept an offer from the judge to give them more time to prepare for the penalty phase of the case. The trial counsel even assumed that Nixon would not be convicted of capital murder.

There were several aspects of Nixon's life that were not brought to the attention of the jury. He had twice saved people from death — once a drowning boy in a flooded irrigation ditch and the other a woman from a burning plane crash at Houston International Airport (now William P. Hobby Airport) in 1966. He had volunteered to serve in the United States Navy during World War II and received an honorable discharge. He later enlisted in the United States Army, getting a hardship discharge after his father abandoned his mother. Nixon did not tell his lawyers any of this and they had to discover it through their own private investigations.

He and his mother were physically abused by his father. A psychiatrist named Gerald O'Brien diagnosed Nixon with a severe passive-aggressive personality disorder. O'Brien also said that such a disorder would not have stopped Nixon from knowing the difference between right and wrong at the time of the murder.

The prosecution claimed that Nixon was convicted of a violent or forceful rape, when he had in fact pleaded guilty to the statutory rape of Mary Jo Polk in 1958 in Texas and received a 15-year sentence. In a federal court, after an appeal by Nixon, the state prosecutors admitted that it could not ethically use the statutory rape charge as evidence of a prior violent felony, but the court held that error was harmless, as the jury found two other aggravating circumstances in the penalty phase.

Nixon's lawyers argued that since he was already 77, he would be little danger to society and should be able to live out the rest of his days in prison, where he had been for the last 19 years. During those two decades, Nixon had his appeals turned down by the Supreme Court of Mississippi, United States district courts, the Court of Appeals for the Fifth Circuit, and the Supreme Court of the United States.

Governor of Mississippi Haley Barbour denied clemency for Nixon on December 10, 2005. "[J]ustice in this case has been delayed for more than 20 years," Barbour said in a statement after denying clemency. "... [A] delay of this length greatly reduces the deterrent effect of the death penalty."

== Execution ==
Nixon was pronounced dead at 6:25 p.m. Central Standard Time Zone on December 14, 2005, after his execution by lethal injection at the Mississippi State Penitentiary. It was the seventh execution by the state of Mississippi since the Gregg v. Georgia decision and the 1004th overall in the United States.

Prison officials described Nixon as being upbeat on the day of his execution, but his mood turned somber around 4 p.m. as the time of the execution neared.

While strapped to the gurney, Nixon said that:

I did not kill Virginia Tucker. I know within my heart, and it hurts to acknowledge, that it was a son of mine and a Spanish friend and another man from Jackson.

For his last meal, Nixon requested a well-done T-bone steak, buttered asparagus spears, a baked potato with sour cream, peach pie, vanilla ice cream, and sweet tea.

Before his execution, Nixon released a statement through his attorneys, taken from a folksong titled "Katie Cruel":

Oh that I was where I would be,
Then would I be where I am not.
Here am I where I must be,
go where I would I can not.

== See also ==
- List of people executed in Mississippi
- List of people executed in the United States in 2005
