= Deovolente, Mississippi =

Unincorporated community in Mississippi, United States

- Unincorporated community
- Location within Mississippi Location within the United States
- Coordinates: 33°13′09″N 90°27′00″W
- Country: United States
- State: Mississippi
- County: Humphreys
- Elevation: 112 ft (34 m)
- Time zone: UTC-6 (Central (CST))
  - Summer (DST): UTC-5 (CDT)
- ZIP code: 39038
- Area code: 662
- GNIS feature ID: 691812

Deovolente is an unincorporated community located in Humphreys County, Mississippi. Deovolente is approximately 3 miles (4.8 km) northeast of Belzoni.

== History ==
The name Deovolente comes from the Latin phrase "Deo volente", which means God willing. The community was founded by African-Americans.

The Deovolente Museum, which contains artifacts from the community's history, is housed in a room at O.M. McNair Upper Elementary School in Belzoni.

A post office operated under the name Deovolante from 1878 to 1928.

Prior to the creation of Humphreys County, Deovolente was located in Washington County.

== Notable person ==
- Alyce Clarke, member of the Mississippi House of Representatives
