= The Enterprise-Tocsin =

Newspaper from Mississippi

- Type: Weekly newspaper
- Founded: 1888
- Headquarters: 114 Main St., Indianola, MS 38751
- ISSN: 2831-6762 (print); 2831-6770 (web)
- OCLC number: 15273338
- Website: enterprise-tocsin.com

The Enterprise-Tocsin is a newspaper in the U.S. state of Mississippi. The newspaper offices are in Indianola. The newspaper is distributed in Sunflower County and sections of northern Humphreys County. It is published weekly, on each Friday.
