= Althea Brown Edmiston =

American Presbyterian missionary

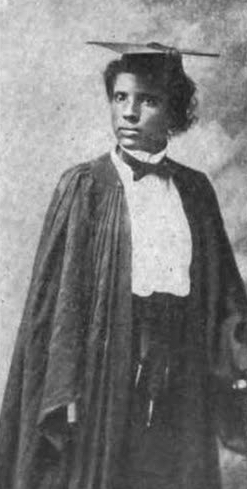
- Althea M. Brown, from a 1902 publication.
- Born: Althea Maria Brown; December 17, 1874; Russellville, Alabama
- Died: June 10, 1937 (aged 62); Mutoto, Belgian Congo
- Occupation: Christian missionary
- Notable work: first dictionary of the Bushong language

Althea Maria Brown Edmiston (December 17, 1874 – June 10, 1937) was an African-American teacher and Presbyterian missionary, working in the Belgian Congo for more than thirty years. She compiled the first dictionary and grammar for Bushong, the language of the Kuba Kingdom.

== Early life ==
Althea Maria Brown was born in Russellville, Alabama, one of the ten children of Robert Brown and Mary Suggs Brown. Her parents were emancipated from slavery as young adults. She was raised on her father's farm near Rolling Fork, Mississippi. She attended Fisk University, beginning in 1892 and finishing her studies in 1901. She was the only woman speaker at the Fisk commencement in 1901. She underwent further training for mission work at the Chicago Training School for City and Foreign Missions.

== Career ==
In her youth, Brown lived and worked as a nurse in the household of a white family for two years. While she was a college student, she earned money as a cook, as a hairdresser, and as a summer school teacher. She taught at a one-room school in Pikeville, Tennessee. In 1901, she was commissioned as a missionary by the Executive Committee of Foreign Missions of the Southern Presbyterian Church. She sailed for the Belgian Congo in August 1902.

In the Congo she worked at the Ibanche mission station run by William Henry Sheppard, an African-American missionary. She taught school and Sunday school, and was matron of the girls' residence. Their work was relocated to Luebo in 1904, after an uprising against the missionaries. Althea Brown Edmiston worked at other stations, including Bulape and Mutoto, with her husband. She reported on her work in missionary publications and to the Fisk University community. In 1920-1921 she was on furlough in the United States, and gave a commencement address at her alma mater, Fisk University: "May it not be that some of you will offer yourselves to answer the call?" she suggested of a life in mission work. "Africa needs the very best trained men and women that can be found." She was back in the United States again in 1924-1925 for medical care, and in 1935 to speak at the Missionary Conference of Negro Women in Indianapolis that year.

Despite having no specialized linguistic training, Althea Brown Edmiston spent years creating the first dictionary and grammar of the local Bushong language, eventually published as Grammar and Dictionary of the Bushonga or Bakuba Language as Spoken by the Bushonga or Bakuba Tribe Who Dwell in the Upper Kasai District, Belgian Congo, Central Africa in 1932. She also translated educational and liturgical materials into Bushong and Tshiluba, and recorded Kuba folklore, personally creating a small library of texts for her students to read in their own language.

== Personal life and legacy ==
Althea Brown married Alonzo Edmiston, a fellow African-American missionary, in 1905. They had two sons, Sherman and Alonzo, both born in the Congo region. Althea Brown Edmiston died in 1937, aged 62 years, in Mutoto, after several years with malaria and sleeping sickness.

In Edmiston's memory, the Presbyterian Church in the United States established the Althea Brown Edmiston Memorial Fund in 1939. A biography of Edmiston, A Life for the Congo: The Story of Althea Brown Edmiston by Julia Lake Kellersberger, was published in 1947. In 1975, Fisk University mounted an exhibit recalling Althea Brown Edmiston's life and work. The Edmiston Papers are archived at the Presbyterian Historical Society. Another collection of her papers is held at Emory University. Her story is still repeated in Presbyterian publications as an example of the work of African-American women in mission, and she is often mentioned among the notable alumni of Fisk University.
