= List of Mississippi locations by per capita income =

Mississippi is the poorest state in the United States of America, with a per capita income of $20,670 (2012).

== Mississippi counties ranked by per capita income ==
Note: Data is from the 2010 United States Census Data and the 2006-2010 American Community Survey 5-Year Estimates.

Rank	County	Per capita income	Median household income	Population	Number of households
1	Madison	$32,223	$59,730	98,468	35,297
	United States	$27,915	$52,762	313,914,040	114,761,359
2	Rankin	$27,183	$56,159	145,165	52,539
3	Lamar	$27,399	$50,075	57,786	21,237
4	DeSoto	$25,065	$59,734	166,234	56,641
5	Jackson	$23,547	$49,620	140,298	50,185
6	Harrison	$23,111	$44,550	194,029	69,384
7	Warren	$22,079	$40,404	48,773	18,941
8	Hancock	$21,935	$44,494	43,929	17,380
9	Lee	$21,831	$39,049	82,910	32,086
10	Stone	$21,691	$43,728	17,786	6,165
11	Franklin	$21,583	$33,324	8,118	3,211
12	Lowndes	$21,273	$37,607	59,779	23,487
13	Lafayette	$21,267	$39,080	47,351	18,356
14	Hinds	$20,676	$39,215	245,285	91,351
15	Lincoln	$20,620	$38,405	34,869	13,296
16	Lauderdale	$20,116	$33,926	80,261	31,090
17	Pearl River	$20,014	$40,038	55,834	20,816
	Mississippi	$19,977	$37,881	2,967,297	1,115,768
18	Grenada	$19,701	$32,901	21,906	8,779
19	George	$19,452	$45,492	22,578	7,982
20	Oktibbeha	$19,356	$30,320	47,671	18,820
21	Forrest	$19,272	$34,448	74,934	28,746
22	Lawrence	$19,142	$35,593	12,929	5,078
23	Monroe	$18,884	$35,685	36,989	14,485
24	Smith	$18,686	$37,176	16,491	6,221
25	Jones	$18,632	$36,017	67,761	25,247
26	Itawamba	$18,517	$37,588	23,401	8,881
27	Simpson	$18,397	$36,739	27,503	10,330
28	Tate	$18,318	$41,102	28,886	10,035
29	Jasper	$18,268	$30,177	17,062	6,798
30	Perry	$18,238	$38,887	12,250	4,674
31	Alcorn	$17,954	$32,342	37,057	15,039
32	Union	$17,945	$35,928	27,134	10,317
33	Webster	$17,888	$34,107	10,253	4,060
34	Pontotoc	$17,820	$38,420	29,957	11,172
35	Covington	$17,713	$32,456	19,568	7,430
36	Attala	$17,659	$28,508	19,564	7,619
37	Pike	$17,620	$30,779	40,404	15,370
38	Neshoba	$17,609	$34,905	29,676	10,856
39	Clay	$17,604	$31,727	20,634	8,029
40	Marion	$17,549	$31,332	27,088	10,135
41	Adams	$17,473	$27,096	32,297	12,643
42	Copiah	$17,473	$36,637	29,449	10,708
43	Winston	$17,244	$30,738	19,198	7,494
44	Wayne	$17,099	$31,081	20,747	8,104
45	Prentiss	$17,068	$31,262	25,276	9,812
46	Tishomingo	$17,017	$30,211	19,593	8,148
47	Amite	$16,861	$27,615	13,131	5,351
48	Marshall	$16,825	$34,183	37,144	13,369
49	Newton	$16,727	$36,154	21,720	8,214
50	Yalobusha	$16,623	$29,911	12,678	5,166
51	Scott	$16,608	$35,765	28,264	10,248
52	Montgomery	$16,584	$31,488	10,925	4,438
53	Choctaw	$16,545	$30,994	8,547	3,446
54	Clarke	$16,467	$29,103	16,732	6,733
55	Tippah	$16,365	$32,109	22,232	8,597
56	Walthall	$16,157	$33,054	15,443	5,888
57	Bolivar	$16,051	$26,005	34,145	12,727
58	Carroll	$16,025	$29,290	10,597	4,188
59	Panola	$15,987	$34,030	34,707	12,839
60	Chickasaw	$15,985	$30,092	17,392	6,639
61	Washington	$15,946	$27,797	51,137	18,936
62	Tunica	$15,711	$29,994	10,778	3,927
63	Coahoma	$15,687	$24,726	26,151	9,461
64	Calhoun	$15,183	$28,484	14,962	5,988
65	Jefferson Davis	$15,120	$25,986	12,487	4,977
66	Benton	$14,998	$29,202	8,729	3,404
67	Leake	$14,617	$31,986	23,805	8,272
68	Yazoo	$14,339	$27,356	28,065	8,860
69	Wilkinson	$14,333	$28,066	9,878	3,455
70	Sharkey	$14,322	$30,129	4,916	1,834
71	Greene	$14,064	$40,828	14,400	4,306
72	Humphreys	$13,282	$25,131	9,375	3,373
73	Quitman	$13,080	$24,169	8,223	3,058
74	Leflore	$12,957	$22,020	32,317	11,577
75	Kemper	$12,903	$25,649	10,456	3,920
76	Noxubee	$12,759	$22,178	11,545	4,305
77	Tallahatchie	$12,687	$24,668	15,378	4,856
78	Claiborne	$12,571	$24,150	9,604	3,440
79	Jefferson	$12,534	$24,304	7,726	2,929
80	Sunflower	$11,993	$25,012	29,450	8,822
81	Issaquena	$11,810	$21,360	1,406	472
82	Holmes	$11,585	$21,375	19,198	6,926
