= Lodi, Humphreys County, Mississippi =

Unincorporated community in Mississippi, United States

- Unincorporated community
- Location within Mississippi Location within the United States
- Coordinates: 33°02′47″N 90°24′36″W
- Country: United States
- State: Mississippi
- County: Humphreys
- Elevation: 108 ft (33 m)
- Time zone: UTC-6 (Central (CST))
  - Summer (DST): UTC-5 (CDT)
- Area code: 662
- GNIS feature ID: 692012

Lodi is an unincorporated community in Humphreys County, Mississippi, United States.
