= Herman B. DeCell =

Mississippi politician

Herman Brister DeCell (1924–1986) was a lawyer and politician in Mississippi. He served in the Mississippi Senate from 1959 to 1979.

He was born in Yazoo City and lived there as an adult. He was a partner at Henry, Barbour, DeCell and Bridgforth.

He wrote an article about federal crop insurance.

He was endorsed by the Holmes County Herald in 1975. He was appointed to the Mississippi State Sovereignty Commission, a state agency established to fight for segregation after the U.S. Supreme Court Brown vs. Board of Education decision requiring school integration.

He gave an oral interview in 1977.
