= W. M. Cole =

American politician (1888–1958)

Wade Monroe Cole (February 3, 1888 – August 15, 1958) was a politician in Mississippi. He served in the Mississippi House of Representatives and the Mississippi Senate. He also served as a mayor.

Cole was born in Ruth, Mississippi on February 3, 1888.

He was a farmer. He belonged to the Baptist Church. He lived in Mayersville in Issaquena County. He served in the Mississippi House from 1944 until 1952.

He represented Issaquena County and Sharkey County in 1949.

He died on August 15, 1958.
