= Isola, Mississippi =

- Town
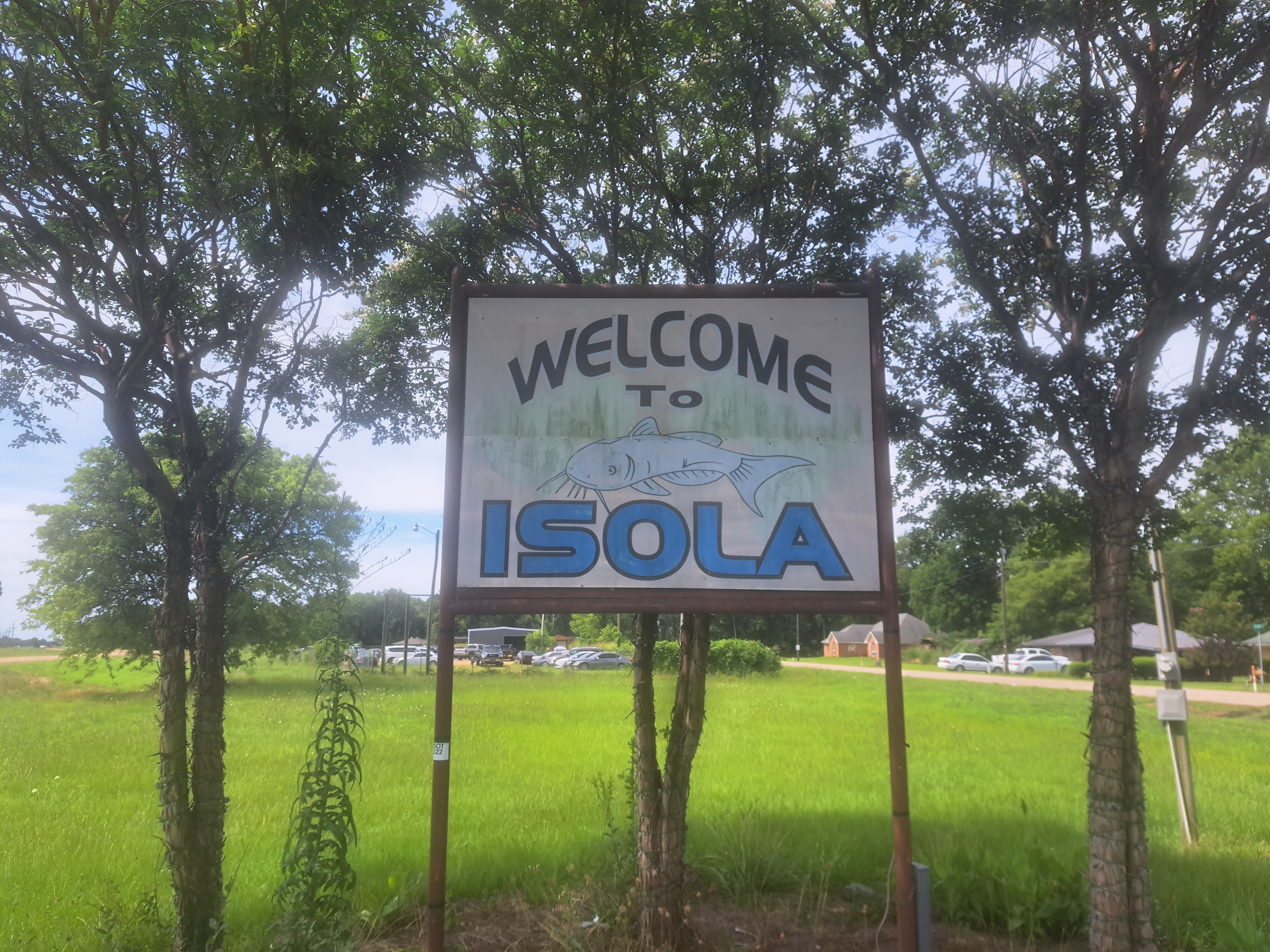
- Welcome Sign in Isola

- Location of Isola, Mississippi

- Location in the United States\
- Coordinates: 33°15′48″N 90°35′32″W
- Country: United States
- State: Mississippi
- County: Humphreys

Area
  - Total: 0.74 sq mi (1.91 km^{2})
  - Land: 0.74 sq mi (1.91 km^{2})
  - Water: 0 sq mi (0.00 km^{2})
- Elevation: 102 ft (31 m)

Population (2020)
  - Total: 638
  - Density: 863/sq mi (333.3/km^{2})
- Time zone: UTC-6 (Central (CST))
  - Summer (DST): UTC-5 (CDT)
- ZIP code: 38754
- Area code: 662
- FIPS code: 28-35220
- GNIS feature ID: 2405895

Isola is a town in Humphreys County, Mississippi, United States, on the banks of Lake Dawson. As of the 2020 census, Isola had a population of 638.

== Etymology ==
The name is derived from "isolation", due to the town's remote location when it was founded.

== Geography ==
Isola is located in northern Humphreys County. It is bordered to the north by Sunflower County. U.S. Route 49W passes through the east side of the town, leading north 15 miles (24 km) to Indianola and southeast 8 miles (13 km) to Belzoni, the Humphreys County seat.

According to the United States Census Bureau, the town has a total area of 0.7 square miles (1.8 km^{2}), all land. The southeast end of Lake Dawson, an old river channel, is near the northwest corner of the town. The lake leads northwest and connects via Pawson Bayou to the Big Sunflower River, a tributary of the Yazoo River.

== Demographics ==
Historical population
Census	Pop.	Note	%±
1910	478		—
1920	616		28.9%
1930	519		−15.7%
1940	449		−13.5%
1950	450		0.2%
1960	532		18.2%
1970	458		−13.9%
1980	834		82.1%
1990	732		−12.2%
2000	768		4.9%
2010	713		−7.2%
2020	638		−10.5%
U.S. Decennial Census

=== Racial and ethnic composition ===
Isola town, Mississippi – Racial and ethnic composition Note: the US Census treats Hispanic/Latino as an ethnic category. This table excludes Latinos from the racial categories and assigns them to a separate category. Hispanics/Latinos may be of any race.
Race / Ethnicity (NH = Non-Hispanic)	Pop 2000	Pop 2010	Pop 2020	% 2000	% 2010	% 2020
White alone (NH)	248	127	89	32.29%	17.81%	13.95%
Black or African American alone (NH)	489	570	526	63.67%	79.94%	82.45%
Native American or Alaska Native alone (NH)	4	0	1	0.52%	0.00%	0.16%
Asian alone (NH)	0	2	0	0.00%	0.28%	0.00%
Native Hawaiian or Pacific Islander alone (NH)	0	0	0	0.00%	0.00%	0.00%
Other race alone (NH)	0	0	1	0.00%	0.00%	0.16%
Mixed or multiracial (NH)	3	2	12	0.39%	0.28%	1.88%
Hispanic or Latino (any race)	24	12	9	3.13%	1.68%	1.41%
Total	768	713	638	100.00%	100.00%	100.00%

=== 2000 census ===
As of the 2000 census, 768 people, 279 households, and 191 families were residing in the town. The population density was 1,040.5 inhabitants per square mile (401.7/km^{2}). The 307 housing units had an average density of 415.9 per square mile (160.6/km^{2}). The racial makeup of the town was 63.67% African American, 32.68% White, 0.52% Native American, 2.73% from other races, and 0.39% from two or more races. Hispanics or Latinos of any race were 3.12% of the population.

Of the 279 households, 33.7% had children under 18 living with them, 38.4% were married couples living together, 25.1% had a female householder with no husband present, and 31.5% were not families. About 28.3% of all households were made up of individuals, and 13.6% had someone living alone who was 65 or older. The average household size was 2.75 and the average family size was 3.37.

In the town, the age distribution was 31.6% under 18, 10.3% from 18 to 24, 24.9% from 25 to 44, 19.0% from 45 to 64, and 14.2% who were 65 or older. The median age was 32 years. For every 100 females, there were 87.3 males. For every 100 females 18 and over, there were 79.2 males.

The median income for a household in the town was $25,063, and for a family was $27,396. Males had a median income of $20,909 versus $17,639 for females. The per capita income for the town was $13,487. About 25.1% of families and 30.8% of the population were below the poverty line, including 48.0% of those under 18 and 18.8% of those 65 or over.

== Education ==
The town is served by the Humphreys County School District. The children in Isola attend school in Belzoni.

== Notable people ==
- Willie Bailey, member of the Mississippi House of Representatives
- Hank Cochran, country music singer and songwriter
