= Humphreys County, Mississippi =

County in Mississippi, United States

- County
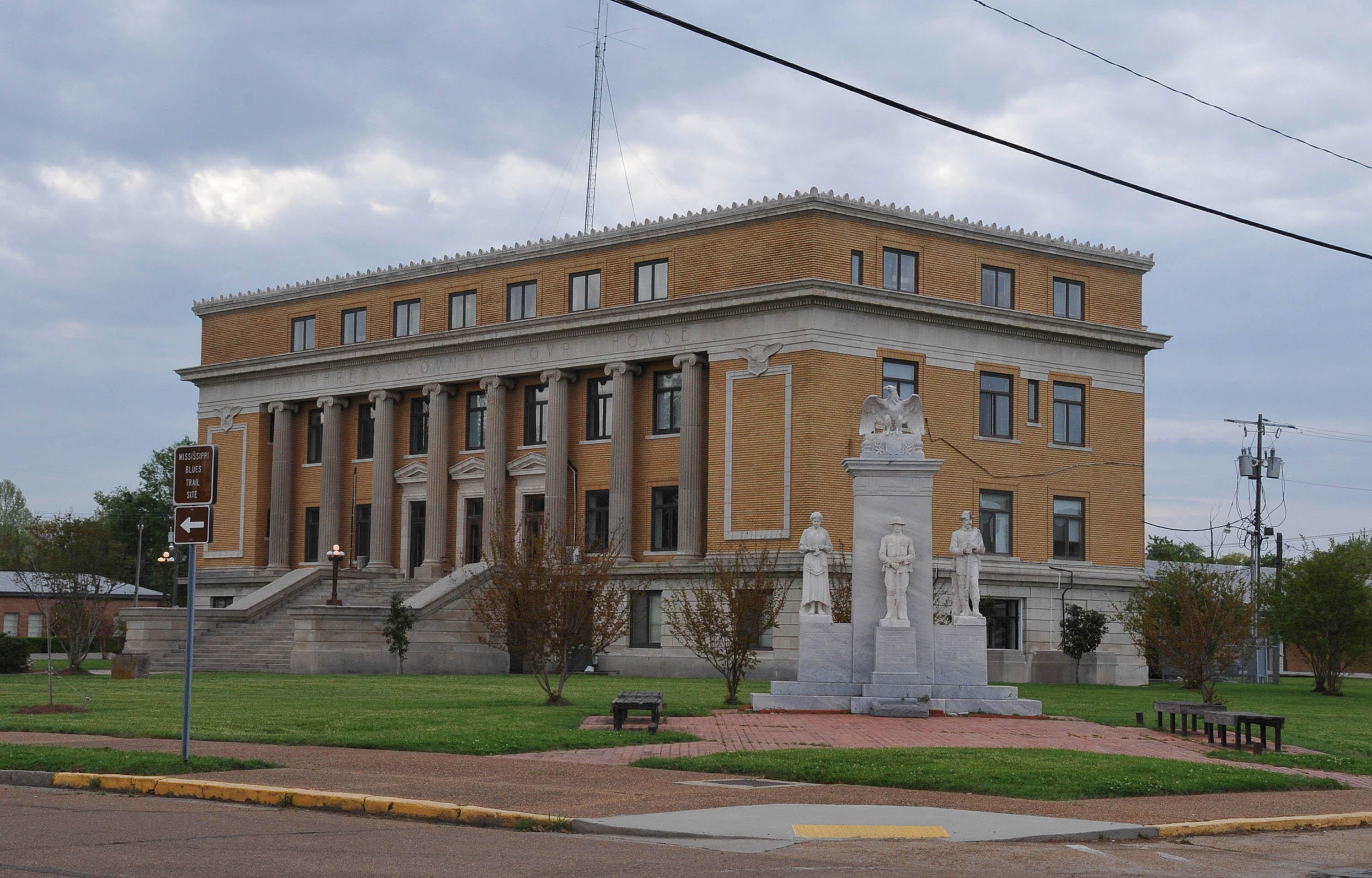
- Humphreys County Courthouse

- Seal Logo

- Location within the U.S. state of Mississippi
- Coordinates: 33°08′N 90°31′W
- Country: United States
- State: Mississippi
- Founded: 1918
- Named for: Benjamin G. Humphreys
- Seat: Belzoni
- Largest city: Belzoni

Area
  - Total: 431 sq mi (1,120 km^{2})
  - Land: 418 sq mi (1,080 km^{2})
  - Water: 13 sq mi (34 km^{2}) 3.0%

Population (2020)
  - Total: 7,785
  - Estimate (2025): 7,001 ▼
  - Density: 18.6/sq mi (7.19/km^{2})
- Time zone: UTC−6 (Central)
  - Summer (DST): UTC−5 (CDT)
- Congressional district: 2nd
- Website: www.humphreyscountyms.com

Humphreys County is a county located in the U.S. state of Mississippi. As of the 2020 census, the population was 7,785. Its county seat is Belzoni. The county is named for Benjamin G. Humphreys. Humphreys County is Mississippi's newest county, having been formed in 1918. Humphreys County is located in the Mississippi Delta region.

It was named 'Farm-Raised Catfish Capital of the World' in 1976 by then Governor Cliff Finch, since it produced more farm-raised catfish than any other U.S. county. Forty thousand acres (160 square kilometers) of the county are underwater and used to grow catfish. About 60% of U.S. farm-raised catfish is raised within a 65-mile (105 km) radius of the county seat, Belzoni. The title "Catfish Capital" has also been claimed by Savannah, Tennessee, and Des Allemands, Louisiana.

In March 2023, the towns of Rolling Fork, Midnight and Silver City were struck by an EF4, part of the tornado outbreak of March 24–25, 2023.

== Geography ==
According to the U.S. Census Bureau, the county has a total area of 431 square miles (1,120 km^{2}), of which 418 sq mi (1,080 km^{2}) is land and 13 sq mi (34 km^{2}) (3.0%) is water.

=== Major highways ===
- U.S. Highway 49W
- Mississippi Highway 7
- Mississippi Highway 12
- Mississippi Highway 14
- Mississippi Highway 16

=== Adjacent counties ===
- Sunflower County (north)
- Leflore County (northeast)
- Holmes County (east)
- Yazoo County (south)
- Sharkey County (southwest)
- Washington County (west)

=== National protected area ===
- Theodore Roosevelt National Wildlife Refuge (part)
- Sky Lake Wildlife Management Area; the 3,500-acre (1,400 ha) area contains some of the oldest and largest bald cypress trees in the world.

== Demographics ==
Historical population
| Census | Pop. | Note | %± |
|---|---|---|---|
| 1920 | 19,192 | | — |
| 1930 | 24,729 | | 28.9% |
| 1940 | 26,257 | | 6.2% |
| 1950 | 23,115 | | −12.0% |
| 1960 | 19,093 | | −17.4% |
| 1970 | 14,601 | | −23.5% |
| 1980 | 13,931 | | −4.6% |
| 1990 | 12,134 | | −12.9% |
| 2000 | 11,206 | | −7.6% |
| 2010 | 9,375 | | −16.3% |
| 2020 | 7,785 | | −17.0% |
| 2025 (est.) | 7,001 | ▼ | −10.1% |
U.S. Decennial Census; 1790–1960 1900–1990; 1990–2000 2010–2013

=== Racial and ethnic composition ===
Humphreys County, Mississippi – Racial and ethnic composition Note: the US Census treats Hispanic/Latino as an ethnic category. This table excludes Latinos from the racial categories and assigns them to a separate category. Hispanics/Latinos may be of any race.
| Race / Ethnicity (NH = Non-Hispanic) | Pop 1980 | Pop 1990 | Pop 2000 | Pop 2010 | Pop 2020 | % 1980 | % 1990 | % 2000 | % 2010 | % 2020 |
|---|---|---|---|---|---|---|---|---|---|---|
| White alone (NH) | 4,700 | 3,837 | 3,006 | 2,133 | 1,423 | 33.74% | 31.62% | 26.82% | 22.75% | 18.28% |
| Black or African American alone (NH) | 8,975 | 8,177 | 7,955 | 6,949 | 6,072 | 64.42% | 67.39% | 70.99% | 74.12% | 78.00% |
| Native American or Alaska Native alone (NH) | 10 | 8 | 9 | 10 | 13 | 0.07% | 0.07% | 0.08% | 0.11% | 0.17% |
| Asian alone (NH) | 52 | 43 | 30 | 20 | 10 | 0.37% | 0.35% | 0.27% | 0.21% | 0.13% |
| Native Hawaiian or Pacific Islander alone (NH) | x | x | 0 | 0 | 0 | x | x | 0.00% | 0.00% | 0.00% |
| Other race alone (NH) | 2 | 0 | 7 | 1 | 8 | 0.01% | 0.00% | 0.06% | 0.01% | 0.10% |
| Mixed race or Multiracial (NH) | x | x | 31 | 60 | 168 | x | x | 0.28% | 0.64% | 2.16% |
| Hispanic or Latino (any race) | 192 | 69 | 168 | 202 | 91 | 1.38% | 0.57% | 1.50% | 2.15% | 1.17% |
| Total | 13,931 | 12,134 | 11,206 | 9,375 | 7,785 | 100.00% | 100.00% | 100.00% | 100.00% | 100.00% |

=== 2020 census ===
As of the 2020 census, the county had a population of 7,785. The median age was 39.9 years. 24.6% of residents were under the age of 18 and 17.7% of residents were 65 years of age or older. For every 100 females there were 88.8 males, and for every 100 females age 18 and over there were 83.2 males age 18 and over.

The racial makeup of the county was 18.5% White, 78.5% Black or African American, 0.2% American Indian and Alaska Native, 0.1% Asian, <0.1% Native Hawaiian and Pacific Islander, 0.4% from some other race, and 2.3% from two or more races. Hispanic or Latino residents of any race comprised 1.2% of the population.

<0.1% of residents lived in urban areas, while 100.0% lived in rural areas.

There were 3,106 households in the county, of which 31.3% had children under the age of 18 living in them. Of all households, 26.6% were married-couple households, 22.5% were households with a male householder and no spouse or partner present, and 45.7% were households with a female householder and no spouse or partner present. About 33.8% of all households were made up of individuals and 14.3% had someone living alone who was 65 years of age or older.

There were 3,528 housing units, of which 12.0% were vacant. Among occupied housing units, 58.7% were owner-occupied and 41.3% were renter-occupied. The homeowner vacancy rate was 2.2% and the rental vacancy rate was 6.1%.

=== 2010 census ===
As of the 2010 United States census, there were 9,375 people living in the county: 74.5% were Black or African American, 23.5% White, 0.2% Asian, 0.1% Native American, 0.9% of some other race and 0.7% of two or more races, and 2.2% were Hispanic or Latino (of any race).

=== 2000 census ===
At the 2000 census, there were 11,206 people, 3,765 households and 2,695 families living in the county. The population density was 27 per square mile (10/km^{2}). There were 4,138 housing units at an average density of 10 per square mile (3.9/km^{2}). The racial makeup of the county was 27.17% White, 71.51% Black or African-American, 0.10% Native American, 0.27% Asian, 0.64% from other races, and 0.31% from two or more races. 1.50% of the population were Hispanic or Latino of any race.

There were 3,765 households, of which 36.60% had children under the age of 18 living with them, 38.30% were married couples living together, 27.70% had a female householder with no husband present, and 28.40% were non-families. Of all households, 24.90% were made up of individuals, and 10.90% had someone living alone who was 65 years of age or older. The average household size was 2.95 and the average family size was 3.54.

Age distribution was 32.70% under the age of 18, 10.70% from 18 to 24, 25.80% from 25 to 44, 18.80% from 45 to 64, and 12.00% who were 65 years of age or older. The median age was 30 years. For every 100 females there were 87.50 males. For every 100 females age 18 and over, there were 78.70 males.

The median household income was $20,566, and the median family income was $23,719. Males had a median income of $24,948 versus $19,201 for females. The per capita income for the county was $10,926. About 32.40% of families and 38.20% of the population were below the poverty line, including 50.30% of those under age 18 and 31.00% of those age 65 or over.

Humphreys County has the seventh-lowest per capita income in Mississippi and the 56th-lowest in the United States.

In April 2019, Propublica identified Humphreys County as the county most intensely audited by the IRS.

== Politics ==
Like most counties in the Delta, Humphreys County is solidly Democratic. The last Republican presidential candidate to win the county was Richard Nixon in 1972. In 2001 the Humphreys County Sheriff's Department named J. D. Roseman the first black Chief Deputy. In 2008 he became the first black Sheriff of Humphreys County.

United States presidential election results for Humphreys County, Mississippi
| Year | Republican | | Democratic | | Third party(ies) | |
| Year | No. | % | No. | % | No. | % |
|---|---|---|---|---|---|---|
| 1920 | 21 | 6.19% | 316 | 93.22% | 2 | 0.59% |
| 1924 | 33 | 4.99% | 628 | 95.01% | 0 | 0.00% |
| 1928 | 1 | 0.10% | 1,020 | 99.90% | 0 | 0.00% |
| 1932 | 10 | 1.27% | 775 | 98.73% | 0 | 0.00% |
| 1936 | 7 | 0.60% | 1,164 | 99.40% | 0 | 0.00% |
| 1940 | 20 | 1.85% | 1,061 | 98.15% | 0 | 0.00% |
| 1944 | 35 | 2.95% | 1,150 | 97.05% | 0 | 0.00% |
| 1948 | 11 | 0.96% | 17 | 1.49% | 1,116 | 97.55% |
| 1952 | 589 | 40.70% | 858 | 59.30% | 0 | 0.00% |
| 1956 | 127 | 9.81% | 576 | 44.51% | 591 | 45.67% |
| 1960 | 231 | 16.24% | 459 | 32.28% | 732 | 51.48% |
| 1964 | 1,863 | 95.69% | 84 | 4.31% | 0 | 0.00% |
| 1968 | 258 | 7.11% | 1,219 | 33.60% | 2,151 | 59.29% |
| 1972 | 2,334 | 69.01% | 892 | 26.37% | 156 | 4.61% |
| 1976 | 1,445 | 38.29% | 2,172 | 57.55% | 157 | 4.16% |
| 1980 | 1,841 | 36.67% | 2,970 | 59.16% | 209 | 4.16% |
| 1984 | 2,309 | 46.99% | 2,596 | 52.83% | 9 | 0.18% |
| 1988 | 2,018 | 42.98% | 2,644 | 56.32% | 33 | 0.70% |
| 1992 | 1,721 | 36.75% | 2,696 | 57.57% | 266 | 5.68% |
| 1996 | 1,382 | 36.24% | 2,305 | 60.45% | 126 | 3.30% |
| 2000 | 1,628 | 41.28% | 2,288 | 58.01% | 28 | 0.71% |
| 2004 | 1,679 | 34.27% | 3,168 | 64.67% | 52 | 1.06% |
| 2008 | 1,462 | 28.52% | 3,634 | 70.89% | 30 | 0.59% |
| 2012 | 1,293 | 24.81% | 3,903 | 74.88% | 16 | 0.31% |
| 2016 | 1,151 | 27.06% | 3,071 | 72.21% | 31 | 0.73% |
| 2020 | 1,118 | 26.69% | 3,016 | 72.00% | 55 | 1.31% |
| 2024 | 990 | 28.55% | 2,443 | 70.44% | 35 | 1.01% |

== Media ==
- Radio stations (both located in Belzoni)
  - WELZ 1460AM (Country)
  - WBYP 107.1FM (Country)
- Newspapers
  - The Belzoni Banner, distributed weekly
  - The Enterprise-Tocsin, a newspaper based in Indianola in Sunflower County, is distributed in portions of northern Humphreys County.

== Communities ==
=== City ===
- Belzoni (county seat)

=== Towns ===
- Isola
- Louise
- Silver City

=== Unincorporated communities ===
- Bellewood
- Deovolente
- Lodi
- Midnight

== Education ==
There is one school district: Humphreys County School District, which has boundaries coterminous with those of the county.

== See also ==
- National Register of Historic Places listings in Humphreys County, Mississippi
