= Silver City, Mississippi =

- Town
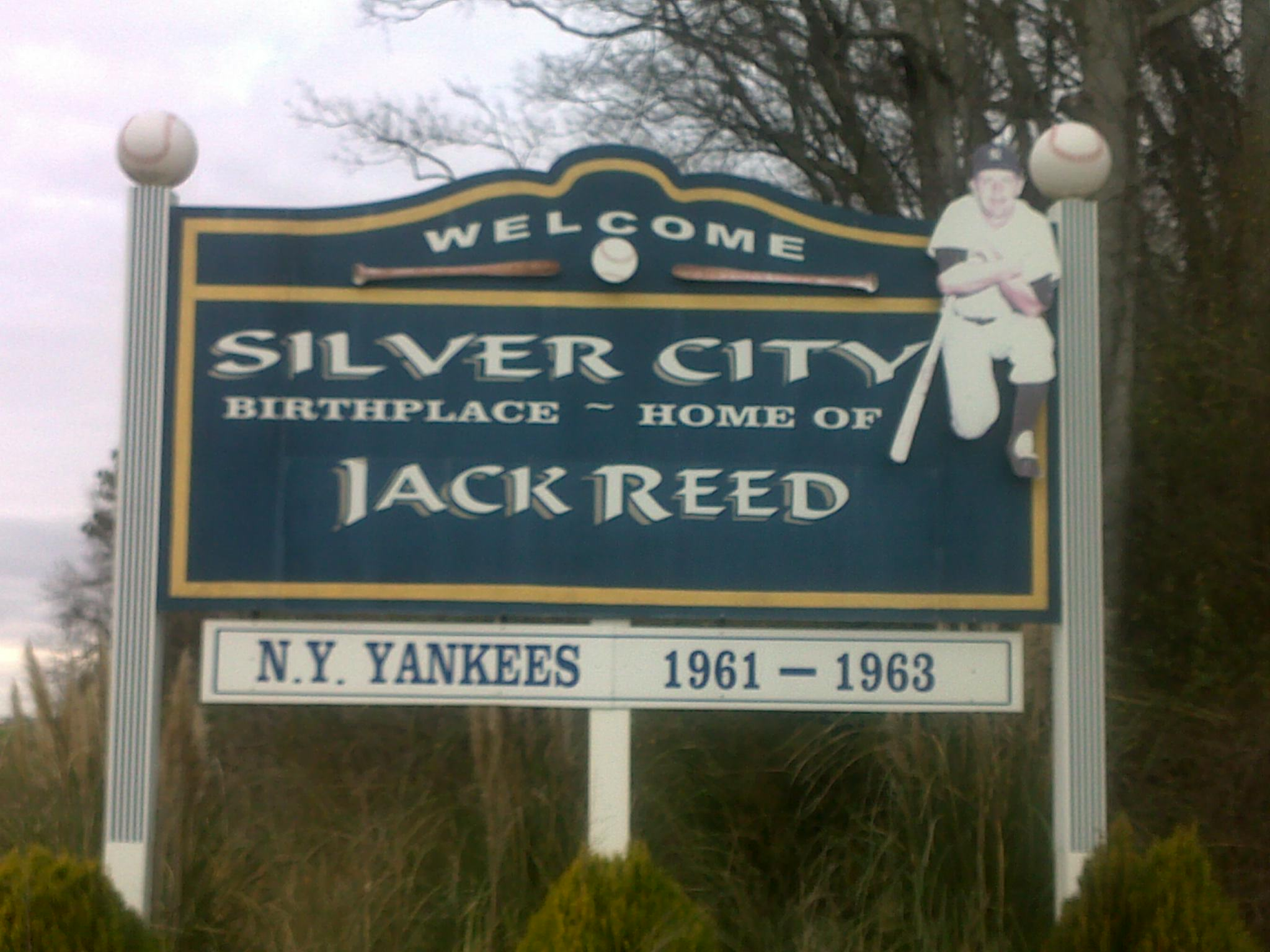
- Welcome sign (2012)

- Location within Humphreys County and Mississippi
- Coordinates: 33°05′33″N 90°30′02″W
- Country: United States
- State: Mississippi
- County: Humphreys

Area
  - Total: 0.63 sq mi (1.62 km^{2})
  - Land: 0.60 sq mi (1.56 km^{2})
  - Water: 0.023 sq mi (0.06 km^{2})
- Elevation: 112 ft (34 m)

Population (2020)
  - Total: 223
  - Density: 369.3/sq mi (142.59/km^{2})
- Time zone: UTC-6 (Central (CST))
  - Summer (DST): UTC-5 (CDT)
- ZIP code: 39166
- Area code: 662
- FIPS code: 28-67920
- GNIS ID: 2407340

Silver City is a town in Humphreys County, Mississippi, United States. The population was 217 at the 2021 census, a decline of 33% from the 2000 census.

== History ==
The town was first named "Palmetto Home", after a nearby plantation.

=== 2023 tornado ===
On March 24, 2023, a destructive wedge tornado directly hit Silver City. Numerous people were injured and several buildings were destroyed. The same destructive tornado had previously hit the towns of Rolling Fork and Midnight. The tornado was rated high-end EF4, although only EF2 damage occurred in the town.

== Geography ==
Silver City is located in central Humphreys County at 33°5′43″N 90°29′45″W (33.095335, -90.495814), in the Mississippi Delta region. It is bordered to the east by the Yazoo River. U.S. Route 49W passes through the town, leading north 7 miles (11 km) to Belzoni, the county seat, and south 20 miles (32 km) to Yazoo City. Mississippi Highway 149, an old alignment of US 49W, leads southwest from Silver City 10 miles (16 km) to Louise.

According to the United States Census Bureau, Silver City has a total area of 0.62 square miles (1.6 km^{2}), of which 0.02 square miles (0.06 km^{2}), or 3.56%, are water.

== Demographics ==
Historical population
Census	Pop.	Note	%±
1880	45		—
1910	341		—
1920	322		−5.6%
1930	361		12.1%
1940	390		8.0%
1950	381		−2.3%
1960	431		13.1%
1970	370		−14.2%
1980	378		2.2%
1990	348		−7.9%
2000	337		−3.2%
2010	337		0.0%
2020	223		−33.8%
U.S. Decennial Census

=== Racial and ethnic composition ===
Silver City town, Mississippi – Racial and ethnic composition Note: the US Census treats Hispanic/Latino as an ethnic category. This table excludes Latinos from the racial categories and assigns them to a separate category. Hispanics/Latinos may be of any race.
Race / Ethnicity (NH = Non-Hispanic)	Pop 2000	Pop 2010	Pop 2020	% 2000	% 2010	% 2020
White alone (NH)	73	90	50	21.66%	26.71%	22.42%
Black or African American alone (NH)	264	244	167	78.34%	72.40%	74.89%
Native American or Alaska Native alone (NH)	0	0	0	0.00%	0.00%	0.00%
Asian alone (NH)	0	3	0	0.00%	0.89%	0.00%
Native Hawaiian or Pacific Islander alone (NH)	0	0	0	0.00%	0.00%	0.00%
Other race alone (NH)	0	0	1	0.00%	0.00%	0.45%
Mixed race or Multiracial (NH)	0	0	5	0.00%	0.00%	2.24%
Hispanic or Latino (any race)	0	0	0	0.00%	0.00%	0.00%
Total	337	337	223	100.00%	100.00%	100.00%

=== 2000 census ===
As of the census of 2000, there were 337 people, 124 households, and 76 families residing in the town. The population density was 553.7 inhabitants per square mile (213.8/km^{2}). There were 133 housing units at an average density of 218.5 per square mile (84.4/km^{2}). The racial makeup of the town was 21.66% White and 78.34% African American.

There were 124 households, out of which 33.1% had children under the age of 18 living with them, 31.5% were married couples living together, 24.2% had a female householder with no husband present, and 38.7% were non-families. 36.3% of all households were made up of individuals, and 15.3% had someone living alone who was 65 years of age or older. The average household size was 2.72 and the average family size was 3.59.

In the town, the population was spread out, with 30.6% under the age of 18, 9.2% from 18 to 24, 24.0% from 25 to 44, 22.0% from 45 to 64, and 14.2% who were 65 years of age or older. The median age was 36 years. For every 100 females, there were 87.2 males. For every 100 females age 18 and over, there were 68.3 males.

The median income for a household in the town was $22,083, and the median income for a family was $20,000. Males had a median income of $23,125 versus $16,250 for females. The per capita income for the town was $15,459. About 36.6% of families and 49.3% of the population were below the poverty line, including 70.8% of those under age 18 and 38.6% of those age 65 or over.

== Education ==
Silver City is served by the Humphreys County School District.

== Notable people ==
- Spencer Haywood, participated on the US Olympic gold medal-winning basketball team, then played professionally
- Jack Reed, professional baseball player and member of the 1961 World Series champion New York Yankees
