= Midnight, Mississippi =

Unincorporated community in Mississippi, United States

- Unincorporated community
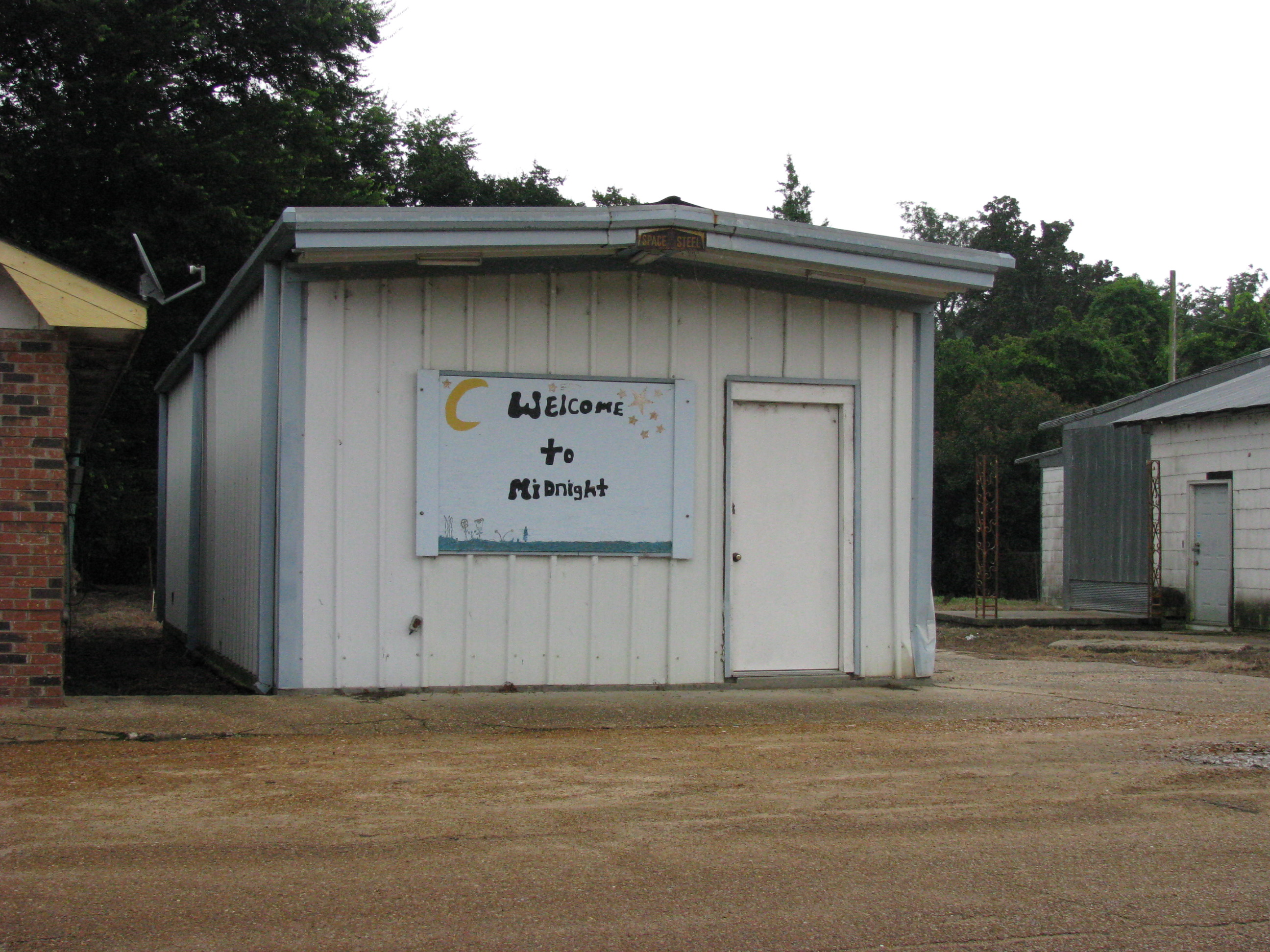
- Welcome Sign on a building in downtown Midnight

- Location within Mississippi Location within the United States
- Coordinates: 33°02′58″N 90°34′24″W
- Country: United States
- State: Mississippi
- County: Humphreys
- Elevation: 112 ft (34 m)
- Time zone: UTC-6 (Central (CST))
  - Summer (DST): UTC-5 (CDT)
- ZIP code: 39115
- Area code: 662
- GNIS feature ID: 673539

Midnight is an unincorporated community located in Humphreys County, Mississippi, United States. Midnight is approximately 5 miles (8.0 km) north of Louise and 5 miles (8.0 km) southwest of Silver City along Mississippi Highway 149. Although Midnight is unincorporated, it has a zip code of 39115.

== History ==
According to tradition, the original town site was won in a midnight poker hand, hence the name of the community.

A post office called Midnight was established in 1897. The post office building survived the Great Mississippi Flood of 1927. On October 5, 2002 the Midnight post office closed. By 2010, it had been demolished as part of the USPS's service cuts. In the 2000s, resident Gwen McKenzie and other Midnight residents lobbied to have a highway sign installed that indicated the direction to Midnight. In 2009 the streets in Midnight received names and numbers.

=== 2023 tornado ===
On March 24, 2023, a large and extremely destructive wedge tornado struck Midnight, causing severe damage. The same destructive tornado previously hit the town of Rolling Fork and would later hit Silver City as well. The tornado was rated high-end EF4, although only EF2 damage occurred in the town.

== Demographics ==
As of 2010 Midnight has fewer than 200 residents.

== Geography ==
Shashank Bengali of McClatchy Newspapers said that Midnight "feels like a place whose time has expired." Bengali explains that the clapboard houses, which were built almost one century before 2010, "rot on their cinder-block legs, tilting at crazy angles" and that Midnight's principal road is "dotted with abandoned or half-burned cabins that, older residents complain, young men disappear into to shoot dice or smoke pot as the days fade into dusk."

== Government and infrastructure ==
Houses in Midnight did not have street addresses until 2009. Midnight does not have a sewage system. Shashank Bengali of McClatchy Newspapers says that Midnight's electricity is "spotty."

== Education ==
Residents are zoned to the Humphreys County School District.

== Notable people ==
- George Cartwright, founder of the band Curlew.
- John B. Nixon, convicted murderer executed in 2005.

== In popular culture ==
In the 2000 film, Where the Heart Is, starring Natalie Portman, an older couple came from Midnight to reprimand Novalee for having her baby out of wedlock. They called it an abomination and later abducted the baby.

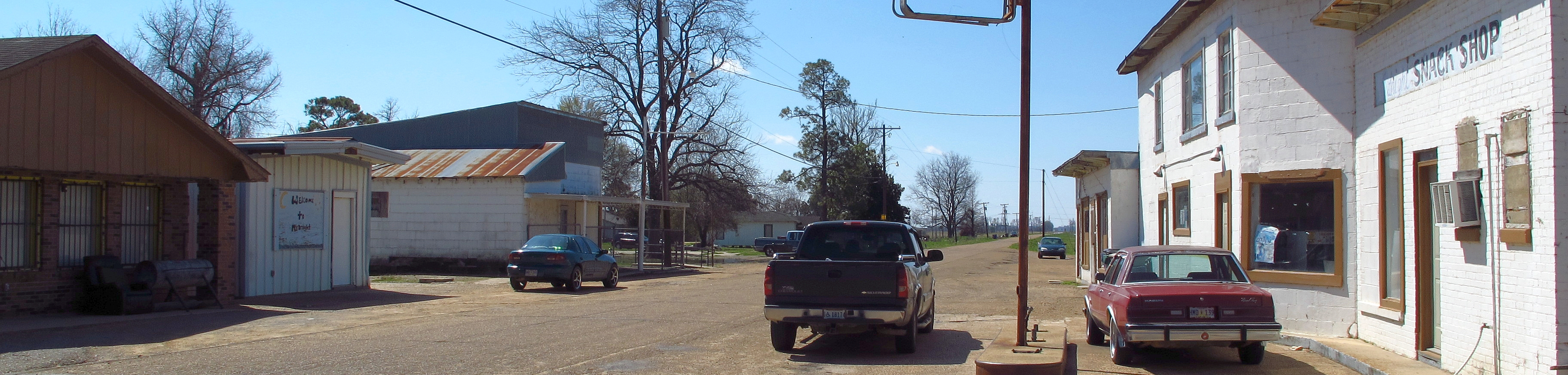
Midnight, 2014
