= Rolling Fork, Mississippi =

- City and county seat
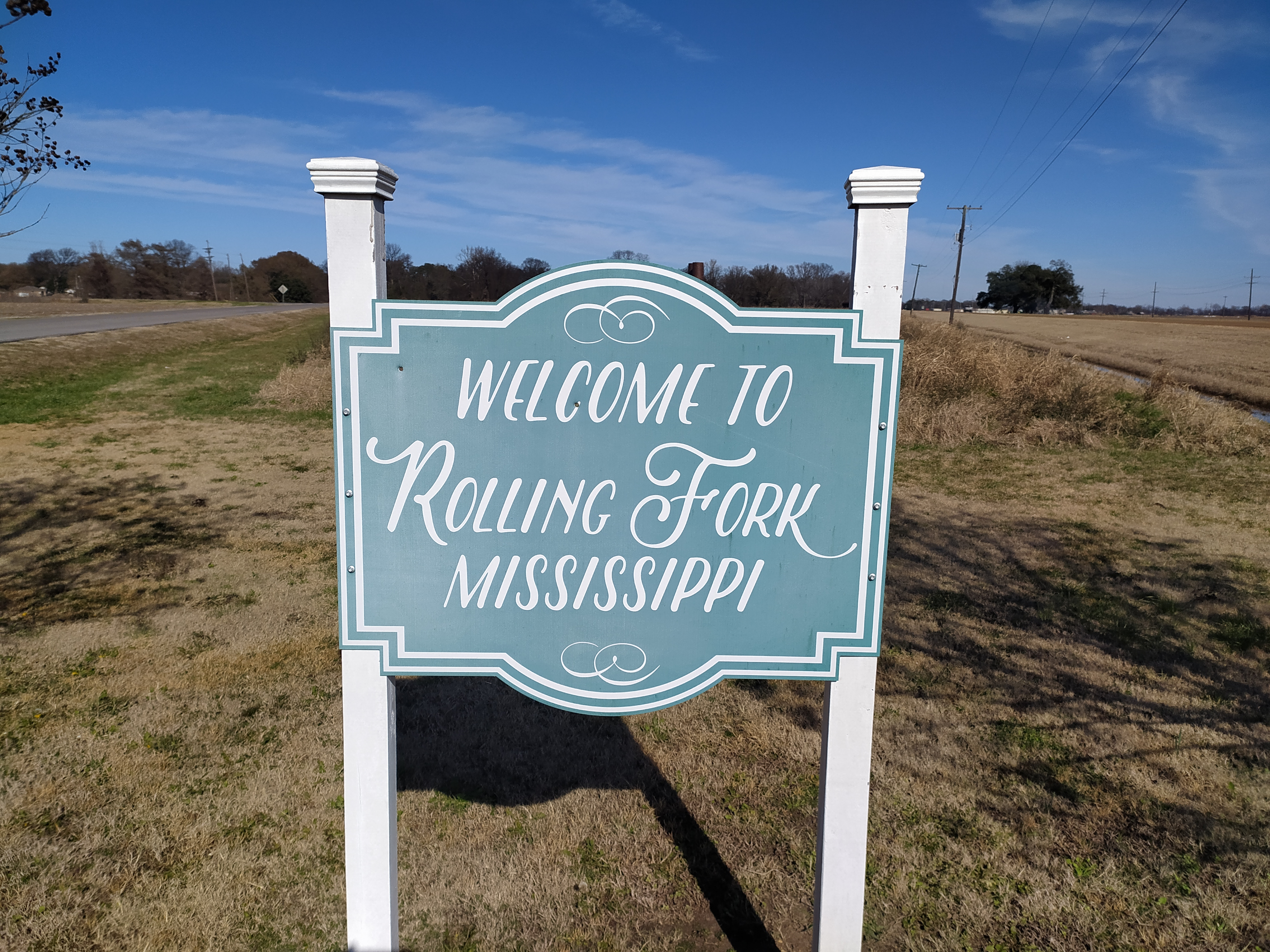
- Welcome sign (2022)

- Flag

- Location within Sharkey County and Mississippi

- Location in the United States
- Coordinates: 32°54′33″N 90°52′26″W
- Country: United States
- State: Mississippi
- County: Sharkey

Area
  - Total: 1.41 sq mi (3.66 km^{2})
  - Land: 1.41 sq mi (3.66 km^{2})
  - Water: 0 sq mi (0.00 km^{2})
- Elevation: 108 ft (33 m)

Population (2020)
  - Total: 1,883
  - Density: 1,334.0/sq mi (515.07/km^{2})
- Time zone: UTC-6 (Central (CST))
  - Summer (DST): UTC-5 (CDT)
- ZIP Code: 39159
- Area code: 662
- FIPS code: 28-63560
- GNIS ID: 2404646

Rolling Fork is a city in and the county seat of Sharkey County, Mississippi, United States. As of the 2020 census, the population of the town was 1,883.

== History ==
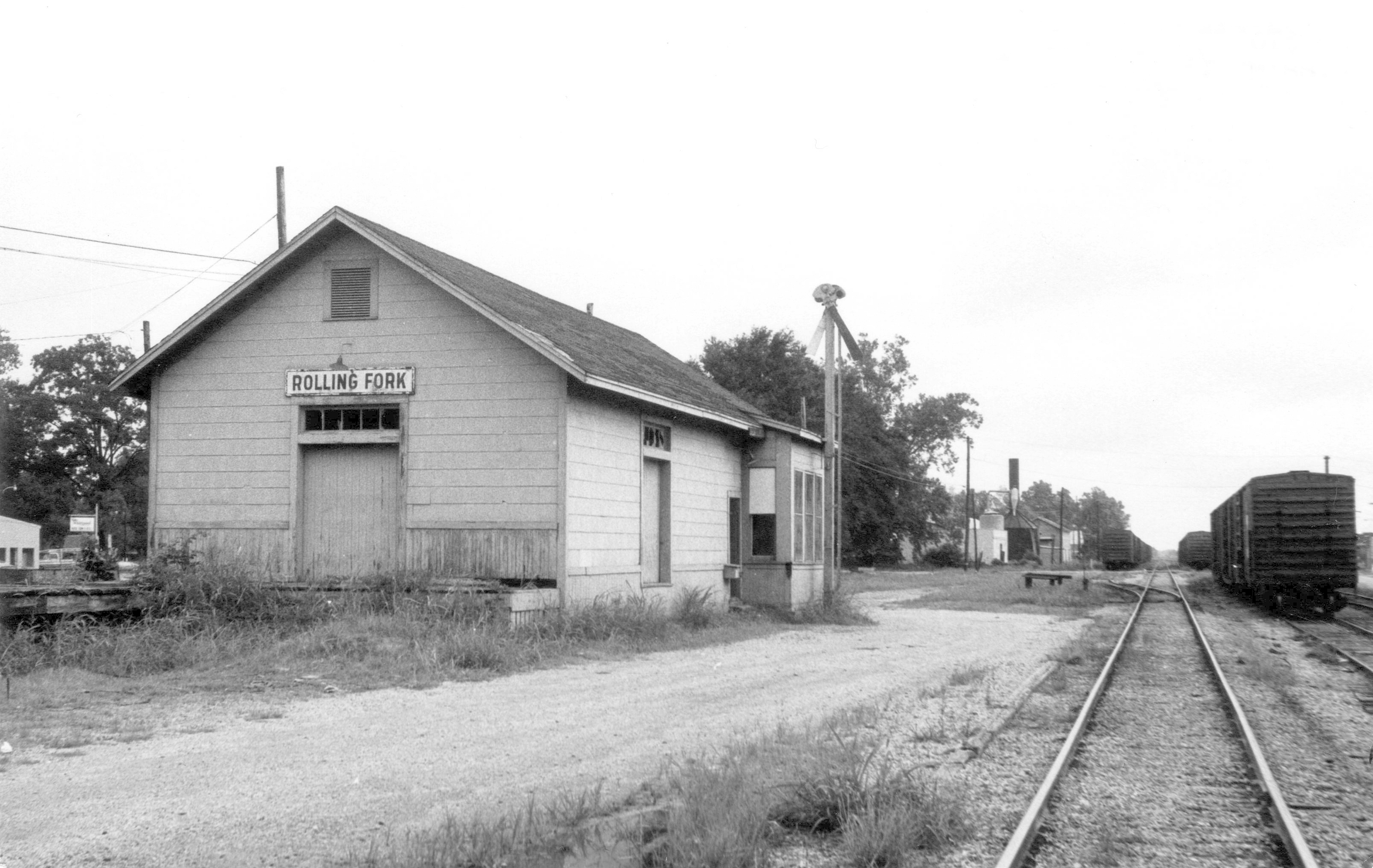
Illinois Central Railroad depot in Rolling Fork

Thomas Y. Chaney settled here in 1828, and was the first European-American settler in the area. The Choctaw, longtime indigenous occupants, had been forced out by new settler pressure and government treaties to gain their land.

Deer Creek flows through the settlement. Chaney called the place "Rolling Fork" because of the swiftness of the water at a fork in the creek there. A post office was established in 1848.

When Sharkey County was established in 1876, during the Reconstruction era, Rolling Fork was made the county seat. A newspaper, The Deer Creek Pilot, was established in 1884.

The Louisville, New Orleans and Texas Railway was built through Rolling Fork in 1883. It was later acquired by the Illinois Central Railroad. In 1908, the Bank of Rolling Fork was established.

Since 2002, the town has hosted an annual October festival called the Great Delta Bear Affair, originally commemorating President Theodore Roosevelt’s bear hunt in 1902 in Sharkey County. During each festival, an artist carves a new wooden statue of a bear which is then added to the town's streets.

=== 2023 tornado ===
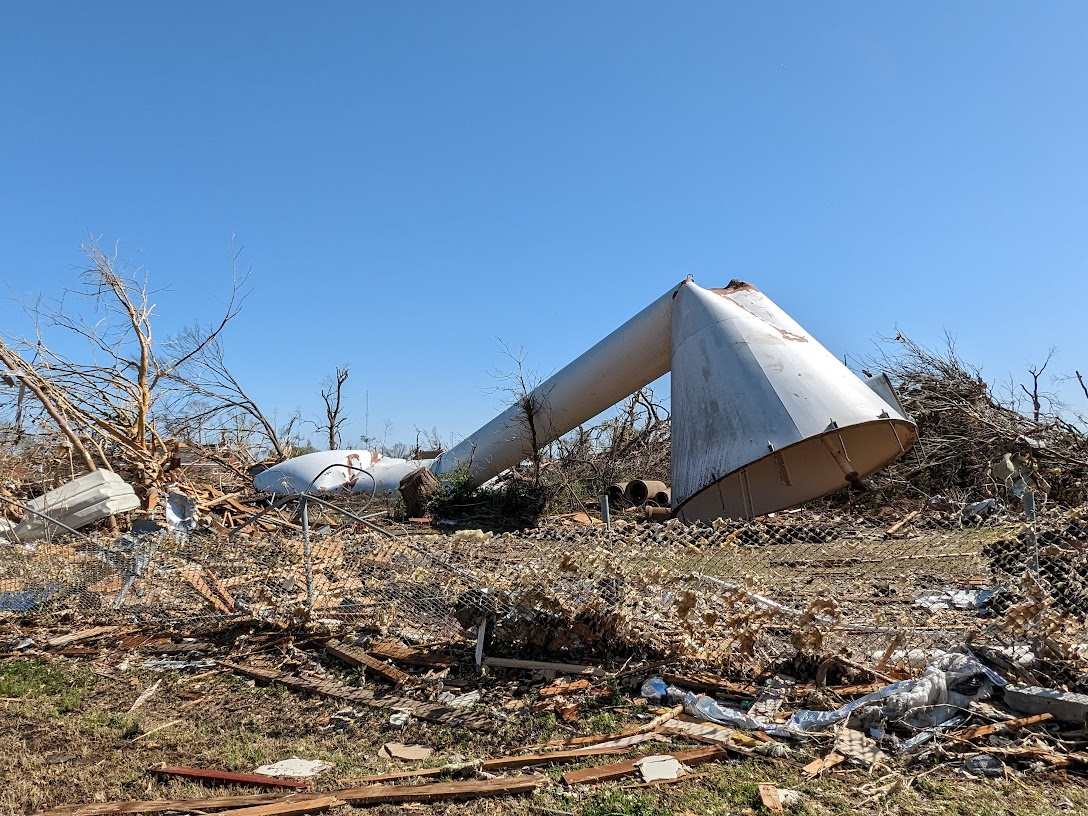
A water tower in Rolling Fork, destroyed by the March 24, 2023 tornado

On March 24, 2023, shortly after 8:00 p.m. CDT, Rolling Fork was struck by a destructive and deadly high–end EF4 tornado with winds of 195 mph. The tornado formed from a supercell thunderstorm in northern Issaquena County, whereupon it moved northeast towards and into Rolling Fork. The National Weather Service issued a tornado emergency for the community shortly before the storm entered the town and dealt catastrophic damage to many structures. The town's post office, city hall, and police department lost parts of or the entirety of their roofs. Multiple businesses—some of metal or brick construction—were completely destroyed, in addition to dozens of houses and mobile homes. One of the town's water towers was blown over, two grain trucks were thrown into each other, power lines were knocked down, and trees were uprooted, some even debarked. The tornado killed 17 people in Rolling Fork and nearby Midnight and Silver City, while injuring 165 more. Following the tornado, Rolling Fork's existing tornado siren was repaired and a new siren was donated and installed on the opposite side of the town.

== Geography ==
According to the United States Census Bureau, the city has a total area of 1.4 square miles (3.6 km^{2}), all land.

=== Climate ===
Climate data for Rolling Fork, Mississippi (1991–2020 normals, extremes 1936–1937, 1969–2016)
Month	Jan	Feb	Mar	Apr	May	Jun	Jul	Aug	Sep	Oct	Nov	Dec	Year
Record high °F (°C)	80 (27)	88 (31)	89 (32)	95 (35)	99 (37)	103 (39)	104 (40)	106 (41)	106 (41)	98 (37)	89 (32)	83 (28)	106 (41)
Mean daily maximum °F (°C)	55.2 (12.9)	59.5 (15.3)	68.3 (20.2)	76.6 (24.8)	84.2 (29.0)	90.7 (32.6)	93.0 (33.9)	93.2 (34.0)	88.7 (31.5)	78.8 (26.0)	67.0 (19.4)	57.9 (14.4)	76.1 (24.5)
Daily mean °F (°C)	45.8 (7.7)	49.8 (9.9)	57.9 (14.4)	65.7 (18.7)	74.1 (23.4)	81.0 (27.2)	83.3 (28.5)	82.8 (28.2)	77.7 (25.4)	66.9 (19.4)	55.9 (13.3)	48.6 (9.2)	65.8 (18.8)
Mean daily minimum °F (°C)	36.5 (2.5)	40.0 (4.4)	47.4 (8.6)	54.8 (12.7)	64.0 (17.8)	71.2 (21.8)	73.7 (23.2)	72.5 (22.5)	66.6 (19.2)	55.0 (12.8)	44.9 (7.2)	39.3 (4.1)	55.5 (13.1)
Record low °F (°C)	4 (−16)	8 (−13)	12 (−11)	27 (−3)	38 (3)	49 (9)	58 (14)	51 (11)	40 (4)	25 (−4)	11 (−12)	−2 (−19)	−2 (−19)
Average precipitation inches (mm)	5.10 (130)	5.23 (133)	4.90 (124)	6.13 (156)	5.02 (128)	3.91 (99)	4.31 (109)	3.21 (82)	3.41 (87)	4.42 (112)	4.19 (106)	5.45 (138)	55.28 (1,404)
Average snowfall inches (cm)	0.0 (0.0)	0.3 (0.76)	0.0 (0.0)	0.0 (0.0)	0.0 (0.0)	0.0 (0.0)	0.0 (0.0)	0.0 (0.0)	0.0 (0.0)	0.0 (0.0)	0.0 (0.0)	0.0 (0.0)	0.3 (0.76)
Average precipitation days (≥ 0.01 in)	10.4	9.1	9.6	7.9	8.5	7.7	8.0	7.1	5.5	6.4	7.9	9.7	97.8
Average snowy days (≥ 0.1 in)	0.0	0.2	0.0	0.0	0.0	0.0	0.0	0.0	0.0	0.0	0.0	0.0	0.3
Source: NOAA

== Demographics ==
Historical population
Census	Pop.	Note	%±
1880	91		—
1920	703		—
1930	902		28.3%
1940	1,320		46.3%
1950	1,229		−6.9%
1960	1,619		31.7%
1970	2,034		25.6%
1980	2,590		27.3%
1990	2,444		−5.6%
2000	2,486		1.7%
2010	2,143		−13.8%
2020	1,883		−12.1%
U.S. Decennial Census

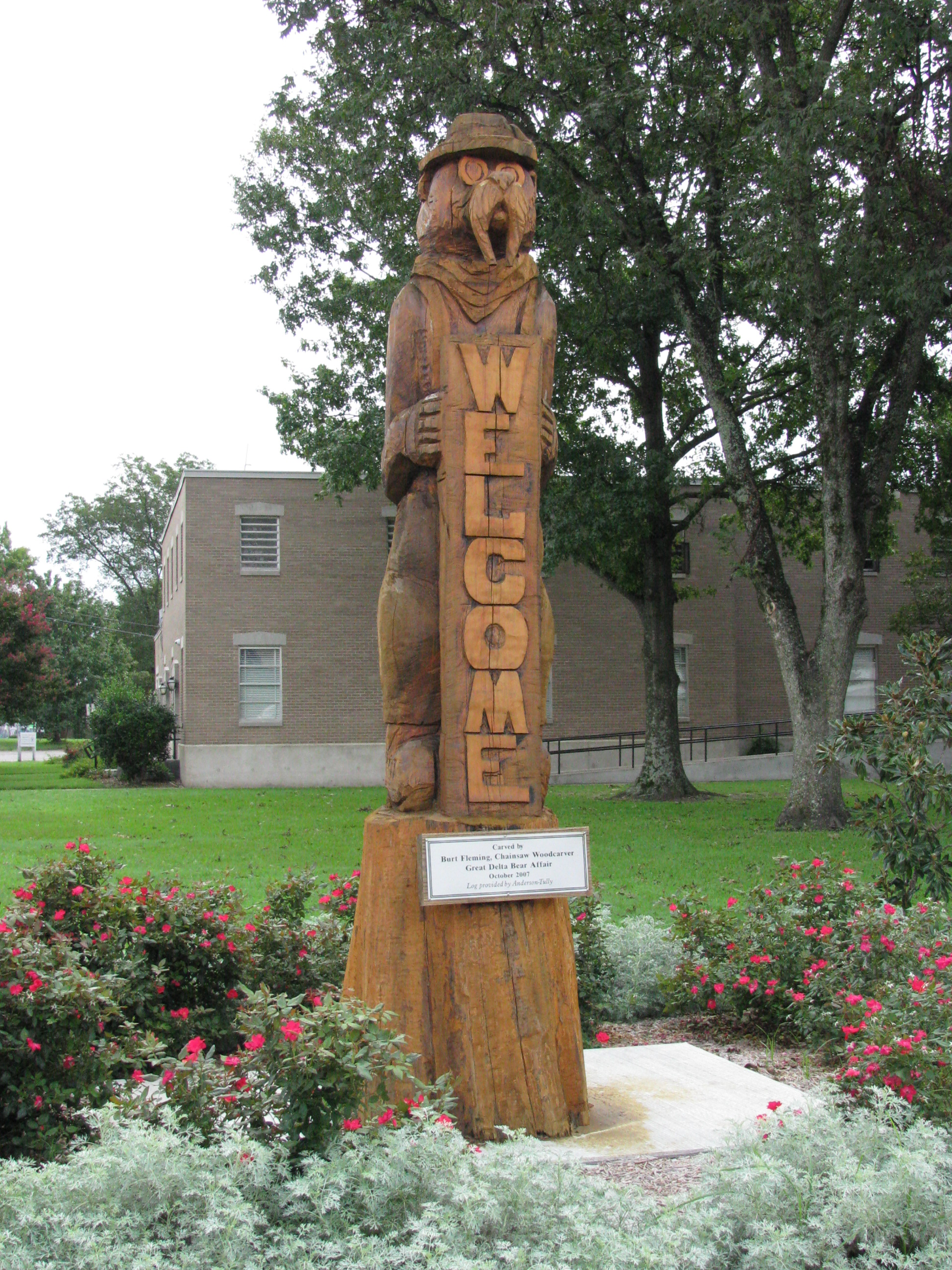
Welcome carving (2008)

=== Racial and ethnic composition ===
Rolling Fork city, Mississippi – Racial and ethnic composition Note: the US Census treats Hispanic/Latino as an ethnic category. This table excludes Latinos from the racial categories and assigns them to a separate category. Hispanics/Latinos may be of any race.
Race / Ethnicity (NH = Non-Hispanic)	Pop 2000	Pop 2010	Pop 2020	% 2000	% 2010	% 2020
White alone (NH)	736	548	423	29.61%	25.57%	22.46%
Black or African American alone (NH)	1,701	1,559	1,392	68.42%	72.75%	73.92%
Native American or Alaska Native alone (NH)	1	1	0	0.04%	0.05%	0.00%
Asian alone (NH)	8	7	4	0.32%	0.33%	0.21%
Native Hawaiian or Pacific Islander alone (NH)	0	0	3	0.00%	0.00%	0.16%
Other race alone (NH)	0	0	0	0.00%	0.00%	0.00%
Mixed race or Multiracial (NH)	16	14	38	0.64%	0.65%	2.02%
Hispanic or Latino (any race)	24	14	23	0.97%	0.65%	1.22%
Total	2,486	2,143	1,883	100.00%	100.00%	100.00%

=== 2020 census ===
As of the 2020 census, Rolling Fork had a population of 1,883. There were 724 households and 498 families residing in the city. The median age was 42.2 years. 24.5% of residents were under the age of 18 and 19.8% of residents were 65 years of age or older. For every 100 females there were 84.8 males, and for every 100 females age 18 and over there were 78.2 males age 18 and over.

0.0% of residents lived in urban areas, while 100.0% lived in rural areas.

There were 724 households in Rolling Fork, of which 32.0% had children under the age of 18 living in them. Of all households, 29.3% were married-couple households, 19.1% were households with a male householder and no spouse or partner present, and 44.8% were households with a female householder and no spouse or partner present. About 33.6% of all households were made up of individuals and 14.5% had someone living alone who was 65 years of age or older.

There were 802 housing units, of which 9.7% were vacant. The homeowner vacancy rate was 1.8% and the rental vacancy rate was 9.1%.

Racial composition as of the 2020 census
Race	Number	Percent
White	423	22.5%
Black or African American	1,402	74.5%
American Indian and Alaska Native	0	0.0%
Asian	5	0.3%
Native Hawaiian and Other Pacific Islander	3	0.2%
Some other race	3	0.2%
Two or more races	47	2.5%

=== 2000 census ===
As of the census of 2000, there were 2,486 people, 820 households, and 620 families residing in the city. The population density was 1,774.2 inhabitants per square mile (685.0/km^{2}). There were 875 housing units at an average density of 624.5 per square mile (241.1/km^{2}). The racial makeup of the city was

- 69.19% African American,
- 29.69% White,
- 0.04% Native American,
- 0.32% Asian, and 0.76% from two or more races.
- Hispanic or Latino of any race were 0.97% of the population.

There were 820 households, out of which 35.9% had children under the age of 18 living with them, 37.9% were married couples living together, 32.8% had a female householder with no husband present, and 24.3% were non-families. Of all households, 22.2% were made up of individuals, and 9.5% had someone living alone who was 65 years of age or older. The average household size was 2.90 and the average family size was 3.40.

In the city, the population was spread out, with 30.8% under the age of 18, 11.9% from 18 to 24, 23.8% from 25 to 44, 20.4% from 45 to 64, and 13.2% who were 65 years of age or older. The median age was 32 years. For every 100 females, there were 83.6 males. For every 100 females age 18 and over, there were 75.4 males.

The median income for a household in the city was $23,081, and the median income for a family was $24,911. Males had a median income of $25,729 versus $17,065 for females. The per capita income for the city was $11,481. About 30.6% of families and 37.1% of the population were below the poverty line, including 50.0% of those under age 18 and 24.6% of those age 65 or over.

== Education ==
=== Public schools ===
The city of Rolling Fork is served by the South Delta School District. The district has three schools with a total enrollment of approximately 1,300 students.

=== Private schools ===
- Sharkey-Issaquena Academy

== Notable people ==
- James Robinson Christenberry, member of the Mississippi Senate from 1960 to 1964
- Robert Colby, songwriter and theater producer
- Earlean Collins, Illinois State Senator from 1976 to 1998
- Tommy Davidson, actor and professional comedian
- Johnny Dyer, blues musician
- Althea Brown Edmiston, teacher and Christian missionary
- Jack Holmes, professional football player
- Walter A. Scott, mayor of Jackson, Mississippi from 1917 to 1945
- Larry Smith, professional basketball player
- Willie Mae Ford Smith, gospel singer
- Joseph T. Taylor, educator, academic, activist
- Muddy Waters, blues musician
- Slick Watts, professional basketball player
- Fielding L. Wright, Governor of Mississippi and 1948 vice-presidential candidate
