= Tornadoes in Mississippi =

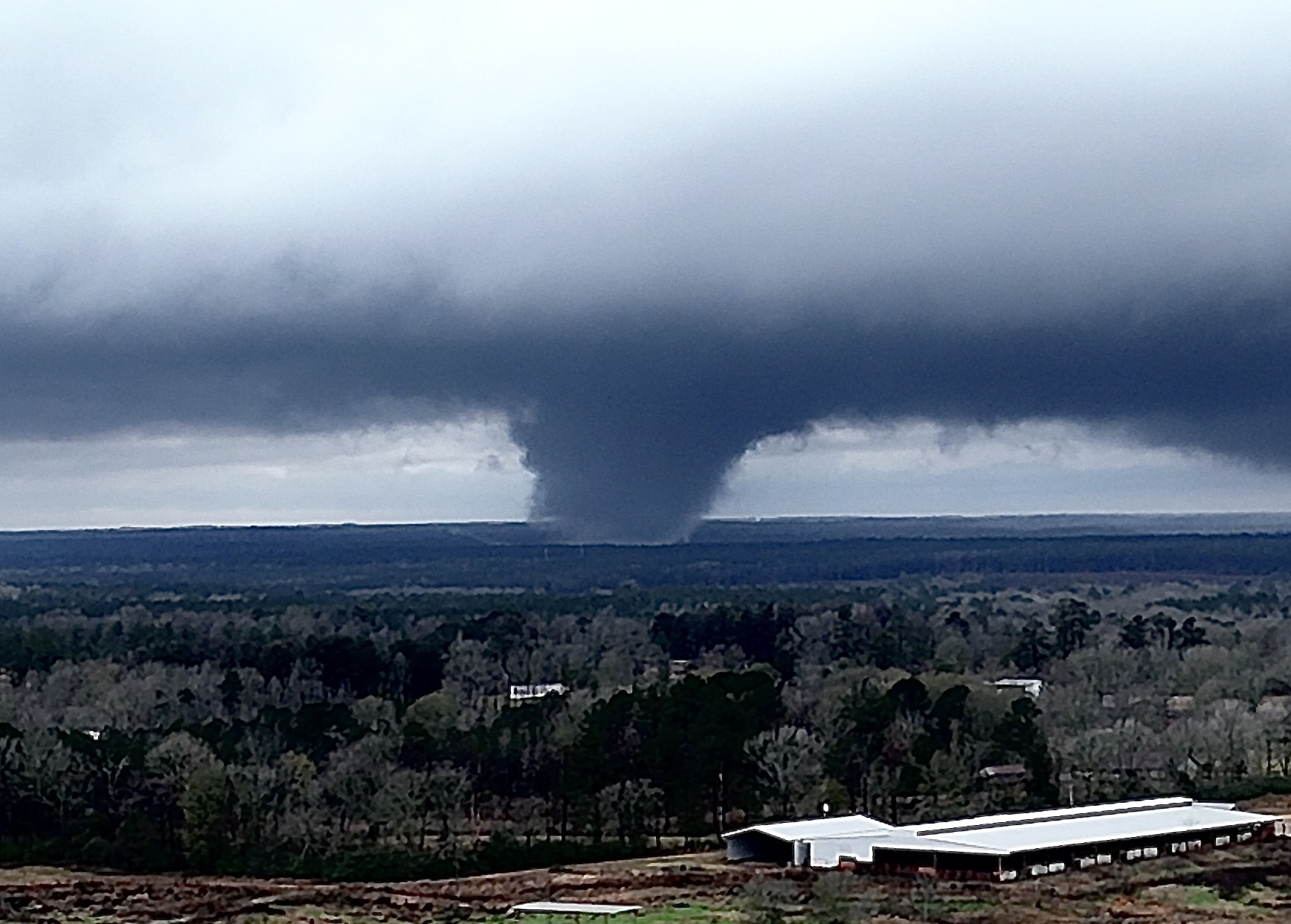
An EF3 tornado near Bude on December 28, 2024

The U.S. state of Mississippi experiences several tornadoes per year. There have been at least 2,611 recorded tornadoes since 1950. At least 586 people have been killed and 7,593 people have been injured by these tornadoes. Many tornadoes took place within the state prior to 1950 as well, but only tornadoes that caused fatalities or were estimated to have been F2 or greater intensity on the Fujita scale were recorded in this period of time.

The deadliest tornado to impact Mississippi took place in 1840, when a tornado that was estimated to have been F4 intensity struck the city of Natchez and areas to the southwest along the Mississippi River, killing 317 people and injuring 109 others. An F5 tornado impacted the city of Tupelo on April 5, 1936, which destroyed many houses within the city and killed 216 people. During the 1908 Dixie tornado outbreak on April 24, 1908, two F4-rated tornadoes impacted the state, the first of which impacted multiple plantations and mansions near the communities of Pine Ridge and Church Hill, killing 52 people and injuring 250 more. The second F4 tornado impacted the city of Purvis, where the majority of structures were destroyed and 55 people were killed. A total of 96 people were killed along the tornado's path in Mississippi.

After 1950, several more deadly and destructive tornadoes took place in Mississippi, including an F5 tornado which destroyed numerous homes and businesses within Vicksburg in 1953, killing 38 people and injuring 270 others. Another F5 tornado destroyed many structures within Jackson and areas to the northeast in 1966, including a large shopping center which was mostly flattened, resulting in 57 fatalities. The 1971 Mississippi Delta tornado outbreak produced multiple destructive tornadoes within the state, including an F5 tornado which destroyed many buildings within the cities of Delta City and Inverness, killing 37 people within the state. During that outbreak, an F4 tornado caused destruction to neighborhoods within Cary and the town of Pugh City to the northeast, killing 57 people.

Multiple destructive tornado events have also impacted Mississippi in the 21st century, including two EF5 tornadoes that were produced during the 2011 Super Outbreak on April 27, 2011. The first EF5 tornado impacted the city of Philadelphia and areas to the northeast, killing three people as several homes were destroyed. The second EF5 tornado produced on that day caused devastating damage in the city of Smithville, resulting in 16 fatalities within Mississippi. The city of Rolling Fork and town of Silver City were also impacted by an EF4 tornado in 2023, resulting in many structures being destroyed and 17 people being killed along its path.

== Climatology ==
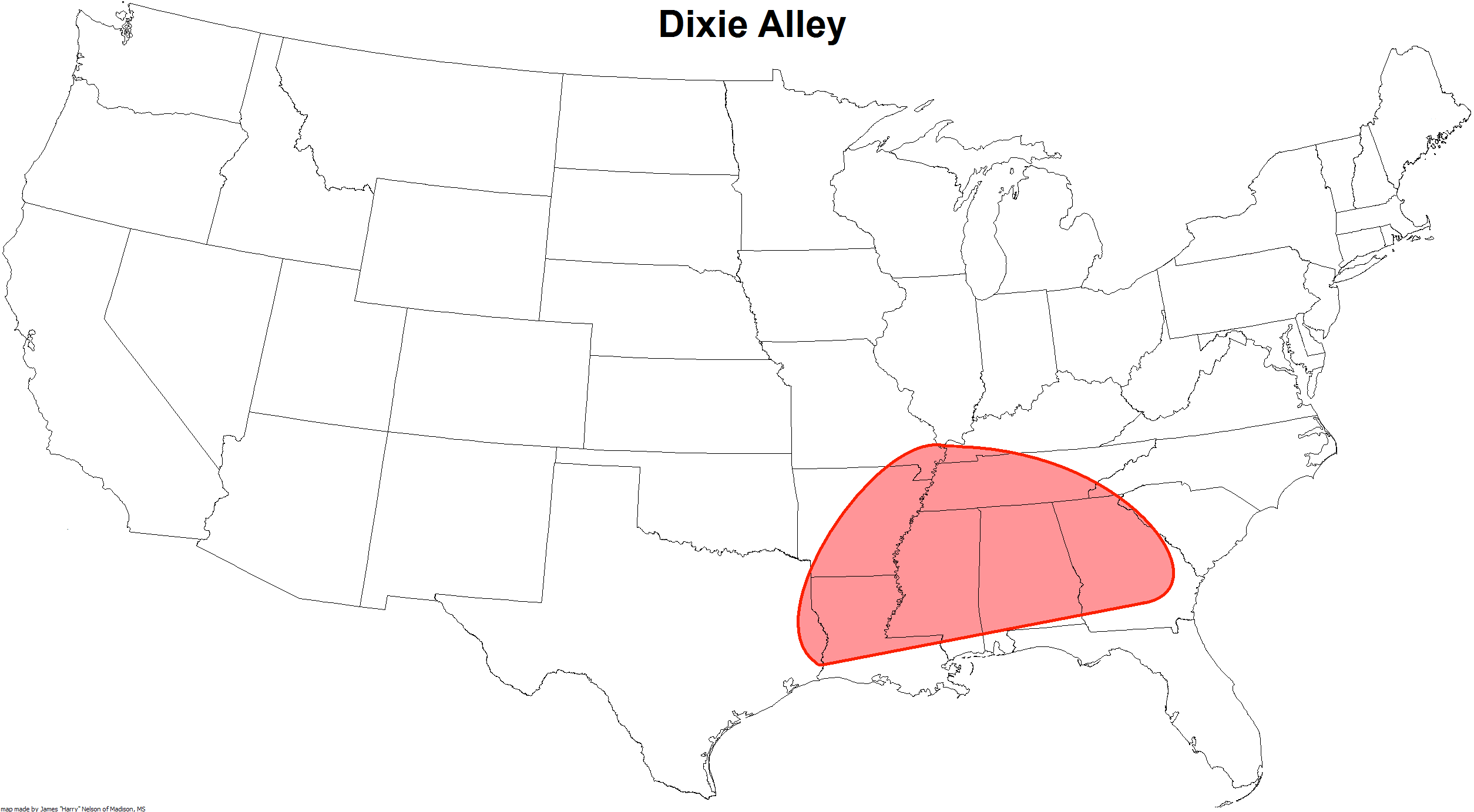
Map of Dixie Alley

Mississippi is located in Dixie Alley, an expanse of land stretching from eastern Texas to southwestern North Carolina. Tornadoes occur most frequently between 2 p.m. and 8 p.m. in Mississippi, and tornado activity is highest during the spring months of March through May, while it is lowest during the summer month of August. Due to Dixie Alley's close proximity to the Gulf of Mexico, storms in this region are often high-precipitation supercells that produce tornadoes which are rain-wrapped, making them more difficult to spot and increasing the risk of tornado-related deaths. Tornadoes in Dixie Alley are also more likely to occur during nighttime hours and move at faster speeds, making people less able to protect themselves ahead of their impact.

The number of tornadoes recorded within Mississippi is highest within the 21st century. This is partially due to improved detection and reporting of weak tornadoes resulting in the tendency of overall tornado counts to show higher numbers in more recent years.

Most active tornado years for Mississippi
| Year | Max F/EF# | Tornadoes | Deaths |
|---|---|---|---|
| 2022 | EF3 | 186 | 0 |
| 2019 | EF3 | 147 | 3 |
| 2011 | EF5 | 136 | 32 |
| 2008 | EF3 | 126 | 0 |
| 2005 | F3 | 120 | 1 |
| 2020 | EF4 | 115 | 13 |

== Deadliest tornadoes ==
Ten deadliest Mississippi tornadoes
| Date | F/EF# | Deaths | Injuries | Hardest-hit community |
|---|---|---|---|---|
| May 7, 1840 | F4 | 317 | 109 | Natchez |
A violent tornado touched down in Concordia Parish, and traveled 7 miles (11 km) along the Mississippi River southwest of Natchez. While moving across the river, 116 flatboats were thrown at the river-port of Natchez Landing. Steamboats were sunk and tossed along the river as well, including one which had a piece of its window displaced 30 miles (48 km). Numerous crews and passengers had drowned as a result of the tornado tossing and sinking the boats present along the river, and 269 people were killed. The tornado then entered Natchez and completely destroyed many of its structures. The red light district, the city's steamboat landing, and Natchez-Under-the-Hill were all described as scenes of "desolation and ruin". Forty-eight people were killed within Natchez, and a total of 317 people were killed in the tornado, with 109 others injured. It was the second-deadliest tornado in U.S. history, and it is possible that "hundreds" of fatalities went unrecorded due to deaths from enslaved people not being counted in the official total.
| April 5, 1936 | F5 | 216 | 700 | Tupelo |
This tornado impacted residential areas within western and northern Tupelo, flattening over 200 homes, many of which were well-constructed, and killed several families, including a family of 13 people. Trees were severely damaged, and pine needles were embedded into their trunks due to the extremely strong winds. The concrete Battle of Tupelo monument in the eastern part of the city was toppled and destroyed. The water tower of the city was also destroyed, and several fires were produced in the tornado's path. Debris from the city was displaced and wind-rowed for several miles across open fields. A total of 216 deaths were officially recorded from the tornado, making it the fourth-deadliest tornado in U.S. history, though this was recorded when 100 people were still hospitalized. The Mississippi State Geologist estimated that 233 fatalities had taken place. At the time of the tornado's impact, one-year-old Elvis Presley had lived in the city and survived the tornado.
| April 24, 1908 | F4 | 96 | 500 | Purvis |
This tornado was first seen near Weiss, Louisiana and had caused devastating damage in Amite City before it crossed into Mississippi. When it crossed into the state near Balltown, two people were killed in Marion County. In the town of Purvis, 55 people were killed as nearly every structure was destroyed. Of the 150 houses within the town, only seven remained standing, and 400 people were injured. The tornado then impacted multiple box cars near McCallum which a railroad work crew were using to shelter from the tornado. The box cars were tossed 150 feet (46 m) from their original location and were destroyed, killing four people. Southwest of Richton, 14 more people were killed, seven people each in two families. In total, at least 143 people were killed across Louisiana and Mississippi, with 770 more injured, making it the eighth-deadliest tornado in U.S. history.
| March 16, 1942 | F4 | 63 | 500 | Otoucalofa |
Touching down south of Berclair, this tornado killed three people as it impacted southeastern Itta Bena. Nineteen people were killed in Leflore County as numerous small homes were destroyed. Five more people were killed near Avalon, and a school bus was thrown 50 yards (46 m) into a grove of trees, injuring the bus driver and 11 children inside. Near Holcomb, a house was swept away, killing three people. A child was also killed when the tornado impacted another school bus in the area. Another house was destroyed near Cascilla, killing three more people. In Yalobusha County, 10 square miles (26 km^{2}) of forest were leveled and 19 people were killed, mainly in the community of Otoucalofa. The school superintendent in the community had dismissed schools early, but was killed when the school and his attached house were flattened. A report car from the school was carried over 100 miles (160 km) from the school, and his car was thrown 300 yards (0.27 km). In northwestern Tula, five more people were killed, including four in one home. The tornado killed a total of 63 people, injured 500 others, and caused $600,000 (1942 USD) in losses.
| February 21, 1971 | F4 | 57 | 795 | Cary, Pugh City |
This violent tornado touched down near Fitler and destroyed the Evanna Plantation south of Cary, killing 14 people there. The tornado then moved into Cary and caused near-complete destruction to Belgrade Quarters, a predominately African American, working-class neighborhood within the town, and killed 13 people. As the tornado moved northeast into Humphreys County, seven people were killed near Gooden Lake, and two more were killed at Mound Lake Plantation. Numerous small houses in Leflore County were swept from their foundation, which resulted in multiple families being killed. It then moved into the town of Pugh City, where nearly all of the structures there became either irreparable or destroyed by the tornado. Twenty-six people were killed in the town and nearby areas. The southeastern portion of Swiftown was struck by the tornado, resulting in three homes being obliterated and two people being killed. Thirty-five more structures were destroyed before the tornado reached Morgan City, where at least three more people were killed as several more structures were leveled. Two people were killed when a car was impacted west of Greenwood, and four more fatalities took place near Money. In total, 57 people were killed and 795 more were injured. The National Centers for Environmental Information and tornado researcher Thomas P. Grazulis had recorded 58 fatalities, but one of them actually occurred as a result of the Inverness tornado that had taken place shortly beforehand to the west.
| March 3, 1966 | F5 | 57 | 504 | Jackson |
This tornado touched down south of Learned and moved into the city of Jackson, where numerous homes and businesses were damaged or destroyed. The most notable instance of damage took place at the Candlestick Shopping Center, which was mostly obliterated with one wall left standing. Cinder blocks from the shopping center were strewn across the parking lot and carried into nearby parking lots, and several homes and businesses near the shopping center were also destroyed. Additionally, cars had also been thrown for over one-half mile (0.80 km), and the pavement near the shopping center was scoured as well. Twelve people were killed there, with 100 more injured. Within Hinds County, 19 people were killed, most of which were at or near Candlestick Shopping Center. As the tornado moved into Rankin County, the tornado caused major damage to homes southwest of Leesburg, where six people were killed. As the tornado moved into northwest Scott County, several houses and trees were completely destroyed near the communities of Forkville and Midway, and pavement was scoured from roads as well. Within the county, 26 people were killed by the tornado. As the tornado moved through Leake County, over 40 structures were obliterated between Madden and Salem, killing six people. In Neshoba County, the Carolina Church, which was over 100 years old, was flattened, and an additional fatality took place near Dowdville. A total of 57 fatalities were recorded within Mississippi, with 504 more injured. The tornado caused an estimated $18,000,000 (1966 USD) in damage.
| April 22, 1883 | F4 | 56 | 300 | Wesson, Beauregard, Georgetown |
This tornado touched down southwest of McCall Creek and destroyed many plantation buildings near Brookhaven. As the tornado moved northeast into Wesson, several homes were leveled in western parts of the town, killing 13 people and injuring 60 others. The town of Beauregard was directly impacted by the tornado shortly afterward, and the entire town was obliterated. Here, 29 deaths and over 100 injuries occurred. As the tornado impacted southern portions of Georgetown, an additional 14 people were killed. Eleven of these fatalities took place in two houses, and multiple churches were struck in the area during Sunday services, with three people killed in one of them. Significant tree destruction took place northeast of Georgetown before the tornado lifted in Simpson County. A total of 56 people were killed by this tornado, and 300 others were injured.
| April 24, 1908 | F4 | 52 | 250 | Pine Ridge, Church Hill |
This tornado had touched down north of Lamourie in Louisiana and devastated numerous plantations and tenant homes in Concordia Parish before crossing into Mississippi. Moving north of Natchez, the tornado killed 30 people and injured 200 others as it impacted more plantations near Pine Ridge. Several antebellum mansions were completely destroyed in this area. Near Church Hill, several more poorly-constructed tenant homes within plantations were impacted, and 21 people were killed, with 82 more injured in the area. Four more people were injured near Tillman as the tornado was dissipating. Across the tornado's path through Louisiana and Mississippi, 91 people were killed and 400 more were injured.
| April 20, 1920 | F4 | 44 | 300 | Aberdeen |
This tornado touched down northeast of Bradley and passed northwest of Starkville, where seven people were killed. As the tornado passed near Cedarbluff, ten more people were killed as homes in the area were destroyed. The tornado then moved into Monroe County and caused devastating damage within western parts of Aberdeen, where 22 people were killed. A total of 200 small homes were flattened within Mississippi before the tornado crossed into Marion County, Alabama south of Bexar. A total of 88 fatalities and 700 injuries took place across the tornado's path through Mississippi and Alabama. The tornado also caused $2,000,000 (1920 USD) in losses across the two states.
| December 5, 1953 | F5 | 38 | 270 | Vicksburg |
A violent tornado touched down in Delta, Louisiana and crossed the Mississippi River into Vicksburg, where it caused devastating damage. As the tornado moved into an industrial portion of the city to the southwest of downtown, the Vicksburg Railroad and several businesses had sustained significant damage. As the tornado moved closer towards the downtown area, multiple small houses were destroyed. The tornado then moved into the downtown area of the city, where several more businesses were completely destroyed and multiple people were killed. The tornado then impacted a theater named "The Saenger" where a wall and ceiling collapsed at a place where a family had been viewing a movie, resulting in five children dying, all under the age of 10. Continuing northeast, the tornado killed four people as it impacted a Chrysler-Plymouth dealership, a nursery school, and an intersection with Main Street. In the northern part of the city, numerous homes had been completely flattened, and three more people were killed. As the tornado moved northeast into the Waltersville community, it destroyed a church and 17 homes, and a man was killed. The tornado then dissipated as it moved into rural forest areas. In total, at least 26 businesses were destroyed by the tornado, 200 more were damaged, and 17 industrial plants were destroyed. Additionally, 275 houses were destroyed, and 300 more were damaged. The tornado killed 38 people, injured 270 others, and caused $25 million in damage.

== Intense tornadoes ==
=== Pre–1925 ===
| FU | F0 | F1 | F2 | F3 | F4 | F5 | Total |
|---|---|---|---|---|---|---|---|
| 9 | 0 | 3 | 122 | 20 | 17 | 0 | 171 |
| Deaths: 1,285 | | | | Injuries: 5,317 | | | |

A total of 171 known significant (Note: Defined by Grazulis as receiving a rating of at least F2 or causing a fatality) tornadoes impacted Mississippi before 1925, which resulted in 1,285 deaths and 5,317 injuries. During this time period, 37 intense tornadoes impacted Mississippi. This was the state's deadliest time period for tornadoes, with each tornado killing an average of 7.5 people. The deadliest tornado in Mississippi history impacted Natchez and areas along the Mississippi River south of the city, resulting in 317 fatalities and 109 injuries. Several other tornadoes caused significant loss of life during this time frame, including two tornadoes in 1908 which struck the communities of Pine Ridge, Church Hill, and the city of Purvis, as well as another tornado that moved through the towns of Wesson, Beauregard, and Georgetown in 1883, all of which killed over 50 people.

† Deadliest in Mississippi history at time of event
‡ Tornado crossed state lines in or out of Mississippi

Intense (F3+) tornadoes in Mississippi, pre–1925
| F# | Date | Deaths | Injuries | Location | County | Path length | Max width |
|---|---|---|---|---|---|---|---|
| F3 | March 9, 1722 | 0 | Unknown | Natchez | Adams | 15 mi (24 km)‡ | 1320 yd (1210 m) |
| F4 | May 7, 1840 | 317† (Note: As of January 2026, this is the deadliest tornado in Mississippi history.) | 109 | Natchez | Adams, Jefferson | 32.9 mi (52.9 km)‡ | 1000 yd (910 m) |
| F3 | March 28, 1873 | 3 | 15 | Canton | Madison | 4.9 mi (7.9 km) | 200 yd (180 m) |
| F3 | March 15, 1875 | 8 | 30 | Rienzi | Alcorn | Unknown | Unknown |
| F4 | April 25, 1880 | 22 | 72 | Macon | Noxubee | 10.2 mi (16.4 km) | 400 yd (370 m) |
| F3 | April 12, 1881 | 10 | 50 | Robinsonville to Olive Branch | Tunica, DeSoto | 35 mi (56 km) | 100 yd (91 m) |
| F4 | April 22, 1882 | 10 | 100 | Monticello | Lawrence | 12.1 mi (19.5 km) | 800 yd (730 m) |
| F3 | April 22, 1883 | 4 | 30 | SW of Natchez to NW of Hazelhurst | Adams, Jefferson, Claiborne, Copiah | 79.4 mi (127.8 km)‡ | 200 yd (180 m) |
| F3 | April 22, 1883 | 11 | 100 | N of Georgetown to N of Forest | Copiah, Simpson, Rankin, Scott | 55.1 mi (88.7 km) | 400 yd (370 m) |
| F3 | April 22, 1883 | 7 | 70 | Starkville to Aberdeen | Oktibbeha, Clay, Monroe | 31.4 mi (50.5 km) | 500 yd (460 m) |
| F4 | April 22, 1883 | 56 | 300 | S of McCall Creek to Beauregard to Georgetown | Franklin, Lincoln, Copiah, Simpson | 45 mi (72 km) | 800 yd (730 m) |
| F3 | December 13, 1892 | 4 | 6 | N of Summit | Pike | 5.9 mi (9.5 km) | 300 yd (270 m) |
| F3 | March 3, 1893 | 4 | 15 | Meridian to E of Kewanee | Lauderdale | 25.7 mi (41.4 km)‡ | 300 yd (270 m) |
| F3 | April 12, 1893 | 13 | 100 | Robinsonville to E of Banks | Tunica, DeSoto | 14.2 mi (22.9 km) | 800 yd (730 m) |
| F4 | November 20, 1900 | 30 | 100 | S of Lula to Byhalia to NE of Mount Pleasant | Coahoma, Tunica, Tate, DeSoto, Marshall | 89.4 mi (143.9 km)‡ | 500 yd (460 m) |
| F3 | December 13, 1901 | 0 | 15 | Polkville | Rankin, Smith, Scott | 15.4 mi (24.8 km) | 200 yd (180 m) |
| F4 | March 2, 1906 | 23 | 60 | Meridian | Lauderdale | 11.2 mi (18.0 km) | 150 yd (140 m) |
| F4 | January 31, 1908 | 7 | 40 | Pleasant Hill to Georgetown | Jefferson, Copiah, Simpson | 40.6 mi (65.3 km) | 500 yd (460 m) |
| F3 | February 14, 1908 | 4 | 20 | Soso to SW of Heidelberg | Jones, Jasper | 14.7 mi (23.7 km) | 300 yd (270 m) |
| F4 | April 24, 1908 | 91 (Note: Fifty-two fatalities took place within Mississippi.) | 400 | Pine Ridge to Church Hill to W of Hazelhurst | Adams, Jefferson, Claiborne, Copiah | 122.6 mi (197.3 km)‡ | 700 yd (640 m) |
| F4 | April 24, 1908 | 143 (Note: Ninety-six fatalities took place within Mississippi.) | 770 | SE of Sandy Hook to Purvis to SW of Richton | Marion, Lamar, Forrest, Perry | 154.9 mi (249.3 km)‡ | 1000 yd (910 m) |
| F4 | April 29, 1909 | 29 | 100 | Southaven | DeSoto | 125 mi (201 km)‡ | 600 yd (550 m) |
| F3 | June 5, 1916 | 4 | 25 | S of Vicksburg | Warren | 9.4 mi (15.1 km) | 250 yd (230 m) |
| F3 | June 6, 1916 | 13 | 56 | Jackson | Hinds, Madison | 15.2 mi (24.5 km) | 100 yd (91 m) |
| F3 | March 16, 1919 | 17 | 50 | W of Fitler to S of Rolling Fork | Issaquena, Sharkey | 65 mi (105 km)‡ | 300 yd (270 m) |
| F4 | March 16, 1919 | 24 | 80 | NE of Mayersville to S of Moorhead | Issaquena, Washington, Sharkey, Humphreys, Sunflower | 45 mi (72 km) | 600 yd (550 m) |
| F4 | April 20, 1920 | 24 | 180 | S of New Albany to N of Doskie | Union, Tippah, Prentiss, Alcorn, Tishomingo | 60.2 mi (96.9 km) | 400 yd (370 m) |
| F4 | April 20, 1920 | 88 (Note: Forty-four fatalities took place in Mississippi.) | 700 | N of Sturgis to Aberdeen to NE of Riggins | Oktibbeha, Clay, Monroe | 129.8 mi (208.9 km)‡ | 800 yd (730 m) |
| F4 | April 20, 1920 | 27 | 60 | Philadelphia | Neshoba, Kemper, Winston | 40.1 mi (64.5 km) | 400 yd (370 m) |
| F4 | April 20, 1920 | 36 | 200 | Bay Springs to Meridian | Jasper, Clarke, Lauderdale | 48.9 mi (78.7 km) | 400 yd (370 m) |
| F4 | April 26, 1921 | 15 | 50 | Georgetown to Braxton | Copiah, Simpson | 24.7 mi (39.8 km) | 400 yd (370 m) |
| F3 | March 19, 1922 | 0 | 10 | Bay Springs | Jasper | Unknown | 400 yd (370 m) |
| F3 | March 20, 1922 | 1 | 10 | N of Glancy | Lincoln | Unknown | Unknown |
| F4 | March 15, 1923 | 9 | 30 | SE of Tunica to Hernando | Tunica, Tate, DeSoto | 25.5 mi (41.0 km) | 500 yd (460 m) |
| F3 | March 15, 1923 | 8 | 15 | S of Marks to E of Como | Quitman, Panola | 29.5 mi (47.5 km) | 200 yd (180 m) |
| F3 | May 26, 1924 | 10 | 30 | S of Bay Springs to Increase | Jasper, Clarke, Lauderdale | 49.8 mi (80.1 km) | 200 yd (180 m) |
| F3 | May 27, 1924 | 3 | 20 | SE of Tupelo to SE of Cadamy | Lee, Itawamba | 29.8 mi (48.0 km)‡ | Unknown |

=== 1925–1949 ===
| FU | F0 | F1 | F2 | F3 | F4 | F5 | Total |
|---|---|---|---|---|---|---|---|
| 0 | 0 | 0 | 93 | 29 | 6 | 1 | 129 |
| Deaths: 537 | | | | Injuries: 3,036 | | | |

A total of 129 known significant tornadoes impacted Mississippi from 1925 to 1949, causing 537 deaths and 3,036 injuries. Thirty-six of these tornadoes were intense, the deadliest of which struck residential areas within Tupelo on April 5, 1936, which killed at least 216 people and injured 700 others, making it the second-deadliest tornado in state history. Another deadly tornado traveled over 110 miles (180 km) across northern Mississippi on March 16, 1942, which killed 63 people and injured 500 others as it impacted multiple communities, especially Otoucalofa. The town of Duncan was also impacted by a violent tornado on February 25, 1929, which killed 19 people, and areas north of Laurel were also struck by a violent tornado on March 31, 1933, which killed 37 people.

‡ Tornado crossed state lines in or out of Mississippi

Intense (F3+) tornadoes in Mississippi, 1925–1949
| F# | Date | Deaths | Injuries | Location | County | Path length | Max width |
|---|---|---|---|---|---|---|---|
| F3 | November 26, 1926 | 11 | 22 | Marks | Quitman | Unknown | 200 yd (180 m) |
| F4 | February 25, 1929 | 19 | 42 | Duncan | Bolivar | 11.9 mi (19.2 km) | 200 yd (180 m) |
| F3 | March 6, 1930 | 2 | 13 | W of Boyle | Bolivar | 2.3 mi (3.7 km) | 250 yd (230 m) |
| F3 | November 15, 1930 | 1 | 40 | N of Woodville to SW of Union Church | Wilkinson, Franklin, Jefferson | 45.3 mi (72.9 km) | 500 yd (460 m) |
| F4 | December 30, 1931 | 5 | 50 | Magee | Simpson, Smith | 19.7 mi (31.7 km) | 400 yd (370 m) |
| F3 | January 12, 1932 | 3 | 25 | E of New Hamilton | Monroe | 1.5 mi (2.4 km) | Unknown |
| F3 | March 31, 1933 | 2 | 25 | E of Brookhaven | Lincoln | 15.3 mi (24.6 km) | 400 yd (370 m) |
| F3 | March 31, 1933 | 0 | 9 | N of New Hebron | Simpson | 4.9 mi (7.9 km) | 150 yd (140 m) |
| F4 | March 31, 1933 | 37 | 170 | N of Laurel to De Soto | Jones, Jasper, Clarke | 31.2 mi (50.2 km) | 800 yd (730 m) |
| F3 | April 30, 1933 | 3 | 40 | Yazoo City | Yazoo | 10.1 mi (16.3 km) | 200 yd (180 m) |
| F3 | February 25, 1934 | 3 | 10 | Center Hill to Daleville | Lauderdale, Kemper | 10.3 mi (16.6 km) | 250 yd (230 m) |
| F3 | February 25, 1934 | 6 | 30 | S of Meridian to S of Kewanee | Lauderdale | 16.1 mi (25.9 km) | 150 yd (140 m) |
| F4 | March 31, 1935 | 4 | 10 | NW of Monticello | Lawrence | 4 mi (6.4 km) | 500 yd (460 m) |
| F3 | April 6, 1935 | 14 | 220 | Gloster to SE of Gillsburg | Wilkinson, Amite | 35 mi (56 km)‡ | 300 yd (270 m) |
| F3 | April 5, 1936 | 4 | 12 | Booneville | Tunica, DeSoto | 14.5 mi (23.3 km) | 400 yd (370 m) |
| F3 | April 5, 1936 | 4 | 7 | Coffeeville to E of Water Valley | Yalobusha | 17.8 mi (28.6 km) | 400 yd (370 m) |
| F5 | April 5, 1936 | 216 | 700 | Tupelo | Pontotoc, Lee | 15.1 mi (24.3 km) | 1000 yd (910 m) |
| F3 | April 5, 1936 | 8 | 55 | SE of Golden | Itawamba | 24.8 mi (39.9 km)‡ | Unknown |
| F3 | April 6, 1939 | 0 | 0 | NW of Moss | Jasper | 1.8 mi (2.9 km) | 50 yd (46 m) |
| F3 | September 24, 1940 | 1 | 6 | Lauderdale | Lauderdale, Kemper | 5.1 mi (8.2 km) | 500 yd (460 m) |
| F3 | November 11, 1940 | 0 | 33 | N of Mayersville to W of Hollandale | Issaquena, Washington | 15.5 mi (24.9 km) | 200 yd (180 m) |
| F4 | March 16, 1942 | 63 | 500 | Itta Bena to Otoucalofa to N of New Albany | Leflore, Carroll, Grenada, Yalobusha, Lafayette, Pontotoc, Union | 110.2 mi (177.3 km) | 600 yd (550 m) |
| F3 | March 16, 1942 | 5 | 40 | Holly Springs to NE of Atway | Marshall, Benton | 17.4 mi (28.0 km) | 400 yd (370 m) |
| F4 | March 16, 1942 | 5 | 50 | Baldwyn | Lee, Prentiss | 4.9 mi (7.9 km) | 300 yd (270 m) |
| F3 | March 16, 1942 | 0 | 15 | Baldwyn | Lee | 5 mi (8.0 km) | 200 yd (180 m) |
| F3 | November 6, 1943 | 2 | 8 | W of Vaiden | Carroll, Montgomery | 15.5 mi (24.9 km) | 500 yd (460 m) |
| F3 | February 12, 1945 | 5 | 40 | S of Meridian | Lauderdale | 9.2 mi (14.8 km) | 400 yd (370 m) |
| F3 | January 6, 1946 | 4 | 20 | W of Indianola to Blaine | Tunica, DeSoto | 20 mi (32 km) | Unknown |
| F3 | January 6, 1946 | 4 | 10 | S of Carrollton | Carroll | 13.6 mi (21.9 km) | Unknown |
| F3 | January 1, 1948 | 1 | 1 | N of Hesterville to Eupora to S of Mantee | Attala, Montgomery, Choctaw, Webster | 50.4 mi (81.1 km) | Unknown |
| F3 | February 13, 1948 | 5 | 36 | E of Newton | Newton | 5.4 mi (8.7 km) | 400 yd (370 m) |
| F3 | November 5, 1948 | 9 | 39 | Bentonia | Madison, Yazoo | 15.3 mi (24.6 km) | 200 yd (180 m) |
| F3 | November 17, 1948 | 0 | 25 | Calhoun City to Derma | Calhoun | 5.9 mi (9.5 km) | 100 yd (91 m) |
| F3 | January 18, 1949 | 3 | 17 | Caledonia | Lowndes | 4.9 mi (7.9 km) | 100 yd (91 m) |
| F3 | March 24, 1949 | 7 | 69 | NW of Mayersville to S of Indianola | Issaquena, Washington, Sunflower | 55.6 mi (89.5 km)‡ | 100 yd (91 m) |
| F3 | March 26, 1949 | 2 | 33 | Tupelo to E of New Hope | Pontotoc, Lee, Prentiss | 40.1 mi (64.5 km) | 200 yd (180 m) |

=== 1950–1974 ===
| FU | F0 | F1 | F2 | F3 | F4 | F5 | Total |
|---|---|---|---|---|---|---|---|
| 0 | 49 | 208 | 176 | 48 | 8 | 4 | 493 |
| Deaths: 360 | | | | Injuries: 3,995 | | | |

From 1950 to 1974, a total of 493 confirmed tornadoes impacted the state of Mississippi, which caused 360 deaths and 3,995 injuries. Sixty of these tornadoes were intense, and the deadliest tornadoes were an F4-rated tornado that caused devastating damage within the communities of Cary and Pugh City on February 21, 1971, as well as an F5-rated tornado which destroyed many homes within Jackson and areas northeast of the city, both of which killed 57 people in Mississippi. Several other destructive tornadoes took place during this time period. An F5 tornado impacted downtown Vicksburg and destroyed numerous homes and businesses on December 5, 1953, killing 38 people and injuring 270 others. Another F5 tornado, which was the 1971 Inverness tornado, caused devastating damage to structures in Delta City and Inverness on February 21, resulting in 37 deaths. An F4 tornado also traveled over 117 miles (188 km) across the state and impacted the city of Hazlehurst on January 23, 1969, damaging or destroying 175 homes within the city and killing 32 people along its path.

‡ Tornado crossed state lines in or out of Mississippi

Intense (F3+) tornadoes in Mississippi, 1950–1974
| F# | Date | Deaths | Injuries | Location | County | Path length | Max width |
|---|---|---|---|---|---|---|---|
| F3 | June 3, 1950 | 2 | 1 | Kosciusko | Attala | 2 mi (3.2 km) | 50 yd (46 m) |
| F3 | February 20, 1951 | 1 | 1 | Starkville | Oktibbeha | 0.1 mi (0.16 km) | 10 yd (9.1 m) |
| F3 | April 21, 1951 | 2 | 16 | W of Laurel to N of Garlandville | Jones, Jasper | 33.5 mi (53.9 km) | 10 yd (9.1 m) |
| F4 | March 21, 1952 | 16 | 74 | Byhalia to NE of Cayce | Marshall | 29.6 mi (47.6 km)‡ | 427 yd (390 m) |
| F3 | December 3, 1953 | 0 | 20 | W of Fitler to E of Rolling Fork | Issaquena, Sharkey | 18.8 mi (30.3 km) | 300 yd (270 m) |
| F5 | December 5, 1953 | 38 | 270 | Vicksburg | Warren | 9 mi (14 km)‡ | 500 yd (460 m) |
| F3 | December 28, 1954 | 0 | 25 | Laurel | Jones | 11.5 mi (18.5 km) | 250 yd (230 m) |
| F3 | February 16, 1956 | 1 | 55 | Prairie to Aberdeen | Monroe | 8 mi (13 km) | 200 yd (180 m) |
| F3 | April 4, 1957 | 1 | 75 | Magee to E of Montrose | Simpson, Smith, Jasper | 40.2 mi (64.7 km) | 167 yd (153 m) |
| F3 | June 28, 1957 | 1 | 10 | Brooksville | Noxubee | 5.4 mi (8.7 km) | 50 yd (46 m) |
| F3 | October 15, 1957 | 0 | 0 | E of Vicksburg | Warren | 17.5 mi (28.2 km) | 77 yd (70 m) |
| F3 | November 7, 1957 | 2 | 1 | S of Cruger to W of Carrollton | Holmes, Carroll | 31.2 mi (50.2 km) | 300 yd (270 m) |
| F3 | November 14, 1957 | 0 | 0 | Kilmichael | Montgomery | 7.8 mi (12.6 km) | 100 yd (91 m) |
| F3 | November 18, 1957 | 0 | 0 | De Soto | Clarke | 9 mi (14 km) | 77 yd (70 m) |
| F3 | February 26, 1958 | 8 | 26 | W of Crystal Springs to Jackson to W of Carthage | Copiah, Hinds, Rankin, Madison, Leake | 69.7 mi (112.2 km) | 60 yd (55 m) |
| F3 | February 26, 1958 | 1 | 34 | E of Harrisville to Walnut Grove to W of Philadelphia | Simpson, Rankin, Scott, Leake, Neshoba | 71 mi (114 km) | 60 yd (55 m) |
| F3 | February 26, 1958 | 4 | 20 | E of Richton to SE of Waynesboro | Perry, Greene, Wayne | 29.1 mi (46.8 km) | 100 yd (91 m) |
| F3 | January 21, 1959 | 0 | 0 | Carthage | Leake | 26.1 mi (42.0 km) | 10 yd (9.1 m) |
| F3 | January 21, 1959 | 0 | 1 | Ecru to Booneville | Pontotoc, Union, Prentiss | 33.8 mi (54.4 km) | 10 yd (9.1 m) |
| F3 | March 31, 1962 | 0 | 1 | E of Columbus | Lowndes | 3 mi (4.8 km) | 880 yd (800 m) |
| F4 | March 11, 1963 | 2 | 7 | Hesterville to French Camp to NW of Starkville | Attala, Choctaw, Oktibbeha | 45.2 mi (72.7 km) | 440 yd (400 m) |
| F3 | April 29, 1963 | 5 | 10 | S of Lula | Coahoma | 5.7 mi (9.2 km) | 440 yd (400 m) |
| F4 | April 29, 1963 | 3 | 20 | Shannon | Lee | 4.7 mi (7.6 km) | 1000 yd (910 m) |
| F3 | March 17, 1965 | 0 | 10 | NE of Alpine to S of Booneville | Union, Prentiss | 14.7 mi (23.7 km) | 400 yd (370 m) |
| F3 | March 17, 1965 | 0 | 1 | S of Columbus | Lowndes | 8.5 mi (13.7 km) | 230 yd (210 m) |
| F5 | March 3, 1966 | 58 (Note: Fifty-seven people were killed in Mississippi.) | 515 | Jackson to N of Midway to E of Scooba | Hinds, Rankin, Scott, Leake, Neshoba, Kemper | 202.5 mi (325.9 km)‡ (Note: It is possible that the tornado lifted after it impacted Leake County, as Grazulis lists a path length of 70 miles (110 km) ending within the county, as well as a separate F2 tornado that formed when this tornado would have crossed into Alabama.) | 900 yd (820 m) |
| F3 | April 18, 1966 | 0 | 5 | Biloxi to Moss Point | Harrison, Jackson | 23.8 mi (38.3 km) | 10 yd (9.1 m) |
| F3 | November 10, 1966 | 0 | 4 | Corinth | Alcorn | 3.3 mi (5.3 km) | 27 yd (25 m) |
| F3 | October 30, 1967 | 4 | 17 | Gulfport | Harrison | 2 mi (3.2 km) | 400 yd (370 m) |
| F3 | December 2, 1967 | 0 | 3 | W of Bovina to S of Kosciusko | Warren, Hinds, Madison, Leake | 82.3 mi (132.4 km) | 50 yd (46 m) |
| F3 | December 2, 1967 | 0 | 0 | SW of Brookhaven | Lincoln | 11.5 mi (18.5 km) | 300 yd (270 m) |
| F4 | December 2, 1967 | 2 | 10 | N of Forest | Leake | 7.6 mi (12.2 km) | 300 yd (270 m) |
| F3 | November 3, 1968 | 0 | 5 | Gulfport | Harrison | 2 mi (3.2 km) | 123 yd (112 m) |
| F4 | January 23, 1969 | 32 | 241 | S of Fayette to Hazlehurst to W of Newton | Jefferson, Copiah, Simpson, Rankin, Smith, Scott, Newton | 117.8 mi (189.6 km) | 200 yd (180 m) |
| F4 | April 19, 1970 | 4 | 78 | Ripley to NE of Corinth | Tippah, Alcorn | 47.6 mi (76.6 km)‡ | 100 yd (91 m) |
| F3 | April 24, 1970 | 0 | 18 | Southaven | DeSoto | 12.3 mi (19.8 km)‡ | 50 yd (46 m) |
| F5 | February 21, 1971 | 48 (Note: Thirty-seven people were killed in Mississippi.) | 510 | S of Tallula to Inverness to S of Schlater | Issaquena, Sharkey, Humphreys, Sunflower, Leflore | 109.2 mi (175.7 km)‡ | 500 yd (460 m) |
| F4 | February 21, 1971 | 57 | 795 | SE of Fitler to Cary to N of Falkner | Issaquena, Sharkey, Humphreys, Leflore, Grenada, Tallahatchie, Yalobusha, Lafayette, Marshall, Benton, Tippah | 202.1 mi (325.2 km)‡ (Note: It is possible that this tornado actually lifted within Lafayette County, as Grazulis noted a 160-mile (260 km) path ending within the county and stated that a separate tornado took place starting in Benton County.) | 100 yd (91 m) |
| F4 | February 21, 1971 | 13 | 182 | S of Bovina to Little Yazoo to W of Lexington | Warren, Hinds, Yazoo, Holmes | 65.2 mi (104.9 km) | 10 yd (9.1 m) |
| F3 | February 21, 1971 | 3 | 0 | N of Drew | Sunflower | 8.6 mi (13.8 km) | 10 yd (9.1 m) |
| F3 | May 9, 1971 | 1 | 3 | N of Carthage | Leake | 1 mi (1.6 km) | 10 yd (9.1 m) |
| F3 | May 24, 1971 | 0 | 5 | Corinth | Alcorn | 9.8 mi (15.8 km) | 10 yd (9.1 m) |
| F3 | December 10, 1971 | 0 | 5 | SW of Morgantown to W of Bassfield | Marion, Jefferson Davis | 19.1 mi (30.7 km) | 133 yd (122 m) |
| F3 | December 10, 1971 | 0 | 0 | S of Bassfield | Jefferson Davis | 0.1 mi (0.16 km) | 17 yd (16 m) |
| F3 | December 15, 1971 | 0 | 0 | W of Prentiss to Mount Carmel | Jefferson Davis, Covington | 15.9 mi (25.6 km) | 150 yd (140 m) |
| F3 | January 9, 1972 | 0 | 1 | E of Bay Springs | Jasper | 18.2 mi (29.3 km) | 100 yd (91 m) |
| F3 | January 9, 1972 | 0 | 12 | Laurel to E of Eucutta | Jones, Wayne | 23.6 mi (38.0 km) | 300 yd (270 m) |
| F3 | April 21, 1972 | 0 | 0 | N of Swiftown to N of Cruger | Leflore, Holmes | 12.8 mi (20.6 km) | 150 yd (140 m) |
| F3 | April 21, 1972 | 0 | 0 | Bogue Chitto | Lincoln | 9.1 mi (14.6 km) | 150 yd (140 m) |
| F3 | September 29, 1972 | 0 | 4 | Ripley to Booneville to Tishomingo | Tippah, Prentiss, Tishomingo | 45.5 mi (73.2 km) | 880 yd (800 m) |
| F3 | May 27, 1973 | 1 | 35 | E of Laurel | Jones | 15 mi (24 km) | 400 yd (370 m) |
| F3 | November 26, 1973 | 0 | 5 | S of Walthall to Amory | Webster, Clay, Monroe | 54.4 mi (87.5 km) | 10 yd (9.1 m) |
| F3 | November 26, 1973 | 0 | 0 | W of Grenada | Grenada | 11.9 mi (19.2 km) | 10 yd (9.1 m) |
| F3 | November 26, 1973 | 0 | 0 | NW of Crystal Springs | Copiah | 0.1 mi (0.16 km) | 10 yd (9.1 m) |
| F3 | November 26, 1973 | 0 | 0 | N of Money | Leflore | 40.1 mi (64.5 km) | 200 yd (180 m) |
| F3 | January 28, 1974 | 0 | 5 | W of Utica to Jackson | Hinds | 31.4 mi (50.5 km) | 100 yd (91 m) |
| F3 | February 21, 1974 | 0 | 13 | N of Monticello | Lawrence | 9.8 mi (15.8 km) | 200 yd (180 m) |
| F3 | February 21, 1974 | 0 | 0 | W of Magee | Simpson | 14.2 mi (22.9 km) | 10 yd (9.1 m) |
| F3 | April 3, 1974 | 0 | 1 | E of Laurel | Jones | 12 mi (19 km) | 100 yd (91 m) |
| F5 | April 3, 1974 | 28 (Note: All fatalities and F5-rated damage took place in Alabama.) | 272 | E of Caledonia | Lowndes | 79.5 mi (127.9 km)‡ | 500 yd (460 m) |

=== 1975–1999 ===
| FU | F0 | F1 | F2 | F3 | F4 | F5 | Total |
|---|---|---|---|---|---|---|---|
| 0 | 200 | 306 | 143 | 53 | 13 | 0 | 715 |
| Deaths: 78 | | | | Injuries: 1,849 | | | |

Between 1975 and 1999, a total of 715 recorded tornadoes took place in Mississippi, which resulted in 78 deaths and 1,849 injuries. In this time frame, 66 intense tornadoes occurred. The deadliest tornado to take place within this time period was an F3 tornado that caused significant damage to homes and businesses within the communities of Philipp and Yocona, as well as the city of Water Valley, on April 21, 1984, killing 15 people and injuring 76 others. On the night of November 21, 1992, a violent F4 tornado traveled 128 miles (206 km) across the state, destroying dozens of homes within the cities of Florence and Brandon, and killing 12 people. Another F4 tornado impacted the city of McComb on January 10, 1975, which impacted 38 blocks within the city. Many homes, apartments, and businesses within town were destroyed, and 9 people were killed.

‡ Tornado crossed state lines in or out of Mississippi

Intense (F3+) tornadoes in Mississippi, 1975–1999
| F# | Date | Deaths | Injuries | Location | County | Path length | Max width |
|---|---|---|---|---|---|---|---|
| F4 | January 10, 1975 | 9 | 210 | McComb to SW of Mendenhall | Pike, Lincoln, Lawrence, Simpson | 56.5 mi (90.9 km) | 200 yd (180 m) |
| F3 | February 22, 1975 | 0 | 4 | E of Abbeville to W of Ripley | Lafayette, Marshall, Union, Benton, Tippah | 26.3 mi (42.3 km) | 200 yd (180 m) |
| F3 | March 23, 1975 | 0 | 0 | Guntown to S of Booneville | Lee, Prentiss | 17.2 mi (27.7 km) | 100 yd (91 m) |
| F3 | February 18, 1976 | 1 | 27 | S of Lena to S of Pearl River | Scott, Leake, Neshoba | 27.3 mi (43.9 km) | 200 yd (180 m) |
| F3 | March 20, 1976 | 1 | 9 | E of Walthall to S of Hatley | Webster, Clay, Chickasaw, Monroe | 49.4 mi (79.5 km) | 1400 yd (1300 m) |
| F4 | March 26, 1976 | 0 | 11 | Magee | Simpson | 18.5 mi (29.8 km) | 880 yd (800 m) |
| F3 | March 27, 1976 | 0 | 0 | N of Lucedale | George | 13.9 mi (22.4 km) | 300 yd (270 m) |
| F4 | March 29, 1976 | 3 | 177 | N of Canton | Madison | 22.3 mi (35.9 km) | 880 yd (800 m) |
| F4 | March 29, 1976 | 0 | 8 | Hazlehurst to Puckett to N of Meridian | Copiah, Simpson, Rankin, Smith, Scott, Newton, Lauderdale | 126.5 mi (203.6 km) | 880 yd (800 m) |
| F3 | March 30, 1976 | 0 | 0 | S of Fayette | Jefferson, Copiah | 31.7 mi (51.0 km) | 1583 yd (1447 m) |
| F3 | April 24, 1976 | 0 | 1 | N of Clarksdale to S of Darling | Coahoma, Quitman | 24.6 mi (39.6 km) | 300 yd (270 m) |
| F3 | May 13, 1976 | 0 | 0 | N of Doskie | Tishomingo | 10.1 mi (16.3 km)‡ | 300 yd (270 m) |
| F3 | February 23, 1977 | 0 | 0 | NE of Ethel to N of McCool | Attala | 10.5 mi (16.9 km) | 100 yd (91 m) |
| F3 | February 23, 1977 | 0 | 1 | N of Edinburg | Leake | 11.4 mi (18.3 km) | 177 yd (162 m) |
| F4 | February 23, 1977 | 2 | 5 | W of Louisville | Winston | 15 mi (24 km) | 350 yd (320 m) |
| F3 | March 28, 1977 | 0 | 0 | N of Canton to SW of Kosciusko | Madison, Attala, Leake | 24.5 mi (39.4 km) | 250 yd (230 m) |
| F3 | April 4, 1977 | 0 | 0 | N of Bogue Chitto | Neshoba, Kemper | 11.7 mi (18.8 km) | 100 yd (91 m) |
| F3 | April 4, 1977 | 0 | 1 | E of Macon | Noxubee | 9.1 mi (14.6 km) | 587 yd (537 m) |
| F3 | December 13, 1977 | 0 | 2 | Gillsburg to S of McComb | Tippah, Prentiss, Tishomingo | 20.4 mi (32.8 km) | 350 yd (320 m) |
| F3 | December 24, 1977 | 0 | 0 | Sardis | Copiah | 8 mi (13 km) | 440 yd (400 m) |
| F3 | April 17, 1978 | 0 | 2 | N of Port Gibson | Claiborne | 20.7 mi (33.3 km)‡ | 100 yd (91 m) |
| F4 | April 17, 1978 | 0 | 3 | Greenville Mid-Delta Airport | Washington | 3.6 mi (5.8 km) | 100 yd (91 m) |
| F3 | April 17, 1978 | 0 | 0 | N of Utica | Hinds | 4.5 mi (7.2 km) | 100 yd (91 m) |
| F4 | April 18, 1978 | 4 | 31 | Monticello to N of Prentiss | Lawrence, Jefferson Davis | 19.1 mi (30.7 km) | 100 yd (91 m) |
| F3 | April 13, 1980 | 0 | 25 | Gulfport to Biloxi | Harrison, Jackson | 15.9 mi (25.6 km) | 400 yd (370 m) |
| F3 | May 16, 1980 | 0 | 0 | Long Beach to Gulfport to Biloxi | Harrison | 11.5 mi (18.5 km) | 800 yd (730 m) |
| F3 | May 19, 1980 | 0 | 8 | Lakeshore to Bay St. Louis | Hancock, Harrison | 13.1 mi (21.1 km) | 800 yd (730 m) |
| F3 | May 19, 1980 | 0 | 4 | Long Beach to Gulfport | Harrison | 10.6 mi (17.1 km) | 800 yd (730 m) |
| F3 | May 19, 1980 | 0 | 0 | W of Lucedale | George | 4.3 mi (6.9 km) | 150 yd (140 m) |
| F3 | January 3, 1982 | 1 | 17 | E of Newton | Newton | 11 mi (18 km) | 300 yd (270 m) |
| F3 | April 2, 1982 | 3 | 40 | Carthage to Philadelphia | Leake, Neshoba, Kemper | 42 mi (68 km) | 400 yd (370 m) |
| F3 | May 7, 1982 | 0 | 0 | E of Bassfield | Jefferson Davis | 6 mi (9.7 km) | 200 yd (180 m) |
| F3 | May 7, 1982 | 0 | 0 | Hattiesburg to Petal | Forrest, Perry | 13 mi (21 km) | 100 yd (91 m) |
| F3 | March 20, 1983 | 0 | 0 | Leakesville | Greene | 1 mi (1.6 km) | 200 yd (180 m) |
| F3 | April 21, 1984 | 15 | 76 | W of Schlater to Water Valley to NE of New Albany | Leflore, Tallahatchie, Yalobusha, Lafayette, Union | 91 mi (146 km) | 125 yd (114 m) |
| F3 | March 12, 1986 | 0 | 2 | Bay Springs to E of Newton | Smith, Jasper, Newton | 32 mi (51 km) | 123 yd (112 m) |
| F4 | March 12, 1986 | 0 | 8 | NW of Meridian to S of De Kalb | Lauderdale, Kemper | 23 mi (37 km) | 440 yd (400 m) |
| F4 | February 28, 1987 | 6 | 350 | S of Ellisville to W of Shubuta | Jones, Wayne, Clarke | 35 mi (56 km) | 1230 yd (1120 m) |
| F4 | January 19, 1988 | 0 | 1 | N of Kosciusko to N of McCool | Attala | 13 mi (21 km) | 700 yd (640 m) |
| F3 | January 19, 1988 | 0 | 0 | E of Woodland | Clay, Chickasaw | 10 mi (16 km) | 100 yd (91 m) |
| F3 | November 4, 1988 | 0 | 0 | N of Marietta to S of Paden | Prentiss, Tishomingo | 12 mi (19 km) | 150 yd (140 m) |
| F3 | November 4, 1988 | 0 | 0 | N of Iuka | Tishomingo | 7 mi (11 km)‡ | 200 yd (180 m) |
| F3 | November 4, 1988 | 0 | 0 | Winchester | Wayne | 8 mi (13 km)‡ | 200 yd (180 m) |
| F3 | November 19, 1988 | 0 | 3 | SW of Tutwiler | Sunflower | 4 mi (6.4 km) | 100 yd (91 m) |
| F3 | November 19, 1988 | 2 | 11 | E of Tupelo | Lee | 12.5 mi (20.1 km) | 100 yd (91 m) |
| F3 | March 4, 1989 | 0 | 5 | N of Clinton to E of Flora | Hinds, Madison | 11 mi (18 km) | 350 yd (320 m) |
| F3 | December 21, 1990 | 0 | 0 | E of Holcomb | Grenada | 3.5 mi (5.6 km) | 440 yd (400 m) |
| F3 | December 21, 1990 | 1 | 15 | Vaiden | Holmes, Carroll | 20 mi (32 km) | 880 yd (800 m) |
| F3 | December 21, 1990 | 0 | 0 | N of Canton | Madison | 11 mi (18 km) | 880 yd (800 m) |
| F3 | March 22, 1991 | 0 | 3 | S of Ashland to N of Falkner | Benton, Tippah | 23 mi (37 km) | 500 yd (460 m) |
| F4 | March 9, 1992 | 0 | 1 | N of Anguilla to W of Belzoni | Sharkey, Washington, Humphreys | 19.5 mi (31.4 km) | 880 yd (800 m) |
| F3 | March 10, 1992 | 3 | 57 | S of Meridian | Lauderdale | 20 mi (32 km) | 1760 yd (1610 m) |
| F3 | November 21, 1992 | 0 | 105 | E of Oak Vale to Mount Olive | Jefferson Davis, Covington | 27 mi (43 km) | 880 yd (800 m) |
| F4 | November 21, 1992 | 12 | 122 | N of Hopewell to Brandon to W of Sherwood | Copiah, Simpson, Rankin, Scott, Leake, Attala, Choctaw | 128 mi (206 km) | 880 yd (800 m) |
| F4 | November 22, 1992 | 0 | 20 | E of Mize to Newton | Smith, Jasper, Newton | 40 mi (64 km) | 1760 yd (1610 m) |
| F3 | November 27, 1994 | 2 | 0 | Magee to Raleigh to N of Montrose | Simpson, Smith, Jasper | 40 mi (64 km) | 200 yd (180 m) |
| F3 | November 11, 1995 | 0 | 2 | SW of Flora to SW of Canton | Madison | 15 mi (24 km) | 200 yd (180 m) |
| F3 | November 11, 1995 | 0 | 2 | S of Mount Olive | Covington | 7 mi (11 km) | 400 yd (370 m) |
| F3 | March 1, 1997 | 0 | 1 | N of Ellard | Calhoun, Lafayette | 5 mi (8.0 km) | 400 yd (370 m) |
| F3 | March 1, 1997 | 0 | 0 | W of Toccopola | Lafayette | 5 mi (8.0 km) | 400 yd (370 m) |
| F3 | March 1, 1997 | 0 | 0 | Thaxton | Pontotoc | 10 mi (16 km) | 400 yd (370 m) |
| F3 | March 1, 1997 | 0 | 16 | E of New Albany | Pontotoc, Union | 30 mi (48 km) | 400 yd (370 m) |
| F3 | May 2, 1997 | 0 | 0 | Tchula to W of West | Holmes | 20 mi (32 km) | 200 yd (180 m) |
| F3 | February 27, 1999 | 0 | 0 | S of Sontag to S of New Hebron | Lawrence | 17 mi (27 km) | 440 yd (400 m) |
| F3 | April 14, 1999 | 1 | 33 | S of Hopewell to W of Heidelberg | Covington, Jones, Jasper | 25.5 mi (41.0 km) | 880 yd (800 m) |
| F3 | December 9, 1999 | 0 | 1 | E of Bentonia | Yazoo | 6 mi (9.7 km) | 400 yd (370 m) |

=== 2000–present ===
| FU | F0 | F1 | F2 | F3 | F4 | F5 | Total |
|---|---|---|---|---|---|---|---|
| 6 | 492 | 663 | 174 | 52 | 14 | 2 | 1,403 |
| Deaths: 149 | | | | Injuries: 1,754+ | | | |

Since 2000, a total of 1,403 recorded tornadoes have impacted Mississippi, which have resulted in 149 deaths and At least 1,754 injuries. Sixty-eight of these tornadoes were intense, and ten of these intense tornadoes struck during the 2011 Super Outbreak on April 27, 2011. Two of these tornadoes were rated EF5, the first of which impacted the city of Philadelphia and moved through parts of Neshoba, Kemper, Winston, and Noxubee counties, causing extreme ground scouring and destruction to multiple homes along its path, and killing three people. The second EF5 tornado directly impacted the city of Smithville and destroyed numerous structures, including some well constructed buildings that were swept clean from their foundation, killing 16 people within Mississippi. On April 24, 2010, an EF4 tornado traveled nearly 149 miles (240 km) across Louisiana and Mississippi, impacting residential areas of Yazoo City and the town of French Camp, where many houses were destroyed and trees sustained significant damage. Ten people were killed and 146 more were injured along the tornado's path across the two states. Another EF4-rated tornado impacted the city of Rolling Fork on March 24, 2023, where many of the homes and businesses within the city were damaged or destroyed, including some that were swept clean from their foundation. In addition, many mobile homes were destroyed near and within the communities of Midnight and Silver City as a result of the tornado, and a total of 17 people were killed, with 165 others injured.

‡ Tornado crossed state lines in or out of Mississippi

Intense (F3+/EF3+) tornadoes in Mississippi, 2000–present
| F#/EF# | Date | Deaths | Injuries | Location | County | Path length | Max width |
|---|---|---|---|---|---|---|---|
| F3 | January 3, 2000 | 0 | 7 | E of Water Valley to NE of Myrtle | Yalobusha, Lafayette, Union | 43.2 mi (69.5 km) | 600 yd (550 m) |
| F3 | February 24, 2001 | 0 | 0 | S of Greenwood to SW of Grenada | Leflore, Carroll, Grenada | 22 mi (35 km) | 400 yd (370 m) |
| F3 | February 24, 2001 | 6 | 43 | N of Bruce to Pontotoc to SE of Blue Springs | Calhoun, Pontotoc, Union | 37 mi (60 km) | 1000 yd (910 m) |
| F3 | February 24, 2001 | 0 | 30 | SW of Corrona to S of Wheeler | Lee, Prentiss | 15 mi (24 km) | 100 yd (91 m) |
| F4 | November 24, 2001 | 0 | 48 | SW of Winterville to S of Mound Bayou | Washington, Bolivar | 30.3 mi (48.8 km) | 880 yd (800 m) |
| F3 | November 24, 2001 | 0 | 5 | Isola | Humphreys | 5 mi (8.0 km) | 400 yd (370 m) |
| F4 | November 24, 2001 | 2 | 21 | SW of Madison to S of Canton | Madison | 11.5 mi (18.5 km) | 880 yd (800 m) |
| F3 | November 10, 2002 | 0 | 55 | SE of Artesia to Columbus | Lowndes | 29.4 mi (47.3 km)‡ | 440 yd (400 m) |
| F3 | April 24, 2003 | 0 | 6 | Brandon | Rankin | 12 mi (19 km) | 600 yd (550 m) |
| F3 | November 23, 2004 | 0 | 0 | E of Fayette | Jefferson, Claiborne | 18.5 mi (29.8 km) | 600 yd (550 m) |
| F3 | November 24, 2004 | 1 | 2 | E of Stallo to S of Hickory | Neshoba, Winston | 21 mi (34 km) | 400 yd (370 m) |
| F3 | April 6, 2005 | 0 | 6 | SE of Florence to Brandon | Rankin | 15 mi (24 km) | 600 yd (550 m) |
| F3 | April 6, 2005 | 0 | 0 | N of Mount Olive to Mize to SW of Louin | Yazoo | 28 mi (45 km) | 600 yd (550 m) |
| EF3 | January 10, 2008 | 0 | 3 | W of Pickens to NE of Goodman | Holmes, Attala | 9.73 mi (15.66 km) | 1320 yd (1210 m) |
| EF3 | January 10, 2008 | 0 | 3 | NE of Kosciusko to S of Ackerman | Attala, Choctaw | 23.59 mi (37.96 km) | 880 yd (800 m) |
| EF3 | January 10, 2008 | 0 | 15 | Caledonia | Lowndes | 13.35 mi (21.48 km)‡ | 2500 yd (2300 m) |
| EF3 | February 5, 2008 | 0 | 14 | N of Oxford | Lafayette | 7.15 mi (11.51 km) | 1000 yd (910 m) |
| EF3 | May 8, 2008 | 0 | 1 | Tupelo | Lee | 7.56 mi (12.17 km) | 200 yd (180 m) |
| EF3 | March 26, 2009 | 0 | 25 | Magee | Simpson, Smith | 17.42 mi (28.03 km) | 500 yd (460 m) |
| EF4 | April 24, 2010 | 10 | 146 | SW of Brunswick to Yazoo City to N of Sturgis | Warren, Issaquena, Sharkey, Yazoo, Holmes, Attala, Choctaw, Oktibbeha | 148.97 mi (239.74 km)‡ | 3080 yd (2820 m) |
| EF3 | May 2, 2010 | 3 | 1 | S of Ashland to NE of Walnut | Benton, Tippah | 29.58 mi (47.60 km)‡ | 880 yd (800 m) |
| EF3 | November 29, 2010 | 0 | 6 | SW of Kosciusko | Leake, Attala | 9.6 mi (15.4 km) | 400 yd (370 m) |
| EF3 | January 1, 2011 | 0 | 2 | S of Durant to SW of French Camp | Attala | 23.45 mi (37.74 km) | 1300 yd (1200 m) |
| EF3 | January 1, 2011 | 0 | 1 | E of Macon | Noxubee | 9.63 mi (15.50 km) | 1330 yd (1220 m) |
| EF3 | April 15, 2011 | 0 | 10 | Jackson | Hinds | 16.53 mi (26.60 km) | 528 yd (483 m) |
| EF3 | April 15, 2011 | 0 | 5 | SW of Philadelphia to De Kalb to E of Scooba | Neshoba, Kemper | 48.52 mi (78.09 km)‡ | 1760 yd (1610 m) |
| EF3 | April 27, 2011 | 0 | 0 | SW of Lexington to S of Vaiden | Holmes, Carroll | 23 mi (37 km) | 1760 yd (1610 m) |
| EF3 | April 27, 2011 | 0 | 25 | SW of Europa to NE of New Wren | Choctaw, Webster, Clay, Chickasaw, Monroe | 58.74 mi (94.53 km) | 1800 yd (1600 m) |
| EF3 | April 27, 2011 | 0 | 8 | S of Oxford | Lafayette | 13.57 mi (21.84 km) | 440 yd (400 m) |
| EF5 | April 27, 2011 | 3 | 8 | Philadelphia to NW of Shuqualak | Neshoba, Kemper, Winston, Noxubee | 28.28 mi (45.51 km) | 900 yd (820 m) |
| EF3 | April 27, 2011 | 4 | 25 | N of Bellefontaine to New Wren to NW of Amory | Webster, Calhoun, Chickasaw, Monroe | 51.45 mi (82.80 km) | 1320 yd (1210 m) |
| EF5 | April 27, 2011 | 23 | 137 | Smithville | Monroe, Itawamba | 37.3 mi (60.0 km)‡ | 1320 yd (1210 m) |
| EF3 | April 27, 2011 | 0 | 2 | NE of Scooba | Kemper | 23.74 mi (38.21 km)‡ | 1056 yd (966 m) |
| EF3 | April 27, 2011 | 0 | 0 | S of Polkville to N of Burns | Smith | 8.87 mi (14.27 km) | 440 yd (400 m) |
| EF3 | April 27, 2011 | 0 | 0 | S of Newton to N of Hickory | Newton | 10.27 mi (16.53 km) | 440 yd (400 m) |
| EF4 | April 27, 2011 | 7 | 17 | Raleigh to Enterprise | Smith, Jasper, Clarke | 122.04 mi (196.40 km)‡ | 1050 yd (960 m) |
| EF3 | October 17, 2012 | 0 | 1 | N of Forest to N of Lawrence | Scott, Newton | 14.36 mi (23.11 km) | 880 yd (800 m) |
| EF3 | December 25, 2012 | 0 | 12 | McNeill to McLain | Pearl River, Stone, Forrest, Perry, Greene | 60.72 mi (97.72 km) | 300 yd (270 m) |
| EF4 | February 10, 2013 | 0 | 71 | Hattiesburg | Lamar, Forrest | 21.65 mi (34.84 km) | 1320 yd (1210 m) |
| EF3 | April 11, 2013 | 1 | 9 | SW of De Kalb to E of Brooksville | Kemper, Noxubee | 68.4 mi (110.1 km)‡ | 1320 yd (1210 m) |
| EF3 | April 28, 2014 | 1 | 32 | Tupelo to SE of Marietta | Lee, Itawamba, Prentiss | 30.97 mi (49.84 km) | 440 yd (400 m) |
| EF4 | April 28, 2014 | 10 | 84 | NE of Carthage to Louisville | Leake, Attala, Neshoba, Winston | 33.39 mi (53.74 km) | 1320 yd (1210 m) |
| EF3 | April 28, 2014 | 1 | 13 | SW of De Kalb to E of Brooksville | Kemper, Noxubee | 33.84 mi (54.46 km) | 400 yd (370 m) |
| EF3 | April 28, 2014 | 0 | 15 | S of Sandersville | Jones, Wayne | 10.46 mi (16.83 km) | 880 yd (800 m) |
| EF3 | December 23, 2014 | 3 | 50 | Columbia | Marion | 12.51 mi (20.13 km) | 880 yd (800 m) |
| EF3 | December 23, 2015 | 2 | 28 | NE of Shelby to E of Como | Bolivar, Coahoma, Quitman, Panola | 61.57 mi (99.09 km) | 800 yd (730 m) |
| EF4 | December 23, 2015 | 9 | 36 | NE of Sardis to Holly Springs to NE of Walnut | Tate, Marshall, Benton, Tippah | 75.09 mi (120.85 km)‡ | 1300 yd (1200 m) |
| EF3 | January 21, 2017 | 4 | 57 | Hattiesburg to NW of Richton | Lamar, Forrest, Perry | 31.06 mi (49.99 km) | 900 yd (820 m) |
| EF3 | February 23, 2019 | 2 | 11 | Columbus | Lowndes | 9.74 mi (15.68 km) | 440 yd (400 m) |
| EF3 | December 16, 2019 | 0 | 3 | NW of Liberty to W of Bogue Chitto | Amite, Lincoln | 29.28 mi (47.12 km) | 880 yd (800 m) |
| EF3 | December 16, 2019 | 0 | 0 | Sumrall | Lamar, Covington | 5.84 mi (9.40 km) | 560 yd (510 m) |
| EF3 | December 16, 2019 | 0 | 0 | Mize to SW of Sylvarena | Simpson, Smith | 18.63 mi (29.98 km) | 1320 yd (1210 m) |
| EF3 | December 16, 2019 | 0 | 3 | Laurel to E of Quitman | Jones, Wayne, Clarke | 61.34 mi (98.72 km)‡ | 1320 yd (1210 m) |
| EF4 | April 12, 2020 | 4 | 3 | SW of Sartinville to SW of Bassfield | Walthall, Lawrence, Marion, Jefferson Davis | 21.17 mi (34.07 km) | 1936 yd (1770 m) |
| EF4 | April 12, 2020 | 8 | 99 | S of Bassfield to Soso to N of Pachuta | Jefferson Davis, Covington, Jones, Jasper, Clarke | 67.43 mi (108.52 km) | 3960 yd (3620 m) |
| EF3 | April 12, 2020 | 0 | 2 | E of Jayess to SW of Rose Hill | Lawrence, Jefferson Davis, Covington, Jones, Smith, Jasper | 83.22 mi (133.93 km) | 2041 yd (1866 m) |
| EF4 | April 19, 2020 | 1 | 0 | SE of Tylertown to Sandy Hook to NW of New Augusta | Walthall, Marion, Lamar, Forrest, Perry | 53.76 mi (86.52 km) | 2275 yd (2080 m) |
| EF3 | March 22, 2022 | 0 | 0 | SW of De Kalb | Kemper | 9.21 mi (14.82 km) | 800 yd (730 m) |
| EF4 | March 24, 2023 | 17 | 165 | Rolling Fork to NE of Silver City | Issaquena, Sharkey Humphreys, Holmes | 59.41 mi (95.61 km) | 1320 yd (1210 m) |
| EF3 | March 24, 2023 | 3 | 5 | Black Hawk to Winona to N of Kilmichael | Carroll, Montgomery | 29.43 mi (47.36 km) | 1250 yd (1140 m) |
| EF3 | March 24, 2023 | 2 | 55 | SW of Egypt to Amory to E of Turon | Chickasaw, Monroe, Itawamba | 36.56 mi (58.84 km) | 1600 yd (1500 m) |
| EF3 | June 18, 2023 | 1 | 25 | S of Louin | Jasper | 6.46 mi (10.40 km) | 1350 yd (1230 m) |
| EF3 | December 28, 2024 | 0 | 4 | S of Bude to NW of Brookhaven | Franklin, Lincoln | 28.29 mi (45.53 km) | 1500 yd (1400 m) |
| EF3 | February 12, 2025 | 0 | 2 | N of Waynesboro | Wayne | 27.49 mi (44.24 km) | 910 yd (830 m) |
| EF4 | March 15, 2025 | 6 | 14 | S of Osyka to SW of Williamsburg | Pike, Walthall, Marion, Jefferson Davis, Covington | 67.64 mi (108.86 km)‡ | 1400 yd (1300 m) |
| EF3 | March 15, 2025 | 1 | 2 | SW of Tylertown to NW of Columbia | Walthall, Marion | 25.81 mi (41.54 km) | 880 yd (800 m) |
| EF3 | April 3, 2025 | 0 | 2 | SE of Strayhorn to E of Coldwater | Tate | 12.22 mi (19.67 km) | 650 yd (590 m) |
| EF3 | April 3, 2025 | 2 | 3 | NE of Red Banks to NE of Early Grove | Marshall, Benton | 39.55 mi (63.65 km)‡ | 1200 yd (1100 m) |

== Sources ==
- National Weather Service. Storm Data Publication (Report). National Centers for Environmental Information – via Storm Events Database.
- Grazulis, Thomas P. (May 1984). Violent Tornado Climatography, 1880–1982. OSTI (Technical report). NUREG. Washington, D.C.: Nuclear Regulatory Commission. OSTI 7099491. CR-3670.
  - — (November 1990). Significant Tornadoes 1880–1989. Vol. 2. St. Johnsbury, Vermont: The Tornado Project of Environmental Films. ISBN 1-879362-02-3.
  - — (July 1993). Significant Tornadoes 1680–1991: A Chronology and Analysis of Events. St. Johnsbury, Vermont: The Tornado Project of Environmental Films. ISBN 1-879362-03-1.
  - — (2001a). The Tornado: Nature's Ultimate Windstorm. Norman, Oklahoma: University of Oklahoma Press. ISBN 978-0-8061-3538-0.
  - — (2001b). F5-F6 Tornadoes. St. Johnsbury, Vermont: The Tornado Project of Environmental Films.
- Cline, I. W. (1908). Written at New Orleans. "Tornadoes in Louisiana, April 24, 1908". Monthly Weather Review. 36 (5). Washington, D.C.: United States Weather Bureau: 131–132. Bibcode:1908MWRv...36..131C. doi:10.1175/1520-0493(1908)36<131b:TILA>2.0.CO;2.
- Selden, W. S. (May 1908). "Tornadoes in Mississippi, April 24, 1908". Monthly Weather Review. 36 (5). U.S. Weather Bureau: 132–3. Bibcode:1908MWRv...36..132B. doi:10.1175/1520-0493(1908)36<132:TIMA>2.0.CO;2.
