= Tornado outbreak of March 16–17, 1942 =

1942 tornado outbreak in the United States

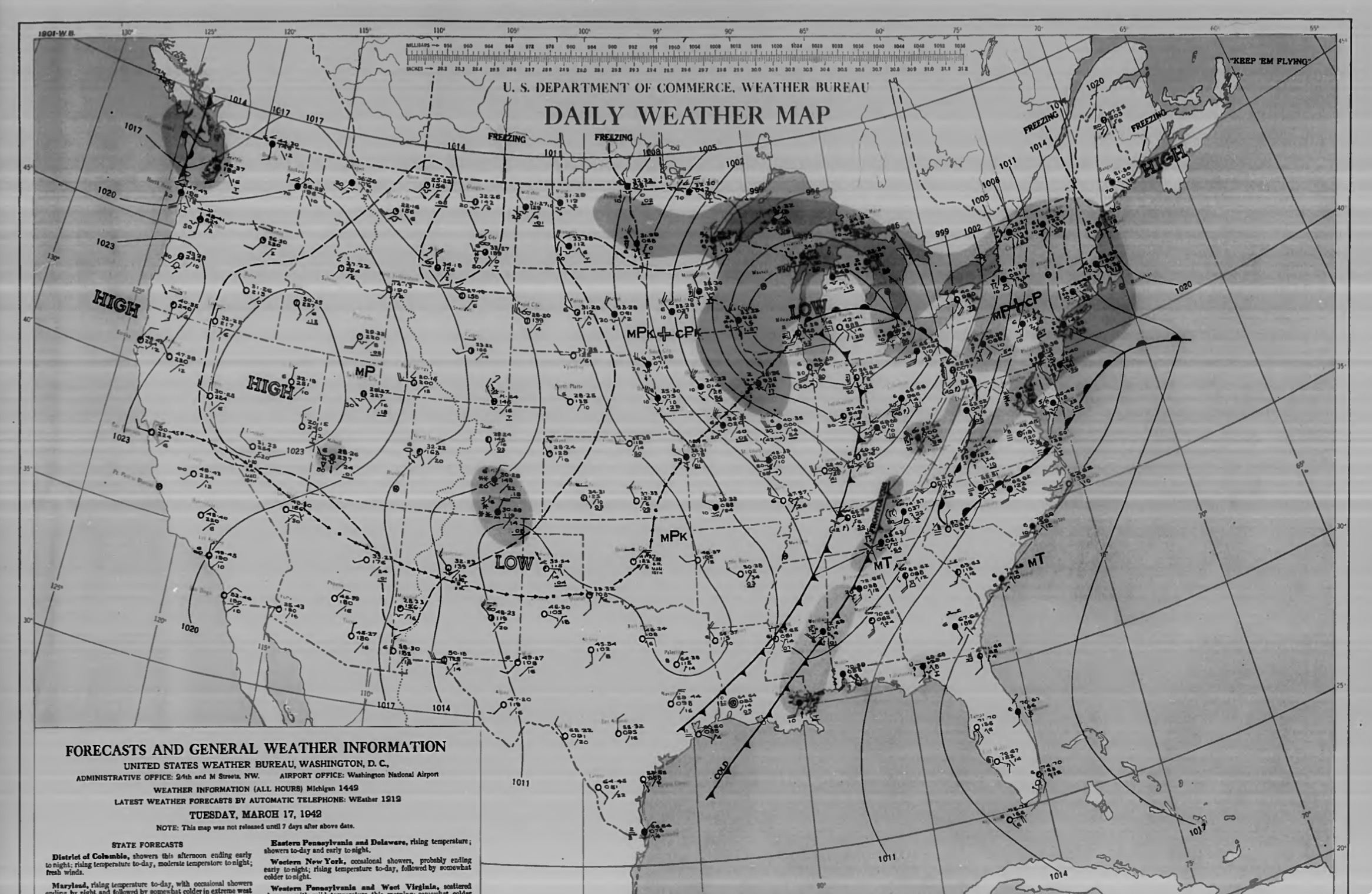
- Weather map on March 17, showing the low pressure area over the Great Lakes that would produce the tornado outbreak

Tornado outbreak
- Tornadoes: ≥ 30
- Max. rating: F5 tornado
- Duration: March 16–17, 1942

Overall effects
- Fatalities: 149
- Injuries: ≥ 1,312
- Damage: $5,265,000 ($103,750,000 in 2025 USD) (Note: All losses are in 1942 USD unless otherwise noted.)
- Areas affected: Central and Southern United States
- Part of the tornadoes and tornado outbreaks of 1942

On March 16–17, 1942, a deadly late-winter tornado outbreak struck a large area of the Central and Southern United States, killing 149 people and injuring at least 1,312. At least five states reported violent tornadoes, from Illinois and Indiana south to Mississippi, beginning with an F4 tornado in the morning in Illinois. Intense activity spread south to the Gulf Coast and north to the Michigan–Indiana border as the day went on. Seven violent tornadoes were reported, one of which was a powerful F5 in Illinois. A long-tracked F4 tornado family in Mississippi claimed 63 lives as well, becoming the deadliest event of the outbreak. Another long-lived F4 in Tennessee killed 15 more people, and a series of intense tornadoes caused 24 other deaths in Kentucky. The outbreak also produced 18 tornadoes that caused at least one death—ranking eighth on a list of similar events since 1880 by tornado researcher Thomas P. Grazulis. (Note: An outbreak is generally defined as a group of at least six tornadoes (the number sometimes varies slightly according to local climatology) with no more than a six-hour gap between individual tornadoes. An outbreak sequence, prior to (after) the start of modern records in 1950, is defined as a period of no more than two (one) consecutive days without at least one significant (F2 or stronger) tornado.)

== Daily statistics ==
Daily statistics of tornadoes produced by the tornado outbreak of March 16–17, 1942
Date	Total	Fujita scale rating (Note: The Fujita scale was devised under the aegis of scientist T. Theodore Fujita in the early 1970s. Prior to the advent of the scale in 1971, tornadoes in the United States were officially unrated. Tornado ratings were retroactively applied to events prior to the formal adoption of the F-scale by the National Weather Service. While the Fujita scale has been superseded by the Enhanced Fujita scale in the U.S. since February 1, 2007, Canada used the old scale until April 1, 2013; nations elsewhere, like the United Kingdom, apply other classifications such as the TORRO scale.)							Deaths	Injuries	Damage
Date	Total	FU	F0	F1	F2	F3	F4	F5	Deaths	Injuries	Damage
March 16	29	2	0	0	8	12	6	1	149	1,304	$5,240,000
March 17	1	0	0	0	0	1	0	0	0	7	$25,000
Total	30	2	0	0	8	13	6	1	149	1,312	$5,265,000

== Confirmed tornadoes ==
Confirmed tornadoes by Fujita rating
FU	F0	F1	F2	F3	F4	F5	Total
2	0	0	8	13	6	1	≥ 30
"FU" denotes confirmed but unrated tornadoes.

Prior to 1990, there is a likely undercount of tornadoes, particularly E/F0–1, with reports of weaker tornadoes becoming more common as population increased. A sharp increase in the annual average E/F0–1 count by approximately 200 tornadoes was noted upon the implementation of NEXRAD Doppler weather radar in 1990–1991. (Note: Historically, the number of tornadoes globally and in the United States was and is likely underrepresented: research by Grazulis on annual tornado activity suggests that, as of 2001, only 53% of yearly U.S. tornadoes were officially recorded. Documentation of tornadoes outside the United States was historically less exhaustive, owing to the lack of monitors in many nations and, in some cases, to internal political controls on public information. Most countries only recorded tornadoes that produced severe damage or loss of life. Significant low biases in U.S. tornado counts likely occurred through the early 1990s, when advanced NEXRAD was first installed and the National Weather Service began comprehensively verifying tornado occurrences.) 1974 marked the first year where significant tornado (E/F2+) counts became homogenous with contemporary values, attributed to the consistent implementation of Fujita scale assessments.

=== March 16 event ===
Confirmed tornadoes – Monday, March 16, 1942 (Note: All dates are based on the local time zone where the tornado touched down; however, all times are in Coordinated Universal Time and dates are split at midnight CST/CDT for consistency.)
F#	Location	County / Parish	State	Time (UTC)	Path length	Width (Note: The listed width values are primarily the average/mean width of the tornadoes, with those having known maximum widths denoted by ♯. From 1952 to 1994, reports largely list mean width whereas contemporary years list maximum width. Values provided by Grazulis are the average width, with estimates being rounded down (i.e. 0.5 mi (0.80 km) is rounded down from 880 yards to 800 yards).)	Damage
F3	SW of Okarche to E of Kingfisher	Canadian, Kingfisher	Oklahoma	05:10–?	12 mi (19 km)	1,760 yd (1,610 m)♯	$30,000
F3	The first tornado of the outbreak attained a peak width of up to 1 mi (1.6 km). The tornado first struck Okarche and caused minor damage in town, but did most of its damage to several rural farmsteads. In the countryside, the tornado destroyed many barns and a home, killing hundreds of farm animals. The tornado severely injured one person, but did not cause any deaths.						
F4	W of Ivesdale to NE of Alvin	Piatt, Champaign, Vermilion	Illinois	16:30–17:45	60 mi (97 km)	400 yd (370 m)	$300,000
F4	12 deaths — This violent tornado either originated as or was related to a separate tornado that developed near Bement. It moved northeast at about 50 mph (80 km/h), and generated F4-level damage at two separate locations along its path. As it passed near Savoy, Mayview, and St. Joseph, the tornado obliterated several farms. Subsequently, the tornado killed six people, including one each in five separate homes, as it impacted the western portion of Alvin. There, it destroyed or damaged approximately 25 homes, along with a church and several stores. Other fatalities occurred near Savoy, Mayview, St. Joseph, and Hope. In all, the tornado injured 60 people.						
F4	S of Berclair to near New Harmony	Leflore, Carroll, Grenada, Tallahatchie, Yalobusha, Lafayette, Pontotoc, Union	Mississippi	21:00–?	110 mi (180 km)	600 yd (550 m)	$600,000
F4	63+ deaths — See section on this tornado						
F2	WNW of Smithfield to Fairview to W of Farmington	Fulton	Illinois	22:00–?	10 mi (16 km)	Unknown	$100,000
F2	As it struck 13 farmsteads this tornado destroyed homes and barns, unroofing many of the former. In all, the tornado injured 11 people, including a teacher who had canceled school early.						
F2	N of Middlegrove to NNE of Elmwood	Knox, Peoria	Illinois	22:15–?	8 mi (13 km)	200 yd (180 m)	Unknown
F2	This tornado passed near Yates City as it affected 10 or more farmsteads, four of which lost all outbuildings and barns; however, it only managed to unroof and destroy a few homes.						
F2	S of Grenada	Grenada	Mississippi	22:15–?	5 mi (8.0 km)	100 yd (91 m)	$300,000
F2	1 death — Striking an industrial section on the outskirts of Grenada, this tornado also hit 23 homes, but did much of its damage to a factory. As staff tended to victims of the Otoucalofa F4 at a hospital, this tornado passed 20 yd (18 m) away. Four injuries occurred.						
F3	W of Holly Springs to NE of Spring Hill	Marshall, Benton	Mississippi	22:20–?	15 mi (24 km)	400 yd (370 m)	$100,000
F3	5 deaths — This tornado destroyed about 50 homes and damaged the North Mississippi Branch Experiment Station (Mississippi Experimental Farm Station) of the Mississippi Agricultural and Forestry Experiment Station (MAFES). The tornado continued northeastward to the Mississippi–Tennessee state line before dissipating. In all, 40 people were injured.						
F5	SSE of Dunlap to SE of Henry	Peoria, Marshall	Illinois	22:30–?	30 mi (48 km)	400 yd (370 m)	$600,000
F5	7 deaths — See section on this tornado						
F3	WSW of Huntingdon to E of Springville	Carroll, Henry	Tennessee	22:30–?	30 mi (48 km)	800 yd (730 m)	$100,000
F3	4 deaths — This long-tracked tornado first destroyed eight homes and severely injured 15 people in the Huntingdon area. Near Mansfield, four people died, 45 sustained injuries, and a student was injured in a school. Afterward, the tornado narrowly missed Manleyville and Springville. In all, 61 people were injured.						
F4	Bethel Springs to Beacon	McNairy, Henderson, Chester, Decatur	Tennessee	22:30–?	45 mi (72 km)	800 yd (730 m)	$400,000
F4	15 deaths — This violent, long-lived tornado mostly affected sparsely populated areas, but obliterated homes, farmsteads, and tracts of forested land. It killed eight people almost immediately as it touched down and caused four more deaths near Reagan. Other deaths were reported east of Finger, near Enville, and near Beacon. Many small homes were flattened. 200 injuries occurred.						
F2	WNW of Bolivar	Hardeman	Tennessee	22:30–?	Unknown	Unknown	Unknown
F2	This tornado struck the Western Mental Health Institute, known then as Western State Hospital, and unroofed a number of buildings there. Broken glass injured 12 patients.						
F3	SE of Hornsby	Hardeman, McNairy	Tennessee	22:45–?	8 mi (13 km)	Unknown	$40,000
F3	This tornado injured five people and destroyed a total of eight homes.						
F3	W of Lincoln to SSE of Evans	Lincoln	Illinois	23:00–?	5 mi (8.0 km)	400 yd (370 m)	$25,000
F3	2 deaths – This tornado destroyed six barns and three homes, one of which received "near-F4" damage. A couple sustained severe injuries and later died. In all, three people were injured.						
F2	S of Ofahoma to Carthage	Leake	Mississippi	23:00–?	16 mi (26 km)	Unknown	Unknown
F2	1 death – This tornado produced intermittent damage along its path. In Carthage, the tornado destroyed several small homes, a sizeable church, and barns. 10 injuries were reported.						
F2	Shelbyville to NE of Lewisville	Shelby, Rush, Henry	Indiana	23:00–?	30 mi (48 km)	400 yd (370 m)	$300,000
F2	As this tornado touched down on the southern side of Shelbyville, it injured seven people and damaged homes, factories, and a hatchery. Intermittent damage occurred elsewhere, primarily on the eastern outskirts of Mays and near Lewisville. Near the latter, a number of cattle died and a barn was destroyed.						
F4	Northern Baldwyn (1st tornado)	Lee, Prentiss	Mississippi	23:05–?	5 mi (8.0 km)	300 yd (270 m)	$250,000
F4	5 deaths – This was one of two powerful tornadoes to strike Baldwyn in close succession. It damaged or destroyed more than 50 homes, several of which were leveled; F4 damage only occupied a limited area, however. 50 injuries occurred. A separate but related tornado may have caused an additional fatality near Verona, but this could not be confirmed.						
F2	W of Standing Rock to S of Dover	Stewart	Tennessee	23:30–?	9 mi (14 km)	Unknown	Unknown
F2	1 death – This tornado was related to the Huntingdon F3. Near Stribling, south of Short Creek, it removed soil and swept away a home, killing a youth inside. Seven other people were injured there. Eight rural farms were also destroyed across Stewart County, near Lick Creek.						
F3	Downtown Baldwyn (2nd tornado)	Lee, Prentiss	Mississippi	23:40–?	5 mi (8.0 km)	200 yd (180 m)	$750,000
F3	This tornado closely followed the first event in Baldwin, but produced greater losses than the latter, owing to its having struck the center of town. The tornado damaged or destroyed homes, schools, and businesses before ending as a downburst. 15 injuries occurred.						
F3	SE of Greenville to E of Drakesboro	Muhlenberg	Kentucky	23:40–?	10 mi (16 km)	300 yd (270 m)	$300,000
F3	11 deaths – This intense tornado obliterated 12 small homes in Browder and killed 10 people in town, five of whom perished in one family. A final death occurred on a farm near Drakesboro. 50 injuries occurred.						
F3	Waterloo	Lauderdale	Alabama	00:00–?	1.5 mi (2.4 km)	400 yd (370 m)	$35,000
F3	2 deaths – This short-lived tornado damaged or destroyed 24 homes. The bodies of the dead were found 200 yd (180 m) from their home. 30 injuries occurred.						
F4	N of Caneyville to N of Summit	Grayson, Hardin	Kentucky	00:15–?	30 mi (48 km)	200 yd (180 m)	$150,000
F4	9 deaths – This powerful tornado, which formed from the same storm as the Browder F3, injured 40 people as it tracked near Millwood, Leitchfield, Clarkson, and Summit. Approximately 20 homes were destroyed, several of which were obliterated.						
F3	SSW of McEwen	Humphreys	Tennessee	00:30–?	Unknown	150 yd (140 m)	Unknown
F3	2 deaths – This tornado injured 10 people and destroyed six homes as it passed near Hurricane Creek, a tributary of the Duck River, and Bold Spring.						
F3	SW of Hickory Point to Oak Plains to WNW of Coopertown	Montgomery, Cheatham, Robertson	Tennessee	00:30–?	15 mi (24 km)	800 yd (730 m)	$100,000
F3	1 death – This tornado destroyed a total of at least 24 barns and homes. Many chickens were killed, 20 people were injured.						
F3	N of Bardstown	Nelson	Kentucky	01:30–?	15 mi (24 km)	200 yd (180 m)	$70,000
F3	4 deaths – This tornado flattened rural homes as it tracked from near Deatsville to Coxs Creek. 40 injuries occurred.						
FU	W of Five Points to W of Fall River	Lawrence	Tennessee	01:30–?	Unknown	Unknown	$45,000
FU	A "devastating" tornado severely damaged or destroyed outbuildings, barns, and homes. Rural roads were clogged with debris, left impassible.						
F3	Goodspring to Diana	Giles	Tennessee	02:00–?	20 mi (32 km)	150 yd (140 m)	$150,000
F3	2 deaths – This tornado damaged or destroyed 24 homes as it struck Diana.						
F2	SW of Plymouth	Marshall	Indiana	02:15–?	Unknown	Unknown	Unknown
F2	This short-lived tornado destroyed a barn and injured two people beside the Yellow River.						
F4	SE of Goshen	Elkhart	Indiana	02:32–?	10 mi (16 km)	200 yd (180 m)	$500,000
F4	2 deaths – This violent tornado destroyed or damaged 87 homes on the outskirts of Goshen. As the tornado neared the end of its life, it narrowed and intensified to F4-level intensity. As it did so, it obliterated a home and caused two deaths. In all, 53 injuries occurred.						
FU	W of Findlay	Shelby	Illinois	Unknown	Unknown	Unknown	Unknown
FU	A tornado was reported.						

=== March 17 event ===
Confirmed tornadoes – Tuesday, March 17, 1942
F#	Location	County / Parish	State	Time (UTC)	Path length	Width	Damage
F3	Between Norway and Springfield	Orangeburg	South Carolina	23:30–?	10 mi (16 km)	400 yd (370 m)	$25,000
F3	This tornado injured seven people as it destroyed or damaged 15 homes.						

=== Greenwood–O'Tuckalofa, Mississippi ===
Greenwood–O'Tuckalofa, Mississippi
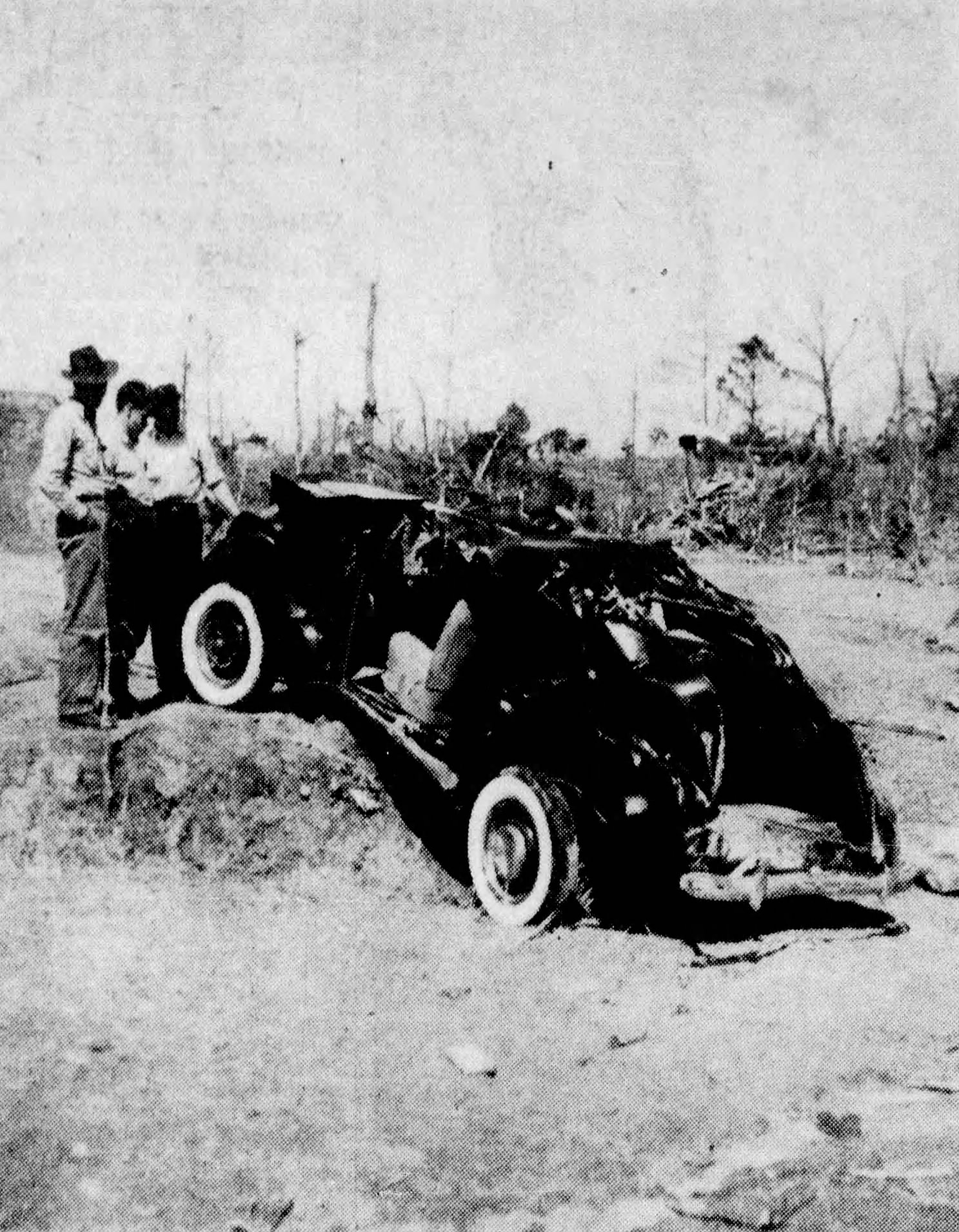
- Damage to a vehicle near O'Tuckalofa

Meteorological history
- Formed: March 16, 1942, 4:00 p.m. CDT (UTC−05:00)

F4 tornado
- on the Fujita scale

Overall effects
- Casualties: ≥ 63 fatalities, 500 injuries
- Damage: $600,000 ($11,820,000 in 2025 USD)

This long-tracked tornado family caused at least 19 deaths in Leflore County as it leveled many small homes. Three of the fatalities occurred near Itta Bena and Greenwood. In Carroll County, the tornado caused five additional deaths near Avalon. The tornado also impacted and hurled a school bus for 50 yd (46 m); 11 children and the driver sustained injuries. As it traversed Grenada County, the tornado struck another school bus and killed a child. Nearby, the tornado obliterated a house and claimed three more lives. Three other people died in another home near Cascilla in Tallahatchie County. The tornado generated its worst damage in Otoucalofa, known then as O'Tuckalofa, near Water Valley. In this area, the tornado destroyed 10 mi^{2} (26 km^{2}) of timber and killed 19 people, including the school superintendent, whose home and school were leveled and whose car was moved 300 yd (900 ft). Northwest of Tula, five more deaths occurred, four of which took place in a single home. In all, the tornado injured 500 people and caused $600,000 in losses.

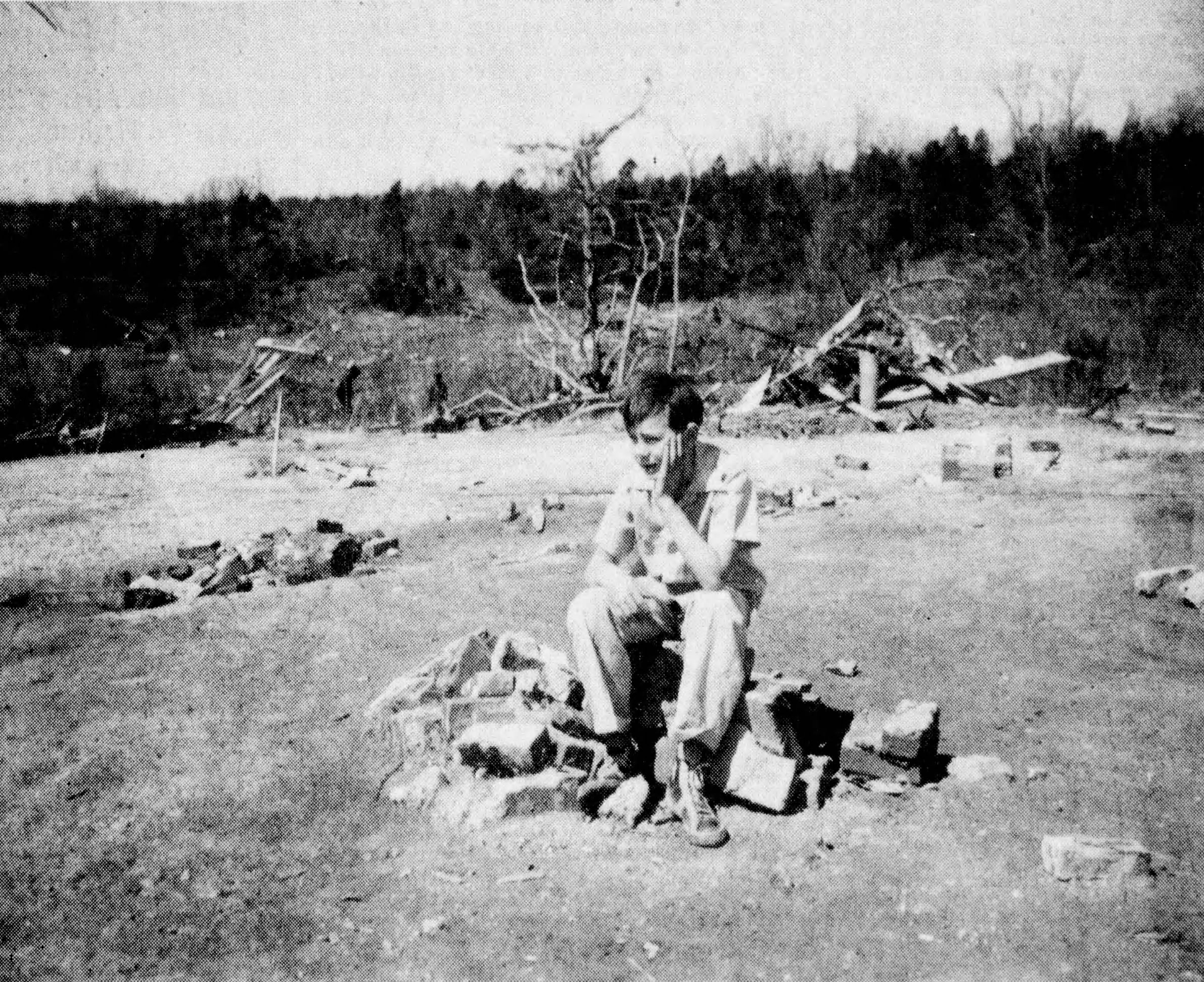
A boy sitting in the remains of a school in O'Tuckalofa

=== Chillicothe–Lacon, Illinois ===
Chillicothe–Lacon, Illinois
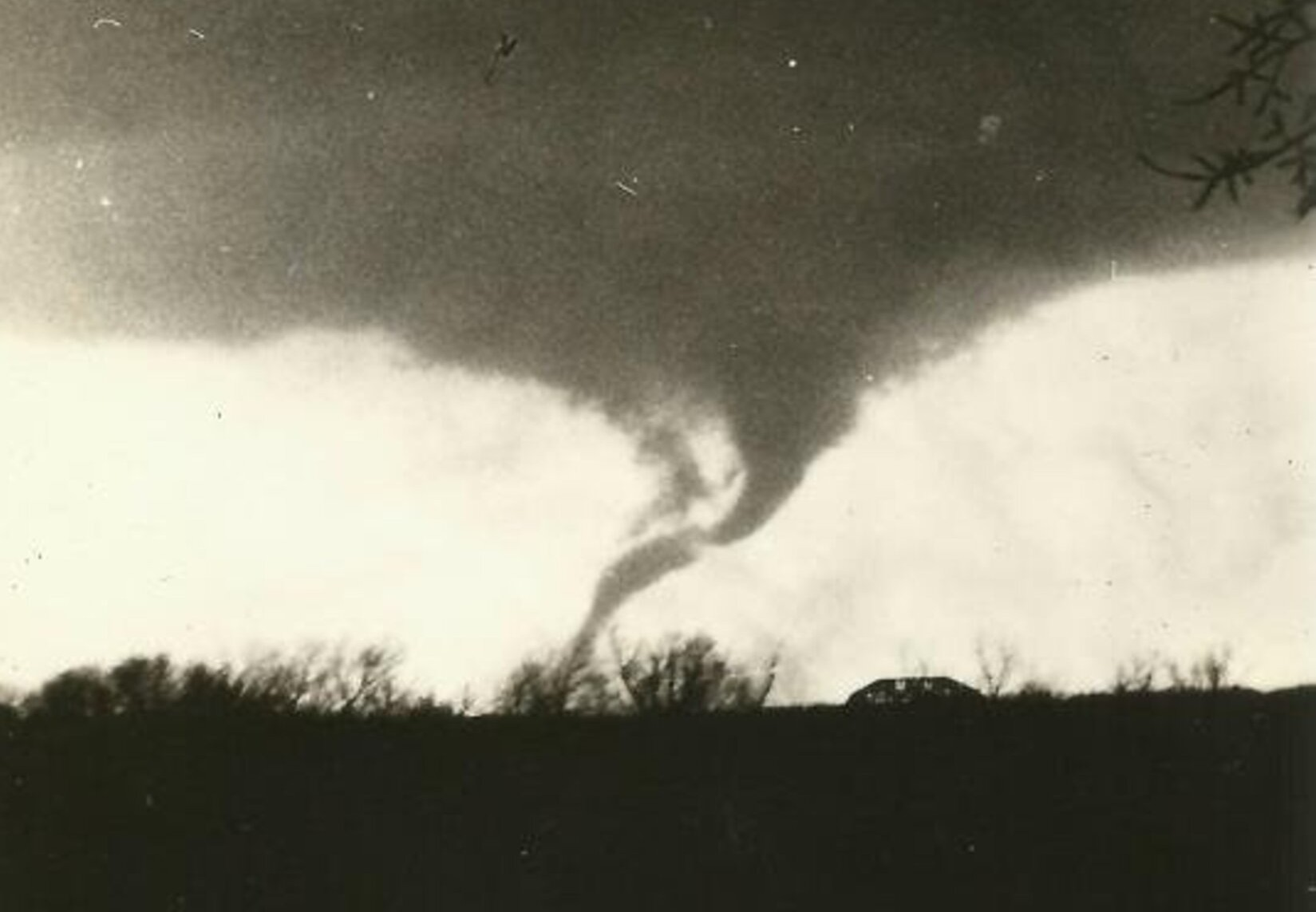
- The tornado as it was near Chillicothe.

Meteorological history
- Formed: March 16, 1942, 5:30 p.m. CDT (UTC−05:00)

F5 tornado
- on the Fujita scale

Overall effects
- Casualties: 7 fatalities, 70 injuries
- Damage: $600,000 ($11,820,000 in 2025 USD)

This violent tornado remains the most recent F5 or EF5 tornado on record in Central Illinois. It touched down east of Kickapoo and impacted areas near Alta and on the northwestern outskirts of Chillicothe. The tornado subsequently struck the settlement of Barrville, beside the Illinois River, before crossing the river to the south of Sparland. Near the river, the tornado caused one fatality. The tornado intensified to its peak intensity as it entered Lacon; although it bypassed the business district, the tornado destroyed a quarter of the town, which inclusively totaled about 60 homes, several of which were entirely swept away. Three deaths occurred in Lacon. About 3 mi (4.8 km) farther on to the northeast, the tornado produced F5-level damage to a farmhouse and killed three people there. The tornado also lofted debris from Lacon for a total distance of up to 25 mi (40 km). Two schools in Lacon received extensive damage as well, and a home in town was uplifted and deposited in a neighboring yard. Along the entire path, about 70 injuries occurred, along with $600,000 in losses.

== See also ==
- List of North American tornadoes and tornado outbreaks
- List of tornado-related deaths at schools
- Tornado outbreak of March 31 – April 1, 2023 — Spawned an EF3 tornado that also struck Bethel Springs

== Sources ==
- Agee, Ernest M.; Childs, Samuel (June 1, 2014). "Adjustments in Tornado Counts, F-Scale Intensity, and Path Width for Assessing Significant Tornado Destruction". Journal of Applied Meteorology and Climatology. 53 (6). American Meteorological Society: 1494–1505. Bibcode:2014JApMC..53.1494A. doi:10.1175/JAMC-D-13-0235.1.
- Brooks, Harold E. (April 2004). "On the Relationship of Tornado Path Length and Width to Intensity". Weather and Forecasting. 19 (2): 310–19. Bibcode:2004WtFor..19..310B. doi:10.1175/1520-0434(2004)019<0310:OTROTP>2.0.CO;2.
- Cook, A. R.; Schaefer, J. T. (August 2008). "The Relation of El Niño–Southern Oscillation (ENSO) to Winter Tornado Outbreaks". Monthly Weather Review. 136 (8): 3121–3137. Bibcode:2008MWRv..136.3121C. doi:10.1175/2007MWR2171.1.
- Edwards, Roger; LaDue, James G.; Ferree, John T.; Scharfenberg, Kevin; Maier, Chris; Coulbourne, William L. (May 1, 2013). "Tornado Intensity Estimation: Past, Present, and Future". Bulletin of the American Meteorological Society. 94 (5). American Meteorological Society: 641–653. Bibcode:2013BAMS...94..641E. doi:10.1175/BAMS-D-11-00006.1.
- Grazulis, Thomas P. (May 1984). Violent Tornado Climatography, 1880–1982. OSTI (Technical report). NUREG. Washington, D.C.: Nuclear Regulatory Commission. OSTI 7099491. CR-3670.
  - — (November 1990). Significant Tornadoes 1880–1989. Vol. 2. St. Johnsbury, Vermont: The Tornado Project of Environmental Films. ISBN 1-879362-02-3.
  - — (July 1993). Significant Tornadoes 1680–1991: A Chronology and Analysis of Events. St. Johnsbury, Vermont: The Tornado Project of Environmental Films. ISBN 1-879362-03-1.
  - — (2001a). The Tornado: Nature's Ultimate Windstorm. Norman: University of Oklahoma Press. ISBN 978-0-8061-3538-0.
  - — (2001b). F5-F6 Tornadoes. St. Johnsbury, Vermont: The Tornado Project of Environmental Films.
- Holcomb, E. W. (March 1942). Written at Springfield, Illinois. "Tornadoes of March 16, 1942". Illinois section. Climatological Data. Illinois. 47 (3). Asheville, North Carolina: National Climatic Data Center: 13. Archived from the original on April 16, 2014.
- Houston County Historical Society (1995). History of Houston County, Tennessee 1871–1996. Turner Publishing Company. ISBN 1-56311-194-2.
- Stapp, Catherine; Bowman, W. I. (1968). History Under Our Feet: the Story of Vermilion County, Illinois. Danville, Illinois: Interstate Printers and Publishers, Inc. ASIN B002T9WTMC.
- U.S. Weather Bureau (March 1942). "Severe Local Storms, March 1942" (PDF). Monthly Weather Review (FTP). Washington, D.C. p. 61. Bibcode:1942MWRv...70Q..61.. doi:10.1175/1520-0493(1942)070<0061:SLSM>2.0.CO;2 – via American Meteorological Society. (To view documents see Help:FTP)
- Wahlgren, H. F. (March 1942). Written at Oklahoma City. "Tornadoes". Oklahoma section. Climatological Data. 51 (3). Asheville, North Carolina: National Climatic Data Center: 13.
- Wilson, John W.; Changnon, Stanley A. (1971). Illinois Tornadoes (PDF) (Technical report). Illinois State Water Survey. Urbana, Illinois: State of Illinois Department of Registration and Education. 103.
