= William Cousins (judge) =

American judge

Illinois Appellate Court Judge
- In office 1992 – 2002

Illinois Circuit Court Judge
- In office 1976 – 1992

Chicago Alderman from the 8th ward
- In office 1967 – 1976
- Preceded by: James A. Condon
- Succeeded by: Marian Humes

Personal details
- Born: October 6, 1927 Swiftown, Mississippi, U.S.
- Died: January 20, 2018 (aged 90) Chicago, Illinois, U.S.
- Resting place: United States; Chicago, Il
- Party: Democratic (1964-2018); Republican (until 1964)
- Spouse: Hiroko
- Children: 4
- Education: University of Illinois (BA); Harvard Law School (JD)
- Profession: Attorney; Judge

Military service
- Allegiance: United States
- Branch/service: United States Army
- Years of service: 1951–1976
- Rank: Lieutenant colonel
- Unit: United States Army Reserve (1953-1976)

William Cousins Jr. (October 29, 1927 – January 20, 2018) was an American lawyer, judge, and member of the Chicago City Council.

== Early life ==
Cousins was born in Swiftown, Mississippi, and was an African-American. He moved with his family to Memphis, Tennessee. Cousins and his family then moved to Chicago, Illinois. He graduated from DuSable High School in Chicago, in 1945. Cousins received his bachelor's degree in political science, from University of Illinois in 1948 and his Juris Doctor degree from Harvard Law School in 1951. He served in the United States Army during World War II and was a commissioned a lieutenant colonel. He practiced law in Chicago and served as a Cook County assistant state's attorney.

== Chicago City Council ==
Cousins was a Republican, but left the party during the 1964 elections after the nomination of Barry Goldwater, an opponent of the Civil Rights Act of 1964 and became a Democrat. In 1967, he defeated incumbent James A. Condon. During his time on the City Council, Cousins was considered an opponent of the Democratic political machine that was led by Richard J. Daley. Cousins served on the Chicago City Council from 1967 to 1976. He was succeeded by Marian Humes, an ally of John Stroger.

== Judicial career ==
He then served as an Illinois Circuit Court judge from 1976 to 1992. In 1979, he ruled the death penalty was unconstitutional. In 1992, he was elected to the Illinois Appellate Court and served until 2002.

== Retirement and death ==
Cousins died at the University of Chicago Hospital in Chicago, Illinois.
