= Midway, Scott County, Mississippi =

Midway, Mississippi
- Unincorporated community
- Location within Mississippi Location within the United States
- Coordinates: 32°32′47″N 89°31′54″W
- Country: United States
- State: Mississippi
- County: Scott
- Elevation: 449 ft (137 m)
- Time zone: UTC-6 (Central (CST))
  - Summer (DST): UTC-5 (CDT)
- Area codes: 601 & 769
- GNIS feature ID: 693955

Midway is an unincorporated community in Scott County, Mississippi, United States. Midway is located at the junction of Midway Road and Midway-Odom Road 5.25 miles (8.45 km) west-southwest of Walnut Grove.

The Midway High School, (also known as North Scott High) was originally founded in the 1860s. The building was eventually replaced with a Rosenwald School building prior to closing in the 1970s.

Midway is served by the Midway Volunteer Fire Department.
