= Swiftown, Mississippi =

- Unincorporated community
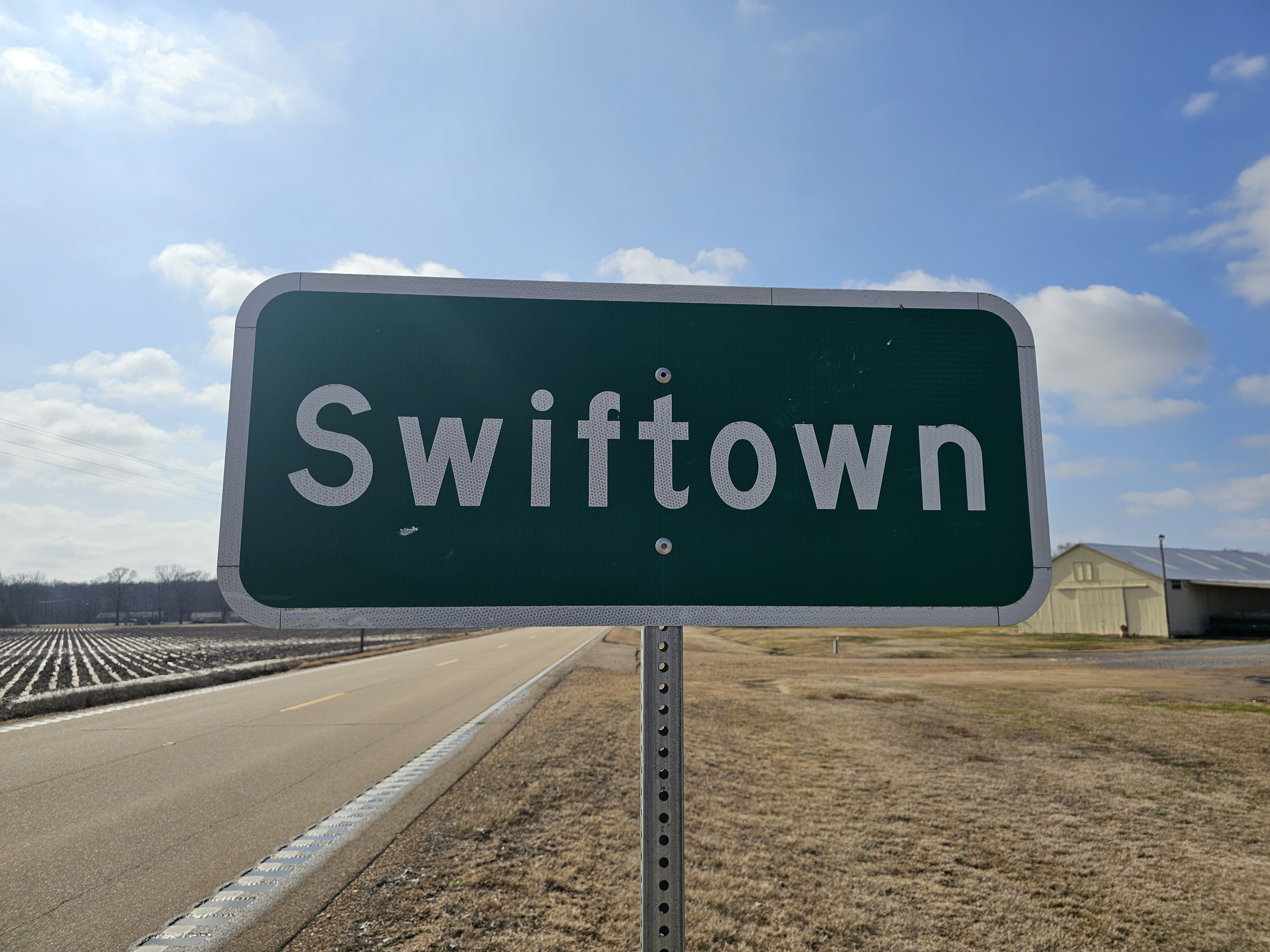

- Location within Mississippi Location within the United States
- Coordinates: 33°18′20″N 90°25′30″W
- Country: United States
- State: Mississippi
- County: Leflore
- Elevation: 118 ft (36 m)
- Time zone: UTC-6 (Central (CST))
  - Summer (DST): UTC-5 (CDT)
- ZIP code: 38959
- Area code: 662
- GNIS feature ID: 678502

Swiftown (also known as Ezra), is an unincorporated community located in Leflore County, Mississippi, United States. Swiftown is approximately 7 miles (11 km) south of Morgan City, 10 miles (16 km) north of Belzoni and 14 miles (23 km) southeast of Moorhead along Mississippi Highway 7. It is part of the Greenwood, Mississippi micropolitan area. Swiftown's ZIP code is 38959.

Swiftown is located on the former Columbus and Greenville Railroad. A post office operated under the name Ezra from 1886 to 1911 and began operating under the name Swiftown in 1911.

== Notable person ==
- William Cousins (1927-2018), Illinois Appellate Court judge and Chicago City Council member, was born in Swiftown.

== Gallery ==
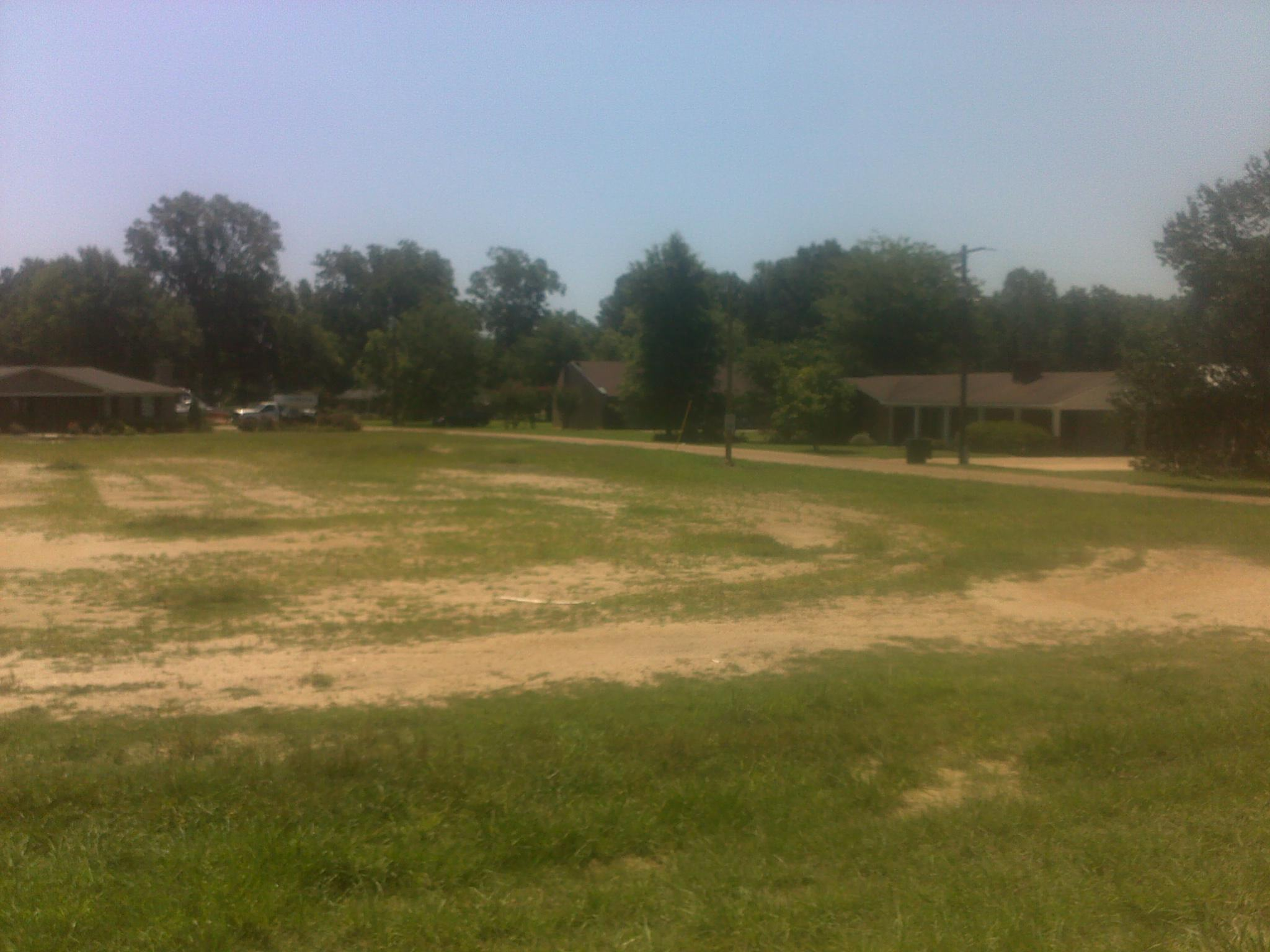
View of the community from Mississippi Highway 7

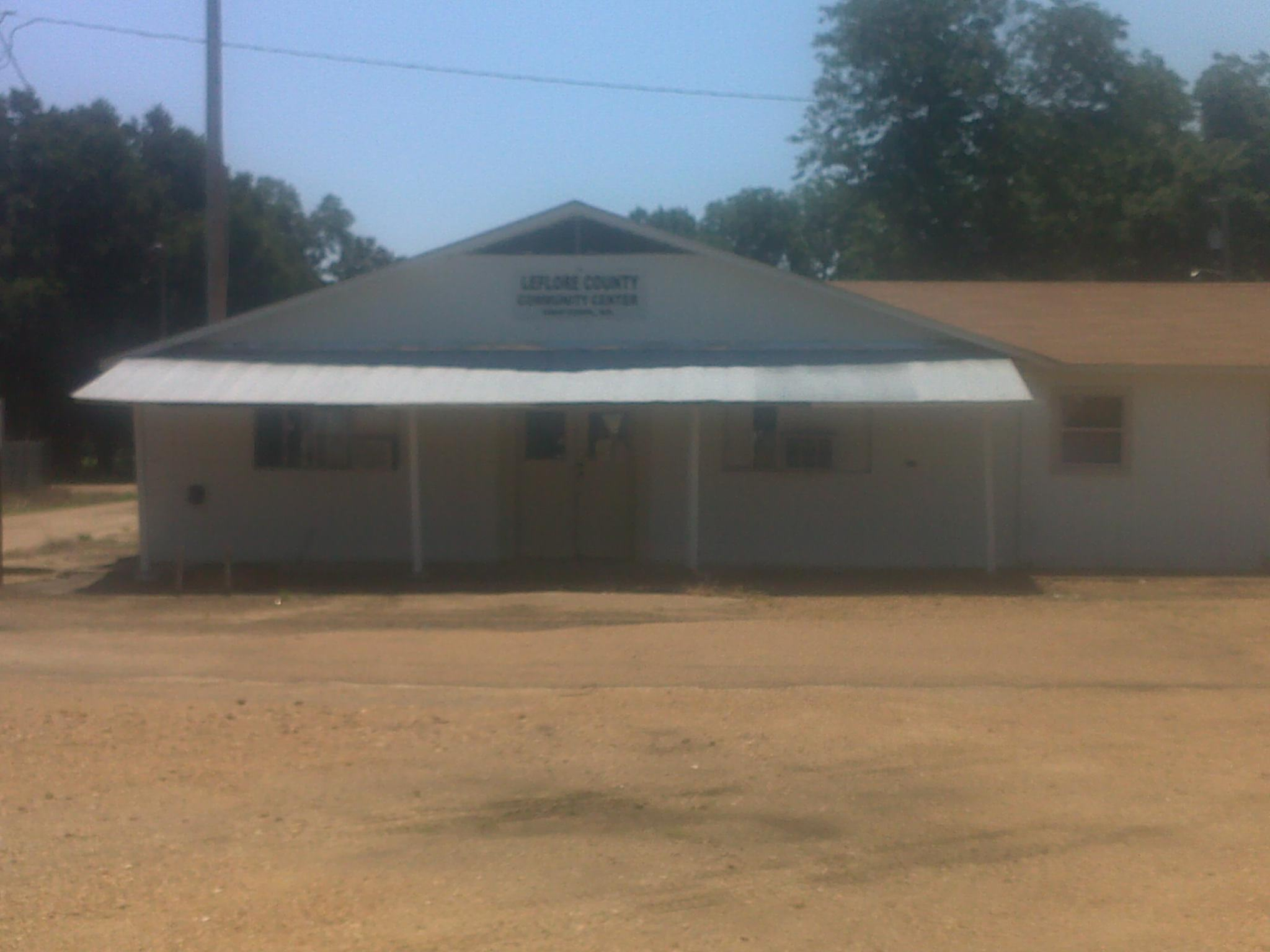
Community Center in Swiftown.

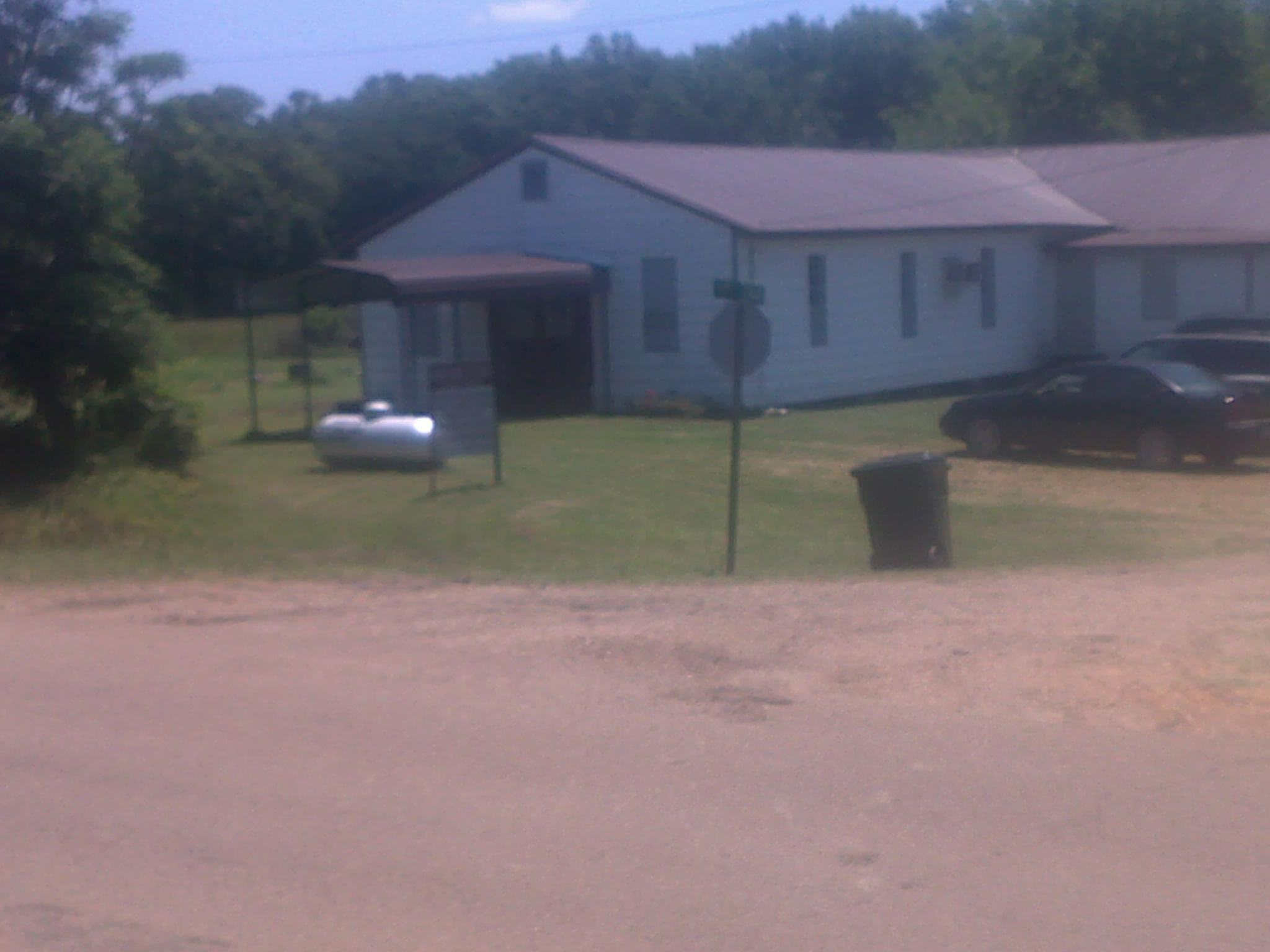
Swiftown United Baptist Church

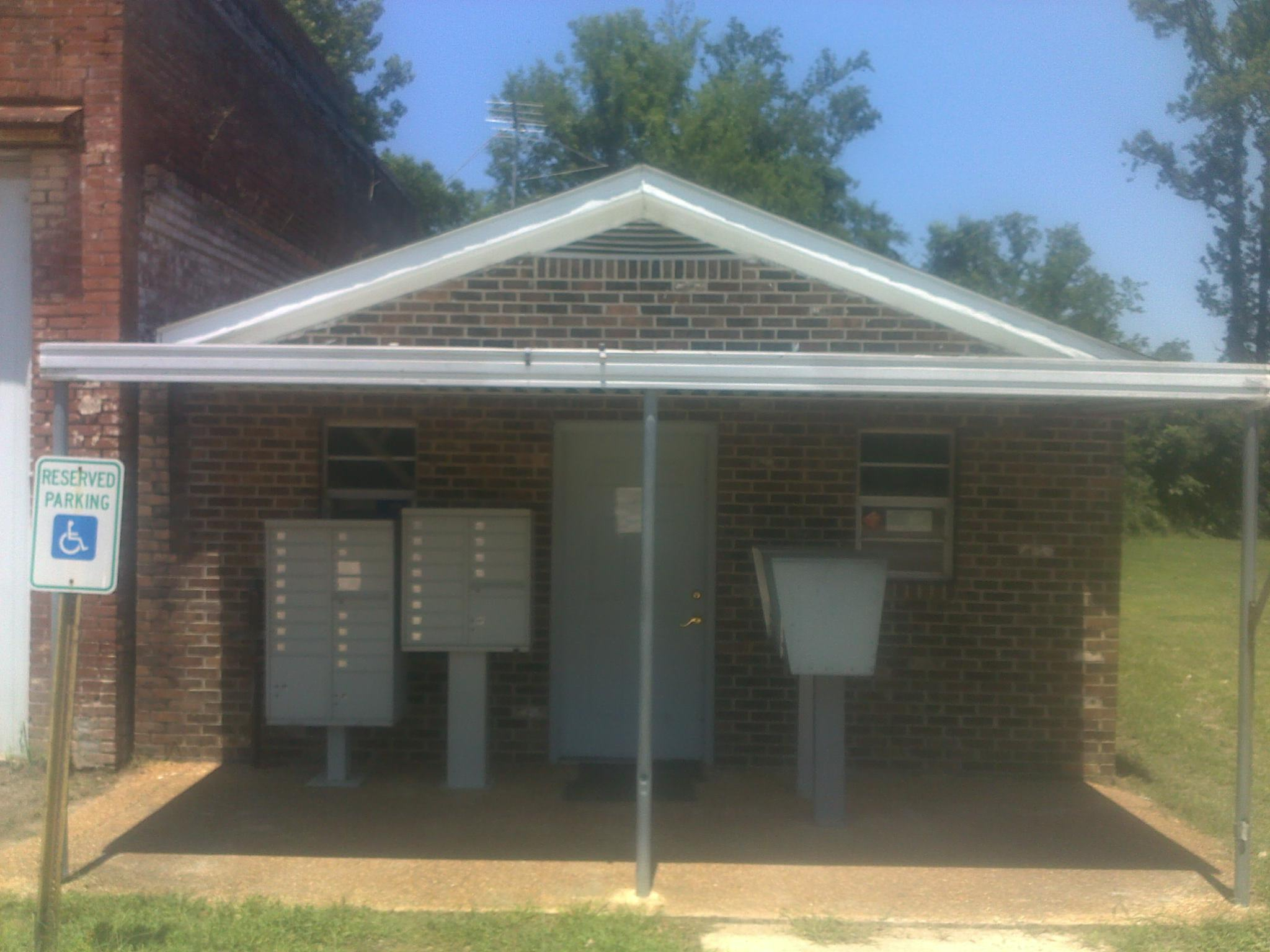
Post Office that once operated in the community (closed in 2011)
