= Berclair, Mississippi =

- Unincorporated community
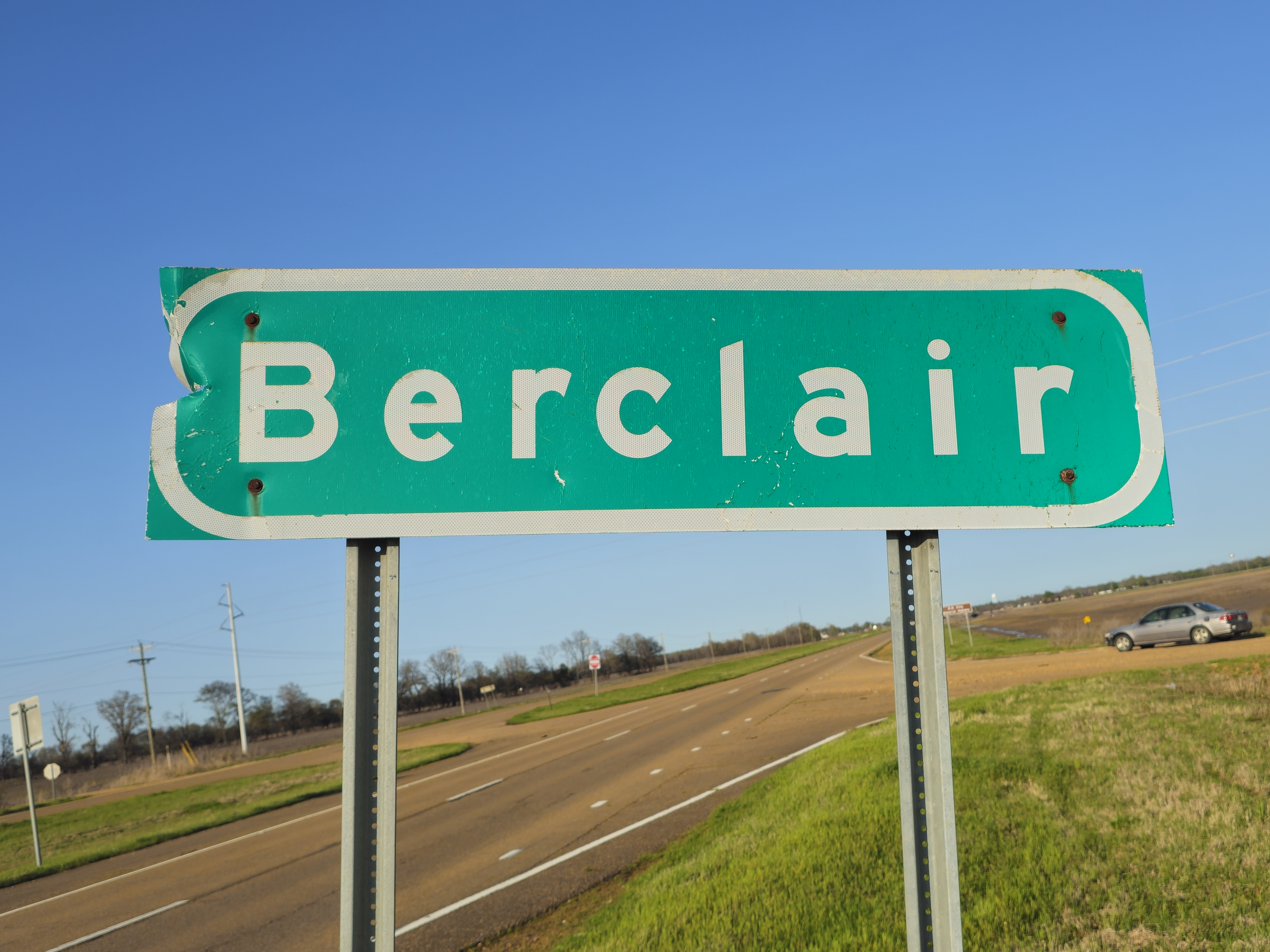

- Location within Mississippi Location within the United States
- Coordinates: 33°28′18″N 90°21′54″W
- Country: United States
- State: Mississippi
- County: Leflore
- Elevation: 125 ft (38 m)
- Time zone: UTC-6 (Central (CST))
  - Summer (DST): UTC-5 (CDT)
- ZIP code: 38941
- Area code: 662
- GNIS feature ID: 666839

Berclair is an unincorporated community located in Leflore County, Mississippi, United States. Berclair is approximately 3 miles (4.8 km) west of Itta Bena. It is part of the Greenwood, Mississippi micropolitan area.

== History ==
Berclair is located along Blue Lake. In 1905, Berclair was home to the Schuh-Miller Lumber Company. In 1910, Berclair had five general stores, sawmill, and cotton gin. Berclair sits on the Columbus and Greenville Railway.

A post office operated under the name Berclair from 1890 to 1894 and from 1899 to 1920.

== Notable person ==
Blues guitar player B.B. King was born just outside Berclair in 1925, and lived there until the age of four when he went to live with his maternal grandmother. This event is commemorated by a Mississippi Blues Trail marker in Berclair.

== Gallery ==
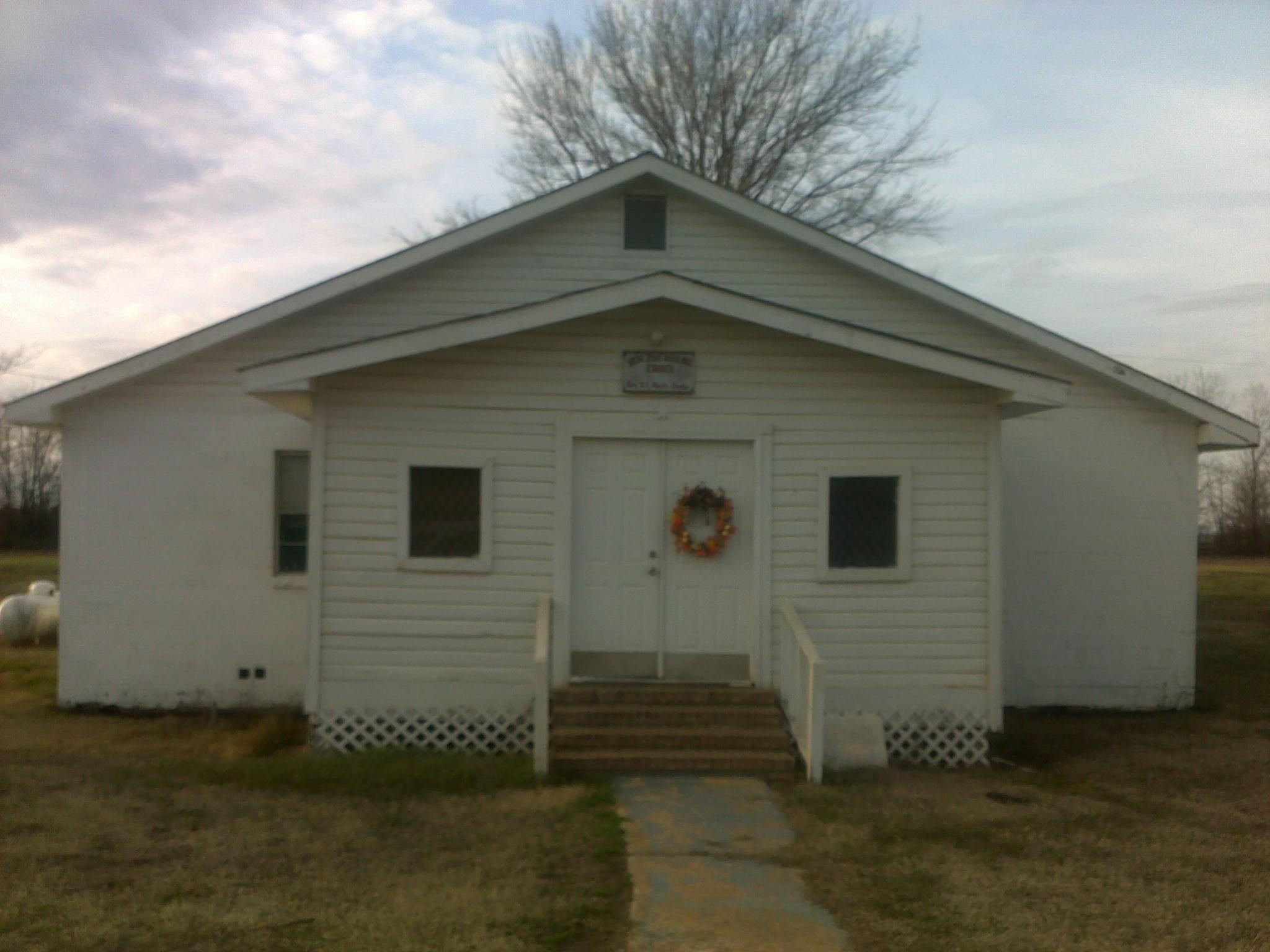
New Zion Church in the Berclair community

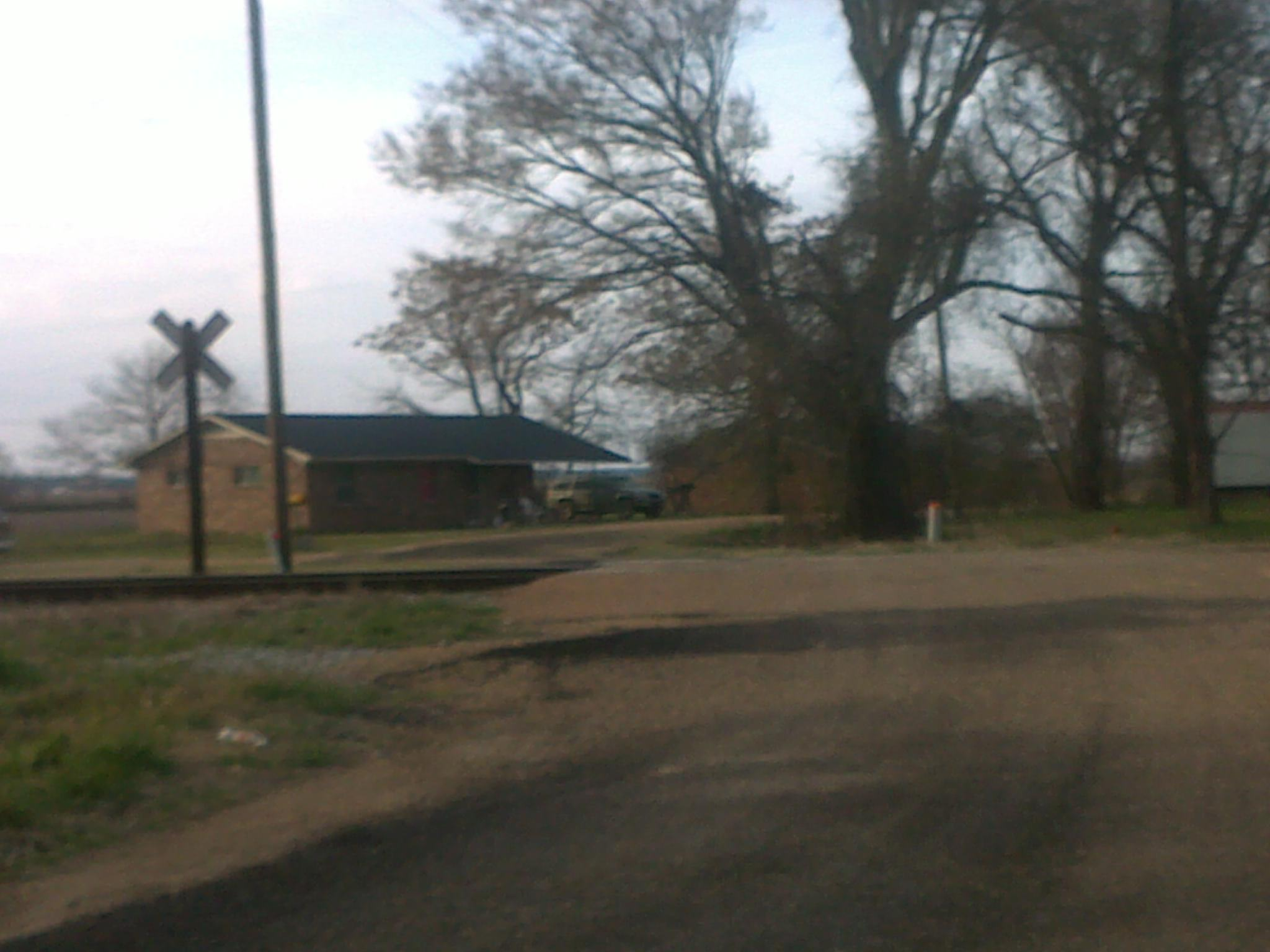
Homes in Berclair along Leflore County Road 167

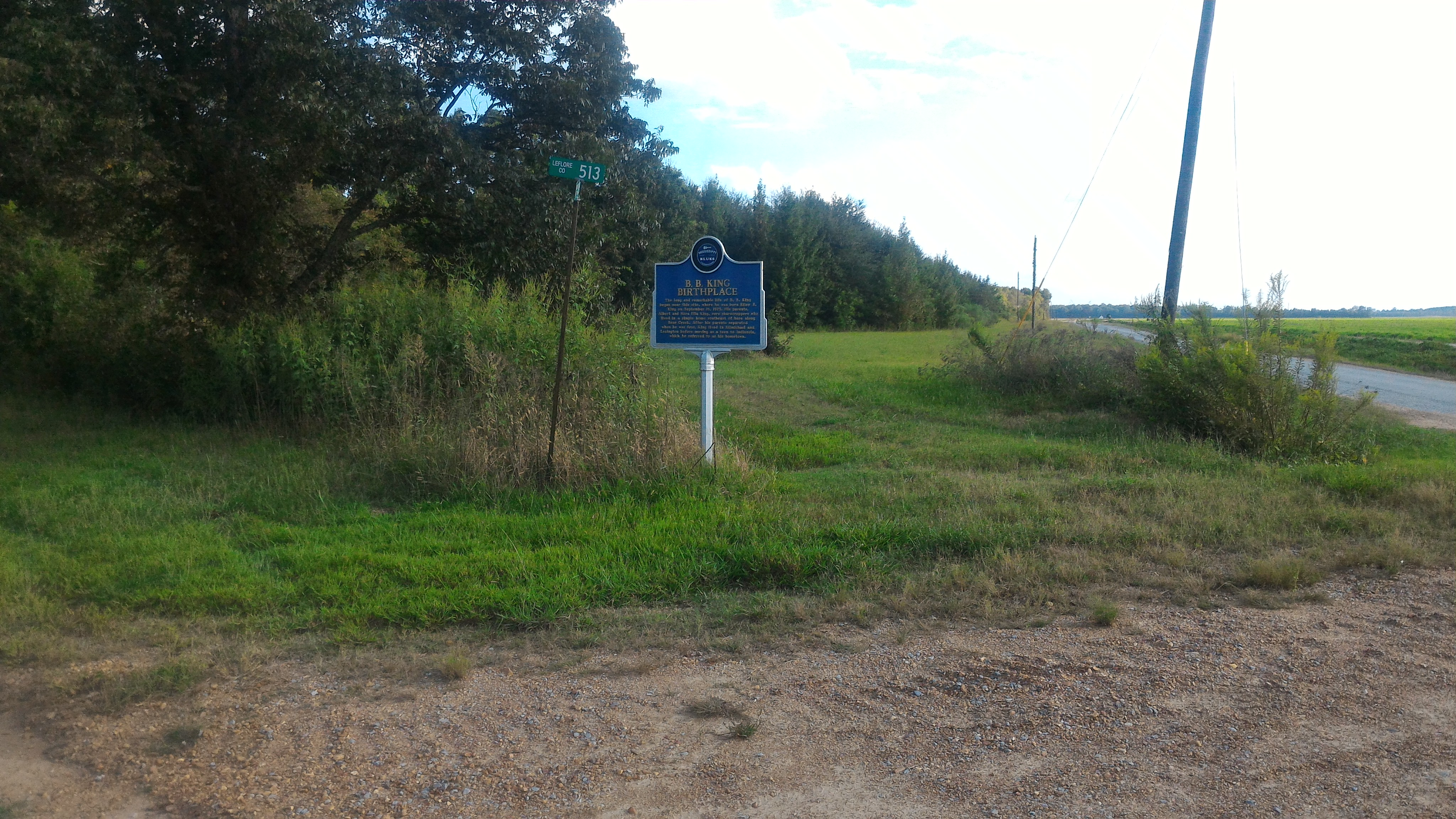
Mississippi Blues Trail marker located south of the Berclair community
