= Otoucalofa Creek =

Stream in Mississippi, U.S.

Coordinates: 34.1767764°N 89.7123092°W

Otoucalofa Creek is a stream in the U.S. state of Mississippi.

Otoucalofa is a name derived from the Choctaw language purported to mean either (sources vary) "chestnut stump" or "many prairies". Variant names are "O'Tickalofa Creek", "O'Tuckoloja Creek", "Octukalofa Creek", "Old Tuckolofa Creek", "Otoclaffah Creek", "Otoucalofa Creek Canal", "Otoukalofa Creek", and "Otuckolopha Creek".
