= Speller (surname) =

Speller is a surname. Notable people with the surname include:

- Frank Speller, American organist and academic
- Fred Speller (1863–1909), English footballer
- Émile Speller (1875–1952), Luxembourgish military officer
- Frank Newman Speller (1875–1968), Canadian-born American metallurgical engineer
- Henry Speller (1900–1997), American artist and blues musician
- Tony Speller (1929–2013), British politician
- Georgia Speller (1931–1987), African American artist
- Bob Speller (1956–2021), Canadian politician
- Sylvia Speller (born 1967), German physicist
- Cara Speller (born 1972), British film maker and producer
- Edward Speller (born 2002), British YouTuber
- Cody Speller (born 1994), Canadian professional football player
