= Lonnie Holley =

American experimental artist

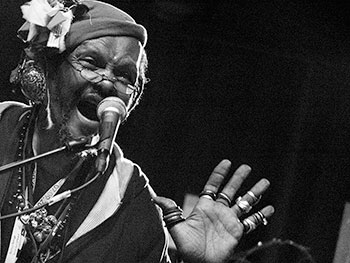
- Holley in 2014
- Born: February 10, 1950 (age 76); Birmingham, Alabama, US
- Known for: Folk art, experimental music
- Notable work: Do We Think Too Much? I Don't Think We Can Ever Stop
- Style: Found objects

Lonnie Bradley Holley (born February 10, 1950), sometimes known as the Sand Man, is an American artist, art educator and musician. He is best known for his assemblages and immersive environments made of found materials. In 1981, he brought a few of his sandstone carvings to then-Birmingham Museum of Art director Richard Murray, who helped to promote his work. In addition to solo exhibitions at the Birmingham Museum of Art and the Halsey Institute of Contemporary Art at the College of Charleston, Holley has exhibited in group exhibitions with other Black artists from the American South at the Michael C. Carlos Museum and the High Museum of Art in Atlanta, the Studio Museum in Harlem, the Metropolitan Museum of Art, the Philadelphia Museum of Art, the Toledo Museum of Art, Pérez Art Museum Miami, NSU Museum of Art Fort Lauderdale, the Institute of Contemporary Art, Boston, de Young Museum in San Francisco, National Gallery of Art, Washington, D.C., the Ikon Gallery in Birmingham, England, and the Royal Academy of Arts in London, among other places.

Holley's work is included in the representation of the Souls Grown Deep Foundation.

His albums are Just Before Music (2012), Keeping a Record of It (2013), MITH (2018), National Freedom (2020), Broken Mirror: A Selfie Reflection, a collaboration with Matthew E. White (2021), Oh Me Oh My (2023), and Tonky (2025).

== Early life ==
Lonnie Holley was born on February 10, 1950, in Birmingham, Alabama during the Jim Crow era. From the age of five, Holley worked various jobs: picking up trash at a drive-in movie theatre, washing dishes, and cooking. He lived in a whiskey house on the state fairgrounds and several foster homes. His early life was chaotic, and Holley was never afforded the pleasure of a real childhood. Born the seventh of 27 children, Holley claims to have been traded for a bottle of whiskey when he was four.

Before beginning his career, Holley spent time digging graves and picking cotton. He claims to have been pronounced brain-dead after being hit by a car. He became a father at 15 and now has 15 children. Holley also worked as a short-order cook at Disney World. He also did time at a notorious juvenile facility, the Alabama Industrial School for Negro Children in Mount Meigs.

== Visual art career ==
Holley began his artistic life in 1979 by carving tombstones for his sister's two children, who died in a house fire. He used blocks of a soft sandstone-like byproduct of metal casting, which he found discarded in piles by a foundry near his sister's house. Holley believes that divine intervention led him to the material and inspired his artwork. Inspired similarly, he made other carvings and assembled them in his yard along with various found objects. In 1981, Holley brought a few examples of his sandstone carvings to Birmingham Museum of Art director Richard Murray. The BMA displayed some of those pieces immediately, and Murray introduced him to the organizers of the 1981 exhibition "More Than Land and Sky: Art from Appalachia" at the Smithsonian American Art Museum in Washington, D.C. Soon Holley work was being acquired by other institutions, such as the American Folk Art Museum in New York and the High Museum of Art in Atlanta. His work has also been displayed at the White House.

Holley also became a guest at children's art events, bringing blocks of the foundry stone for children to carve.

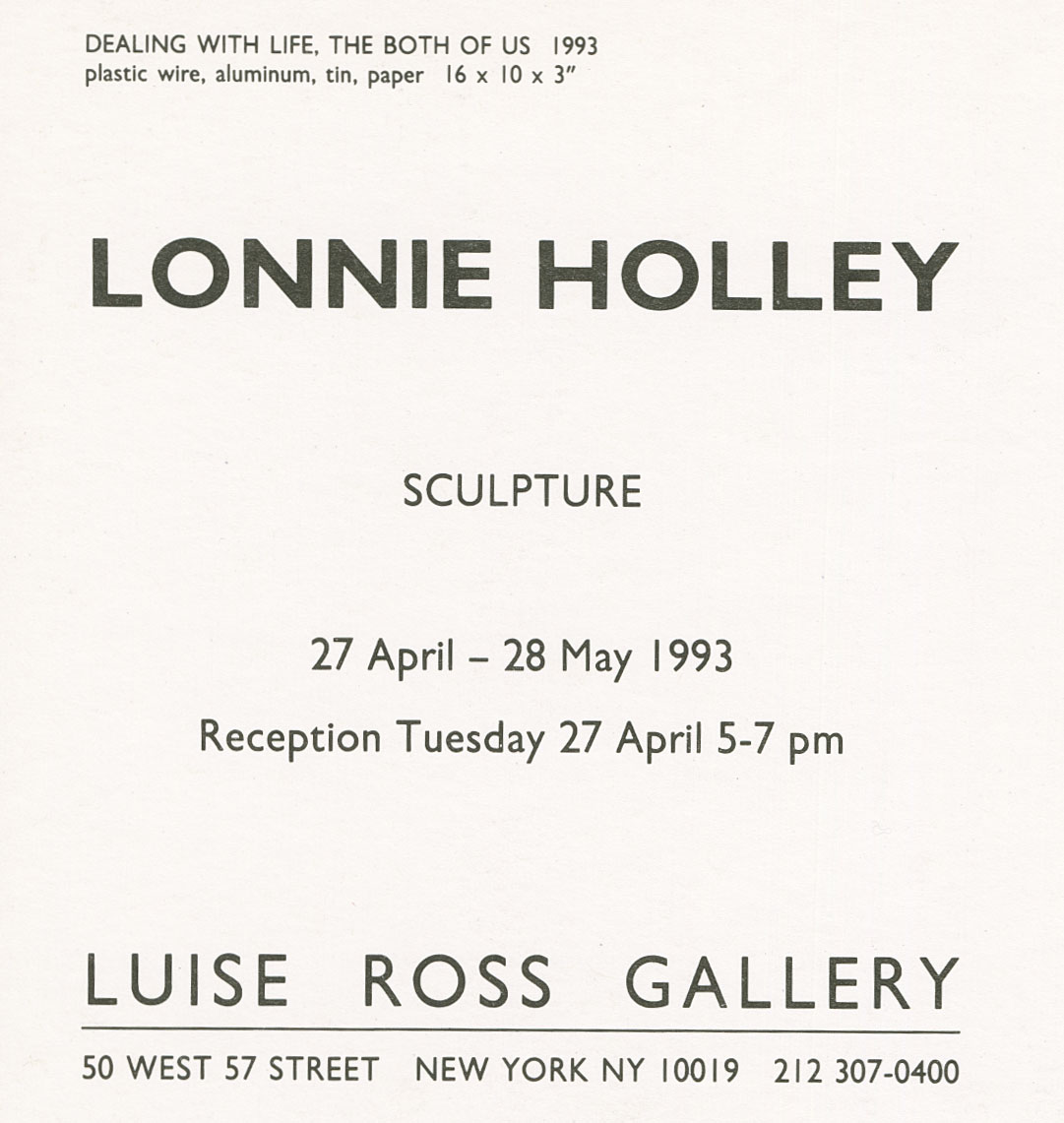
Exhibition announcement, Luise Ross Gallery, New York City, 1993

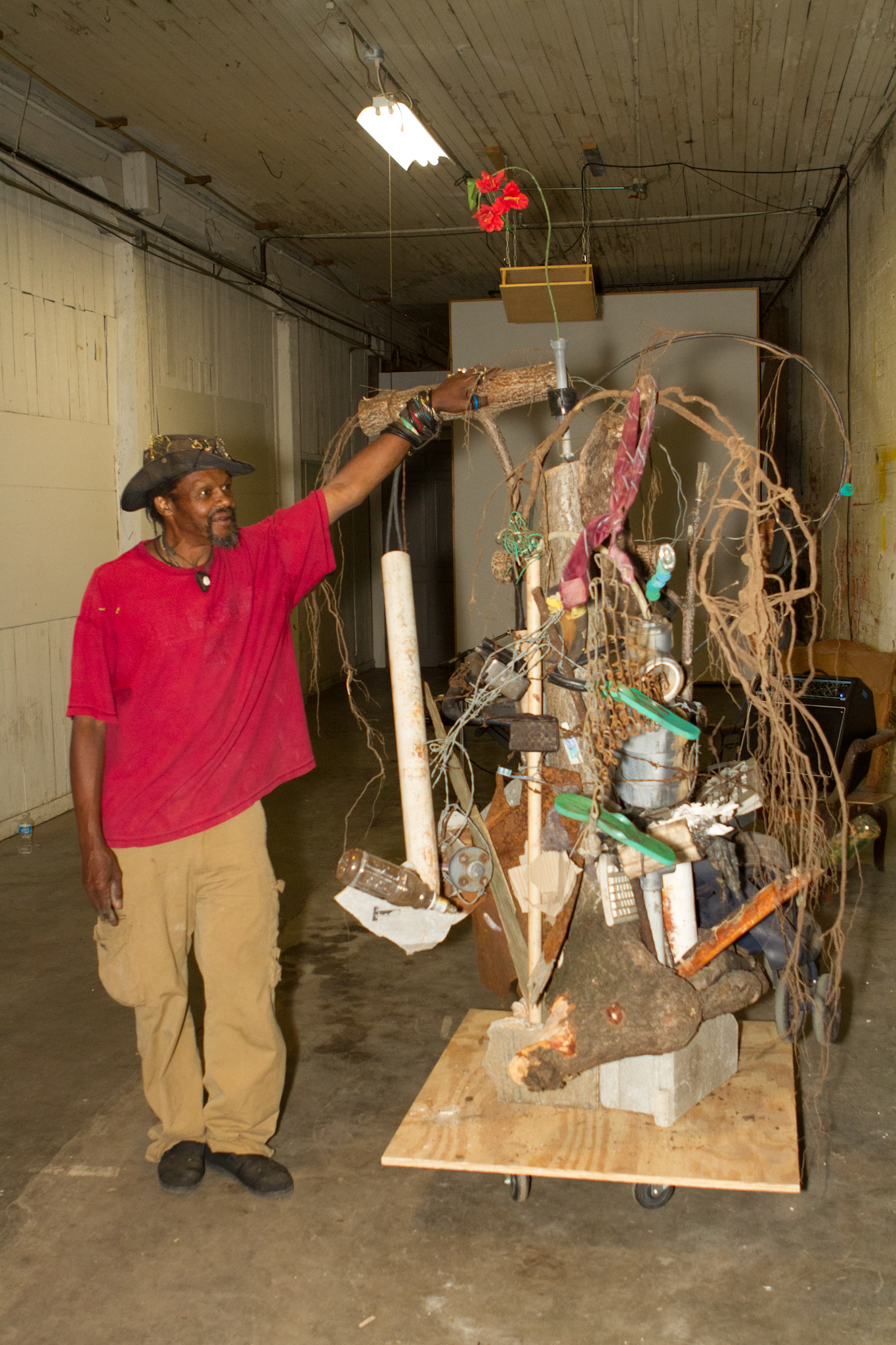
Lonnie Holley with his sculpture Drilling for Greedy, 2011

By the mid-1980s, Holley's work had diversified to include paintings and recycled found-object sculptures. His yard and adjacent abandoned lots near his home became an immersive art environment that was celebrated by visitors from the art world but threatened by scrap metal scavengers and, eventually, by the expansion of the Birmingham International Airport.

Holley was included in the 1996 group exhibition "Souls Grown Deep: African-American Vernacular Art of the South," an exhibition of over 450 artworks by 29 other contemporary artists, highlighting a significant artistic tradition that has risen in concert with the Civil Rights Movement. Held at Michael C. Carlos Museum at City Hall East in Atlanta, it was organized by the museum, the Atlanta Committee for the Olympic Games (ACOG) Cultural Olympiad, and the City of Atlanta Bureau of Cultural Affairs. Newsweek critic Malcolm Jones Jr., in his review of the show singled out Holley's work writing,

“Enter through a front yard re-created right down to the dirt floor, but a yard transformed, with broken tombstones, sprinkler heads, bedsprings, paintings, baby-doll parts—and all of it rejiggered by artist Lonnie Holley into a phantasmagorical vision as surreptitiously coherent as a dream. The rest of the show is not quite so overwhelming, but every piece is a wonder."

In late 1996 Holley was notified that his hilltop property near the airport would be condemned. He rejected the airport authority's offer to buy the property at the market rate of $14,000; knowing that his site-specific installation had personal and artistic value, he demanded $250,000. The dispute went to probate court, and in 1997 a settlement was reached and the airport authority paid $165,700 to move Holley's family and work to a larger property in Harpersville, Alabama.

Holley's first major retrospective, Do We Think Too Much? I Don't Think We Can Ever Stop: Lonnie Holley, A Twenty-Five Year Survey, was organized by the Birmingham Museum of Art and traveled in 2003 to the Ikon Gallery in Birmingham, England. From May 2003 to May 2004, Holley created a "sprawling, sculptural environment" in the lower sculpture garden at the Birmingham Museum of Art as part of their "Perspectives" series of site-specific installations. The creation of the work was documented in the film The Sandman's Garden by Arthur Crenshaw and in photographs by Alice Faye "Sister" Love.

Holley's work was included in the traveling exhibition "Mary Lee Bendolph, Gee's Bend Quilts, and Beyond" which started at Museum of International Folk Art in Santa Fe in November 2007, and hit the Knoxville Museum of Art in 2008, the Loveland Museum & Gallery in Loveland, Colorado, the Missouri Historical Society in St. Louis in 2009, the Berman Museum of World History, in Anniston, Alabama, and concluded at the Flint Institute of Arts, in Flint, Michigan in April 2010.

His work was also included in the 2014 exhibition at the Studio Museum in Harlem, "When the Stars Begin to Fall: Imagination and the American South" which also featured the work of Kevin Beasley, Beverly Buchanan, Henry Ray Clark, Thornton Dial, Minnie Evans, Theaster Gates, Trenton Doyle Hancock, Bessie Harvey, David Hammons, Ralph Lemon, Kerry James Marshall, Rodney McMillian, John Outterbridge, Noah Purifoy, Marie “Big Mama” Roseman, Jacolby and Patricia Satterwhite, Xaviera Simmons, Georgia Speller, Henry Speller, Stacy Lynn Waddell, Kara Walker, Carrie Mae Weems, Geo Wyeth, and others. The exhibition travelled to the NSU Museum of Art Fort Lauderdale the same year, then the Institute of Contemporary Art, Boston in 2015.

Holley installed sculptural work for the exhibition Groundstory: Tales From the Shade of the South, at Agnes Scott College of Decatur, Georgia, which ran at the Dalton Gallery (also in Decatur) from September 28 to November 17, 2012. In 2022, Holley was named a Fellow and received an unrestricted cash award from United States Artists (USA), a Chicago-based arts funding organization.

In 2015, the Halsey Institute of Contemporary Art at the College of Charleston presented Holley's first solo museum exhibition since 1994, featuring a residency, video, concert, and monographic catalog entitled "Something to Take My Place: The Art of Lonnie Holley." The exhibition showcased some of Holley's assemblage works since the early 1990s. For the residency, he created works on-site and visited with school groups and College of Charleston classes.

Two years later, Holley's work was featured with 61 others in "Revelations: Art from the African American South" at the de Young Museum to mark the debut of the Fine Arts Museums of San Francisco major acquisition from the Souls Grown Deep Foundation in Atlanta of 62 works. Other artists represented include Dial, sculptors Ralph Griffin, Bessie Harvey, and Joe Minter, painters Joe Light and Mary T. Smith, and artists Ronald Lockett, Mose Tolliver, and Purvis Young, and Gee's Bend quilt associates Jessie T. Pettway and Annie Mae Young. A writer for KQED described the show as a "breathtaking display of genius, grit and wit."

In 2018, his work was part of the exhibition "History Refused to Die" at the Metropolitan Museum of Art with 30 paintings, sculptures, drawings, and quilts by self-taught contemporary Black artists from the American South. It marked the Souls Grown Deep Foundation's 2014 gift of works to the museum. The Wall Street Journal reviewer called it "a sharply focused, elegantly installed selection" and the reviewer from The Art Newspaper described the show as "a salve to see an exhibition as succinct, as purposeful, intelligently designed and filled with good art."

Other group exhibitions marking respective institutional acquisitions from the Atlanta-based foundation include "Souls Grown Deep: Artists of the African American South" at the Philadelphia Museum of Art in 2019, "What Carried Us Over: Gifts from the Gordon W. Bailey Collection" at the Pérez Art Museum Miami, "Living Legacies: Art of the African American South" at the Toledo Museum of Art in 2022, and "Called to Create: Black Artists of the American South" at the National Gallery of Art in Washington, D.C.

== Other exhibitions ==
- "Outliers and American Vanguard Art," National Gallery of Art, Washington, D.C., January 28, 2018 – May 13, 2018; High Museum of Art, Atlanta, June 24 – September 30, 2018; Los Angeles County Museum of Art, November 18, 2018 – March 18, 2019
- "We Will Walk – Art and Resistance in the American South" at Turner Contemporary, Kent, England, February 7, 2020 – September 6, 2020
- "Souls Grown Deep like the Rivers: Black Artists from the American South," Royal Academy of Arts, London, March 17, 2023 - June 18, 2023

== Music career ==
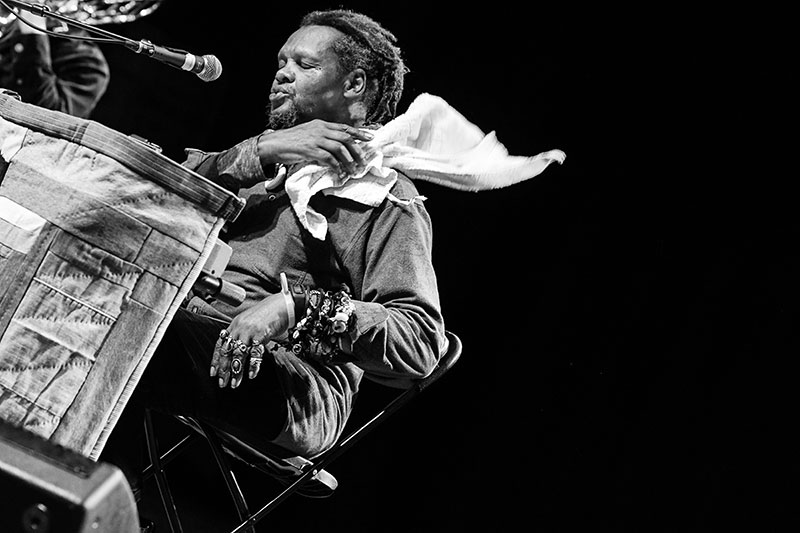
Holley performing in Aarhus, Denmark, 2018

Holley's professional music career began in 2006 when he made improvisational vocal recordings, at the urging of Matt Arnett (son of William Arnett), in an Alabama church using just a keyboard and a microphone. In 2012, he released his debut album Just Before Music on the Dust-to-Digital label, followed by Keeping a Record of It the following year. In September 2018, he released his third album MITH on Jagjaguwar. Pitchfork gave it' a 7.9 out of 10 rating.

Pitchfork gave Holley's 2020 album National Freedom an 8.0 out of 10 rating.

In April 2021, Holley released a collaboration album with Matthew E. White titled Broken Mirror: A Selfie Reflection. Also in 2022, he has begun to record his fourth album, Oh Me Oh My, which was released on March 10, 2023, to critical acclaim: Pitchfork gave it an 8.5 out of 10 rating, and Paste included it on its list of the Top 10 albums of 2023, and the Washington Post interviewed Holley for it.

== Discography ==
- Just Before Music (2012)
- Keeping a Record of It (2013)
- Live on the Modern World with DJ Trouble – April 2013
- MITH (2018)
- National Freedom (2020)
- Broken Mirror: A Selfie Reflection (2021) – with Matthew E. White
- Oh Me Oh My (2023)
- Tonky (2025)

== Sources ==
- Dietz, Andrew (April 1, 2006) The Last Folk Hero: A True Story of Race and Art, Power and Profit. Atlanta: Ellis Lane Press. ISBN 0-9771968-0-1
- Reeves, Jay (February 8, 1997) "Acclaimed folk artist losing fight against FAA and urban sprawl." Associated Press.
