= Mississippi Highway 434 =

Highway in Mississippi

Mississippi Highway 434
- MS 434 highlighted in pink

Route information
- Maintained by MDOT and Sharkey County
- Length: 4.056 mi (6.527 km)
- Existed: c. 1951–present

Major junctions
- West end: US 61 near Nitta Yuma
- East end: Delta City Road near Delta City

Location
- Country: United States
- State: Mississippi
- Counties: Sharkey

Highway system
- Mississippi State Highway System; Interstate; US; State
← MS 433	→ MS 436

Mississippi Highway 434 (MS 434) is a short state highway in western Mississippi. The route travels from U.S. Route 61 (US 61) near Nitta Yuma and travels eastward. After crossing a creek, the road travels northeastward and enters Delta City, and the route ends inside the unincorporated community. The route was constructed around 1951, connecting from US 61 to Delta City. An extension along a county road to US 49W existed from 1957 to 1967.

== Route description ==
All of MS 434 is located in Sharkey County. In 2017, the Mississippi Department of Transportation (MDOT) calculated 220 vehicles traveling on MS 434 southwest of Durst Road on average each day. The route is legally defined in Mississippi Code § 65-3-3, and it is maintained by MDOT and Sharkey County, as part of the Mississippi State Highway System.

MS 434 starts at a three-way junction with US 61 near Nitta Yuma and travels eastward. The road travels across farmland, dips southwards near Ivy Road, and crosses Deer Creek. The route turns northeastwards and intersects School Road. Near Durst Road, MS 434 crosses a drainage ditch. At Cooper Road and Walnut Drive, the route turns east and state maintenance ends. In Delta City, MS 434 ends past Keth Road and Richey Road as pavement markings change. The road continues as Delta City Road, ending at River Road near the Sunflower River.

== History ==
Around 1951, a paved road was constructed from US 61 to Catchings, which is also known as Delta City. The road was signed as MS 434 by 1958. About two years later, MS 434 was extended eastward along a county-maintained gravel road to US 49W south of Silver City in Humphreys County, which was decommissioned by 1967.

== Major intersections ==
The entire route is in Sharkey County.

Location	mi	km	Destinations	Notes
	0.0	0.0	US 61 – Hollandale, Anguilla	Western terminus
Delta City	3.9	6.3	Begin local maintenance	
Delta City	4.1	6.6	Delta City Road	Eastern terminus
1.000 mi = 1.609 km; 1.000 km = 0.621 mi
