= Delta City, Mississippi =

- Census-designated place
- Location within Mississippi Location within the United States
- Coordinates: 33°04′26″N 90°47′33″W
- Country: United States
- State: Mississippi
- County: Sharkey

Area
  - Total: 2.39 sq mi (6.18 km^{2})
  - Land: 2.39 sq mi (6.18 km^{2})
  - Water: 0 sq mi (0.00 km^{2})
- Elevation: 105 ft (32 m)

Population (2020)
  - Total: 70
  - Density: 29.3/sq mi (11.32/km^{2})
- Time zone: UTC-6 (Central (CST))
  - Summer (DST): UTC-5 (CDT)
- ZIP code: 39061
- Area code: 662
- GNIS feature ID: 2812741

Delta City is a census-designated place (CDP) and unincorporated community located on Mississippi Highway 434 in Sharkey County, Mississippi. Delta City is approximately 6 miles (9.7 km) east of Panther Burn and approximately 5 miles (8.0 km) north of Nitta Yuma. Although an unincorporated community, Delta City has a zip code of 39061.

Per the 2020 Census, the population was 70.

On the afternoon of Sunday, February 21, 1971, a large and long-tracked F5 tornado impacted Delta City, obliterating most of the town.

== Demographics ==
Historical population
Census	Pop.	Note	%±
2020	70		—
U.S. Decennial Census; 2020

Delta City was first listed as a census designated place in the 2020 U.S. census.

=== 2020 census ===
Delta City CDP, Mississippi – Racial and ethnic composition Note: the US Census treats Hispanic/Latino as an ethnic category. This table excludes Latinos from the racial categories and assigns them to a separate category. Hispanics/Latinos may be of any race.
Race / Ethnicity (NH = Non-Hispanic)	Pop 2020	% 2020
White alone (NH)	35	50.00%
Black or African American alone (NH)	32	45.71%
Native American or Alaska Native alone (NH)	0	0.00%
Asian alone (NH)	0	0.00%
Native Hawaiian or Pacific Islander alone (NH)	0	0.00%
Other race alone (NH)	0	0.00%
Mixed race or Multiracial (NH)	1	1.43%
Hispanic or Latino (any race)	2	2.86%
Total	70	100.00%

== Education ==
It is a part of the South Delta School District, which operates South Delta High School.
