= Tonky =

Studio album by Lonnie Holley
- Released: March 21, 2025
- Genre: Jazz, soul, electronic, blues, hip-hop
- Length: 52:09
- Label: Jagjaguwar
- Producer: Jacknife Lee

Lonnie Holley chronology
Oh Me Oh My (2023)	Tonky (2025)

Singles from Tonky
- 1. "Protest with Love" Released: March 21, 2025

Tonky is a studio album by American musician Lonnie Holley. It was released on March 21, 2025, by Jagjaguwar. Produced by Irish multi-instrumentalist Jacknife Lee, the album consists of fourteen songs and features collaborators such as Alabaster DePlume, Angel Bat Dawid and Jesca Hoop.

== Background ==
The second collaboration by Holley and Lee, the album focuses on the reflection of abuse and suffering faced by Holley in his early years. The title is reflective of his nickname from his childhood, derived from a honky-tonk owned by his caretakers. The album's lead single, "Protest with Love", incorporating elements of electronic pop and rock, was released on March 21, 2025.

== Reception ==
Professional ratings
Review scores
Source	Rating
AllMusic	3.5/5 stars
Paste	8.6/10
Pitchfork	7.5/10
The Line of Best Fit	9/10 stars
Uncut	4/5 stars

Paul Simpson of AllMusic summarized the album in his review of the album, stating "In general, Tonky covers much of the same lyrical and musical ground as Oh Me Oh My...reflects on his tumultuous life as well as other people's reactions to his art and music, while offering messages of peace and hope, urging the audience to never give up."

Describing it as "an album whose big heart matches its lush palette, which emphasizes rumbling rhythms, layered beats, and familiar instruments abraded to sound almost but not quite unrecognizable," Pitchfork assigned it a rating of 7.5 out of ten.

Paste gave the album a rating of 8.6 out of ten, describing it as "poetry set in motion through fluid, emotional and inventive music." Uncut Magazine remarked "Holley's personal story is gripping enough. But a big part of what makes Tonky compelling is how he stitches his tales into a wider fabric of African-American experience," rating the album four stars. The Line of Best Fit noted "This makes it all the more astounding that Holley leads new record Tonky with a straightforward directive of love; not boundless love, not unconditional love, but a pointed, militant caress of the hope our species can't shake," giving it a rating of nine out of ten. The New York Times described the album as "hypnotic, soulful, and genre-bending, which incorporates jazz, blues, hip-hop and electronic music."

== Track listing ==
All tracks are written by Lonnie Holley and Jacknife Lee, with additional writers noted.

Tonky track listing
No.	Title	Writer(s)	Length
1.	"Seeds"	Davide Rossi	9:03
2.	"Life" (featuring Mary Lattimore)	Mary Lattimore	1:21
3.	"Protest with Love"		2:36
4.	"The Burden" (featuring Angel Bat Dawid)	Angel Bat Dawid	3:11
5.	"The Same Stars" (featuring Joe Minter and Open Mike Eagle)	Michael W. Eagle II	4:49
6.	"We Was Kings in the Jungle, Slaves in the Field"		4:37
7.	"Strength of a Song" (featuring Alabaster DePlume)	Angus Fairbarn	2:59
8.	"What's Going On" (featuring Isaac Brock)	Isaac Brock	3:24
9.	"Fear the Machine"		0:47
10.	"I Looked Over My Shoulder" (featuring Billy Woods)	Rossi; William Woods	4:23
11.	"Did I Do Enough-" (featuring Jesca Hoop)	Jesca Hoop	5:42
12.	"That's Not Art, That's Not Music"	Budgie	3:41
13.	"Those Stars Are Still Shining" (featuring Saul Williams)	Saul Williams	1:00
14.	"A Change Is Gonna Come"		4:36
Total length:			52:09

== Personnel ==
- Lonnie Holley – vocals
- Jacknife Lee – computer programming, synthesizer, production, mixing, recording (all tracks); keyboards (tracks 1–8, 10–14), percussion (1–8, 10–12, 14), drums (1–4, 6–8, 10, 14), bass (1, 3, 4, 6, 8, 10), vocals (1, 3, 12), guitar (2, 12), recorder (3, 4, 6), vibraphone (5, 12), marimba (5)
- Davide Rossi – bass, cello, viola, violin (tracks 1, 5, 7, 10, 11)
- Jenn Wasner – vocals (track 1)
- Mary Lattimore – harp (track 2)
- Jordan Katz – horn (tracks 3, 6, 8, 12), trumpet (14)
- Kelly Pratt – horn (tracks 3, 6, 12), flute (3, 12)
- The Legendary Ingramettes – vocals (tracks 3, 6, 8, 12)
- Angel Bat Dawid – clarinet (track 4)
- Joe Minter – vocals (track 5)
- Open Mike Eagle – vocals (track 5)
- Mikel Patrick Avery – drums (track 6)
- Fidel Harris – vocals (track 6)
- Marchael Harris Jr. – vocals (track 6)
- Marley Turner – vocals (track 6)
- Tommy de Bourbon – guitar (track 7)
- Alabaster DePlume – saxophone (track 7)
- Budgie – drums (tracks 8, 12), marimba (12)
- Matt Bishop – drums (track 8)
- Isaac Brock – vocals (track 8)
- Billy Woods – vocals (track 10)
- Marlon Patton – drums (tracks 11, 14)
- Jesca Hoop – vocals (track 11)
- Saul Williams – vocals (track 13)
- Steve Dress – bass (track 14)
- Miles Johnson – art direction
