= Buddie Newman =

American politician (1921–2002)

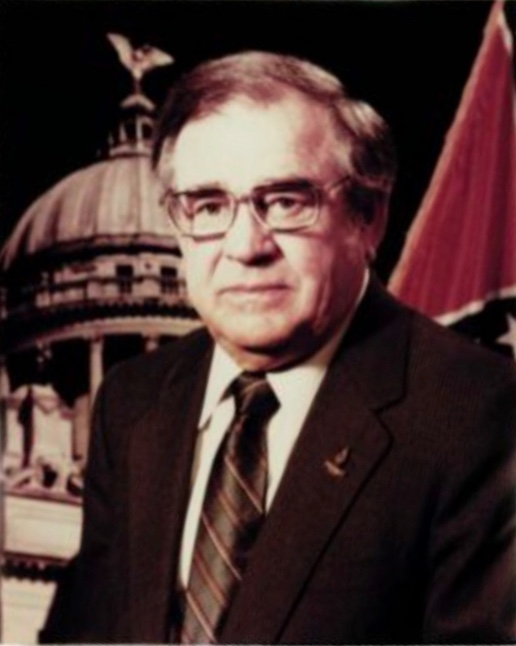
- Official portrait, 1984

58th Speaker of the Mississippi House of Representatives
- In office January 1976 – January 5, 1988
- Preceded by: John Junkin
- Succeeded by: Tim Ford

Member of the Mississippi House of Representatives
- In office January 1952 – January 5, 1988
- Preceded by: Wade Cole
- Succeeded by: Charles Weissinger Jr.

Member of the Mississippi State Senate from the 20th district
- In office 1948–1952
- Preceded by: Bernard Graft
- Succeeded by: Herman C. Glazier Jr.

Personal details
- Born: Clarence Benton Newman; May 8, 1921 Valley Park, Mississippi, U.S.
- Died: October 13, 2002 (aged 81) Valley Park, Mississippi, U.S.
- Party: Democratic
- Spouse: Betty Petrus
- Parent: J. C. Newman (father)

Military service
- Branch/service: United States Army
- Rank: Technician fifth grade
- Battles/wars: World War II

Clarence Benton "Buddie" Newman (May 8, 1921 – October 13, 2002) was an American politician who served as Speaker of the Mississippi House of Representatives from 1976 to 1988. He was elected to one term in the state senate before beginning his 36-year career in the House, representing his native Issaquena County.

A conservative Democrat, Newman was a close ally of House Speaker Walter Sillers Jr. and Governor Ross Barnett, supporting racial segregation throughout the Civil Rights era and afterward.

== Early life and education ==
Newman was born on May 8, 1921, at the Railroad Section Foreman's House in Valley Park, Mississippi, the fifth child of Minnie Belle (Prine) and Josephus Clarence Newman Sr., a farmer and foreman for the Yazoo and Mississippi Valley Railroad. He was named after his father and Dr. J. B. Benton, the railroad physician who delivered him.

In 1931, J. C. was elected to the Mississippi House of Representatives when incumbent R. E. Foster died in office, and he brought the young Buddie with him to Jackson as a legislative page in 1938.

== Political career ==
A member of his local Citizens' Council, Newman was a proponent of racial segregation and white supremacy. He served as an advisor to Governor Barnett during the Ole Miss riot of 1962 and was reportedly one of the strongest voices urging defiance of federal authorities on the integration of state institutions. Speaker Sillers appointed him as chair of the powerful House ways and means committee in 1964.

== Later life and death ==
Newman died at his home on October 13, 2002. After lying in state in the state capitol rotunda, he was buried in Cedar Hill Cemetery in Vicksburg.

Mississippi House of Representatives
Preceded by John Junkin	Speaker of the Mississippi House of Representatives; 1976–1988	Succeeded by Tim Ford
