= Speller =

Speller may refer to:

- A book used for proper spelling
- A participant in a spelling bee
- Speller (surname)
