= Patmos (disambiguation) =

Patmos is a Greek island.

Patmos may also refer to:

- Patmos, Arkansas, a town in the United States
- Patmos, Georgia, an unincorporated community in the United States
- Patmos, Mississippi, an unincorporated community in the United States
- Patmos, Ohio, an unincorporated community in the United States
- Patmos Peak, a mountain in Antarctica
- The poem Patmos by the German poet Friedrich Hölderlin

== See also ==
- John of Patmos
- Patnos, a town in Turkey and former Armenian city
