= Issaquena =

Issaquena may refer to:

- Issaquena County, Mississippi
- Issaquena, Mississippi, an unincorporated community in Sharkey County
- Issaquena, a 2002 film by Lance Hammer
