= South Delta High School =

Coordinates: 32.900943°N 90.879068°W

- 106 Athletic Drive, Rolling Fork, MS 39159; United States

Information
- School district: South Delta School District
- NCES School ID: 280396000753
- Principal: Edwin Smith
- Grades: 9–12
- Gender: Coeducational
- Enrollment: 170 (2023-2024)
- Campus type: Rural
- Colors: Red and gold
- Mascot: Bulldogs
- Website: www.southdelta.k12.ms.us/schools/high-school

South Delta High School is a public high school in Rolling Fork, Mississippi (United States). The school serves students in grades nine through twelve.

South Delta High is part of the South Delta School District; the district serves all of Sharkey County, including the towns of Rolling Fork, Anguilla, and Cary, as well as the unincorporated areas of Delta City, Nitta Yuma, and Panther Burn. It also serves most of Issaquena County, including the town of Mayersville, the unincorporated area of Valley Park, and most of the unincorporated area of Grace.

The school's mascot is the Bulldog. The school's colors are red, gold, and black.

== Demographics ==
There were a total of 374 students enrolled in South Delta High during the 2006–2007 school year. The gender makeup of the district was 53% female and 47% male. The racial makeup of the school was 97.06% African American, 2.41% White, and 0.53% Hispanic.

== Notable alumni ==
- Tavares Washington, American football player

== See also ==
- List of high schools in Mississippi
- List of school districts in Mississippi
