= Grace, Mississippi =

- Census-designated place
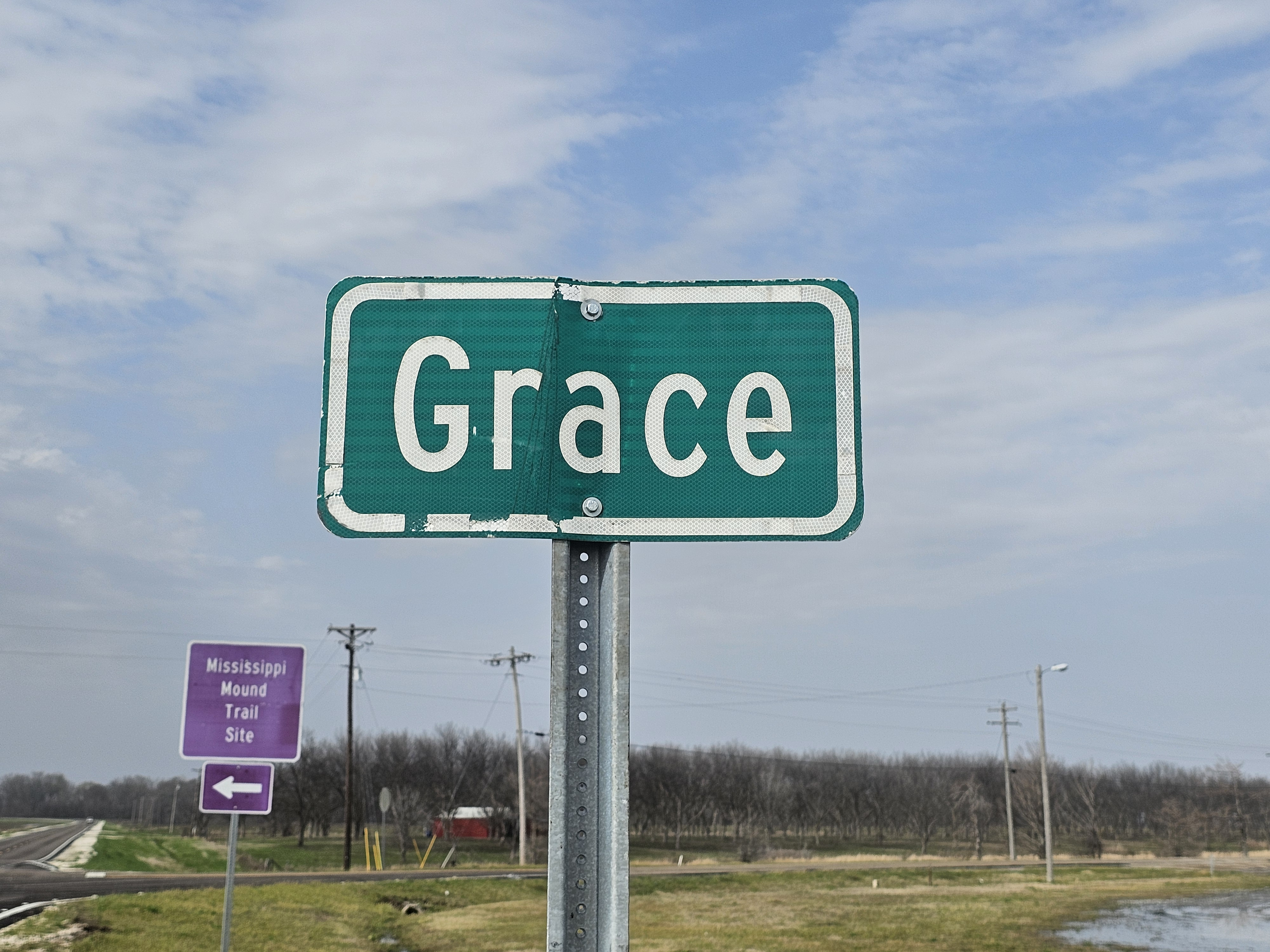
- Highway Sign reading "Grace"

- Location within Mississippi Location within the United States
- Coordinates: 32°59′48″N 90°57′29″W
- Country: United States
- State: Mississippi
- County: Issaquena

Area
  - Total: 4.81 sq mi (12.45 km^{2})
  - Land: 4.81 sq mi (12.45 km^{2})
  - Water: 0 sq mi (0.00 km^{2})
- Elevation: 105 ft (32 m)

Population (2020)
  - Total: 77
  - Density: 16.0/sq mi (6.19/km^{2})
- Time zone: UTC-6 (Central (CST))
  - Summer (DST): UTC-5 (CDT)
- ZIP codes: 38745
- FIPS code: 28-28500
- GNIS feature ID: 2812726

Grace is a census-designated place (CDP) and unincorporated community in Issaquena County, Mississippi, United States. It is located several miles northeast of Mayersville.

Grace has a post office with the ZIP code 38745.

Per the 2020 Census, the population was 77.

== History ==
Grace is located on the former Yazoo and Mississippi Valley Railroad. In 1910, Grace was home to five general stores, a grocery store, a blacksmith, and a drug store.

Grace Mounds, which are listed on the Mississippi Mound Trail, are located near Grace.

== Demographics ==
Historical population
Census	Pop.	Note	%±
2020	77		—
U.S. Decennial Census; 2020

Grace was first listed as a census designated place in the 2020 U.S. census.

=== 2020 census ===
Grace CDP, Mississippi – Racial and ethnic composition Note: the US Census treats Hispanic/Latino as an ethnic category. This table excludes Latinos from the racial categories and assigns them to a separate category. Hispanics/Latinos may be of any race.
Race / Ethnicity (NH = Non-Hispanic)	Pop 2020	% 2020
White alone (NH)	18	23.38%
Black or African American alone (NH)	56	72.73%
Native American or Alaska Native alone (NH)	0	0.00%
Asian alone (NH)	1	1.30%
Native Hawaiian or Pacific Islander alone (NH)	0	0.00%
Other race alone (NH)	0	0.00%
Mixed race or Multiracial (NH)	1	1.30%
Hispanic or Latino (any race)	1	1.30%
Total	77	100.00%

== Climate ==
The climate in this area is characterized by relatively high temperatures and evenly distributed precipitation throughout the year. According to the Köppen Climate Classification system, Grace has a Humid subtropical climate, abbreviated "Cfa" on climate maps.

== Education ==
Most of Grace is in the South Delta School District (which operates South Delta High School) while some is in the Western Line School District.
