= Valley Park, Mississippi =

- Census-designated place
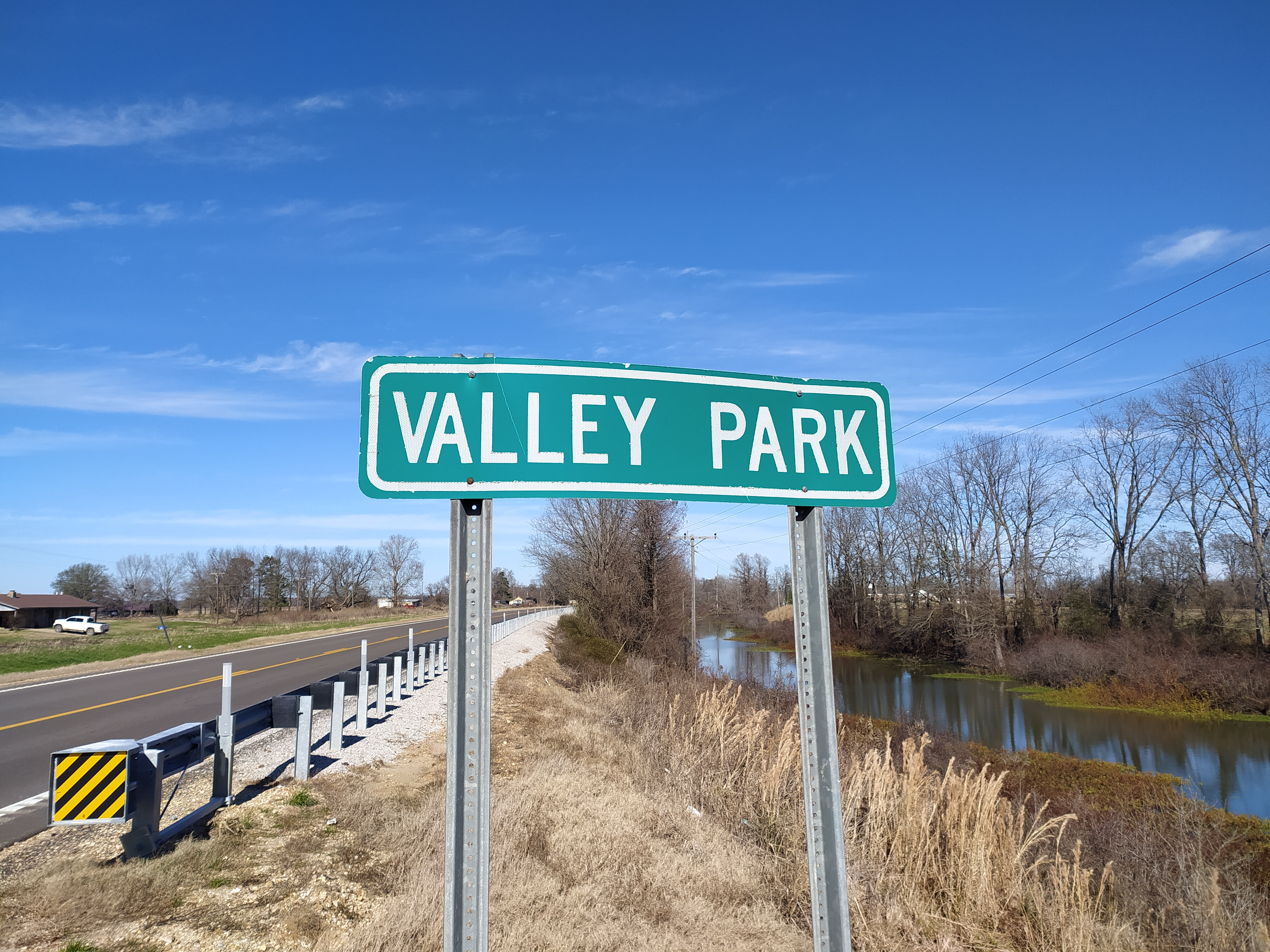
- Highway sign at Valley Park

- Location within Mississippi Location within the United States
- Coordinates: 32°38′N 90°52′W
- Country: United States
- State: Mississippi
- County: Issaquena

Area
  - Total: 4.68 sq mi (12.12 km^{2})
  - Land: 4.54 sq mi (11.75 km^{2})
  - Water: 0.14 sq mi (0.37 km^{2})
- Elevation: 98 ft (30 m)

Population (2020)
  - Total: 71
  - Density: 15.6/sq mi (6.04/km^{2})
- Time zone: UTC-6 (Central (CST))
  - Summer (DST): UTC-5 (CDT)
- ZIP code: 39177
- FIPS code: 28-76040
- GNIS feature ID: 2812725

Valley Park is a census-designated place (CDP) and unincorporated community in Issaquena County, Mississippi, United States. Its elevation is 95 feet (29 m). Although unincorporated, it has a post office, with the ZIP code of 39177.

The Aden Archaeological Site is located 1.5 mi (2.4 km) east of Valley Park.

per the 2020 Census, the population was 71.

== History ==
Valley Park is located on the Canadian National Railway and was originally known as Halpin. A post office operated under the name Halpin from 1884 to 1890 and first began operating under the name Valley Park in 1890.

== Demographics ==
Historical population
Census	Pop.	Note	%±
2020	71		—
U.S. Decennial Census; 2020

Valley Park was first listed as a census designated place in the 2020 U.S. census.

=== 2020 census ===
Valley Park CDP, Mississippi – Racial and ethnic composition Note: the US Census treats Hispanic/Latino as an ethnic category. This table excludes Latinos from the racial categories and assigns them to a separate category. Hispanics/Latinos may be of any race.
Race / Ethnicity (NH = Non-Hispanic)	Pop 2020	% 2020
White alone (NH)	56	78.87%
Black or African American alone (NH)	13	18.31%
Native American or Alaska Native alone (NH)	0	0.00%
Asian alone (NH)	0	0.00%
Pacific Islander alone (NH)	0	0.00%
Some Other Race alone (NH)	0	0.00%
Mixed Race or Multi-Racial (NH)	0	0.00%
Hispanic or Latino (any race)	2	2.82%
Total	71	100.00%

== Film set ==
A movie set resembling a rural radio station was constructed west of Valley Park in order to film a scene for the movie O Brother, Where Art Thou? (2000). In the movie, the "Soggy Bottom Boys" recorded Man of Constant Sorrow at radio station "WEZY". Only the mast tower remains at this location: 32.648775°N 90.939418°W.

== 2010 tornado ==
On April 24, 2010, Valley Park was the site of a strong tornado, though no injuries were reported. The supercell thunderstorm dropped another tornado in Yazoo City.

== Education ==
South Delta School District operates public schools serving the area, including South Delta High School.

== Notable people ==
- Buddie Newman, Speaker of the Mississippi House of Representatives from 1976 to 1988.
- J. C. Newman, father of Buddie Newman. Member of the Mississippi House of Representatives from 1931 to 1940 and 1944 to 1945.

== Gallery ==
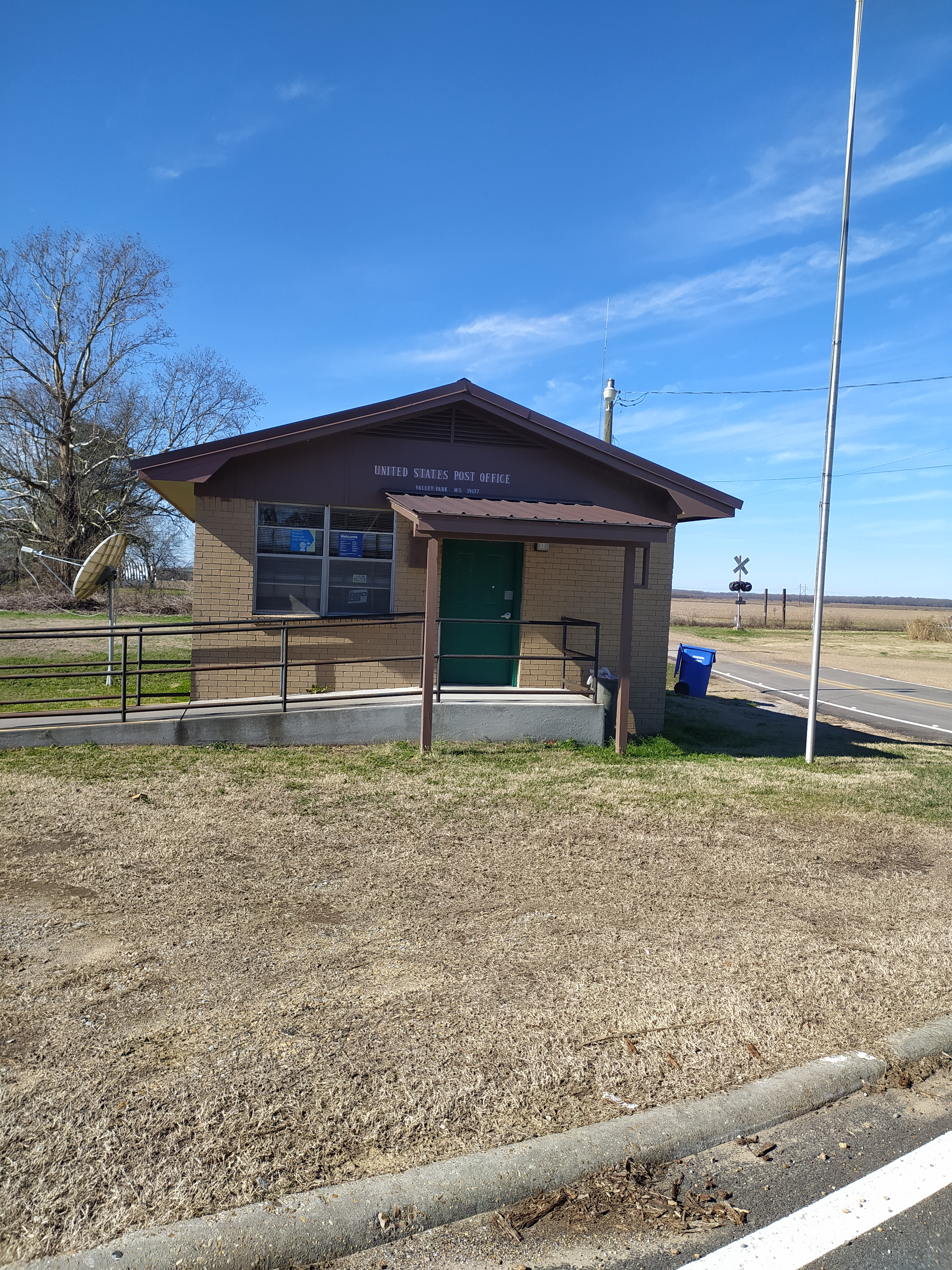
Valley Park Post Office
