= Fletcher Abram =

American handball player

Personal information
- Full name: Fletcher Abram, Jr.
- Born: December 12, 1950 (age 75) Cary, Mississippi, United States

Sport
- Sport: Handball

Fletcher Abram, Jr. (born December 12, 1950) is an American former handball player who competed in the 1972 Summer Olympics.

He was born in Cary, Mississippi, but lived in Chicago, Illinois during his sporting career.

In 1972 he was part of the American team which finished 14th in the Olympic tournament. He played three matches and scored two goals.

Abram also served in the U.S. Army in 1972.
