= Frank Newman Speller Award =

Engineering award

The Frank Newman Speller Award is an annual award for significant contributions to corrosion engineering and is administered by NACE International. (The organization was previously known as the National Association of Corrosion Engineers.) The award is named in honor of Frank Newman Speller, a Canadian-born American metallurgical engineer notable for his pioneering text on corrosion. The monetary value is $1000.

== Recipients ==
The following is the list of recipients as of 2021:

- 1947 - Frank Newman Speller
- 1948 - John M. Pearson
- 1949 - Francis L. LaQue
- 1950 - O.C. Mudd
- 1951 - Kirk H. Logan
- 1952 - Starr Thayer
- 1953 - Scott P. Ewing
- 1954 - E.H. Dix, Jr.
- 1955 - Gordon N. Scott
- 1956 - Mars G. Fontana
- 1957 - Walter F. Rogers
- 1958 - Robert J. Kuhn
- 1959 - A. Wachter
- 1960 - J.C. Hudson
- 1961 - K.G. Compton
- 1962 - C.P. Larrabee
- 1963 - Thomas P. May
- 1964 - Hugh P. Godard
- 1965 - F.W. Wink
- 1966 - Richard S. Treseder
- 1967 - John D. Sudbury
- 1968 - Lee P. Sudrabin
- 1969 - Charles G. Munger
- 1970 - Arland W. Peabody
- 1971 - Andrew Dravnieks
- 1972 - No recipient
- 1973 - Fred M. Reinhart
- 1974 - K.N. Barnard
- 1975 - Bernard Husock
- 1976 - E.H. Phelps
- 1977 - Walter K. Boyd
- 1978 - Joseph B. Cotton
- 1979 - M.C. Miller
- 1980 - H. Spahn
- 1981 - J.H. Morgan
- 1982 - Richard F. Stratful
- 1983 - Ernest W. Haycock
- 1984 - Warren E. Berry
- 1985 - Stanley L. Lopata
- 1986 - R.N. Miller
- 1987 - Einar Mattsson
- 1988 - Robert A. Baboian
- 1989 - A.J. Sedricks
- 1990 - M.E. Indig
- 1991 - Sheldon W. Dean
- 1993 - Bryan E. Wilde
- 1994 - S. Evans
- 1995 - P.R. Rhodes
- 1996 - Peter L. Andresen
- 1997 - Jacques-Philippe Berge
- 1998 - H. Okada
- 1999 - Herbert E. Townsend
- 2000 - Peter M. Scott
- 2001 - G. Schick
- 2002 - G.M. Gordon
- 2003 - R.W. Schutz
- 2004 - Boris A. Miksic
- 2005 - D. Knotkova-Cermakova
- 2006 - Masakatsu Ueda
- 2007 - Jorge A. González
- 2008 - David C. Silverman
- 2009 - Bruce Hinton
- 2010 - Andrew Garner
- 2011 - Pierre Combrade
- 2012 - William Hartt
- 2013 - John Beavers
- 2014 - Shunichi Suzuki
- 2015 - Jeffrey Gorman
- 2016 - David Shifler
- 2017 - Narasi Sridhar
- 2018 - Robert Tapping
- 2019 - U. Kamachi Mudali
- 2020 - Roy Johnsen
- 2021 - Jose Maria Bastidas

== See also ==
- List of engineering awards

== Sources ==
- "Frank Newman Speller Award - AMPP". AMPP.
- Awards, Honors & Prizes: An International Directory of Awards and Their Donors ... Gale Research Company. 1978. ISBN 978-0-7876-7806-7.
