= J. C. Newman =

Politician

Member of the Mississippi House of Representatives from Issaquena County
- In office 1944 – April 6, 1945
- Preceded by: John W. Heath
- In office 1931 – January 1940
- Preceded by: Robert E. Foster
- Succeeded by: Hubert B. Boykin

Personal details
- Born: Josephus Clarence Newman; November 3, 1884 Gallman, Mississippi, U.S.
- Died: April 6, 1945 (aged 60) Vicksburg, Mississippi, U.S.
- Party: Democratic
- Spouse: Minnie Belle Prine
- Children: At least 5, including Buddie

Josephus Clarence Newman Sr. (November 3, 1884 – April 6, 1945) was an American farmer and politician. Moving to Valley Park, Mississippi in 1917 to work as a foreman for the Illinois Central Railroad, he represented Issaquena County in the Mississippi House of Representatives. His fifth child, Buddie Newman was elected to the seat in 1951 and would go on to serve as Speaker of the House.

Mississippi House of Representatives
| Preceded by R. E. Foster | Mississippi Representative from Issaquena County; 1931–1936 | Succeeded by Hubert B. Boykin |
