= Sharkey-Issaquena Academy =

Segregation academy in Mississippi

Location
- Rolling Fork, Mississippi; United States; 32.9048576°N 90.8679148°W

Information
- Type: Private
- Established: 1970
- Grades: PK - 12
- Enrollment: 197 (2016)
- Athletics conference: MAIS
- Mascot: "Confederate"

Sharkey-Issaquena Academy is a private, nonsectarian, school in Rolling Fork, Mississippi. It was founded as a segregation academy in 1970.

== History ==
In 1970, one year after the United States Supreme Court decided Alexander v. Holmes County Board of Education, which ordered desegregation of schools, white parents opposed to integration doubled the enrollment of the SIA (from 150 to 300).

In 1982, Issaquena County public schools superintendent Dunbar Lee said he sent his children to Sharkey-Issaquena Academy because public school standards were not "what they were like before integration." Lee added that there were "so many more slow learners in public schools"

In 1989, the school forfeited a football game to Heritage Academy because the other school had a black player.

As late as 1995 the student body was 100% white.

In the 2009–2010 school year, there were 201 students enrolled (excluding pre-kindergarten). The demographic profile was 2.0% Asian, 1.0% black, 3.5% Hispanic, and 93.5% white.

In the 2015–2016 school year, Sharkey-Issaquena enrolled no Black children. In the 2017 school year, there were 184 students, 181 of whom were listed as white and 3 as hispanic.

The school served as a distribution center for relief supplies after the 2023 Rolling Fork tornado.

== About the school ==
Located at 272 Academy Drive in Rolling Fork, Mississippi, the school serves students in grades pre-kindergarten through twelve. The SIA is a member of the Midsouth Association of Independent Schools (MAIS) and its mascot is the Confederate. Neither pregnant students nor known fathers nor fathers-to-be are allowed to attend SIA.

== See also ==
- List of private schools in Mississippi
- South Delta School District and South Delta High School, the public schools
