= Lorenzen, Mississippi =

- Unincorporated community
- Location within Mississippi Location within the United States
- Coordinates: 32°56′55″N 90°54′23″W
- Country: United States
- State: Mississippi
- County: Sharkey
- Elevation: 105 ft (32 m)
- Time zone: UTC-6 (Central (CST))
  - Summer (DST): UTC-5 (CDT)
- Area code: 662
- GNIS feature ID: 672867

Lorenzen is an unincorporated community in Sharkey County, Mississippi, United States.

Lorenzen had a post office, and a population of 76 in 1906.

Lorenzen is located on the Yazoo and Mississippi Valley Railroad and in 1910 had a boot and shoe repair business. The community sporadically had a post office from 1889 to 1955.
