= Sharkey County, Mississippi =

County in Mississippi, United States

- County
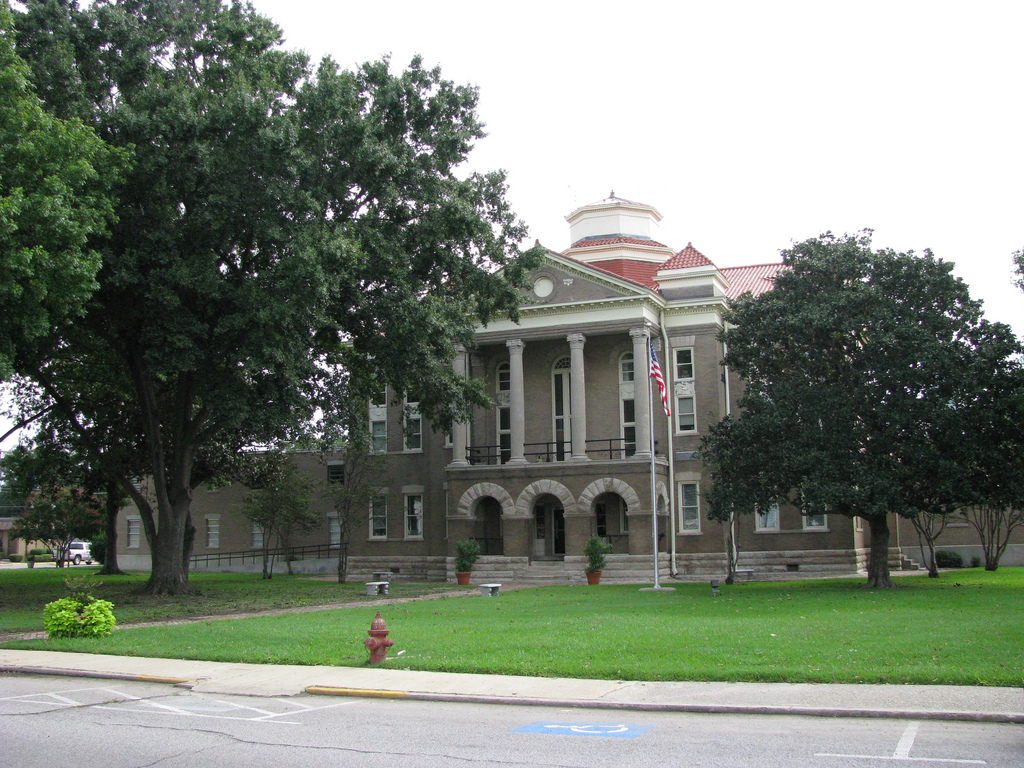
- Sharkey County Courthouse in Rolling Fork

- Location within the U.S. state of Mississippi
- Coordinates: 32°53′N 90°49′W
- Country: United States
- State: Mississippi
- Founded: 1876
- Named for: William L. Sharkey
- Seat: Rolling Fork
- Largest city: Rolling Fork

Area
  - Total: 435 sq mi (1,130 km^{2})
  - Land: 432 sq mi (1,120 km^{2})
  - Water: 3.4 sq mi (8.8 km^{2}) 0.8%

Population (2020)
  - Total: 3,800
  - Estimate (2025): 3,097 ▼
  - Density: 8.8/sq mi (3.4/km^{2})
- Time zone: UTC−6 (Central)
  - Summer (DST): UTC−5 (CDT)
- Congressional district: 2nd
- Website: www.sharkeycounty.net

Sharkey County is a county located in the U.S. state of Mississippi. Part of the eastern border is formed by the Yazoo River. According to the 2020 census, the population was 3,800, making it the second-least populous county in Mississippi, after Issaquena County. Its county seat is Rolling Fork. The county is named after William L. Sharkey, the provisional Governor of Mississippi in 1865.

Sharkey County is located in the Mississippi Delta region.

== Historic Weather ==
On the afternoon of Sunday, February 21, 1971, a large and long-tracked F5 tornado impacted areas of Sharkey County. On March 24, 2023, a high-end EF4 tornado hit the city of Rolling Fork with estimated wind speeds of 195 mph (314kph), causing catastrophic damage throughout the community. The tornado was responsible for 17 fatalities and 165 injuries.

== Geography ==
According to the U.S. Census Bureau, the county has a total area of 435 square miles (1,130 km^{2}), of which 432 square miles (1,120 km^{2}) is land and 3.4 square miles (8.8 km^{2}) (0.8%) is water.

=== Major highways ===
- U.S. Route 61
- Mississippi Highway 14
- Mississippi Highway 16

=== Adjacent counties ===
- Washington County (north)
- Humphreys County (northeast)
- Yazoo County (east)
- Issaquena County (southwest)

=== National protected area ===
- Delta National Forest
- Theodore Roosevelt National Wildlife Refuge (part)

== Demographics ==
Historical population
Census	Pop.	Note	%±
1880	6,306		—
1890	8,382		32.9%
1900	12,178		45.3%
1910	15,694		28.9%
1920	14,190		−9.6%
1930	13,877		−2.2%
1940	15,433		11.2%
1950	12,903		−16.4%
1960	10,738		−16.8%
1970	8,937		−16.8%
1980	7,964		−10.9%
1990	7,066		−11.3%
2000	6,580		−6.9%
2010	4,916		−25.3%
2020	3,800		−22.7%
2025 (est.)	3,097	▼	−18.5%
U.S. Decennial Census; 1790-1960 1900-1990; 1990-2000 2010-2013

=== Racial and ethnic composition ===
Sharkey County, Mississippi – Racial and ethnic composition Note: the US Census treats Hispanic/Latino as an ethnic category. This table excludes Latinos from the racial categories and assigns them to a separate category. Hispanics/Latinos may be of any race.
Race / Ethnicity (NH = Non-Hispanic)	Pop 1980	Pop 1990	Pop 2000	Pop 2010	Pop 2020	% 1980	% 1990	% 2000	% 2010	% 2020
White alone (NH)	2,689	2,337	1,911	1,366	962	33.76%	33.07%	29.04%	27.79%	25.32%
Black or African American alone (NH)	5,135	4,653	4,527	3,475	2,671	64.48%	65.85%	68.80%	70.69%	70.29%
Native American or Alaska Native alone (NH)	16	7	12	3	0	0.20%	0.10%	0.18%	0.06%	0.00%
Asian alone (NH)	17	21	17	11	14	0.21%	0.30%	0.26%	0.22%	0.37%
Native Hawaiian or Pacific Islander alone (NH)	x	x	0	0	3	x	x	0.00%	0.00%	0.08%
Other race alone (NH)	0	0	0	1	1	0.00%	0.00%	0.00%	0.02%	0.03%
Mixed race or Multiracial (NH)	x	x	27	21	88	x	x	0.41%	0.43%	2.32%
Hispanic or Latino (any race)	107	48	86	39	61	1.34%	0.68%	1.31%	0.79%	1.61%
Total	7,964	7,066	6,580	4,916	3,800	100.00%	100.00%	100.00%	100.00%	100.00%

As of the 2020 census, the county had a population of 3,800. The median age was 42.8 years. 23.2% of residents were under the age of 18 and 20.5% of residents were 65 years of age or older. For every 100 females there were 90.3 males, and for every 100 females age 18 and over there were 84.3 males age 18 and over.

The racial makeup of the county was 25.5% White, 70.8% Black or African American, <0.1% American Indian and Alaska Native, 0.5% Asian, 0.1% Native Hawaiian and Pacific Islander, 0.3% from some other race, and 2.7% from two or more races. Hispanic or Latino residents of any race comprised 1.6% of the population.

<0.1% of residents lived in urban areas, while 100.0% lived in rural areas.

There were 1,509 households in the county, of which 31.7% had children under the age of 18 living in them. Of all households, 29.9% were married-couple households, 21.9% were households with a male householder and no spouse or partner present, and 41.2% were households with a female householder and no spouse or partner present. About 33.1% of all households were made up of individuals and 14.9% had someone living alone who was 65 years of age or older.

There were 1,679 housing units, of which 10.1% were vacant. Among occupied housing units, 65.9% were owner-occupied and 34.1% were renter-occupied. The homeowner vacancy rate was 0.9% and the rental vacancy rate was 7.9%.

=== 2010 census ===
As of the 2010 United States census, there were 4,916 people living in the county. 71.0% were Black or African American, 27.9% White, 0.2% Asian, 0.1% Native American, 0.4% of some other race and 0.4% or two or more races. 0.8% were Hispanic or Latino (of any race).

=== 2000 census ===
As of the census of 2000, there were 6,580 people, 2,163 households, and 1,589 families living in the county. The population density was 15 people per square mile (5.8 people/km^{2}). There were 2,416 housing units at an average density of 6 units per square mile (2.3 units/km^{2}). The racial makeup of the county was 69.32% Black or African American, 29.36% White, 0.18% Native American, 0.27% Asian, 0.27% from other races, and 0.59% from two or more races. 1.31% of the population were Hispanic or Latino of any race.

There were 2,163 households, out of which 36.10% had children under the age of 18 living with them, 40.00% were married couples living together, 26.80% had a female householder with no husband present, and 26.50% were non-families. 23.50% of all households were made up of individuals, and 9.90% had someone living alone who was 65 years of age or older. The average household size was 2.99 and the average family size was 3.56.

In the county, the population was spread out, with 33.00% under the age of 18, 10.40% from 18 to 24, 24.80% from 25 to 44, 20.40% from 45 to 64, and 11.30% who were 65 years of age or older. The median age was 31 years. For every 100 females there were 88.70 males. For every 100 females age 18 and over, there were 82.40 males.

The median income for a household in the county was $22,285, and the median income for a family was $26,786. Males had a median income of $26,563 versus $17,931 for females. The per capita income for the county was $11,396. About 30.50% of families and 38.30% of the population were below the poverty line, including 50.00% of those under age 18 and 24.20% of those age 65 or over.

Sharkey County has the tenth-lowest per capita income in Mississippi and the 73rd lowest in the United States.

== Education ==
- Public School Districts
  - South Delta School District, which operates South Delta High School
- Private Schools
  - Sharkey-Issaquena Academy (Rolling Fork)

== Communities ==
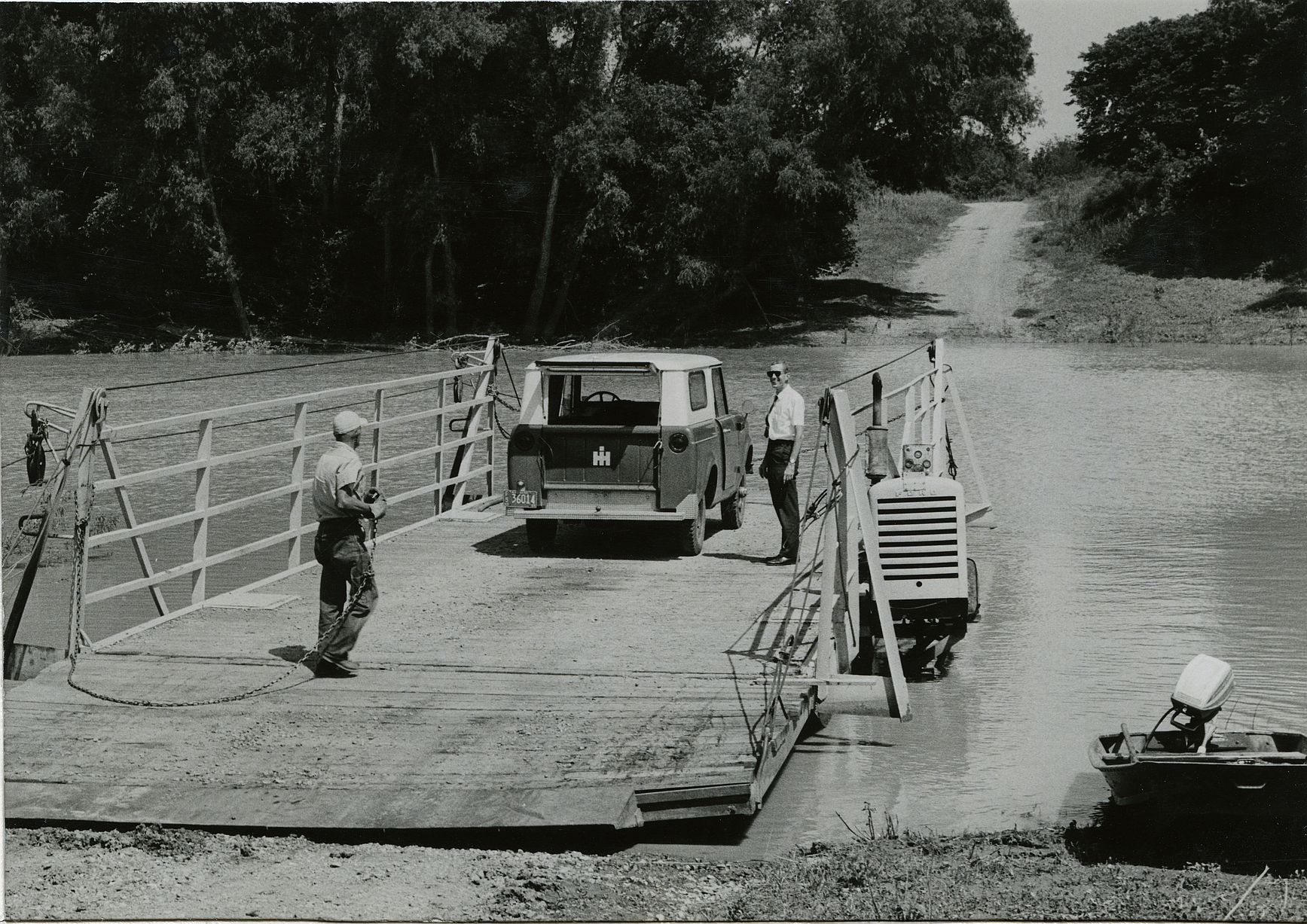
Crossing the Sunflower River by ferry southeast of Rolling Fork, 1965

=== City ===
- Rolling Fork (county seat)

=== Towns ===
- Anguilla
- Cary

=== Census-designated places ===
- Delta City
- Nitta Yuma
- Panther Burn

=== Unincorporated communities ===
- Egremont
- Issaquena
- Lorenzen
- Onward
- Patmos

== Politics ==
Sharkey County is, like the rest of the Mississippi Delta region, heavily Democratic. It has voted for the Democratic nominee for president in every election since 1976, and no Republican has broken 40% of the vote since George H. W. Bush in 1988. In the 2024 election, Sharkey was the only county in Mississippi that voted more Democratic than in 2020.

United States presidential election results for Sharkey County, Mississippi
Year	Republican		Democratic		Third party(ies)	
Year	No.	%	No.	%	No.	%
1912	3	1.79%	157	93.45%	8	4.76%
1916	6	2.36%	246	96.85%	2	0.79%
1920	7	2.98%	228	97.02%	0	0.00%
1924	34	8.65%	353	89.82%	6	1.53%
1928	36	7.05%	475	92.95%	0	0.00%
1932	0	0.00%	551	99.82%	1	0.18%
1936	7	1.22%	567	98.78%	0	0.00%
1940	18	2.35%	747	97.65%	0	0.00%
1944	24	3.32%	698	96.68%	0	0.00%
1948	10	1.29%	23	2.96%	745	95.76%
1952	600	60.73%	388	39.27%	0	0.00%
1956	211	25.36%	308	37.02%	313	37.62%
1960	313	31.08%	263	26.12%	431	42.80%
1964	1,116	89.71%	128	10.29%	0	0.00%
1968	249	10.34%	972	40.35%	1,188	49.32%
1972	1,426	67.94%	655	31.21%	18	0.86%
1976	1,024	41.81%	1,283	52.39%	142	5.80%
1980	996	32.97%	1,957	64.78%	68	2.25%
1984	1,487	43.76%	1,723	50.71%	188	5.53%
1988	1,277	43.00%	1,609	54.18%	84	2.83%
1992	1,008	36.63%	1,526	55.45%	218	7.92%
1996	906	34.59%	1,566	59.79%	147	5.61%
2000	1,074	37.00%	1,706	58.77%	123	4.24%
2004	1,120	36.21%	1,560	50.44%	413	13.35%
2008	873	31.23%	1,907	68.23%	15	0.54%
2012	737	29.11%	1,782	70.38%	13	0.51%
2016	692	31.60%	1,479	67.53%	19	0.87%
2020	688	31.52%	1,465	67.11%	30	1.37%
2024	551	31.20%	1,201	68.01%	14	0.79%

== See also ==
- National Register of Historic Places listings in Sharkey County, Mississippi
