= South Delta School District =

Public school district based in Rolling Fork, Mississippi, USA

Address
- 106 Athletic Drive Rolling Fork, Mississippi, 39159; United States
- Coordinates: 32.899754°N 90.878837°W

District information
- Type: Public
- Grades: PreK–12
- NCES District ID: 2803960

Students and staff
- Students: 684
- Teachers: 60.3
- Staff: 87.25
- Student–teacher ratio: 11.34

Other information
- Website: www.southdelta.k12.ms.us

The South Delta School District (SDSD) is a public school district based in Rolling Fork, Mississippi, USA.

The district serves all of Sharkey County, including the towns of Rolling Fork, Anguilla, and Cary, as well as the unincorporated areas of Delta City, Nitta Yuma, and Panther Burn. It also serves most of Issaquena County, including the town of Mayersville, the unincorporated area of Valley Park, and most of the unincorporated area of Grace.

Currently the district administration and the schools have differing sites, with the middle school being in Anguilla. Previously the elementary school, the high school, and the district administration were on the same site in Rolling Fork.

== Schools ==
- South Delta High School (Rolling Fork)
- South Delta Middle School (Anguilla)
- South Delta Elementary School (Rolling Fork)
- South Delta Vocational Complex ("VoTech")

== Administration ==
The High School Principal is Mr.Banks . The Middle School Principal is Mr.Matthews . The Elementary School Principal is Dr.Ginn

== Demographics ==
There were 1,178 students enrolled in the district in the 2007–2008 school year. The racial makeup of the district was 96.01% African American, 3.31% White, and 0.68% Hispanic. 91.97% of the district's students were eligible to receive free lunch.

The district, which is in one of the poorest regions in the United States, received $1.3 million in federal money in 2008 for programs to improve student achievement.

== Sports ==
At the High School, girls play softball, basketball and track, while boys play football, basketball, baseball and track.

== Discipline ==
Corporal punishment is administered unless parents request, by filling out a form, that it not be used on their student. In such a case, the student is suspended instead. An oak or ash wood paddle is used. There is a maximum of five licks per paddling and it must be applied to "the fleshy part of the buttocks". At the elementary school the paddle is 14 inches long, two inches wide and one-quarter inch thick. The secondary school uses a paddle 15 inches long, two inches wide and 3/8 inch thick.

== See also ==
- List of school districts in Mississippi
- Sharkey-Issaquena Academy - The area private school
