= Tavares Washington =

American football player (1983-2024)

No. 65, 74
- Position: Guard

Personal information
- Born: April 20, 1983; Greenville, Mississippi, U.S.
- Died: January 2, 2024 (aged 40); Fort Mill, South Carolina, U.S.
- Listed height: 6 ft 4 in (1.93 m)
- Listed weight: 315 lb (143 kg)

Career information
- High school: Rolling Fork (MS) South Delta
- College: Florida
- NFL draft: 2006: undrafted

Career history
- San Francisco 49ers (2006)*; Rhein Fire (2006); San Francisco 49ers (2007)*; Washington Redskins (2008)*; Kansas City Chiefs (2008); Las Vegas Locomotives (2009–2010)
- * Offseason or practice squad member only

Awards and highlights
- UFL champion (2009); First-team JUCO All-American (2002)

Career NFL statistics
- Games played: 2
- Stats at Pro Football Reference

Tavares Lajuan Washington (April 20, 1983 – January 2, 2024) was an American college and professional football player who was a guard in the National Football League (NFL) for a single season in 2008. He played college football for the University of Florida, and also played professionally for the Las Vegas Locomotives of the United Football League (UFL).

== Biography ==
Tavares Lajuan Washington was born in Greenville, Mississippi on April 20, 1983. He attended South Delta High School in Rolling Fork, Mississippi, and played high school football for the South Delta Bulldogs.

Washington accepted an athletic scholarship to attend the University of Florida in Gainesville, Florida, where he played for coach Ron Zook and coach Urban Meyer's Florida Gators football teams from 2002 to 2005.

In 2006, Washington was signed by the San Francisco 49ers as an undrafted free agent, and was a member of the 49ers' practice squad from 2006 to 2007. He was released by the 49ers in 2008, signed by the Washington Redskins and released. He was subsequently signed by the Kansas City Chiefs in 2008, and appeared in two of the Chiefs' regular season games.

Washington was a member of Las Vegas Locomotives of the UFL, and participated in the Locomotives' 2009 UFL championship.

Washington died in Fort Mill, South Carolina, on January 2, 2024, at the age of 40.
