= Oh Me Oh My (Lonnie Holley album) =

Studio album by Lonnie Holley
- Released: March 10, 2023
- Recorded: 2022
- Studio: The Garage, Topanga Canyon, California, United States
- Genre: Experimental music
- Length: 50:16
- Language: English
- Label: Jagjaguwar
- Producer: Jacknife Lee

Lonnie Holley chronology
Broken Mirror: A Selfie Reflection (2021)	Oh Me Oh My (2023)	Tonky (2025)

Oh Me Oh My is the 2023 studio album by American experimental musician and visual artist Lonnie Holley. It received positive reviews from critics.

== Reception ==
Professional ratings
Review scores
Source	Rating
AllMusic	3.5/5 stars
Mojo	4/5 stars
Pitchfork	8.5/10
Uncut	4/5 stars

According to the review aggregator Metacritic, Oh Me Oh My received "universal acclaim" based on a weighted average score of 81 out of 100 from six critic scores. Editors at AllMusic rated the album 3.5 out of 5 stars, with critic Paul Simpson writing that it has producer Jacknife Lee "honing Holley's freewheeling narratives and recollections into concise yet atmospheric songs". Andrew Perry of Mojo rated the album 4 out of 5 stars, characterizing it as "another electrifying blast of political exorcism and spiritual redemption from the American South's septuagenarian survivor hero" and "another uniquely memorable record, encapsulating its creator's restless spirit". In Paste, it was chosen as one of the 10 best albums of March 2023, with Josh Jackson praising the collaborations on the recording. Editors at Pitchfork called the album Best New Music of the week of March 15, 2023, with critic Zach Schonfeld scoring it 8.5 for its "tightly structured" songwriting, where "musical backdrops take on a cinematic life of their own". In Uncut, Sharon O'Connell rated Oh Me, Oh My a 4 out of 5, calling it "a bigger, bolder setting" than Holley's previous albums and writing that "his meditations, incantations and stream-of-consciousness musings have been given form and focus, where previously they wandered". In The Washington Post, John Lingan characterized the album as "another cathartic piece of expression" in Holley's catalog.

On November 27, the editors at Paste chose this as their 43rd best album of 2023. On December 5, it was ranked 37th best of 2023 by editors at Pitchfork. Uncut editor Michael Bonner included this album on his list of the best of the year. This was included in BrooklynVegan's listing of 33 great albums from indie/alternative legends.

== Track listing ==
All songs written by Lonnie Holley.

1. "Testing" – 3:26
2. "I Am a Part of the Wonder" – 5:49
3. "Oh Me, Oh My" – 5:50
4. "Earth Will Be Here" – 5:47
5. "Mount Meigs" – 4:26
6. "Better Get That Crop in Soon" – 4:22
7. "Kindness Will Follow Your Tears" – 4:37
8. "None of Us Have But a Little While" – 4:30
9. "If We Get Lost They Will Find Us" – 4:25
10. "I Can't Hush" – 4:51
11. "Future Children" – 2:21

== Personnel ==
- Lonnie Holley – Mellotron, vocals
- Matt Bishop – engineering
- John Davis – mastering
- Stephen Dress – upright bass
- Davis Hart – vocal engineering
- Mike Jensen – vocal engineering
- Miles Johnson – layout
- Jordan Katz – horn
- Rokia Koné – vocals
- Jacknife Lee – bass guitar, drums, dulcimer, Dulcitone, guitar, kalimba, keyboards, marimba, percussion, piano, pump organ, synthesizer, vocals, programming, engineering, mixing, production
- Joe Minter Sr. – artwork
- Moor Mother – vocals on "I Am Part of the Wonder"
- Jeff Parker – guitar
- Marlon Patton – drums
- Kelly Pratt – horn
- Davide Rossi – strings
- Michael Stipe – vocals on "Oh Me, Oh My"
- Sharon Van Etten – vocals
- Justin Vernon – guitar, drums, vocals

== See also ==
- 2023 in American music
- List of 2023 albums
