= Cary, Mississippi =

- Town
- Nickname: Small C.
- Location of Cary, Mississippi

- Location in the United States
- Coordinates: 32°48′20″N 90°55′29″W
- Country: United States
- State: Mississippi
- County: Sharkey

Area
  - Total: 0.71 sq mi (1.83 km^{2})
  - Land: 0.71 sq mi (1.83 km^{2})
  - Water: 0 sq mi (0.00 km^{2})
- Elevation: 102 ft (31 m)

Population (2020)
  - Total: 241
  - Density: 341/sq mi (131.6/km^{2})
- Time zone: UTC-6 (Central (CST))
  - Summer (DST): UTC-5 (CDT)
- ZIP code: 39054
- Area code: 662
- FIPS code: 28-11820
- GNIS feature ID: 2406228

Cary is a town in Sharkey County, Mississippi. The population was 241 at the 2020 United States census.

== Geography ==
According to the United States Census Bureau, the town has a total area of 5.7 square miles (15 km^{2}), all land.

== Demographics ==
Historical population
Census	Pop.	Note	%±
1930	419		—
1940	491		17.2%
1950	390		−20.6%
1960	428		9.7%
1970	517		20.8%
1980	470		−9.1%
1990	392		−16.6%
2000	427		8.9%
2010	313		−26.7%
2020	241		−23.0%
U.S. Decennial Census

=== Racial and ethnic composition ===
Cary town, Mississippi – Racial and ethnic composition Note: the US Census treats Hispanic/Latino as an ethnic category. This table excludes Latinos from the racial categories and assigns them to a separate category. Hispanics/Latinos may be of any race.
Race / Ethnicity (NH = Non-Hispanic)	Pop 2000	Pop 2010	Pop 2020	% 2000	% 2010	% 2020
White alone (NH)	148	109	80	34.66%	34.82%	33.20%
Black or African American alone (NH)	269	200	130	63.00%	63.90%	53.94%
Native American or Alaska Native alone (NH)	0	1	0	0.00%	0.32%	0.00%
Asian alone (NH)	3	2	0	0.70%	0.64%	0.00%
Native Hawaiian or Pacific Islander alone (NH)	0	0	0	0.00%	0.00%	0.00%
Other race alone (NH)	0	0	0	0.00%	0.00%	0.00%
Mixed race or Multiracial (NH)	0	1	26	0.00%	0.32%	10.79%
Hispanic or Latino (any race)	7	0	5	1.64%	0.00%	2.07%
Total	427	313	241	100.00%	100.00%	100.00%

=== 2020 census ===
As of the 2020 United States census, there were 241 people, 135 households, and 66 families residing in the town.

=== 2000 census ===
As of the census of 2000, there were 427 people, 146 households, and 107 families residing in the town. The population density was 584.4 inhabitants per square mile (225.6/km^{2}). There were 165 housing units at an average density of 225.8 per square mile (87.2/km^{2}). The racial makeup of the town was 64.40% African American, 34.66% White, 0.70% Asian, and 0.23% from two or more races. Hispanic or Latino of any race were 1.64% of the population.

There were 146 households, out of which 32.9% had children under the age of 18 living with them, 43.8% were married couples living together, 25.3% had a female householder with no husband present, and 26.7% were non-families. 24.7% of all households were made up of individuals, and 8.9% had someone living alone who was 65 years of age or older. The average household size was 2.92 and the average family size was 3.50.

In the town, the population was spread out, with 34.2% under the age of 18, 7.5% from 18 to 24, 27.4% from 25 to 44, 20.8% from 45 to 64, and 10.1% who were 65 years of age or older. The median age was 32 years. For every 100 females, there were 84.8 males. For every 100 females age 18 and over, there were 77.8 males.

The median income for a household in the town was $20,833, and the median income for a family was $23,750. Males had a median income of $21,375 versus $20,417 for females. The per capita income for the town was $11,372. About 31.0% of families and 36.7% of the population were below the poverty line, including 56.3% of those under age 18 and 12.7% of those, age 65 or over.

== Education ==
The town of Cary is served by the South Delta School District.

== Notable people ==
- Fletcher Abram, handball player who competed in the 1972 Summer Olympics
