= Issaquena, Mississippi =

Issaquena
- Unincorporated community
- Location within Mississippi Location within the United States
- Coordinates: 32°46′39″N 90°56′02″W
- Country: United States
- State: Mississippi
- County: Sharkey
- Elevation: 102 ft (31 m)
- Time zone: UTC-6 (Central (CST))
  - Summer (DST): UTC-5 (CDT)
- GNIS feature ID: 671744

Issaquena, also known as Valley Plantation, is an unincorporated community in Sharkey County, Mississippi, in the United States.

== History ==
"Issaquena" is a Choctaw word meaning "Deer River". The community was named from Deer Creek upon which it is located.

Issaquena is located on the former Illinois Central Gulf Railroad.

A post office operated under the name Issaquena from 1913 to 1921.
