= Bessie Harvey =

American sculptor (1929–1994)

- Harvey, Golden Dreams (n.d.)
- Born: Bessie Ruth White; October 11, 1929; Dallas, Georgia, United States
- Died: August 12, 1994 (aged 64); Alcoa, Tennessee, United States
- Education: Self-taught
- Known for: Sculpture

Bessie Harvey (born Bessie Ruth White; October 11, 1929 – August 12, 1994) was an American artist best known for her sculptures constructed out of found objects, primarily pieces of wood. A deeply religious person, Harvey's faith and her own interest in nature were primary sources for her work.

== Early life and family ==
Born Bessie Ruth White in Dallas, Georgia, she was the seventh of 13 children born to Homer and Rosie Mae White. As a child, she made toys and sculptures out of twigs. Overtime, these once simple structures grew in complexity - into the sculptures we see today. At the age of 14, Bessie married Charles Harvey and settled in Buena Vista, Georgia. She divorced Harvey in 1968 and relocated independently to Alcoa, Tennessee, where she was raising 11 children by the age of 35. As a child, she recalls making "something out of nothing," often creating her own toys and dolls.

In addition to having 11 children, Harvey had 28 grandchildren and three great-grandchildren.

== Career ==
In 1977, Harvey began working at Blount Memorial Hospital as a housekeeper. For extra income, at night while everyone was asleep Harvey would make dolls. She entered one of her sculptures, a work entitled "Banda", into the hospital's yearly art show which then sold, beginning her artistic career. One of the staff doctors introduced her to the directors of the Cavin-Morris Gallery in New York City, which continued to sell her work exclusively for several years.

== Works ==
Harvey's sculptures are made of found materials, predominantly wood branches and roots, which she then decorated with paint, glitter, jewelry, and other materials. Though she worked primarily with wood, Harvey also created sculptures from clay and some works on paper. She began creating art in 1974, shortly after her mother, Rosie White, died.

Harvey's work belongs to a larger tradition of black vernacular art created in the American South. The assemblage aspect of her work, the use of found materials, and emphasis on religious themes are common to the black vernacular art tradition. As a creator of visionary art, she often claims that God is the main source for her work, even to the extent that He is working through her: "I’m really not the artist. God is the artist in my work; nature and insects, they shape my work for me, because they belong to God. I belong to God, and all things belong to God, because it’s in his Word that all things are made to him, that without him there’s not anything made." According to Harvey, God allowed her to see anthropomorphic forms within the wood she worked with, and with that help she could give physical shape to the spiritual presences within these tree roots, limbs, and pieces of driftwood. Her interest in nature was due in part to her belief that she could access or see the spirit of her ancestors within trees, for example, and her general belief in transcendentalism.

Her work often reflected specific biblical stories, including stories from Genesis and Revelation. She also created a series of works inspired by the African-American experience in the United States. When naming her works, she frequently used an African-English dictionary to provide a direct connection to her African heritage.

== Exhibitions, holdings, and influence ==
Harvey's work has been included in over 50 exhibitions, including a posthumous inclusion in the 1995 Whitney Biennial. Her work Cross Bearers was subsequently purchased by the Whitney Museum for its permanent collection. She was also the subject of a major retrospective in 1997 at the Knoxville Museum of Art. Her works are in the permanent collections of the Knoxville Museum of Art the American Folk Art Museum, New York, and KMAC Museum in Louisville, Kentucky. Some of Harvey's works were also purchased from the Souls Grown Deep Foundation by the Fine Arts Museums of San Francisco as part of an acquisition of the works of African American artists from the Southern United States. This work was displayed in an exhibition called Revelations: Art from the African American South from June 3, 2017 through April 1, 2018. Her work is in the permanent collection of the National Gallery of Art, Washington DC, and included in the exhibit of Black American Artists of the American South Called to Create. Harvey's work continues to be featured in exhibitions in museums such as the Philadelphia Museum of Art and the Turner Contemporary in England as part of exhibitions on African American artwork from the American South.

Harvey has been cited as an influence by Alison Saar, and a street in Alcoa has been named after her.

== Selected exhibitions ==
Called To Create: Black Artists of the American South, National Gallery of Art, Washington, DC, September 18, 2022 – March 26, 2023.
