= Robert E. Foster =

American politician (1851–1931)

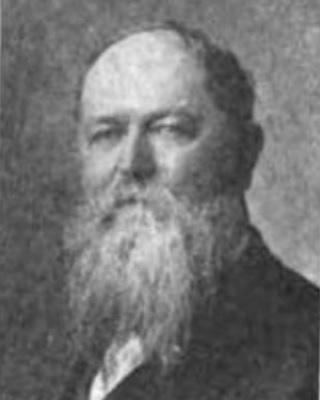
- Portrait of Foster, c. 1917

Member of the Mississippi House of Representatives from the Issaquena County district
- In office January 1912 – April 30, 1931
- Preceded by: Livingston Peyton
- Succeeded by: J. C. Newman

Personal details
- Born: Robert Elisha Foster; November 26, 1851 Linden, Mississippi, U.S.
- Died: April 30, 1931 (aged 79) Brandon, Mississippi, U.S.
- Party: Democratic
- Spouses: Nannie Elizabeth Heath (m. 1877; died 1913); Louise Lee White (m. 1917)

Robert Elisha Foster (November 26, 1851 – April 30, 1931) was a Democratic member of the Mississippi House of Representatives, representing Issaquena County, from 1912 to his death.

== Biography ==
Robert Elisha Foster was born on November 26, 1851, in Linden, Copiah County, Mississippi. He was the son of Milton Hunter Foster (c. 1823 – 1905), and his wife Hannah Elizabeth (Greenlee) Foster.

== Political career ==
From 1884 to 1910, Robert was a member and president of the Board of Supervisors of Issaquena County, Mississippi. He was first elected to the Mississippi House of Representatives, representing that county as a Democrat, on November 5, 1911. He was re-elected in 1915. He was also elected in 1919, 1923, and 1927, serving until his death. Foster, while still a member of the House, died after a two-week illness on April 30, 1931, in Brandon, Mississippi. At 79 years old, he was the oldest serving member of the Legislature at the time of his death. He was succeeded in the House by J. C. Newman.

== Personal life ==
He married Nannie E. Heath in 1877. They had three children, Annie Eliza (Foster) Ellis (b. 1877), Robert Heath Foster (b. 1885), and Mary Lurline (Foster) Donald (b. 1887). After Nannie's death, he married Louise Lee White in 1917. He had at least two children with Louise: Nannie E. Foster and Louise Foster.

Mississippi House of Representatives
Preceded by Livingston Peyton	Mississippi Representative from Issaquena County; 1912–1931	Succeeded by J. C. Newman
