= Frank Newman Speller =

American metallurgical engineer (1875–1968)

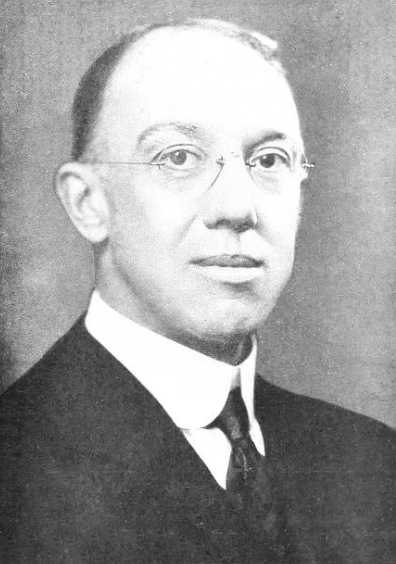
- Born: January 1, 1875; Toronto, Ontario, Canada
- Died: January 12, 1968 (aged 93); Buffalo, New York, US
- Education: University of Toronto
- Known for: Corrosion and metallurgy
- Awards: Longstreth Medal (1927); American Iron and Steel Institute Medal (1931); Max Hecht Award (1960)
- Scientific career
- Fields: Metallurgical engineer
- Workplaces: National Tube Company

Notes
- He is the grandfather of the organist Frank Newman Speller III.

Frank Newman Speller Sr (January 1, 1875 – January 12, 1968) was a Canadian born American metallurgical engineer notable for his pioneering text on corrosion in 1926. For his service to the field he won the Longstreth Medal (1927), American Iron and Steel Institute Medal and the Max Hecht Award (1960).

The Frank Newman Speller Award was named in his honor.

== Biography ==
Frank Newman Speller was born in Toronto in 1875.

He died at his son's home in Buffalo, New York on January 12, 1968.

== Books by Speller ==
- Frank Newman Speller, Corrosion, Causes and Prevention - an engineering problem, McGraw-Hill Book Company, Inc., New York, 1926, LCCN: 26010656.
