= Nitta Yuma, Mississippi =

- Census-designated place
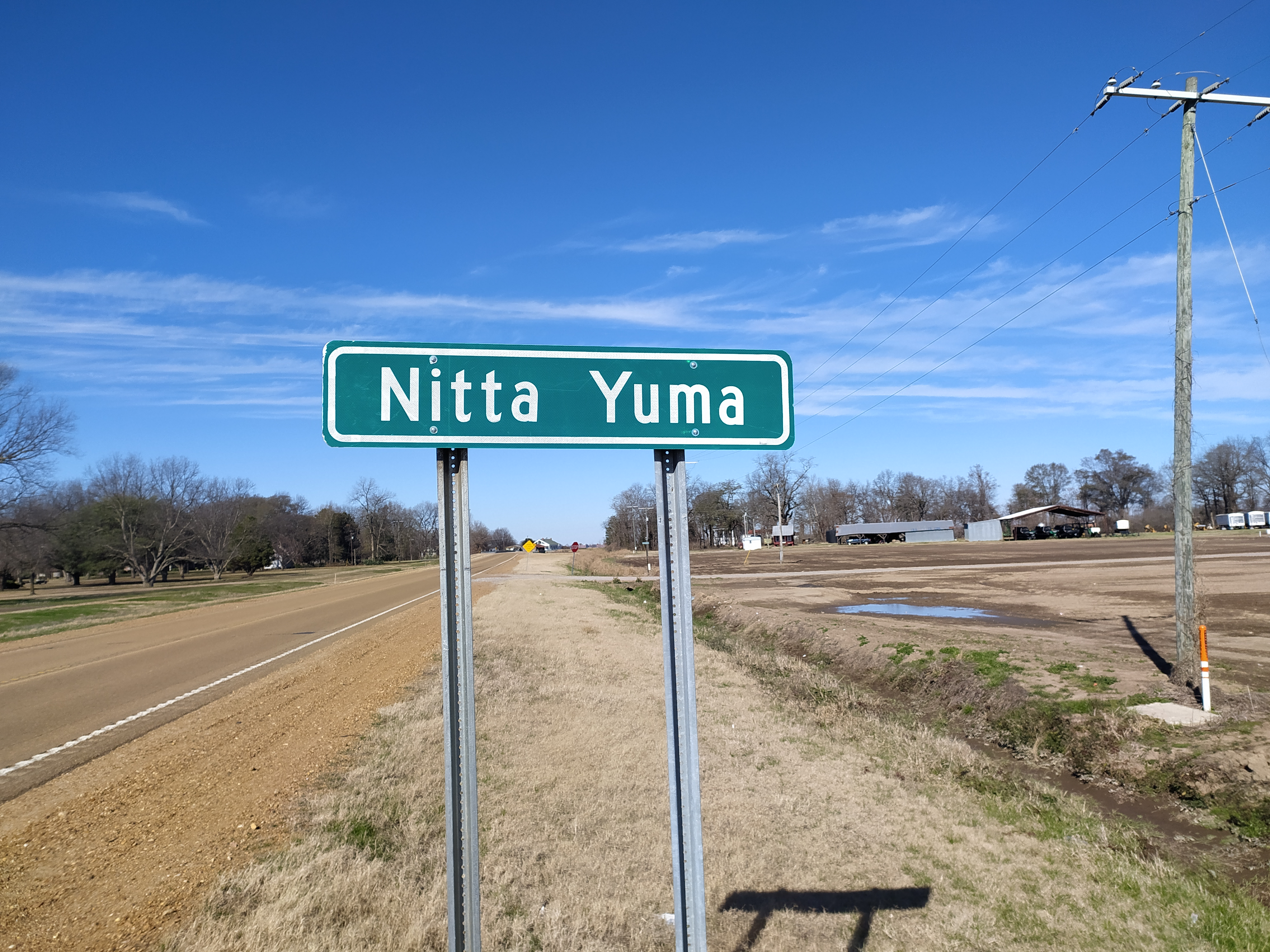
- Highway Sign outside of Nitta Yuma

- Location within Mississippi Location within the United States
- Coordinates: 33°01′25″N 90°50′55″W
- Country: United States
- State: Mississippi
- County: Sharkey

Area
  - Total: 0.19 sq mi (0.50 km^{2})
  - Land: 0.19 sq mi (0.50 km^{2})
  - Water: 0 sq mi (0.00 km^{2})
- Elevation: 108 ft (33 m)

Population (2020)
  - Total: 8
  - Density: 42/sq mi (16.1/km^{2})
- Time zone: UTC-6 (Central (CST))
  - Summer (DST): UTC-5 (CDT)
- Area code: 662
- GNIS feature ID: 2812740

Nitta Yuma is a census-designated place (CDP) and unincorporated community located in Sharkey County, Mississippi, United States. Nitta Yuma is located along U.S. Route 61, approximately four miles north of Anguilla.

The name Nitta Yuma is derived from the Choctaw language. The Choctaw had long occupied this area, for thousands of years before Europeans. The Vick and Willis families developed cotton plantations on Deer Creek after they were first surveyed and offered for sale by the federal government.

Per the 2020 Census, the population was 8.

== Demographics ==
Historical population
Census	Pop.	Note	%±
2020	8		—
U.S. Decennial Census; 2020

Nitta Yuma was first listed as a census designated place in the 2020 U.S. census.

=== 2020 census ===
Nitta Yuma CDP, Mississippi – Racial and ethnic composition Note: the US Census treats Hispanic/Latino as an ethnic category. This table excludes Latinos from the racial categories and assigns them to a separate category. Hispanics/Latinos may be of any race.
Race / Ethnicity (NH = Non-Hispanic)	Pop 2020	% 2020
White alone (NH)	0	0.00%
Black or African American alone (NH)	6	75.00%
Native American or Alaska Native alone (NH)	0	0.00%
Asian alone (NH)	0	0.00%
Pacific Islander alone (NH)	0	0.00%
Some Other Race alone (NH)	0	0.00%
Mixed Race or Multi-Racial (NH)	0	0.00%
Hispanic or Latino (any race)	2	25.00%
Total	8	100.00%

== Climate ==
The climate in this area is characterized by relatively high temperatures and evenly distributed precipitation throughout the year. According to the Köppen Climate Classification system, Nitta Yuma has a Humid subtropical climate, abbreviated "Cfa" on climate maps.

== Education ==
It is a part of the South Delta School District, which operates South Delta High School.

== Notable people ==
- Casey Jones, blues drummer

== Gallery ==
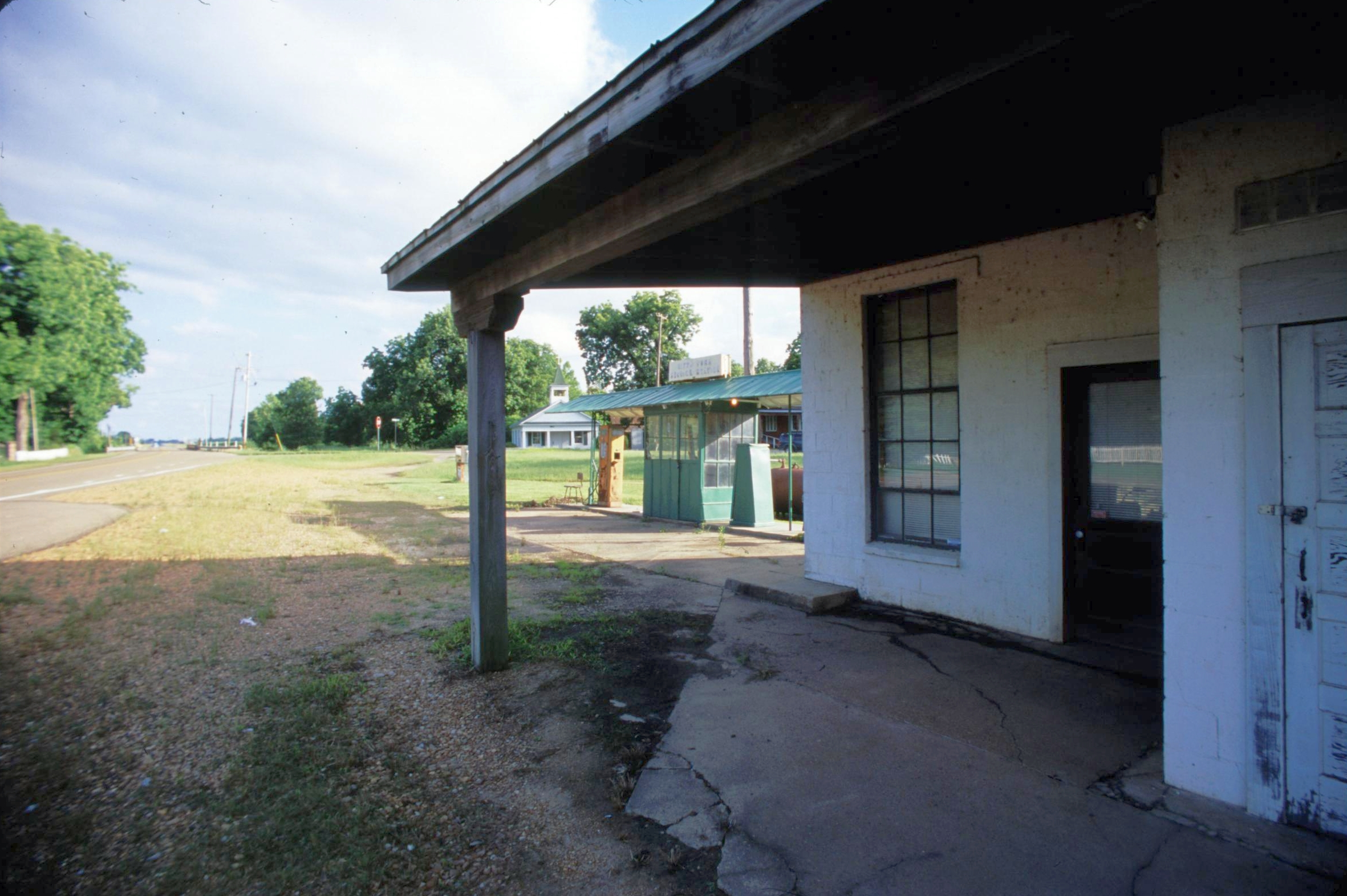
Building in Nitta Yuma

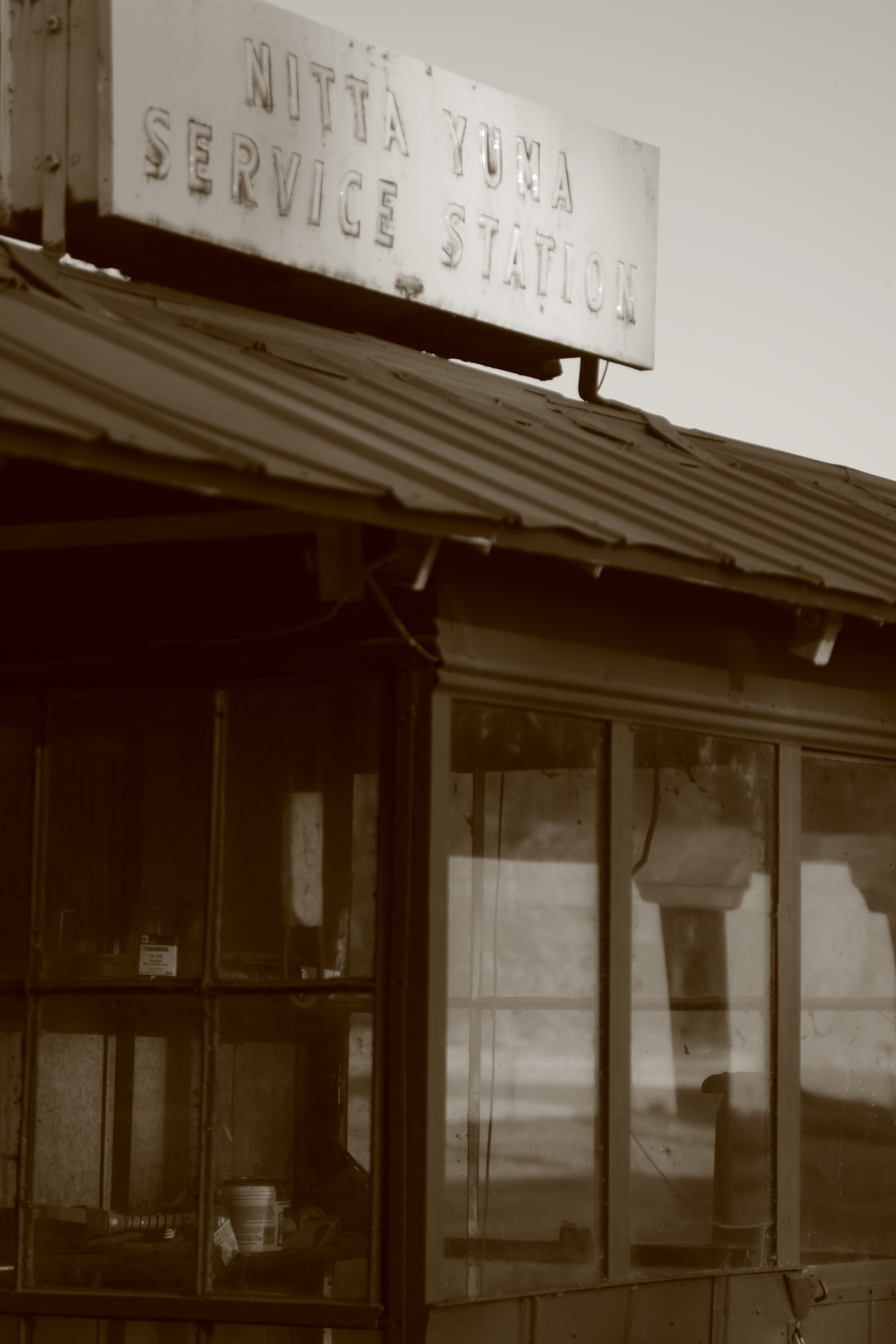
An old Nitta Yuma gas station

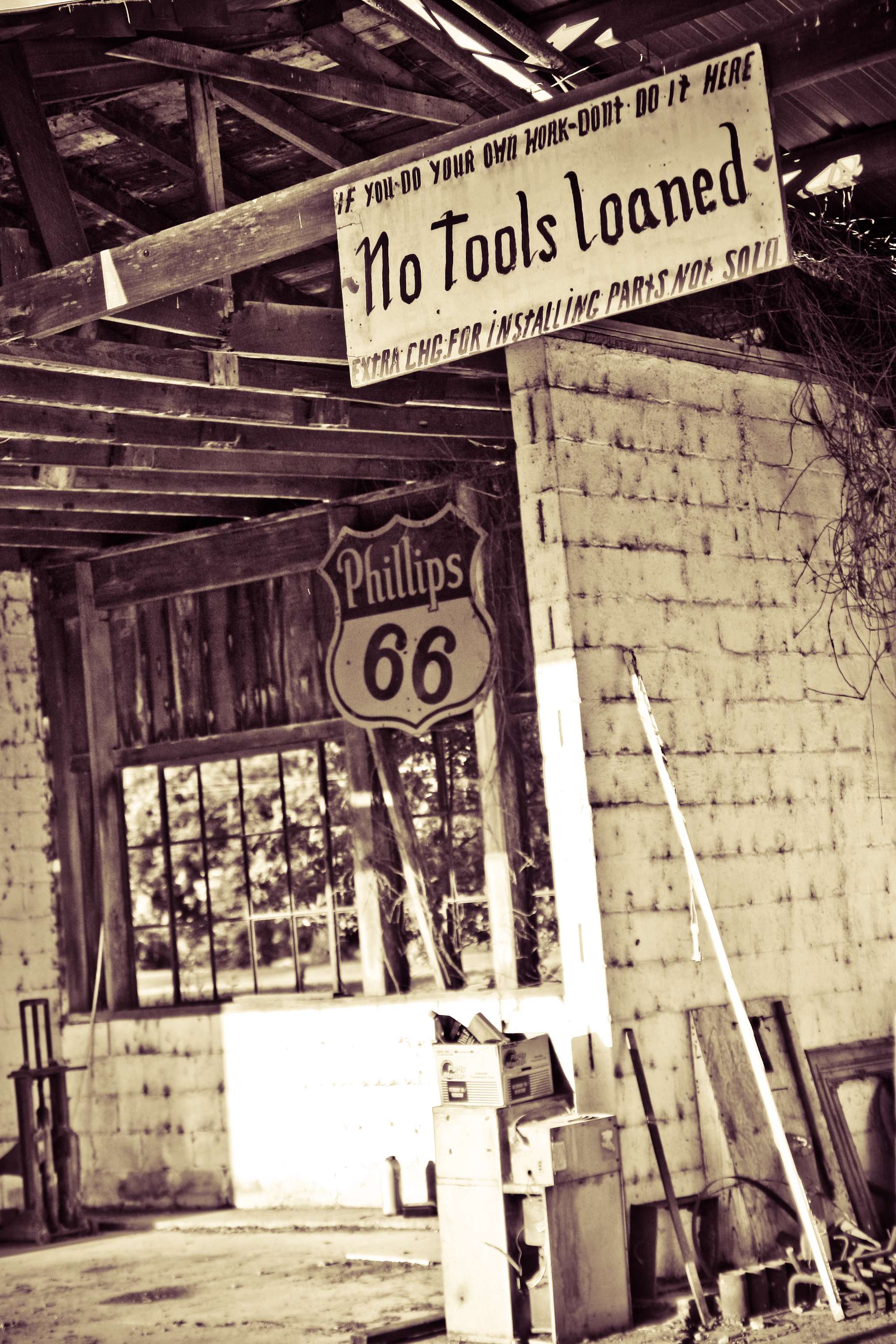
An old mechanic shop in Nitta Yuma
