= Patmos, Mississippi =

- Unincorporated community
- Location within Mississippi Location within the United States
- Coordinates: 32°48′47″N 90°43′42″W
- Country: United States
- State: Mississippi
- County: Sharkey
- Elevation: 95 ft (29 m)
- Time zone: UTC-6 (Central (CST))
  - Summer (DST): UTC-5 (CDT)
- ZIP code: 39088
- Area code: 662
- GNIS feature ID: 694325

Patmos is an unincorporated community located in Sharkey County, Mississippi, United States, along Mississippi Highway 16. Patmos is approximately 1.4 miles (2.3 km) west-southwest of Holly Bluff.

Patmos is located on the Sunflower River and in 1906 had a population of 20.

A post office operated under the name Patmos from 1897 to 1906.
