= Sylvia Speller =

German physicist

Sylvia Speller was born on June 17, 1967, in Haren, Germany. She is a German physicist who obtained her Dr. rer. nat. from the University of Osnabruck (1995) and has been a professor in the faculty of mathematics and natural sciences at the University of Rostock since 2012. She teaches and researches experimental physics, specifically, surface and interface physics, nanophysics, and scanning probe methods. Speller is currently a member of the German Physical Society.

== Education ==
After gaining her Abitur in Haren, Germany, she proceeded to attend the University of Osnabruck (1986–1992) where she studied physics. In 1995, she was awarded a Dr. rer. nat. by the University of Osnabruck, where she worked as a research associate (1992–1995). She continued her academic career as a postdoc and a scientific assistant (research fellow) at TU Eindhoven in the Netherlands, University of Osnabruck, and finally the University of Leuven in Belgium until 2001. She was then appointed as the full professor of experimental physics at the Radboud University in Nijmegen, Netherlands, until 2012. Finally, she became a professor at the University of Rostock, where she currently teaches and studies.

== Teaching and research areas ==
Speller works with surface and interface physics, nanophysics, and scanning probe methods. Surface and interface physics are sub-disciplines of solid state physics. Interface physics is the study of the small atomic layers that separate two distinct, and intimately connected, surfaces. By extension, surface physics seeks to better understand surfaces, a very simple type of interface, at an atomic level. Both of these niches are utilized primarily to analyze research questions regarding nanoscience, corrosion and catalysts research. Scanning probe methods, more commonly known as scanning probe microscopy, is a study centered around the tools used to make images of nanoscale structures and surfaces, like atoms.

Speller has made contributions to medical research and has been cited in numerous books. In some of her most recent work, focused on combatting shortcomings within the field of medical implantology, she sought to find a better design for longterm, tissue-integrated implants. Outside of her personal academic achievements, Speller has been cited in several books including Laser Ablation and Desorption and Nano-society: Pushing the Boundaries of Technology. Her work as a researcher has been useful in advancing knowledge across a variety of fields and disciplines.

== Publications (selected) ==
- den Boer, D., Li, M., Habets, T., Iavicoli, P., Rowan, A. E., Nolte, R. J. M., Speller, S., Amabilino, D. B., De Feyter, S., & Elemans, J. A. A. W. (2013). Detection of different oxidation states of individual manganese porphyrins during their reaction with oxygen at a solid/liquid interface. Nature Chemistry, 5 (7), 621–627. https://doi.org/10.1038/nchem.1667
- Hulsken, B., Van Hameren, R., Gerritsen, J. W., Khoury, T., Thordarson, P., Crossley, M. J., Rowan, A. E., Nolte, R. J. M., Elemans, J. A. A. W., & Speller, S. (2007). Real-time single-molecule imaging of oxidation catalysis at a liquid–solid interface. Nature Nanotechnology, 2 (5), 285–289. https://doi.org/10.1038/nnano.2007.106
