= Panther Burn, Mississippi =

Census-designated place in Sharkey County, Mississippi, United States

- Census-designated place
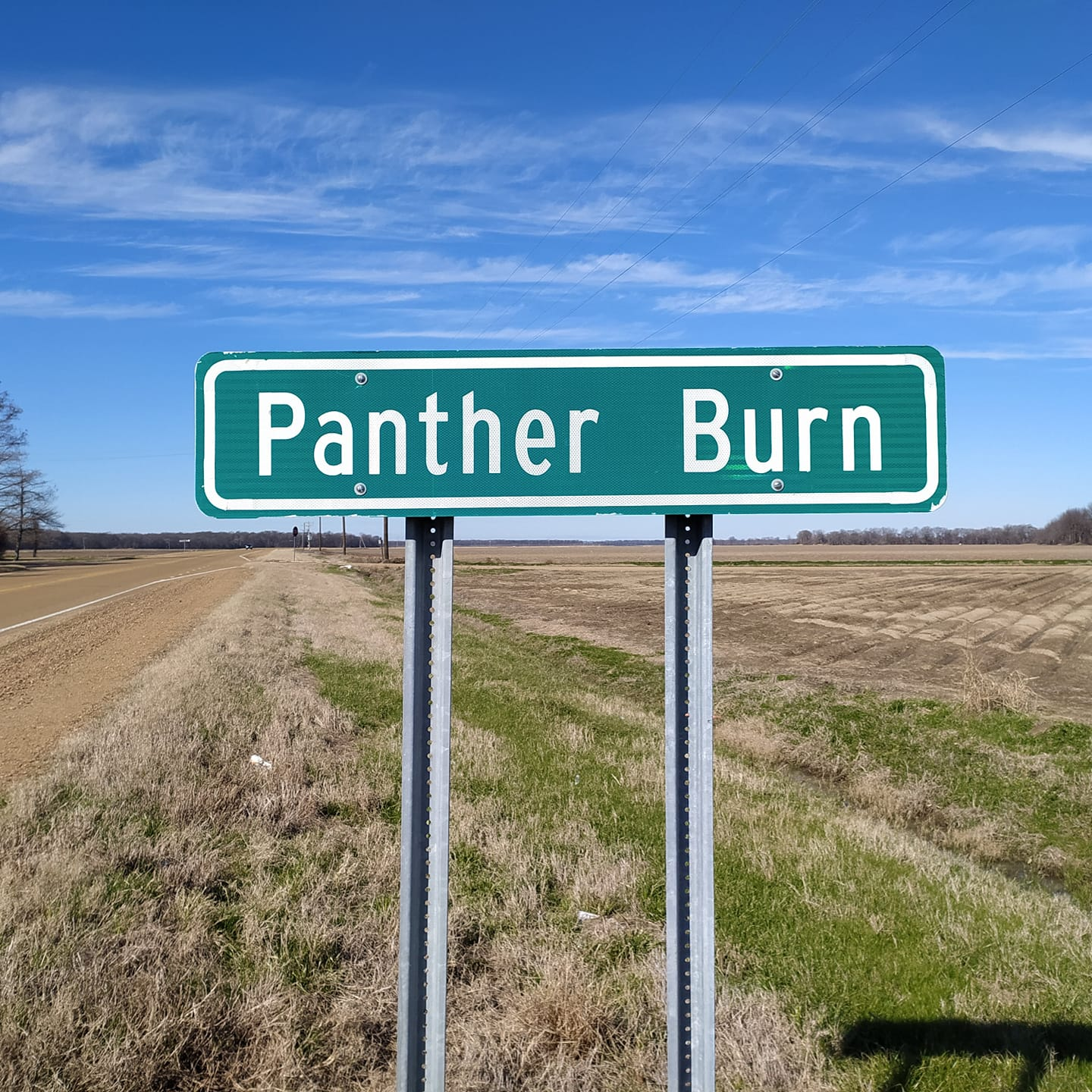
- Panther Burn road sign, January 2022

- Location within Mississippi Location within the United States
- Coordinates: 33°03′57″N 90°52′28″W
- Country: United States
- State: Mississippi
- County: Sharkey

Area
  - Total: 0.64 sq mi (1.67 km^{2})
  - Land: 0.64 sq mi (1.67 km^{2})
  - Water: 0 sq mi (0.00 km^{2})
- Elevation: 108 ft (33 m)

Population (2020)
  - Total: 115
  - Density: 178.8/sq mi (69.05/km^{2})
- Time zone: UTC-6 (Central (CST))
  - Summer (DST): UTC-5 (CDT)
- Area code: 662
- GNIS feature ID: 2812742

Panther Burn is a census-designated place (CDP) along U.S. Route 61 in northwestern Sharkey County, Mississippi, United States. It has a post office with the ZIP code of 38765.

Per the 2020 Census, the population was 267.

== Demographics ==
Historical population
Census	Pop.	Note	%±
2020	115		—
U.S. Decennial Census; 2020

Panther Burn was first listed as a census designated place in the 2020 U.S. census.

=== 2020 census ===
Panther Burn CDP, Mississippi – Racial and ethnic composition Note: the US Census treats Hispanic/Latino as an ethnic category. This table excludes Latinos from the racial categories and assigns them to a separate category. Hispanics/Latinos may be of any race.
Race / Ethnicity (NH = Non-Hispanic)	Pop 2020	% 2020
White alone (NH)	3	2.61%
Black or African American alone (NH)	115	97.39%
Native American or Alaska Native alone (NH)	0	0.00%
Asian alone (NH)	0	0.00%
Pacific Islander alone (NH)	0	0.00%
Some Other Race alone (NH)	0	0.00%
Mixed Race or Multi-Racial (NH)	0	0.00%
Hispanic or Latino (any race)	0	0.00%
Total	115	100.00%

== Education ==
It is a part of the South Delta School District, which operates South Delta High School.

== Popular culture ==
Panther Burn is the setting of Alice Walker's short story "Roselily", the opening story in her first short story collection, In Love and Trouble: Stories of Black Women.

The band Tav Falco's Panther Burns, which originated in nearby Memphis, takes its name from the community.

== Notable people ==
- Henry Speller, artist and blues musician

== See also ==
- List of census-designated places in Mississippi
