= Angel Bat Dawid =

American jazz musician

- Angel Bat Dawid (right) with Alice Diop in 2026

Background information
- Born: Angel Elmore; 1979 (age 46–47); Atlanta, Georgia, US
- Origin: Chicago, Illinois, US
- Occupations: Composer; clarinetist; pianist; vocalist; record producer; educator; DJ
- Years active: 2010s–present
- Labels: International Anthem; Spiritmuse

Angel Elmore (born 1979), better known as Angel Bat Dawid, is an American composer, clarinetist, pianist, vocalist, record producer, educator, and DJ.

== Life and career ==
Angel Elmore was born in Atlanta, Georgia. Her father attended Morehouse College, and after marrying Dawid's mother, the family moved to her father's hometown of Louisville, Kentucky. In 1986, they moved to Kenya, where her parents served as Southern Baptist missionaries for four years. They then returned to Louisville when Dawid was 12. During her teenage years, the family relocated to Chicago, Illinois, as her parents pursued ministry opportunities. Dawid's parents now identify as Black Hebrew Israelites. She attended Moody Bible Institute and Roosevelt University. "Bat Dawid" in her stage name is a Hebrew phrase for "daughter of David".

== Recognition ==
Dawid was honored as 2021 "Chicagoan of the Year in Jazz" by the Chicago Tribune. She is on Pitchfork's Next 25 list of emerging artists to look out for, and was also New York Winter Jazz Festival 2022 Artist in Residence premiering her latest composition "Afro Town Topics: An Afrofuturist Mythological Musical Revue".

== Discography ==
=== Albums ===
- The Oracle (International Anthem, 2019)
- Live (with Tha Brothahood; International Anthem, 2020)
- Hush Harbor Mixtape No. 1: Doxology (International Anthem, 2021)
- Requiem for Jazz (Intergalactic Mantra, 2023)
- Journey to Nabta Playa (Spiritmuse, 2025)
