= Frank Speller =

American musician

Frank Newman Speller III (July 24, 1938 in Tyler, Texas – May 15, 2017 in Austin, TX) was an Associate Professor Emeritus of Organ at the University of Texas at Austin. He has appeared in recitals in Europe, the United States, on National Public Radio, and in one national and three regional conventions of the American Guild of Organists.

His organ and choral compositions are published by various American editors, and two commercial compact discs of his works have been released by Albany and Pro Organo. Speller was integral in developing the Visser-Rowland organ of University of Texas Austin, the largest American-built tracker organ when it was completed in 1981 (several much larger foreign-built tracker organs already existed in the US). He holds a D.M.A., University of Colorado Boulder; Performer’s Certificate, Indiana University School of Music, and studied in Paris with Jeanne Demessieux.

He is the grandson of Frank Newman Speller, Sr.
