= Henry Speller =

American artist and musician

- Henry Speller, 1987
- Born: 1900; Panther Burn, Mississippi, US
- Died: 1997 (aged 96–97); Memphis, Tennessee, US
- Known for: Drawing; painting
- Movement: Modern Art

Henry Speller (1900–1997) was an American artist and blues musician working in Memphis, Tennessee. His style of drawing and painting is characterized by ornate, colorful, intimidating figures which he likened to "characters from Dallas".

== Life ==
Henry Speller was the eldest son of Rosie Edwards and Robert Speller. He was raised by his mother's parents, Ike and Zannie Simpson, in the Panther Burn settlement of Rolling Fork, Mississippi. They were a sharecropping family, mostly on cotton fields, and Henry attended school until he was twelve years old. He then began full-time farm labor to support his grandmother after his grandfather was forced to flee Panther Burn after an altercation with a white employer, who threatened his life. Eventually the whole family moved to northern Mississippi. Speller dreamed of going North as part of the Great Migration.

Speller married three times. In the 1930s he married Elnora Davis, only to separate shortly thereafter. Between 1939 and 1941, he married Mary Lee Shorter, who was from Memphis, Tennessee. Seeing an opportunity to move even a little further north, Speller and Mary moved to Memphis in 1941. Together, he and Mary had five children before their divorce.

In Memphis, he worked a succession of day-labor jobs, and by night played blues at venues on the neighboring, historic Beale Street. Speller was an accomplished blues musician who played with Muddy Waters and Howlin' Wolf. When Howlin' Wolf moved to Chicago, he urged Speller to join him and become a part of his permanent ensemble, but Speller declined, saying Chicago was too cold for him. He retired from working as a grounds keeper for the Memphis city parks commission in the mid-1960s.

A few years before his retirement, Speller met Georgia Verges, a fellow artist. They married in 1964 and had a "near perfect marriage", according to Speller's son William. They had no children together. Georgia was also a painter whose subjects were often undulating figures engaged in multi-person orgies set on colorful landscapes. She became very ill in the mid-1980s and stopped creating work a few years before her death in 1988. Speller's art and health declined soon after her death. He began to lose his sight in 1990, and therefore the will and ability to make art. He died in 1997.

== Career ==
Henry Speller began drawing and painting when he moved to Memphis, Tennessee, in 1941. He also collected used, discarded materials to fix, re-appropriate, or sell while he worked for the Memphis sanitation department.

=== Materials ===
Throughout his career, Speller maintained a preference for large format paper for his drawings, typically 19 in × 20 in (480 mm × 510 mm). He outlined his subjects in graphite pencil, then filled in the figures and block patterns with crayons or colored pencils. All of his works fill the page to the edges, except his renderings of single figures, which stand alone against a white background. Speller made thousands of drawings in his life-time. Hundreds survived his many moves across Memphis.

=== Subjects ===
Speller is best known for his drawings of detailed houses, modes of transportation (trains, cars, riverboats, and planes), and adorned figures, particularly women. His figures are often white women with angular faces, round breasts made of concentric circles, and exposed genitals with common southern white names, like "Katie Mae" and "Lisa Jean". Through these characters, Speller creates a metaphor for mobility and freedom in the Jim Crow South, which white women, and even some black women, can attain, but are inaccessible to him.

Patterns play a crucial role in Speller's composition. Stripes and grids function as movement from one plane to another, such as from clothes to skin or from inside to outside of a building. Art historians have drawn a connection between Speller's patterns and African American quilt-making traditions, with their improvised rectangular and square grids.

Slipping daily between unending manual labor and the solace of blues nightclubs brought forth the contrasts in Speller's work. His visual style, and those that mimic it, has become known as "blues aesthetic." Blues music influences this visual aesthetic by creating fantasy from pain observed first-hand. "This theme in turn fits within the realm of the grotesque and the abject, depicting a shifting, wavy body that threatens to exceed containment."

== Exhibitions ==
Speller's work has been featured in the following exhibitions:

- Black American Folk Art: Henry Speller, Mose Tolliver, Bill Traylor. 1983, Haupert Union Building, Moravian College, Bethlehem, PA.
- Southern Folk Images: David Butler, Henry Speller, Bill Traylor. 1984, University of New Orleans, New Orleans, LA.
- Baking in the Sun: Visionary Images from the South: selections from the collection of Sylvia and Warren Lowe. Jun 13- July 31, 1987, University Art Museum, University of Southeastern Louisiana. Lafayette, LA.
- Gifted Visions: Black American Folk Art, 1988, Atrium Gallery, University of Connecticut, Storrs, CT.
- Outside the Mainstream: Folk Art in Our Time. May–Aug 1988, High Museum of Art at Georgia-Pacific Center, Atlanta, GA.
- American Resources: Selected Works of African American Artists, Aug 26- September 24, 1989, Bernice Steinbaum Gallery, New York, NY.
- Gifted Visions: African American Folk Art. Jan 27- February 24, 1990, University Art Gallery, University of Massachusetts, Dartmouth, MA.
- Orphans in the Storm. Nov 1- Dec 31, 1991, 10 2 1 Gallery, Birmingham, AL..
- Contemporary American Folk Art: The Balsley Collection, 1992, Patrick and Beatrice Haggerty Museum of Art, Marquette University, Milwaukee, WI.
- Free Within Ourselves: African American Artists in the Collection of the National Museum of American Art. 1992, National Museum of American Art, Washington D.C.
- Unsigned, Unsung, Whereabouts Unknown!: Make-Do Art of the American Outlands. Feb 5- March 7, 1993, Florida State University Art Gallery and Museum, Tallahassee, FL.
- Fundamental Soul: The Hager Gift of Self-Taught African American Art. Jan 26- Mar 10, 1996, Rockford Art Museum, Rockford, IL.
- Wrestling with History: A Celebration of African American Self-Taught Artists from the Collection of Ronald and June Shelp. 1996, Baruch College, CUNY, New York, NY.
- Drawing Outside the Lines: Works on Paper by Outsider Artists, 1996, Noyes Museum of Art, Oceanville, NJ.
- Outsider Art: An Exploration of Chicago Collections. Dec 9, 1996- February 3, 1997, Chicago Cultural Center, Chicago, IL.
- Wind in My Hair, May 1996- May 1997, American Visionary Art Museum, Baltimore, MD.
- Drawings in the Spirit of 9, 1997, Atrium Gallery, University of Connecticut, Storrs, CT.
- Noah's Ark: Animals by Southern Self-Taught Artists. 1998, Art Museum of the University of Memphis, Memphis, TN.
- Love: Error and Eros. May 16, 1998 - May 30, 1999, American Visionary Art Museum, Baltimore, MD.
- Southern Spirit: The Hill Collection. Feb 21- March 31, 2000, Museum of Art, Tallahassee, FL.
- Stories of Community: Self-Taught Art from the Hill Collection. Aug 12 - Oct 30, 2004, Museum of Arts and Sciences, Macon, GA.
- The Souls of Black Folk: Selections of African American Folk Art from the Museum's Permanent Collection. Nov 28, 2004- ongoing, Museum of African American Life and Culture, Dallas, TX.
- Fun!, Jun 29- Jul 28, 2006, Luise Ross Gallery, New York, NY.
- Portraits: Outsider Artists, Fall, 2006, Robert Cargo Folk Art Gallery, Paoli, PA.
- Amazing Grace: Self-Taught Artists from the Mullis Collection. Sep 29, 2007- January 6, 2008, Georgia Museum of Art, Athens, GA.
- All Folk. Aug 19- October 2, 2010, Barbara Archer Gallery, Atlanta, GA.
- Pure Folk: Celebrating the Folk Art Society of America. Sep 14- Nov 10, 2012, Barbara Archer Gallery, Atlanta, GA
- When the Stars Begin to Fall: Imagination in the American South. Mar 27- June 29, 2014, Studio Museum in Harlem, New York, NY.
- Called to Create: Black Artists of the American South at National Gallery of Art, 18 Sept 2022 – 26 March 2023

== Collections ==
Speller's work is currently in the following museums' permanent collections:

- Metropolitan Museum of Art
- Minneapolis Institute of Art
- The Brooklyn Museum
- The Morgan Library & Museum
- High Museum of Art
- Smithsonian American Art Museum
- collection de l'Art brut, Lausanne, Switzerland
- American Folk Art Museum
- Treger Saint Silvestre collection, Porto, Portugal
- Mississippi Museum of Art
- Rockford Art Museum, Rockford, U.S.
- St. Jame Place Folk Art Museum, Robersonville, U.S.
- The Old Capitol Museum of Mississippi History, Jackson, U.S.
- White Hall Gallery, Richmond, U.S.
- U.S. National Gallery of Art
