= Georgia Speller =

American artist (1931–1988)

- Georgia Speller on her front porch in Memphis, Tennessee
- Born: Georgia Verges; 1931; Aberdeen, Mississippi
- Died: 1988 (aged 56–57); Memphis, Tennessee
- Known for: Painting; drawing
- Movement: Contemporary Art

Georgia Speller (1931–1988) was an African American artist known for her colorful, dynamic drawings and paintings on paper.

== Early life ==
Speller grew up the daughter of a blacksmith in northeast Mississippi, in a town called Aberdeen. She learned to draw at a young age, but did not hone her craft until she was encouraged to do so by her husband, artist Henry Speller.

== Career ==
Speller's evolution as an artist alongside her husband was outlined in an interview:

She had learned to draw as a child but became actively involved in her art only after being encouraged by her husband. It was an important element of their life together. They often engaged in playful yet serious competition, drawing the same subjects and comparing results. "I ain't near as good as Henry" was her assessment. "She done come to be a whole lot better than me" was his.

Most of Speller's oeuvre comprises orgiastic, ecstatic scenes of revelry in nature. These orgies often show the Moon and Sun simultaneously in the sky, which has been interpreted as implying a duration, not an instant. Women are depicted as mutually benefiting or dominant intimate partners. Art historian Xenia Zed saw in Speller's work "the revisionist feminist of the nineties; the sexual exhibitionists of the sixties and seventies; the romantic/erotic/pornographic gaze; the symbolic that can range from thoughts on African retention to psychoanalysis."

Speller's work often includes architectural paintings and drawings of houses, train stations, and cityscapes.

== Collections ==
Works by Speller are in the collections of the Metropolitan Museum of Art, the High Museum of Art, Minneapolis Institute of Art, and the National Gallery of Art.
