= Joe Minter =

American artist

- Born: Joe Wade Minter Sr; March 28, 1943 (age 83); Birmingham, Alabama

Joe Minter (born March 28, 1943) is an African American sculptor based in Birmingham, Alabama. His African Village in America, on the southwest edge of Birmingham, is an ever-evolving art environment populated by sculptures he makes from scrap metal and found materials; its theme is recognition of African American history from the first arrivals of captured Africans to the present. Individual pieces from Minter's thirty-year project have been in major exhibitions in the United States and are in the permanent collections of the National Gallery of Art, the Smithsonian American Art Museum, and the Metropolitan Museum of Art, among others.

== Early life ==
Minter was born in Birmingham, Alabama, the eighth child into a family of ten. His father was a mechanic during World War I, but after the war, was unable to find a job in his field. Minter's father instead worked for thirty years as caretaker of a white cemetery. Joe Minter attended local Birmingham schools, was drafted in 1965 and discharged in 1967. After the military, Minter took a series of low-paying jobs, from dishwasher at a drive-in, to messenger and orderly hospital work. Minter also worked in metals, constructed school furniture, did work on cars, and with crews building roads. As a result of his fabrication work, Minter got asbestos dust in his eyes in the 1960s and ‘70s. Minter had one eye operated on to mediate the asbestos; however, he wouldn't let the doctors operate the other eye. Minter never lost the feeling of grit in his eyes and was forced to retire. Upon retiring, Minter rediscovered an artistic practice dormant since childhood.

== Artistic practice ==
=== African Village in America ===
Situated on the southwest edge of Birmingham, Alabama, Minter's African Village in America was initiated in the late 1980s and constructed over 30 years. Serving as a sculpture garden, history museum, and memorial, the African Village in America represents a continually evolving art environment. The site features sculptures assembled from scrap and found materials, including footwear, lawn decorations, toys, old sporting equipment, and baking utensils. Minter's sculptures address a wide range of themes and influences. For instance, one sculpture commemorates the Sandy Hook Elementary School shooting, while another is dedicated to the victims of Hurricane Katrina. The central message of Minter's work is to acknowledge the 388,000 Africans forcibly transported to America and to honor their descendants who contributed to building and defending the nation. The sculptures collectively narrate the experiences of African Americans across centuries, from the griots and warriors of West Africa to the victims of the 1963 bombing at the 16th Street Baptist Church.

=== Exhibitions ===
- 2022 – Called to Create: Black Artists of the American South – National Gallery of Art – curated by Harry Cooper
- 2019 – Whitney Biennial – Whitney Museum of American Art – curated by Rujeko Hockley and Jane Panetta
- 2018 – History Refused to Die: Highlights from the Souls Grown Deep Foundation Gift - Metropolitan Museum of Art
- 2018 - Revelations: Art from the African American South - de Young Museum, San Francisco, CA
- 2018 - Joe Minter: Once That River Starts to Flow - Atlanta Contemporary, Atlanta, Georgia
- 2017 - The Road Less Traveled Exhibition Series. American Sites: Art Environment Photography - The John Michael Kholer Arts Center, Sheboygan, WI
- 2015 - History Refused to Die - Alabama Contemporary Art Center, Mobile, AL
- 2014 - When Stars Begin to Fall: Imagination and the American South - Studio Museum in Harlem, New York
- 2007 - Alabama Folk Art - Birmingham Museum of Art, Birmingham, Alabama
- 2004 - Coming Home: Self-Taught Artists, the Bible, and the American South - Art Museum of the University of Memphis, Memphis, TN

=== Permanent collections ===
- National Gallery of Art, Washington, D.C.
- Metropolitan Museum of Art, New York, NY
- Smithsonian American Art Museum, Washington, D.C.
- Fine Arts Museums of San Francisco, San Francisco, CA
- High Museum of Art, Atlanta, GA
- Birmingham Museum of Art, Birmingham, AL
- Minneapolis Institute of Art

=== Selected publications ===
- Finley, Cheryl; Griffey, Randall R.; Peck, Amelia; Pinckney, Darry. My Soul Has Grown Deep: Black Art from the American South. Metropolitan Museum of Art, 2018
- Anglin Burgard, Timothy (Editor), Thornton Dial (Contributor), Lonnie Holley (Contributor), Joe Minter (Contributor), Lauren Palmor (Contributor). Revelations: Art from the African American South, Prestel, 2017
- Horace Randall Williams (Author), Karen Wilkin (Author), Sharon Holland (Author), William S. Arnett (Introduction), Bernard Herman (Contributor). History Refused to Die: The Enduring Legacy of African American Art in Alabama, Tinwood Books, 2015
- Crown, Carol, ed. Coming Home: Self-Taught Artists, the Bible, and the American South, Jackson, MS: University Press of Mississippi, 2004
- Conwill, Kinshasha; Danto, Arthur C.;Testimony: Vernacular Art of the African-American South. Harry N. Abrams, 2002
- Arnett, William and Paul Arnett, eds. Souls Grown Deep: African American Vernacular Art of the South, vol. II, Atlanta: Tinwood Books, 2001
