= Anguilla, Mississippi =

- Town
- Location within Sharkey County and Mississippi
- Coordinates: 32°58′19″N 90°49′42″W
- Country: United States
- State: Mississippi
- County: Sharkey

Area
  - Total: 1.03 sq mi (2.68 km^{2})
  - Land: 1.03 sq mi (2.68 km^{2})
  - Water: 0 sq mi (0.00 km^{2})
- Elevation: 108 ft (33 m)

Population (2020)
  - Total: 496
  - Density: 479.8/sq mi (185.26/km^{2})
- Time zone: UTC-6 (Central (CST))
  - Summer (DST): UTC-5 (CDT)
- ZIP code: 38721
- Area code: 662
- FIPS code: 28-01500
- GNIS ID: 2405153

Anguilla is a town in Sharkey County, Mississippi, United States. The population was 496 at the 2020 census, down from 726 at the 2010 census.

== History ==
The town was heavily damaged by an EF2 tornado on December 13, 2022.

== Geography ==
According to the United States Census Bureau, the town has a total area of 1.0 square mile (2.6 km^{2}), all land.

== Demographics ==
=== Racial and ethnic composition ===
Historical population
| Census | Pop. | Note | %± |
|---|---|---|---|
| 1920 | 361 | | — |
| 1930 | 467 | | 29.4% |
| 1940 | 493 | | 5.6% |
| 1950 | 601 | | 21.9% |
| 1960 | 580 | | −3.5% |
| 1970 | 612 | | 5.5% |
| 1980 | 950 | | 55.2% |
| 1990 | 883 | | −7.1% |
| 2000 | 907 | | 2.7% |
| 2010 | 726 | | −20.0% |
| 2020 | 496 | | −31.7% |
U.S. Decennial Census

Anguilla town, Mississippi – Racial and ethnic composition Note: the US Census treats Hispanic/Latino as an ethnic category. This table excludes Latinos from the racial categories and assigns them to a separate category. Hispanics/Latinos may be of any race.
| Race / Ethnicity (NH = Non-Hispanic) | Pop 2000 | Pop 2010 | Pop 2020 | % 2000 | % 2010 | % 2020 |
|---|---|---|---|---|---|---|
| White alone (NH) | 200 | 154 | 104 | 22.05% | 21.21% | 20.97% |
| Black or African American alone (NH) | 698 | 565 | 381 | 76.96% | 77.82% | 76.81% |
| Native American or Alaska Native alone (NH) | 0 | 1 | 0 | 0.00% | 0.14% | 0.00% |
| Asian alone (NH) | 5 | 1 | 5 | 0.55% | 0.14% | 1.01% |
| Native Hawaiian or Pacific Islander alone (NH) | 0 | 0 | 0 | 0.00% | 0.00% | 0.00% |
| Other race alone (NH) | 0 | 0 | 0 | 0.00% | 0.00% | 0.00% |
| Mixed race or Multiracial (NH) | 3 | 5 | 4 | 0.33% | 0.69% | 0.81% |
| Hispanic or Latino (any race) | 1 | 0 | 2 | 0.11% | 0.00% | 0.40% |
| Total | 907 | 726 | 496 | 100.00% | 100.00% | 100.00% |

=== 2020 census ===
As of the 2020 United States census, there were 496 people, 254 households, and 154 families residing in the town.

=== 2010 census ===
As of the census of 2010, there were 726 people, 266 households, and 191 families residing in the town. The population density was 868.8 inhabitants per square mile (335.4/km^{2}). There were 301 housing units at an average density of 306.5 per square mile (118.3/km^{2}). The racial makeup of the town was 77.8% African American, 21.2% White, 0.1% Asian, and 0.7% from two or more races. Hispanic or Latino of any race were 0.0% of the population.

There were 266 households, out of which 32.3% had children under the age of 18 living with them, 31.6% were married couples living together, 33.5% had a female householder with no husband present, and 28.2% were non-families. 23.3% of all households were made up of individuals, and 6.4% had someone living alone who was 65 years of age or older. The average household size was 2.73 and the average family size was 3.16.

In the town, the population was spread out, with 28.2% under the age of 18, and 10.2% who were 65 years of age or older. The median age was 33.4 years. For every 100 females, there were 92.6 males. For every 100 females age 18 and over, there were 76.8 males.

The median income for a household in the town was $19,712, and the median income for a family was $21,964. Males had a median income of $28,125 versus $15,833 for females. The per capita income for the town was $10,452. About 41.0% of families and 47.5% of the population were below the poverty line, including 66.6% of those under age 18 and 24.0% of those age 65 or over.

== Education ==
The town of Anguilla is served by the South Delta School District.

== Notable people ==
- Robert Anderson, a male singer, born in 1919.
- Antoine Cash, a former American football linebacker, born 1982.
- Ira Lee Harge, a retired American professional basketball player, born in 1942
- Joyce Kennedy, a female singer, in Anguilla 1948.
- Henry "Son" Sims, the Delta blues fiddler, who worked with Charlie Patton and Muddy Waters.
