= 1971 Mississippi Delta tornado outbreak =

Catastrophic tornado outbreak in the Mississippi Delta

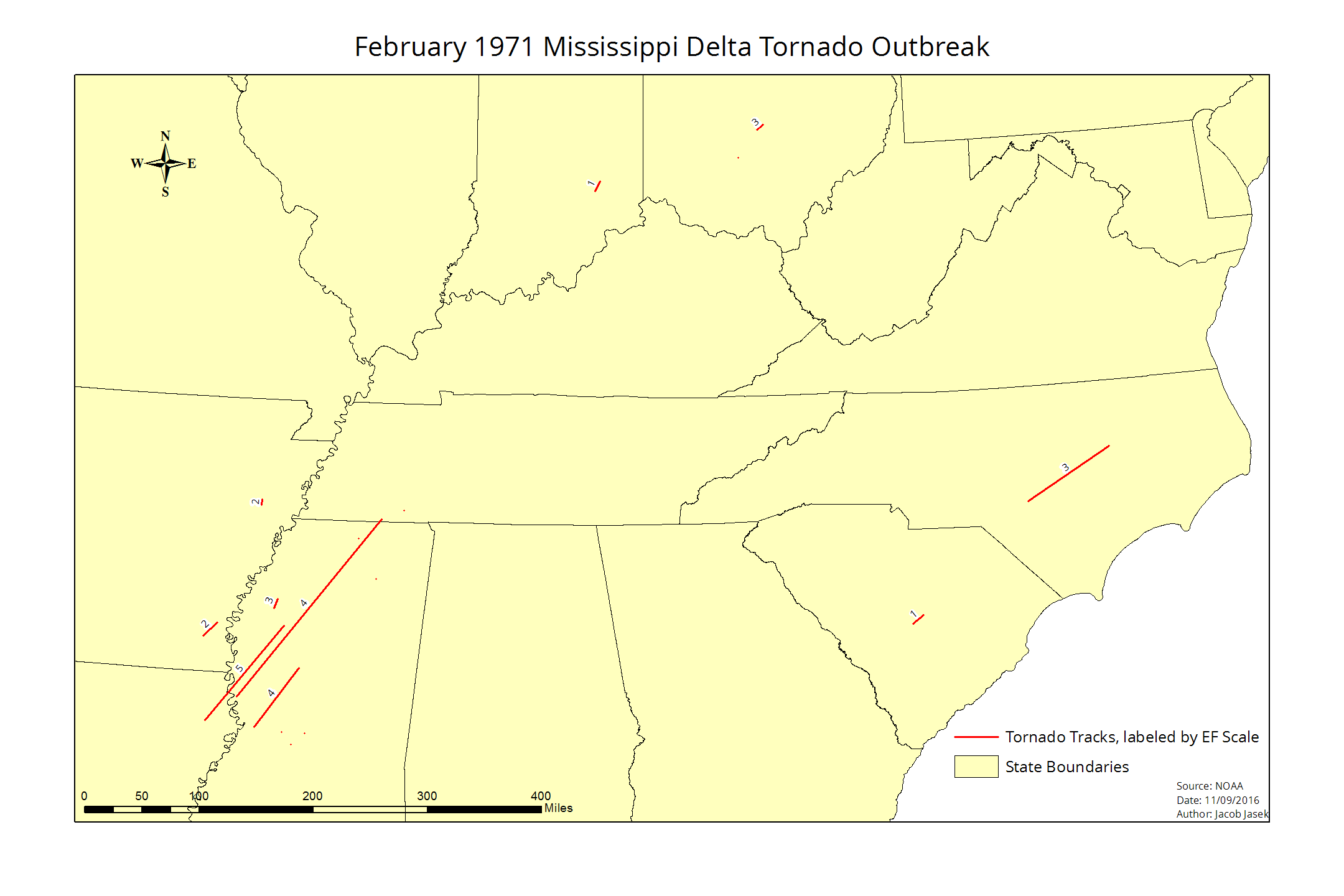
- Tornado tracks

Tornado outbreak
- Tornadoes: ≥ 26
- Max. rating: F5 tornado
- Duration: February 21–22, 1971
- Highest winds: 50 kn (58 mph; 93 km/h)
- Largest hail: 1 3/4 in (4.4 cm)

Category 5 "Extreme" blizzard
- Regional snowfall index: 19.36 (NOAA)
- Lowest pressure: 996 mbar (hPa); 29.41 inHg
- Max. snowfall: 36 inches (91 cm) in Buffalo, Oklahoma

Overall effects
- Fatalities: 123
- Injuries: 1,655
- Damage: > $22,400,150 ($178,080,000 in 2025 USD) (Note: All losses are in 1971 United States dollars unless otherwise noted.)
- Areas affected: Southern United States (primarily the Mississippi Delta), Great Lakes region
- Part of the tornado outbreaks of 1971 and 1970–71 North American winter

From Sunday to Monday, February 21–22, 1971, a devastating tornado outbreak, colloquially known as the Mississippi Delta outbreak, struck portions of the Lower Mississippi and Ohio River valleys in the Southern and Midwestern United States. The outbreak generated strong tornadoes from Texas to Ohio and North Carolina. The two-day severe weather episode produced at least 25 tornadoes, and probably several more, mostly brief events in rural areas; killed 123 people across three states; and wrecked entire communities in Mississippi. The strongest tornado of the outbreak was an F5 that developed in Louisiana and crossed into Mississippi, killing 48 people, while the deadliest was an F4 that tracked across Mississippi and entered Tennessee, causing 57 fatalities in the former state. The former remains the only F5 on record in Louisiana, while the latter is the deadliest on record in Mississippi since 1950. A deadly F4 also affected other parts of Mississippi, causing 13 more deaths. Other deadly tornadoes included a pair of F3s—one each in Mississippi and North Carolina, respectively—that collectively killed five people. (Note: An outbreak is generally defined as a group of at least six tornadoes (the number sometimes varies slightly according to local climatology) with no more than a six-hour gap between individual tornadoes. An outbreak sequence, prior to (after) the start of modern records in 1950, is defined as a period of no more than two (one) consecutive days without at least one significant (F2 or stronger) tornado.)

== Background ==
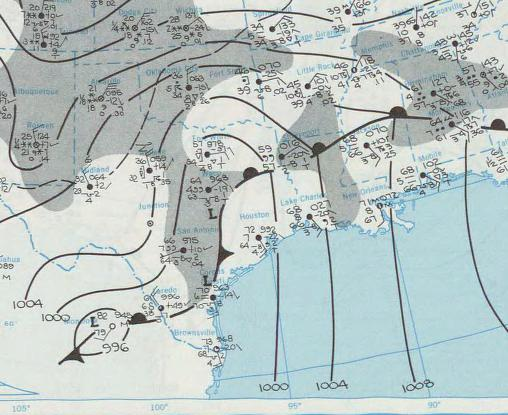
Surface weather analysis at 12:00 UTC on February 21

At 12:00 UTC on February 21, 1971, surface weather analysis failed to indicate either a well-developed low-pressure area or a defined frontal boundary over the Gulf Coastal Plain, signs that would normally presage a severe weather outbreak. At the time, a diffuse warm front extended eastward from East Texas to portions of Mississippi, and a cold front extended southward over East Texas. Higher up in the atmosphere, conditions were "close to ideal" for a significant tornado outbreak: a broad trough imparted substantial divergence over the prefrontal warm sector.

== Impact ==
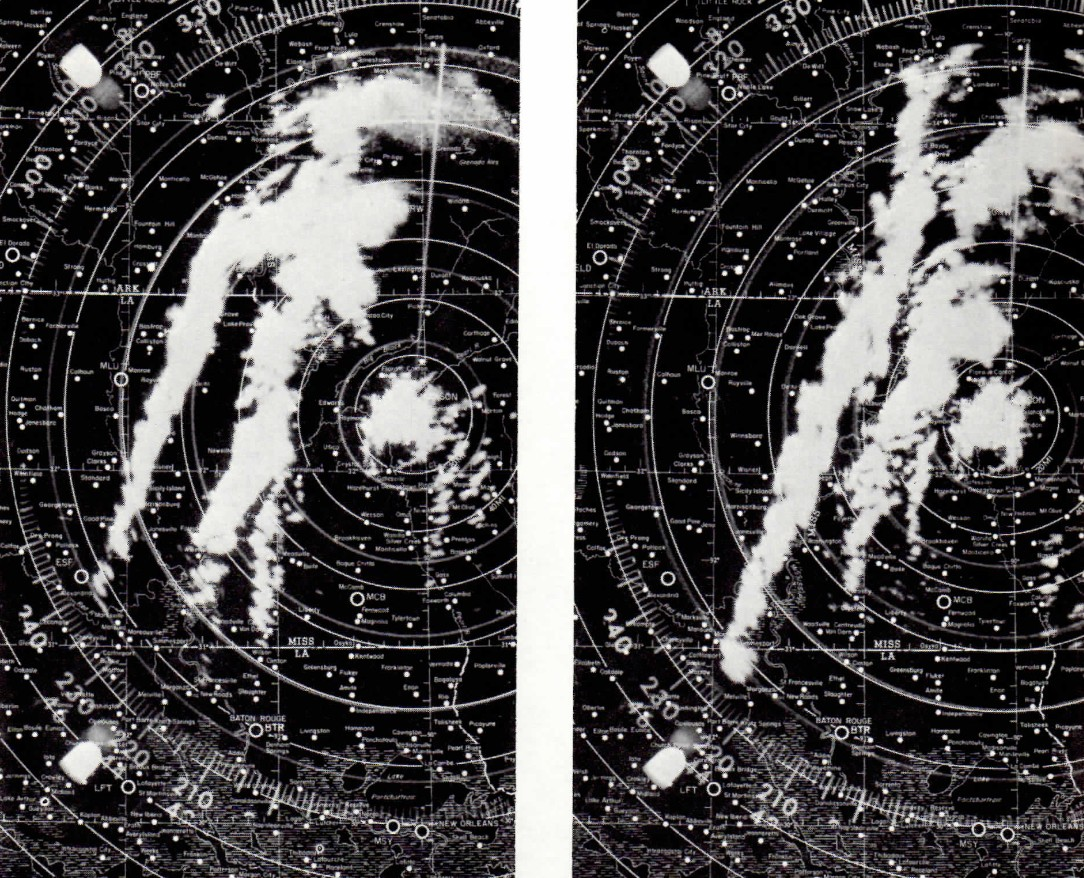
A radar image showing multiple supercells during the outbreak.

Activity started early on the morning of February 21. The first tornadoes touched down in Texas east of Austin and north of Waco. The main activity intensified during the afternoon over the Mississippi and Tennessee Valleys until the late evening. At 15:55 UTC the National Severe Storms Forecast Center (NSSFC) in Kansas City, Missouri, issued a tornado watch for eastern Arkansas, northern Mississippi, and adjoining portions of Tennessee and Alabama. A subsequent watch covered portions of eastern Louisiana and southwestern Mississippi, more than an hour before the first major tornado developed.

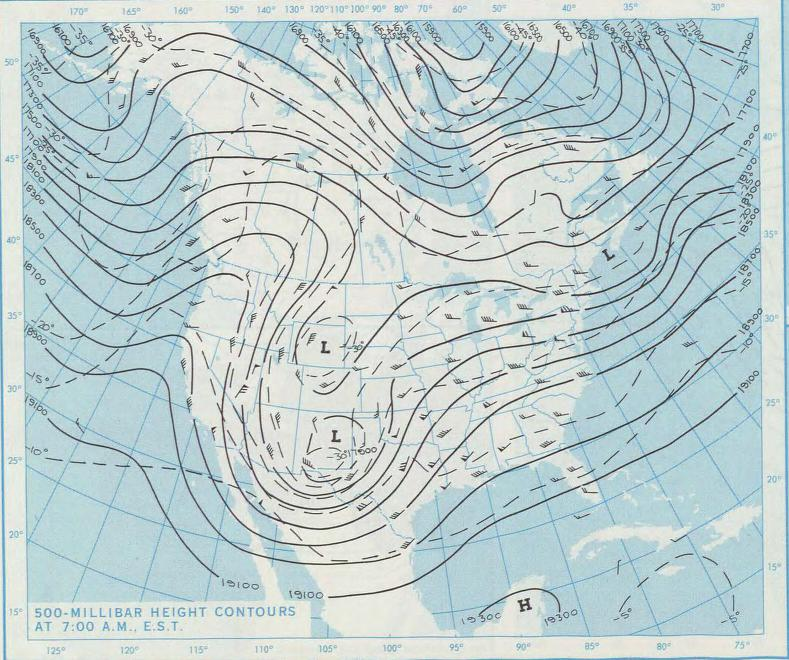
Upper-air analysis at 12:00 UTC on February 21

Three violent, long-lived tornadoes—two of which may have been tornado families—in western Mississippi and northeastern Louisiana caused most of the deaths along 330 mi (530 km) of path. The first of the three long-lived violent tornadoes was an F5 that touched down in Louisiana and traveled continuously for 102–110 mi (164–177 km), followed by an F4 in Mississippi that produced continuous damage for 114.8 mi (184.8 km). A third, F4 tornado traveled 69–72 3/4 mi (111.0–117.1 km) through Little Yazoo, Mississippi, and near Lexington. The three violent tornadoes moved at up to 55 mph (89 km/h), and eyewitnesses reported more than 50 tornadoes or funnel clouds in the Mississippi Delta region alone, many of which were sightings of the same tornado. At one point, the National Weather Service (NWS) WSR-57, a type of weather radar, in Jackson, Mississippi, reported four simultaneous hook echoes that indicated tornado-producing supercells.

Although authorities issued timely tornado warnings—with an average lead time of about an hour in the worst-hit areas—few homes in the area were well constructed, and many lacked basements or other safe areas, thus contributing to the large number of deaths. Many residents were reportedly aware of the danger but could not find shelter in time. As a result, the violent tornadoes killed entire families and caused as many as 21 deaths in some communities. Many of the dead were blacks who resided in frail structures. The entire outbreak may have killed 113–119 people and injured as many as 2,003 others. In Mississippi alone, tornadoes officially killed 110 people and injured 1,469; of these, 454 persons were hospitalized. Some sources listed 107 deaths and 1,060–1,514 injuries in Mississippi. Losses in the three states of Mississippi, Tennessee, and Louisiana totaled $19 million.

== Outbreak statistics ==
Outbreak death toll
State	Total	County	County total
Louisiana	11	Madison	11
Mississippi	110	Humphreys	32
Mississippi	110	Leflore	14
Mississippi	110	Sharkey	23
Mississippi	110	Sunflower	28
Mississippi	110	Warren	2
Mississippi	110	Yazoo	11
North Carolina	2	Cumberland	2
Totals	123		
All deaths were tornado-related

== Confirmed tornadoes ==
Confirmed tornadoes by Fujita rating
FU	F0	F1	F2	F3	F4	F5	Total
5	2	3	7	6	2	1	≥ 26*

The actual total was likely considerably higher, especially over rural areas.

- On February 21, between 15:25–15:35 UTC, a funnel cloud and possible tornado may have occurred during a severe thunderstorm at Athens, Henderson County, Texas. One resident reported a "roaring" noise like that of many freight trains, but a tornado was not believed to have developed.

Prior to 1990, there is a likely undercount of tornadoes, particularly E/F0–1, with reports of weaker tornadoes becoming more common as population increased. A sharp increase in the annual average E/F0–1 count by approximately 200 tornadoes was noted upon the implementation of NEXRAD Doppler weather radar in 1990–1991. (Note: Historically, the number of tornadoes globally and in the United States was and is likely underrepresented: research by Grazulis on annual tornado activity suggests that, as of 2001, only 53% of yearly U.S. tornadoes were officially recorded. Documentation of tornadoes outside the United States was historically less exhaustive, owing to the lack of monitors in many nations and, in some cases, to internal political controls on public information. Most countries only recorded tornadoes that produced severe damage or loss of life. Significant low biases in U.S. tornado counts likely occurred through the early 1990s, when advanced NEXRAD was first installed and the National Weather Service began comprehensively verifying tornado occurrences.) 1974 marked the first year where significant tornado (E/F2+) counts became homogenous with contemporary values, attributed to the consistent implementation of Fujita scale assessments. (Note: The Fujita scale was devised under the aegis of scientist T. Theodore Fujita in the early 1970s. Prior to the advent of the scale in 1971, tornadoes in the United States were officially unrated. Tornado ratings were retroactively applied to events prior to the formal adoption of the F-scale by the National Weather Service. While the Fujita scale has been superseded by the Enhanced Fujita scale in the U.S. since February 1, 2007, Canada used the old scale until April 1, 2013; nations elsewhere, like the United Kingdom, apply other classifications such as the TORRO scale.) Numerous discrepancies on the details of tornadoes in this outbreak exist between sources. The total count of tornadoes and ratings differs from various agencies accordingly. The list below documents information from the most contemporary official sources alongside assessments from tornado historian Thomas P. Grazulis.

Color/symbol key
Color / symbol	Description
†	Data from Grazulis 1990/1993/2001b
¶	Data from a local National Weather Service office
§	Data from the NOAA Natural Disaster Survey Report
#	Data from Tornado Talk reanalysis
※	Data from the 1971 Storm Data publication
♭	Data from the 1971 Climatological Data publication
‡	Data from the NCEI database
♯	Maximum width of tornado
±	Tornado was rated below F2 intensity by Grazulis but a specific rating is unavailable.

=== February 21 event ===
Confirmed tornadoes – Sunday, February 21, 1971 (Note: All dates are based on the local time zone where the tornado touched down; however, all times are in Coordinated Universal Time and dates are split at midnight CST/CDT for consistency.)
F#	Location	County / Parish	State	Start Coord. (Note: All starting coordinates are based on the NCEI database and may not reflect contemporary analyses)	Time (UTC)	Path length	Width (Note: The listed width values are primarily the average/mean width of the tornadoes, with those having known maximum widths denoted by ♯. From 1952 to 1994, reports largely list mean width whereas contemporary years list maximum width. Values provided by Grazulis are the average width, with estimates being rounded down (i.e. 0.5 mi (0.80 km) is rounded down from 880 yards to 800 yards.)	Damage (Note: The National Oceanic and Atmospheric Administration's Storm Data publication does not list exact damage totals for every event, instead giving damage categories. As such, damage for individual tornadoes is not comprehensive.)
F2	Downtown Bellmead※	McLennan	TX	31.62°N 97.10°W	13:30–?	0.5 mi (0.80 km)†	50 yd (46 m)†	$225,000†
F2	Brief but strong, a small tornado wrecked a trailer, unroofed a frame home, extensively damaged businesses, and tore roofing off a post office. The National Centers for Environmental Information (NCEI) Storm Events Database incorrectly lists the tornado as having hit Lacy Lakeview.							
F1	SW of Lincoln	Lee	TX	30.28°N 96.97°W	14:15–?	0.3 mi (0.48 km)‡	10 yd (9.1 m)‡	$150※
F1	A brief, narrow tornado tore off an awning and part of a steel roof, carrying them about 100 ft (33 yd). It also pulled up three awning posts and drove 2-by-4-inch (51 by 102 mm) lumber pieces into the ground, where they could not be dislodged.							
F2	S of Collins to NE of McGehee※	Drew, Desha	AR	33.45°N 91.57°W	21:00–?	17.1 mi (27.5 km)	300 yd (270 m)	#250,000‡
F2	An intermittent, low-end F2 tornado badly damaged a few homes, did lesser damage to others, and felled many trees. It also lightly damaged a municipal park.							
F5	SSE of Delhi (LA) to Inverness (MS) to S of Schlater (MS)	Madison (LA), East Carroll (LA), Issaquena (MS), Sharkey (MS), Washington (MS), Humphreys (MS), Sunflower (MS), Leflore (MS)	LA, MS	32.38°N 91.47°W	21:08–23:10	102–110 mi (164–177 km)	2,000 yd (1,800 m)♯	Unknown
F5	48 deaths – See article on this tornado – 510 people were injured.							
F4	ENE of Fitler to NE of Tillatoba#	Issaquena, Sharkey, Humphreys, Leflore, Carroll, Grenada, Tallahatchie, Yalobusha	MS	32.70°N 91.02°W	22:00–00:05#	114.8 mi (184.8 km)#	2,140 yd (1,960 m)♯	Unknown
F4	57 deaths – See section on this tornado – 795 people were injured. Grazulis listed 700 injuries.							
F3	WNW of Whitney to Parchman to NE of Rome	Sunflower	MS	33.85°N 90.52°W	22:00–22:10※	8.6 mi (13.8 km)	33 yd (30 m)	Unknown
F3	2+ deaths – A tornado destroyed several tenant homes and a cotton gin, while damaging several other homes. Grazulis ranked it F2. Both Grazulis and Storm Data only listed two deaths, but the NCEI listed three; Grazulis also noted five injuries.							
F2±	E of Colt to SE of Wynne※	St. Francis, Cross※	AR	35.15°N 90.78°W	23:00–?	4.6 mi (7.4 km)‡	100 yd (91 m)‡	$25,000‡
F2±	A tornado damaged many structures, including a few barns, a brick home, mobile homes.							
F4	SSW of Bovina※ to Little Yazoo to SW of Lexington	Warren, Yazoo, Holmes	MS	32.33°N 90.73°W	23:06–00:16	69–72.75 mi (111.04–117.08 km)	1,510 yd (1,380 m)♯	Unknown
F4	13+ deaths – See section on this tornado – 200 people were injured.							
FU§	Toccopola	Pontotoc	MS	Unknown	00:30–?	Unknown	Unknown	Unknown
FU§	Tornado damage was reported.							
F0	SSE of McRaven	Hinds	MS	32.28°N 90.32°W	00:54–00:55※	0.1 mi (0.16 km)‡	33 yd (30 m)‡	Unknown
F0	A brief touchdown produced little or no damage.							
F1	ENE of Sinai	Rankin	MS	32.13°N 90.17°W	01:10–?	0.1 mi (0.16 km)‡	33 yd (30 m)‡	Unknown
F1	With a "loud roar" a brief tornado uplifted a vehicle, crossing a road between Florence and Plain.							
FU	W of Oxford to NE of Abbeville	Lafayette	MS	Unknown	01:22–?§	≥10 mi (16 km)♭	880 yd (800 m)♭	~$500,000♭
FU	Up to three tornadoes destroyed over 31 trailers, passing near the University of Mississippi campus and through the Holly Springs National Forest.							
F0	Eastern Pearl	Rankin	MS	32.28°N 89.98°W	01:35–?	0.1 mi (0.16 km)‡	33 yd (30 m)‡	Unknown
F0	A brief tornado felled utility wires and trees at the McLaurin Shopping Center.							
F2	Hurricane※	Pontotoc	MS	34.27°N 88.98°W	02:10–?※	0.1 mi (0.16 km)‡	33 yd (30 m)‡	>$72,000※
F2	A narrow-but-strong tornado wrecked a brick school. It also damaged nearby school buildings, a church, a few stores, and power lines. Roofing and assorted debris were flung several hundred yards.							
F3†	SW of Middleton	Hardeman	TN	35.00°N 88.95°W	~02:20–?§	3.6 mi (5.8 km)	100 yd (91 m)	$40,000†
F3†	A tornado damaged three homes, one of which it destroyed. It also unroofed a 24-by-60-foot (7.3 by 18.3 m) mobile home, tore off most of its walls, and downed or splintered several large trees.							
F3†	W of Statesville to Prosperity to S of Liberty	Wilson, DeKalb	TN	Unknown	02:31–?	15 mi (24 km)	200 yd (180 m)	Unknown
F3†	An intense tornado destroyed or severely damaged 10 homes, 15 barns, and 14 other structures, along with a spacious brick church. Half a dozen cars were damaged as well, and at least one home lost its roof. 36 injuries occurred.							
F2±	SSW of Snow Lake Shores‡	Benton	MS	34.77°N 89.27°W	~02:40–?※	0.1 mi (0.16 km)‡	33 yd (30 m)‡	Unknown
F2±	A tornado hit the Woburn community, between Ashland and Holly Springs, downing trees and power lines. Linked to the Cary–Pugh City family, it probably was tied to a separate storm, based on an hour-long gap between tornadoes in a 2-mile (3.2 km) span.							
FU	SW of Bethlehem	Marshall	MS	Unknown	~02:40–?§	Unknown	Unknown	Unknown
FU	A tornado was reported.							
FU	Oakland	Tippah	MS	Unknown	03:05–?§	Unknown	Unknown	Unknown
FU	A tornado was reported.							
F3†	Southeastern Selmer	McNairy	TN	35.15°N 88.58°W	03:35–?	1.5 mi (2.4 km)	67 yd (61 m)	$1,000,000†
F3†	A tornado destroyed or damaged about 40 homes and 15 businesses. It injured 36 people, half a dozen critically.							

=== February 22 event ===
Confirmed tornadoes – Monday, February 22, 1971
F#	Location	County / Parish	State	Start Coord.	Time (UTC)	Path length	Width	Damage
F1	WSW of Letts Corner to WNW of Greensburg	Decatur	IN	39.23°N 85.60°W	18:00–18:10※	9.1 mi (14.6 km)‡	80 yd (73 m)‡	$50,000※
F1	A tornado damaged a garage, the upper part of a house, and a pair of barns. An airplane was overturned as well. Two people were injured.							
F2†	S of Riley to ENE of Wiles Crossroads	Calhoun	SC	33.62°N 80.80°W	21:20–21:45※	11.9 mi (19.2 km)	80 yd (73 m)	$25,000‡
F2†	This tornado passed near St. Matthews, unroofing a pair of small homes and a factory.							
F2±	ESE of Pancoastburg	Fayette, Pickaway	OH	39.62°N 83.25°W	21:25–?	2 mi (3.2 km)‡	100 yd (91 m)‡	$25,000‡
F2±	A tornado damaged farm outbuildings near Deer Creek.							
F3	Northern Bexley to NW of Havens Corner	Franklin	OH	39.97°N 82.93°W	21:55–?	9 mi (14 km)†	100 yd (91 m)	$2,800,000※
F3	A near-continuous tornado moved through eastern Columbus, wrecking homes and warehouses. It also unroofed other structures and injured seven people. Grazulis ranked it F2.							
F3	Northwestern Fayetteville to Wade to Falcon	Cumberland	NC	35.08°N 78.92°W	22:30–?	20 mi (32 km)†	500 yd (460 m)	Unknown
F3	2 deaths – A tornado destroyed 40 homes—some of which incurred borderline-F4 damage, with only innermost walls left intact—and damaged another 325. Grazulis and Storm Data listed 64 injuries, but the NCEI noted 60.							
FU	N of Cooper to SSW of Sharp Point	Sampson, Duplin, Edgecombe, Pitt	NC	35.17°N 78.65°W	22:45‡–02:00※	69.6 mi (112.0 km)‡	300 yd (270 m)‡	Unknown
FU	Related to the Fayetteville F3, this event may have involved several distinct, brief tornadoes of weaker intensity.							

=== Delhi, Louisiana/Inverness, Mississippi ===
Delhi, Louisiana/Inverness, Mississippi
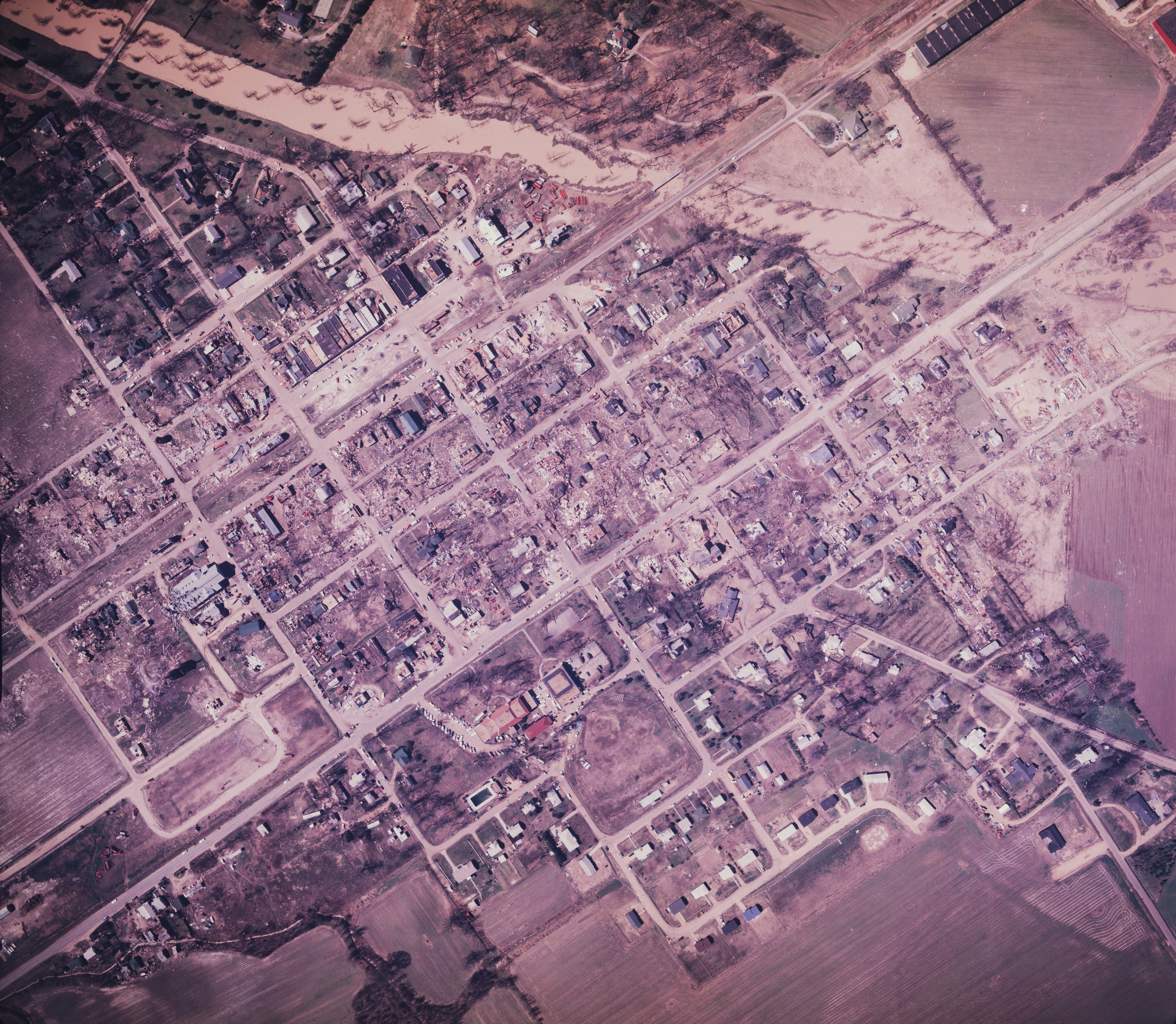
- An aerial view of Inverness, Mississippi 2 days after the tornado. 19 people were killed here.

Meteorological history
- Formed: February 21, 1971, 3:08 p.m. CST (UTC−06:00)
- Dissipated: February 21, 1971, 5:10 p.m. CDT (UTC−06:00)
- Duration: 2 hours, 2 minutes

F5 tornado
- on the Fujita scale
- Highest winds: 275 mph (443 km/h)

Overall effects
- Fatalities: 48
- Injuries: 510

This devastating, long-lived tornado was of F5 intensity in Louisiana and F4 in Mississippi. It first appeared aloft northwest of Crowville, Louisiana, at 2:50 p.m. CST (20:50 UTC) before finally touching down south-southeast of Delhi. Shortly after developing, the tornado moved northeastward at an average speed of 52 mph (84 km/h), striking the small community of Waverly. Along and northeast of U.S. Route 80, the tornado completely leveled a number of small homes at F5 intensity, though these may not have been well constructed. About 3 mi (4.8 km) east of Delhi, on a farmstead at Joes Bayou, it killed 10 people in a family of 12, five of whose bodies were thrown into nearby swamps and not located for weeks. It also destroyed a rural church, three nearby homes, and half a dozen large, overhead power lines, while downing trees. Afterward it mostly hit woods and farms for the rest of its trek in Louisiana, continuing northeastward. It struck the Melbourne settlement on Pecan Road, a short distance south of Transylvania, near Alsatia. At Melbourne the tornado destroyed a pair of mobile homes and seven homes. 13 other mobile homes, 11 outbuildings, and a mature pecan grove were severely damaged as well. Vehicles and agricultural implements were tossed about, but only minor injuries occurred. In all, the tornado killed 11 people and injured 18 others in Louisiana, though some sources do not list the eleventh fatality. After striking Melbourne, the tornado crossed the Mississippi River and entered Mississippi.

Once in Mississippi, the tornado passed near Mayersville in Issaquena County. As it did so, it began to slowly weaken in intensity, but restrengthened in Sharkey County and retained force hereafter. It killed two people near Cameta and destroyed a cotton gin near Nitta Yuma. It then devastated Delta City, killing eight people and destroying the entire community. At Delta City it destroyed 31 houses and most businesses, some of which it swept away. Continuing northeastward, it leveled farms and claimed four additional lives, including a few at Mound Lake Plantation, west of Isola. Afterward, it entered the town of Inverness as a large tornado, destroying an estimated 80–90% of the community, killing 21 people, and injuring 200 more. In town the tornado destroyed 125–153 homes, along with 40 other structures. 52 homes were badly damaged as well, 61 businesses were destroyed or damaged, and 30 outbuildings were destroyed on farms. The tornado destroyed the entire central business district, city hall, an elementary school, and the three largest churches. According to media, it also "obliterated" blocks of frail homes in the southwestern section of town, most of whose denizens were African Americans. Hundreds of people were left homeless, and railcars were tipped onto their sides. The tornado then leveled the northwestern side of Moorhead, killing four people there before ending near Schlater. In all, the tornado destroyed hundreds of homes along its path.

It is the only official F5/EF5 to have hit Louisiana since records began in 1950, the only F5/EF5 tornado to occur in the month of February, and the deadliest F5 tornado since March 3, 1966 (58 dead), though this was later eclipsed by an EF5 tornado on April 27, 2011, that killed 72 people. In 1984 and 1993 tornado researcher Grazulis rated it F4, but in 2001 accepted the official F5 rating; he also listed it as a tornado family, but a later study of aerial imagery revealed a continuous 104-mile (167 km) path. Estimates of the path length vary from 102 to 110 mi (164 to 177 km). Grazulis also found 400 injuries, while the NCEI tallied 510.

=== Cary–Pugh City, Mississippi ===
Cary–Pugh City, Mississippi
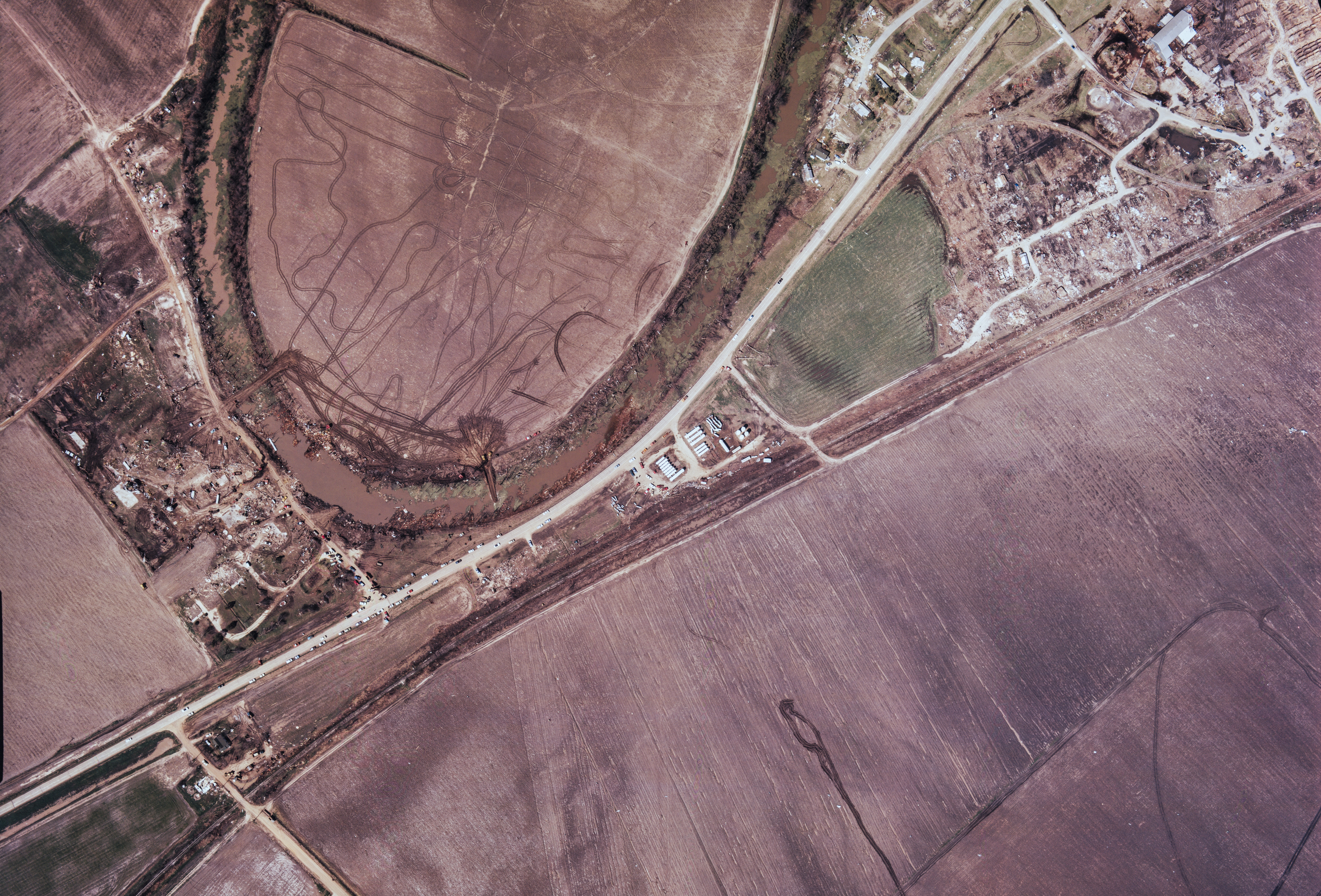
- An aerial view of Evanna Plantation and southern Cary, Mississippi 2 days after the tornado. 27 people were killed in this area.

Meteorological history
- Formed: February 21, 1971, 4:00 p.m. CST (UTC−06:00)
- Dissipated: February 21, 1971, 6:05 p.m. CST (UTC−06:00)
- Duration: 2 hours and 5 minutes

F4 tornado
- on the Fujita scale
- Highest winds: 245 mph (394 km/h)

Overall effects
- Fatalities: 57
- Injuries: 795

This tornado, was the deadliest and longest-lived of the three violent tornadoes, but it was likely a tornado family. It first touched down just east-northeast of Fitler, approximately 6–8 mi (9.7–12.9 km) southwest of Cary, and moved northeastward. Just south of Cary, the tornado destroyed the Evanna Plantation, killing 14 people there, hurling vehicles several hundred yards, scouring earth, and debarking trees. The tornado then struck southern Cary, leveling Bellgrade Quarter—a predominantly working-class, African-American neighborhood—and killing 13. Continuing to the northeast, the tornado struck Gooden Lake, killing seven people and wrecking 12 homes there. Near Belzoni it hit the Castleman community, leveling a manor there, and destroyed a few dwellings in northeastern Humphreys County. According to reports, the tornado then destroyed the Joe Regh Plantation at Pugh City, reducing frail, low-income, frame housing to "splinters", rolling farm machinery, and killing at least 21—and possibly up to 26—people; extensive wind-rowing occurred as well. The tornado left most of the 50 homes and several stores at Pugh City irreparable.

It then brushed southeastern Swiftown, destroying three homes, damaging other buildings, and killing two more people. Between Swiftown and Morgan City the tornado followed MS 7, tearing apart 35 dwellings. It then hit northwestern Morgan City, destroying about 12 homes and killing three (possibly six) people. Just west of Greenwood, near Fort Loring, it tossed a vehicle off U.S. 82, killing its two occupants. Four more deaths occurred near Money. The tornado may have weakened and reformed into a separate event that passed through or near Avalon, Oxberry, Cascilla, and Tillatoba, causing scattered damage in those communities. Isolated stands of mature trees and willows were twisted, splintered, or prostrated, and outbuildings on farms were damaged. Bits of roofing, insulation, and wallpaper were torn off in Tillatoba. This and the previous tornado closely paralleled each other, affecting several of the same counties. The tornado is the deadliest in Mississippi since 1950; however, the deadliest Mississippi tornado on record in the 20th century killed 216 people in 1936. Official data and Grazulis tabulated 58 deaths, but one of these was from the Inverness F5.

=== Little Yazoo, Mississippi ===
Little Yazoo, Mississippi
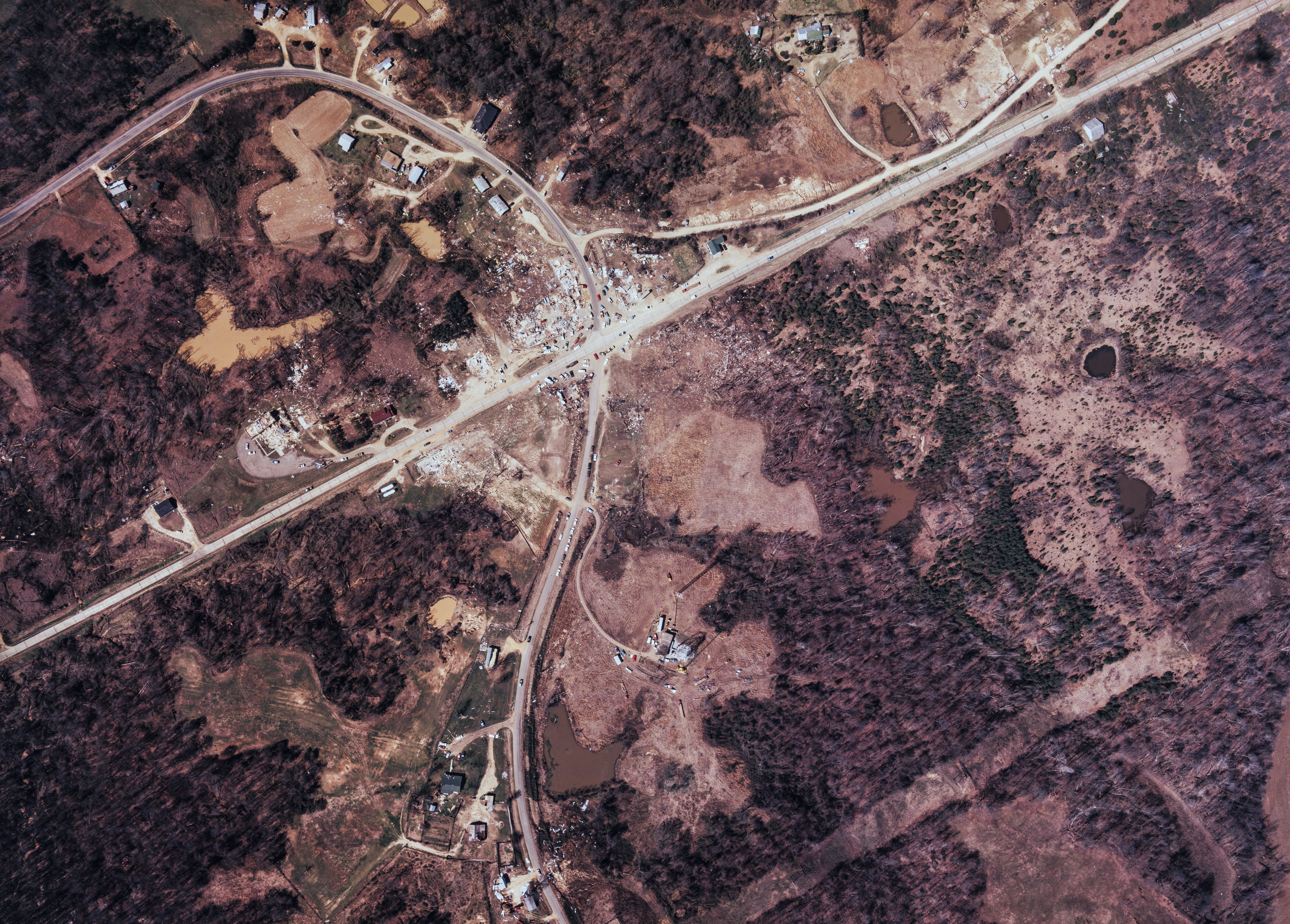
- An aerial of Little Yazoo, Mississippi 2 days after the tornado. 4 people were killed here.

Meteorological history
- Formed: February 21, 1971, 5:06 p.m. CST (UTC−06:00)
- Dissipated: February 21, 1971, 6:16 p.m. CST (UTC−06:00)
- Duration: 1 hour and 10 minutes

F4 tornado
- on the Fujita scale
- Highest winds: 225 mph (362 km/h)

Overall effects
- Fatalities: 13+
- Injuries: 200

The final long-lived violent tornado of the outbreak destroyed barns and homes, including a guest house, near Bovina, as well as approximately 100 pecan trees. One home was obliterated, with only concrete blocks remaining on its foundation, and two people died of injuries. Afterward the tornado spent many miles over wooded areas. It then crossed I-20, destroying four chicken coops, a church, and three homes. Next, it passed through and destroyed Little Yazoo, where many homes, businesses, and a church were leveled and swept away, resulting in four fatalities. Beyond Little Yazoo, near Bentonia, it killed half a dozen more and destroyed additional homes. In all, in the Little Yazoo–Bentonia area it leveled 12 homes. It damaged or destroyed 72 homes in the Yazoo County communities of Midway, Benton, and Roadside. In Holmes County, it struck the community of Brozville, extensively damaging homes, barns, chicken coops, and sheds. It finally dissipated near Lexington. In all, it leveled many homes along the path. The NCEI counted 182 injuries, while Grazulis found 200. Estimates of the path length vary from 69–72 3/4 mi (111.0–117.1 km). Up to a few more deaths may have occurred as well.

== Other effects ==
The outbreak generated severe thunderstorm winds, from Texas to Kentucky and North Carolina; winds peaked at 50 kn (58 mph; 93 km/h) in Tuscaloosa County, Alabama, on February 21. These strong winds damaged utility lines, vegetation, agricultural outbuildings, warehouses, porches, mobile homes, and barns. At least one built-up roof was partly torn off, along with tar paper. On February 21 at Athens, Henderson County, Texas, vigorous winds caused minor injuries to seven people, all of which took place in trailers. Roofing, a drive-in theater screen, and up to 500 television antennae were downed or otherwise damaged. Hail of up to 1 3/4 in (4.4 cm) in diameter was reported in Alabama and Ohio as well, including golfball-sized stones in Cambridge and Toledo, Ohio. The publication Storm Data noted that the hail in Ohio peaked at 1 in (2.5 cm) diameter.

== Aftermath, recovery, and records ==
An internal assessment by the Mississippi Power and Light Company determined that its infrastructure incurred the greatest wind-related damage in the company's history. Roughly half of its transmission towers were damaged in both Sharkey and Humphreys counties. The entire outbreak is the second-deadliest ever in February, behind only the Enigma tornado outbreak in 1884 and ahead of the 2008 Super Tuesday tornado outbreak. February 21 was the fourth-deadliest day for tornadoes in Mississippi on record.

== See also ==
- List of North American tornadoes and tornado outbreaks
- List of F5 and EF5 tornadoes
- Tornado outbreak of March 24–27, 2023 – Similar deadly tornado outbreak in the Mississippi Delta
  - 2023 Rolling Fork–Silver City tornado – Crossed the same areas as the Inverness and Cary tornadoes

== Sources ==
- Agee, Ernest M.; Childs, Samuel (June 1, 2014). "Adjustments in Tornado Counts, F-Scale Intensity, and Path Width for Assessing Significant Tornado Destruction". Journal of Applied Meteorology and Climatology. 53 (6). American Meteorological Society: 1494–1505. doi:10.1175/JAMC-D-13-0235.1.
- Brooks, Harold E. (April 2004). "On the Relationship of Tornado Path Length and Width to Intensity". Weather and Forecasting. 19 (2): 310–19. Bibcode:2004WtFor..19..310B. doi:10.1175/1520-0434(2004)019<0310:OTROTP>2.0.CO;2.
- Cook, A. R.; Schaefer, J. T. (August 2008). "The Relation of El Niño–Southern Oscillation (ENSO) to Winter Tornado Outbreaks". Monthly Weather Review. 136 (8): 3121–3137. Bibcode:2008MWRv..136.3121C. doi:10.1175/2007MWR2171.1.
- Edwards, Roger; LaDue, James G.; Ferree, John T.; Scharfenberg, Kevin; Maier, Chris; Coulbourne, William L. (May 1, 2013). "Tornado Intensity Estimation: Past, Present, and Future". Bulletin of the American Meteorological Society. 94 (5). American Meteorological Society: 641–653. doi:10.1175/BAMS-D-11-00006.1.
- Grazulis, Thomas P. (May 1984). Violent Tornado Climatography, 1880–1982. OSTI (Technical report). NUREG. Washington, D.C.: Nuclear Regulatory Commission. OSTI 7099491. CR-3670.
- Grazulis, Thomas P. (November 1990). Significant Tornadoes 1880–1989. Vol. 2. St. Johnsbury, Vermont: The Tornado Project of Environmental Films. ISBN 1-879362-02-3.
- Grazulis, Thomas P. (July 1993). Significant Tornadoes 1680–1991: A Chronology and Analysis of Events. St. Johnsbury, Vermont: The Tornado Project of Environmental Films. ISBN 1-879362-03-1.
- Grazulis, Thomas P. (2001a). The Tornado: Nature's Ultimate Windstorm. Norman, Oklahoma: University of Oklahoma Press. ISBN 978-0-8061-3538-0.
- Grazulis, Thomas P. (2001b). F5-F6 Tornadoes. St. Johnsbury, Vermont: The Tornado Project of Environmental Films.
- Mississippi Delta Tornadoes of February 21, 1971 (PDF) (Technical report). Natural Disaster Survey Report. Rockville, Maryland: United States Department of Commerce. July 1971. 71-2, A Report to the Administrator.
- Neal, Lott; Sam McCown; Tom Ross (August 2000) [1999]. 1998-1999 Tornadoes and a Long-Term U.S. Tornado Climatology (PDF) (Technical report). National Climatic Data Center Technical Report. Asheville, North Carolina: National Climatic Data Center. 99-02.
- National Weather Service (February 1971). "Storm Data and Unusual Weather Phenomena". Storm Data. 13 (2). Asheville, North Carolina: National Climatic Data Center.
- National Weather Service (February 1971). Storm Data Publication (Report). National Centers for Environmental Information – via Storm Events Database.
- National Weather Service; Saltsman, E. J. (February 1971). "Special Weather Summary". Mississippi section. Climatological Data. 76 (2). Asheville, North Carolina: United States Department of Commerce: 15–8.
- Super Tuesday Tornado Outbreak of February 5-6, 2008 (PDF) (Technical report). Service Assessment. Silver Spring, Maryland: United States Department of Commerce. March 2009. Archived from the original (PDF) on December 4, 2010.
