= 1971 Inverness tornado =

1971 tornado across the Mississippi Delta

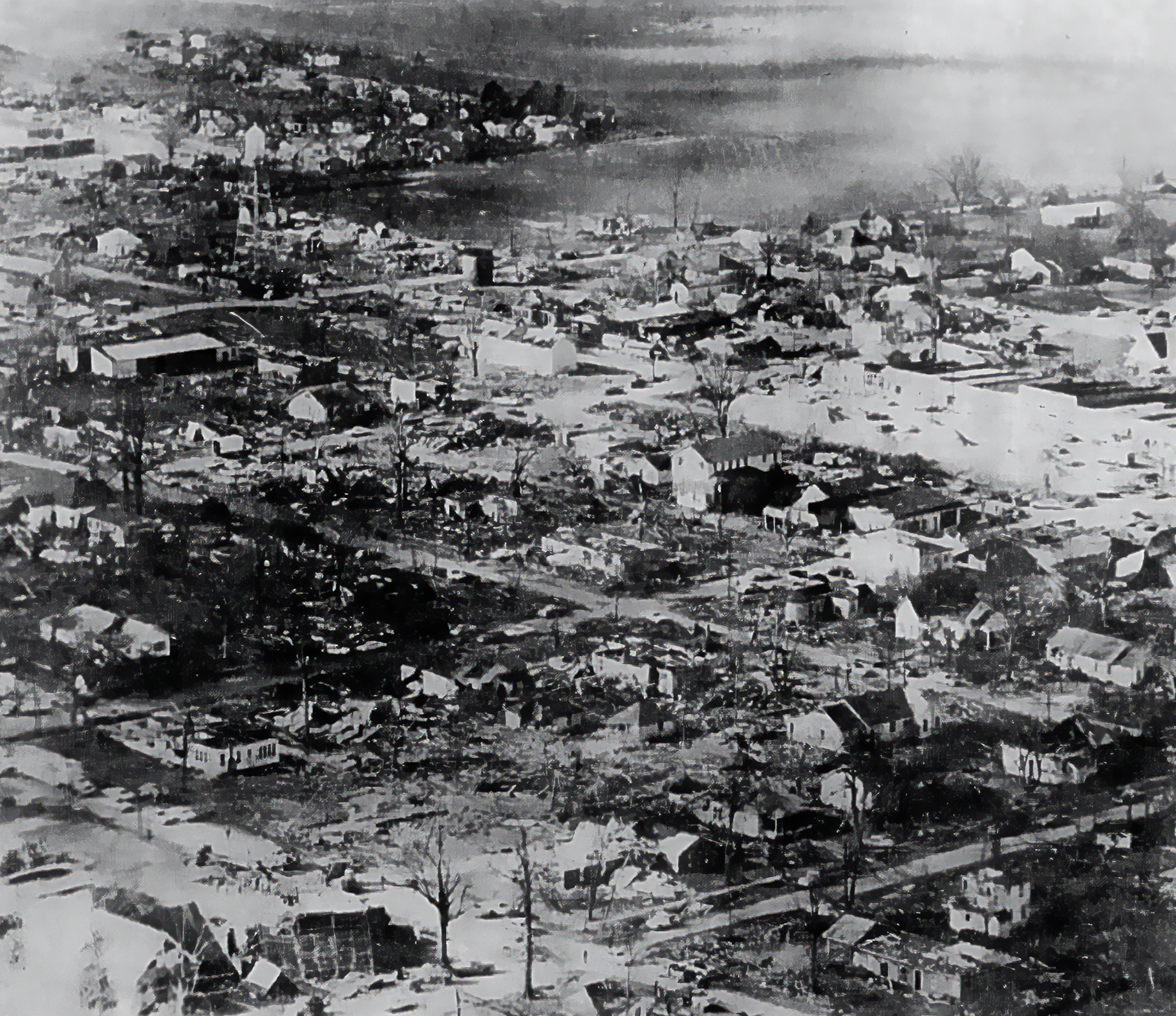
- Aerial of Inverness, MS after the tornado.

Meteorological history
- Formed: Feb 21, 1971, 3:08 p.m. CDT (UTC−05:00)
- Dissipated: Feb 21, 1971, 5:10 pm. CDT (UTC−05:00)
- Duration: 2 hours, 2 minutes

F5 tornado
- on the Fujita scale
- Highest winds: 275 mph (443 km/h)

Overall effects
- Fatalities: 48
- Injuries: 510
- Part of the Tornado outbreak of February 21–22, 1971 and Tornadoes of 1971

On the afternoon of Sunday, February 21, 1971, a deadly and long-tracked F5 tornado impacted the Mississippi Delta, killing 48 and injuring over 500. The tornado was the strongest tornado of the 1971 Mississippi Delta tornado outbreak, and second deadliest behind a later F4 tornado the same day. The tornado is most notable for tracking directly through Inverness, Mississippi, destroying over 90% of the town. The tornado is the first and only official F5/EF5 tornado to impact the state of Louisiana since reliable records began in 1950.

== Meteorological synopsis ==
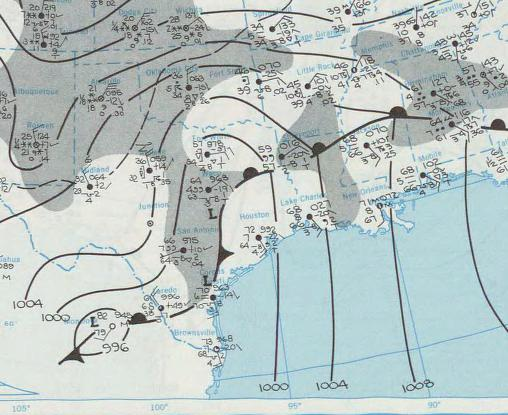
Surface weather analysis over the Gulf Coastal Plain by 12:00 UTC.

Multiple days before the event, upper-level analysis displayed conditions that were "close to ideal" for a significant tornado outbreak. A large upper-level trough situated across the Rockies, with a substantial eastward motion toward the Great Plains, leading to significant divergence over the prefrontal warm sector. This divergence caused a significant lifting mechanism that storms could take advantage of, but surface-based shortwave meteorology was still very new, and subsequently, it was unknown how the system would behave further in the week.

On February 21, 1971, a procedural surface weather analysis failed to indicate either a well-developed low-pressure area, or a defined frontal boundary near the Mississippi Delta region; signs that would normally indicate a severe weather outbreak. At the time, an amorphous warm front extended eastward from East Texas to portions of Mississippi, and a relating cold front extended southward over east Texas. Temperatures across the region rose to 60–70 F, with signs of significant instability and dew points.

By 3:00 AM CDT, the NSSFC released a severe weather outlook. The outlook stated that "a few severe thunderstorms were expected" during the afternoon across eastern Texas to western Alabama. Again at 9:00AM CDT, a severe weather outlook was released further establishing the possibility of severe thunderstorms around Texas, Louisiana, Arkansas, Mississippi, Tennessee, and Alabama.

== Tornado summary ==
=== Formation ===
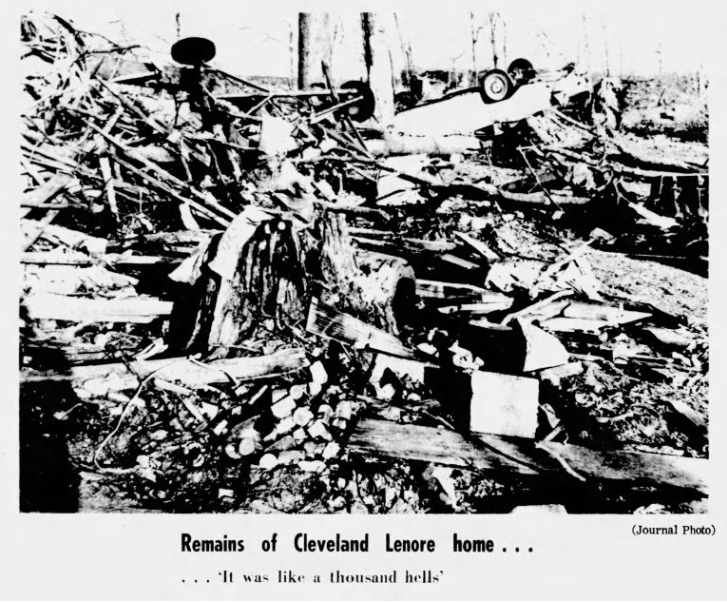
Significant damage to a home in Delhi, LA

The tornado touched down roughly 3 miles southeast of Delhi, LA at 3:08 PM CDT. Tracking northeast, in minutes the tornado widened and strengthened. Trees along Cow Bayou Rd were snapped and destroyed, and the tornado had likely grown hundreds of yards wide. The tornado was most likely moving at over 50 mph as it approached Highway 80 from the south flattening swaths of trees, and witnesses described it as looking like "a thousand hells." A farmstead on Cornist Rd was completely destroyed, and multiple vehicles at the property were mangled. 11 residents, many of whom were children, were thrown into a nearby bayou and killed. As the tornado continued, a large church to the northeast was flattened, and a steel transmission tower was crumpled to the ground before the vortex tracked through miles of forest, impacting multiple small farms and homes north of Waverly, LA.

=== Transylvania–Isola ===
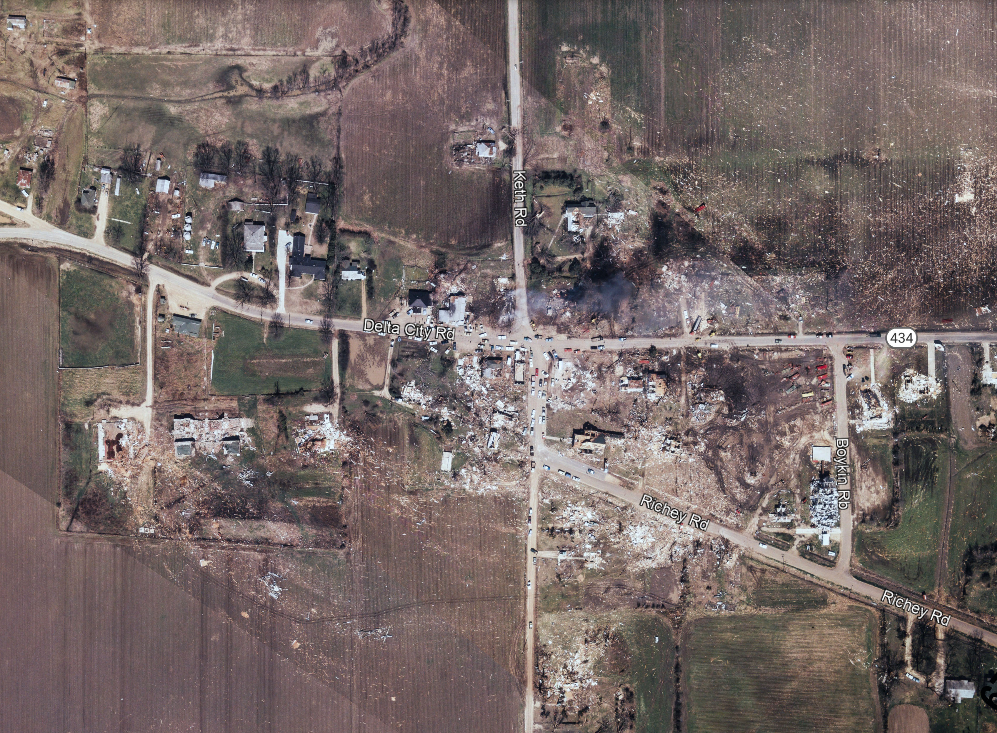
F5 damage to the center of Delta City, MS

Approaching the community of Transylvania, LA, the powerful tornado continued to expand. Homes near Dawson Rd lost roofs and exterior walls, and one home was destroyed. The worst damage in Louisiana would occur near Pecan Rd, as multiple brick homes were severely damaged or destroyed, and several manufactured homes were shifted off their foundations. Northeast towards Highway 65, vehicles driving across the highway were caught in the circulation, and a home was partially destroyed. No one in Transylvania died, however several were significantly injured. From here the tornado crossed the Mississippi River, clearing large swaths of trees in the process, it entered Mississippi at roughly 3:40 PM CDT, crossing to the north of Fitler, MS and crossing Highway 1. Five homes along the highway were completely destroyed, including a large plantation. Further into Mississippi, the tornado's wind field reached a width of 2,000 yards, snapping trees and destroying or damaging dozens of rural homes in Issaquena County. More miles of forest were shredded as the tornado continued, passing 3 miles to the west of Rolling Fork, MS across the Issaquena-Sharkey County border. Near Highway 14, a mobile home was obliterated, killing a woman, and a plantation was damaged. The core of the tornado was now producing significant ground scouring to fields, and impacted trees were obliterated, and partially debarked. The tornado tracked another 10 miles to the northeast towards Highway 61, destroying more homes, most of which were trailers or manufactured homes. As the tornado crossed Highway 61, the large Cameta Plantation was directly impacted as well as multiple shops, homes, and metal buildings nearby. Every structure near the highway was completely obliterated, with most of the plantation completely swept away and granulated by the strong winds. Trees were now severely debarked and reduced to stubs along the highway as well. At least 3 people were killed here, and evidence of intense sub-vortices manifested in intense strips of ground scouring around the main vortex. More homes were swept away as the tornado continued across Deer Creek and further into rural Sharkey County. A large storage tank was lofted over 1,000 yards from its location, and trees were again debarked and turned to stubs. The small community of Delta City was now in the direct path. Clusters of farmsteads and homes were destroyed southwest of Delta City, before the tornado would make a direct impact on the village at 4:10 PM CDT. Dozens of homes were swept and granulated from their foundations. Numerous locations, including a large school, multiple stores, the local post office and funeral home, multiple farms, and large industrial buildings were also swept away or flattened. Debris from Delta City was significantly windrowed northeast into fields, and a large church near the edge of Delta City was flattened as well. Cars were lofted and mangled, and multiple people died.

More extreme damage was documented northeast of Delta City. Trees were debarked in swaths and ground scouring was observed in fields. A two-story home was completely flattened as the tornado entered Washington County. In Washington County, scattered damage was inflicted on any residence or farmstead in the general path. Far western portions of the Isola community were damaged as the tornado now threatened the heavily populated town of Inverness.

=== Inverness ===
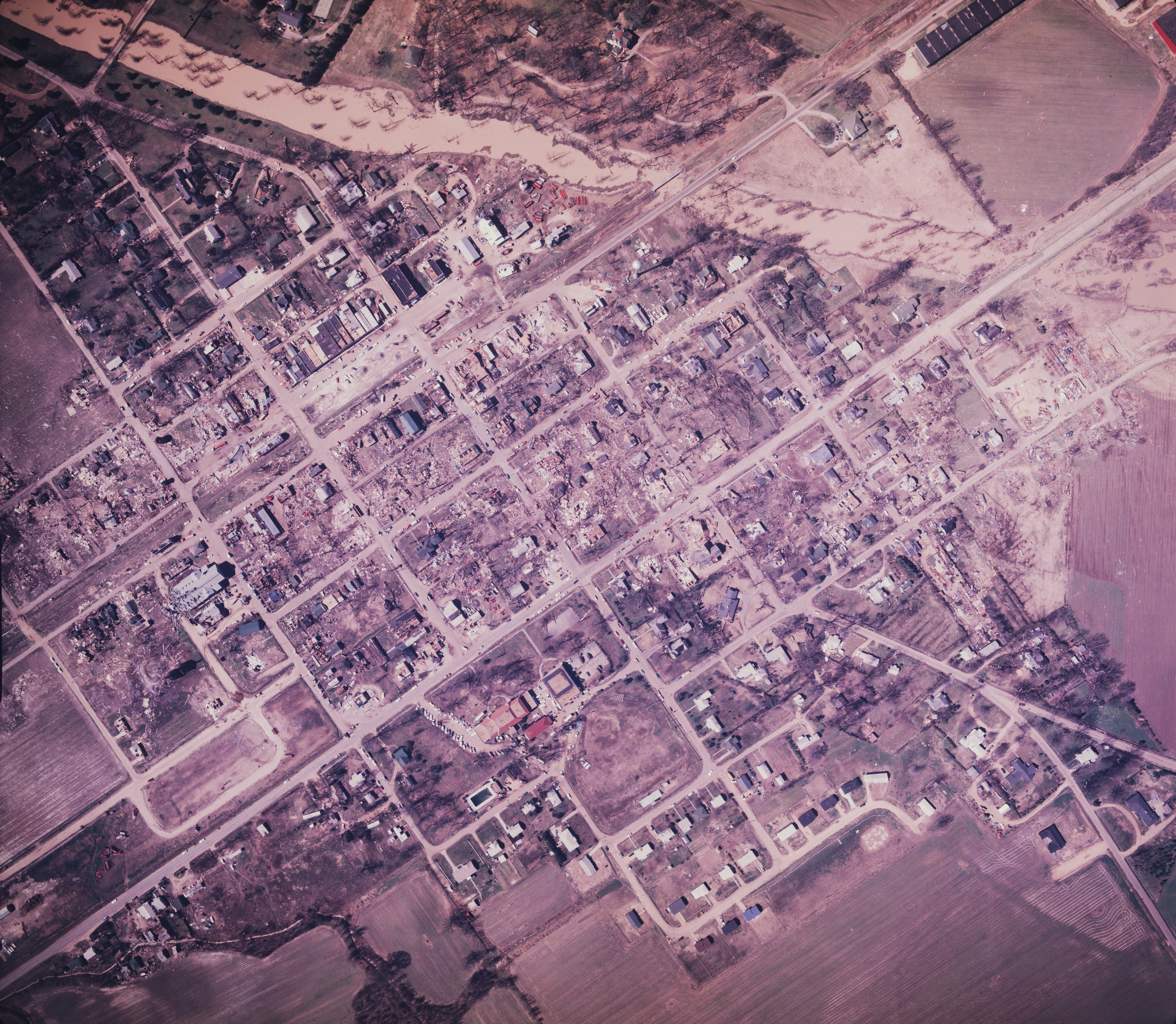
Aerial imagery showing extreme damage to downtown Inverness, MS

As the tornado entered the town of Inverness, complete devastation began. Virtually the entire town was obliterated, including extreme damage to the local elementary school and the town's cotton gin. Dozens died as their homes were shredded, and cars were mangled with some never located. The city hall, local bank, post office, and more were also destroyed. Despite significant warning given by the National Weather Service, the community was predominantly low-income, and structures were poorly constructed, leading to increased fatalities. The tornado then crossed through 4th Street into the heart of downtown Inverness, where more businesses were destroyed, including several important government buildings and economic sources. Ground scouring and extreme tree debarking was observed throughout the town as well.

Past downtown, larger homes in the "white" neighborhoods of Inverness were damaged. Two churches lost roofing and walls, cars were tossed into trees, and farm equipment was mangled as the tornado finally exited Inverness. The tornado caused 19 deaths in Inverness, and hundreds of injuries.

=== Moorhead–Dissipation ===
Exiting Inverness, spaced out residences along Mound Bayou were significantly damaged or destroyed, and ground scouring and wind-rowing of debris was observed once again. The vortex began to weaken slightly as it maintained itself through open farmland and forest, snapping trees and damaging a couple of structures. After tracking near Highway 3 for multiple miles, the town of Moorhead became situated in the direct path.

The tornado entered Moorhead, and while the size was significant, the strength of the tornado had drastically weakened. Homes near the western fringes of Moorhead saw minor roof damage and mobile homes were damaged or flipped. Poorly anchored structures suffered wall collapses as the tornado tracked through town, but damage remained minimal. Despite the weakening, multiple lives were lost in Moorhead. Exiting Moorhead, the tornado rapidly weakened, and quickly dissipated just outside the town.

== Impact and casualties ==
In the direct aftermath of the tornado, multiple towns came together to assist in search and rescue, and quickly rebuilding of towns such as Inverness began. Smaller towns however, such as Delta City suffered damage that to this day has not been recovered from, and was predicted by residents whom had "little hope in recovering". The area of Nitta Yuma. which was home to the Cameta Plantation now only contains a handful of structures, far from how it was before the tornado. The Inverness tornado tracked over 100 miles from Louisiana to Mississippi causing 48 deaths and over 500 injuries. A majority of the destruction occurred to low-income predominately African American residences and families, contributing to the impact. While official sources list the tornado as around 500-600 yards, re-analysis through aerial survey has found upwards of 2,000 yards in width.

== See also ==
- List of North American tornadoes and tornado outbreaks
- 2023 Rolling Fork–Silver City tornado - another deadly tornado that affected areas near this tornado

== Notes ==
=== References ===
- Mississippi Delta Tornadoes of February 21, 1971 (PDF) (Technical report). Natural Disaster Survey Report. Rockville, Maryland: United States Department of Commerce. July 1971. 71-2, A Report to the Administrator.
- National Weather Service; Saltsman, E. J. (February 1971). "Special Weather Summary". Mississippi section. Climatological Data. 76 (2). Asheville, North Carolina: United States Department of Commerce: 15–8.

Preceded by 1966 Candlestick Park tornado outbreak (1966)	Deadliest F5 tornadoes on Record; Feb 21, 1971	Succeeded by 2011 Hackleburg–Phil Campbell tornado (2011)
