= Tornadoes of 1971 =

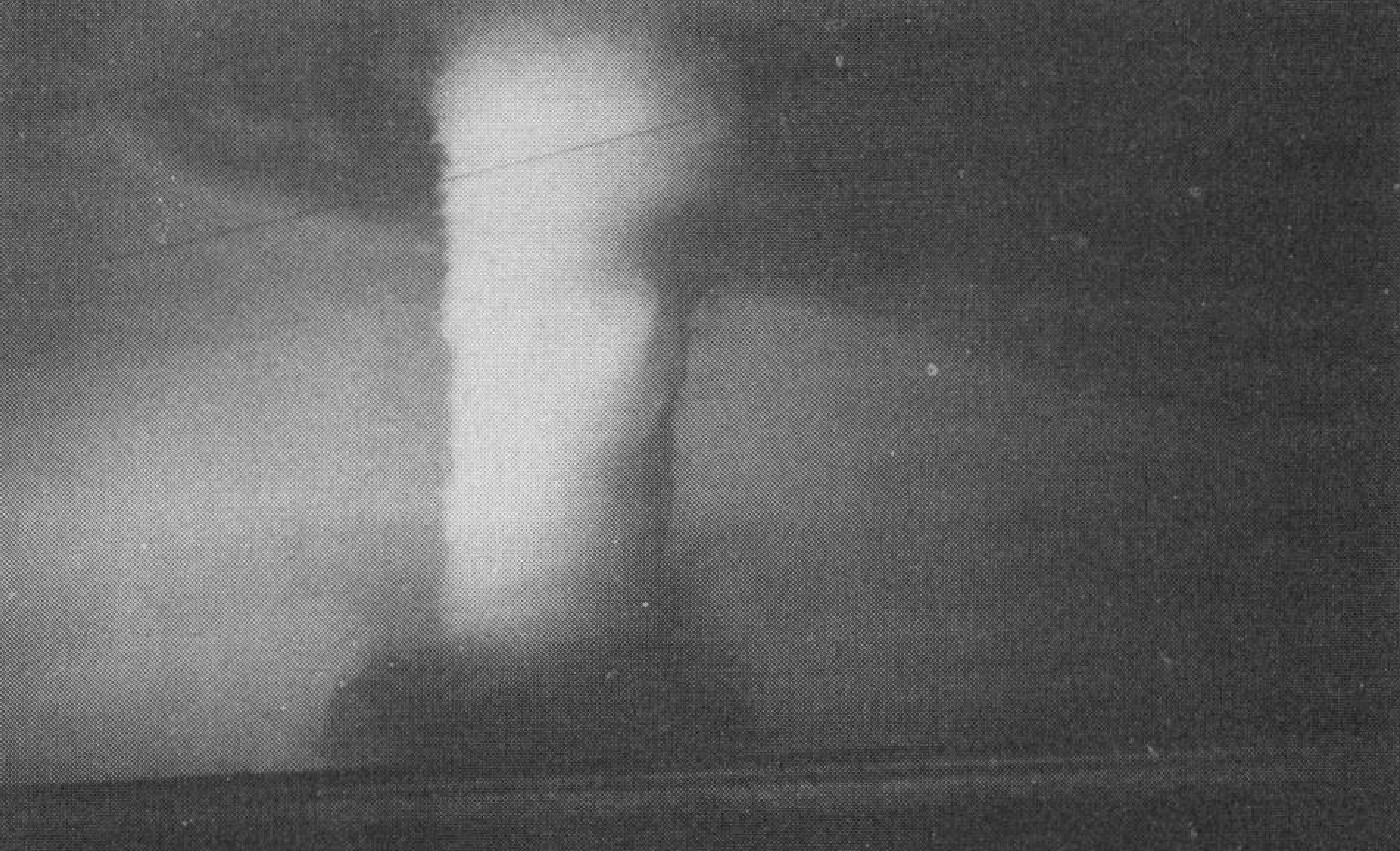
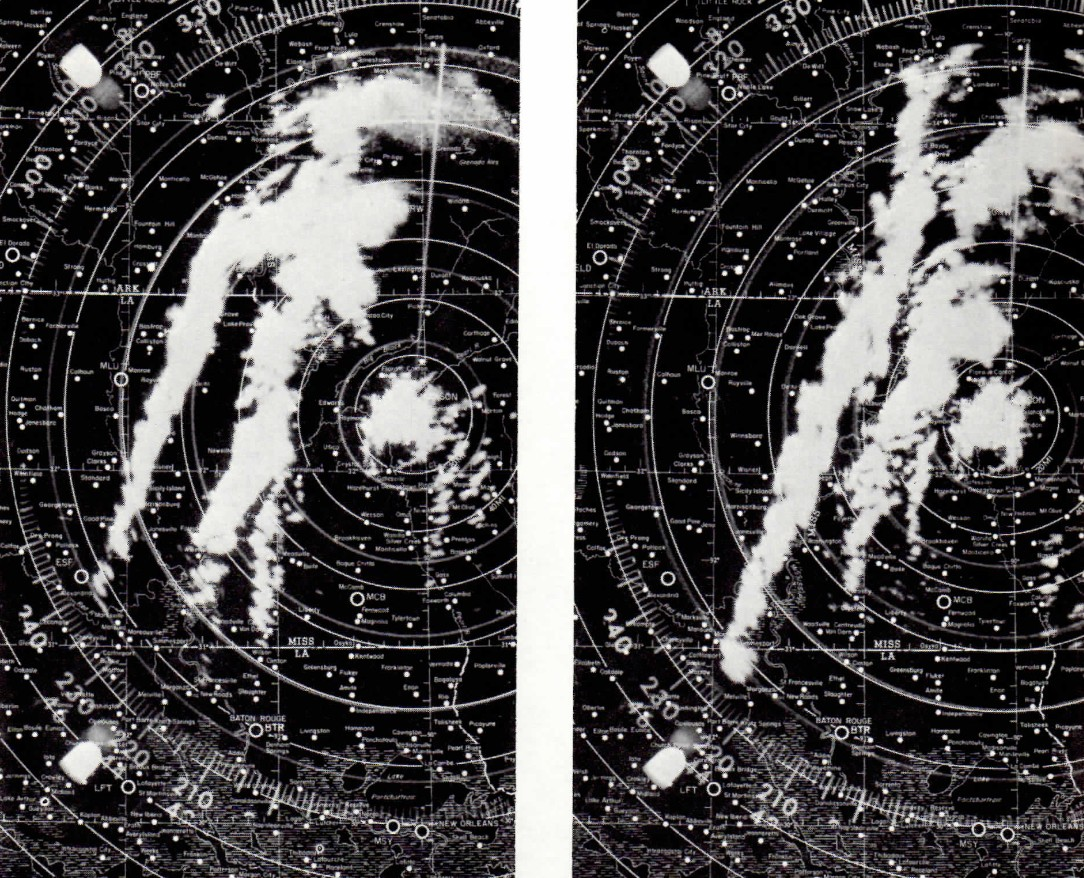
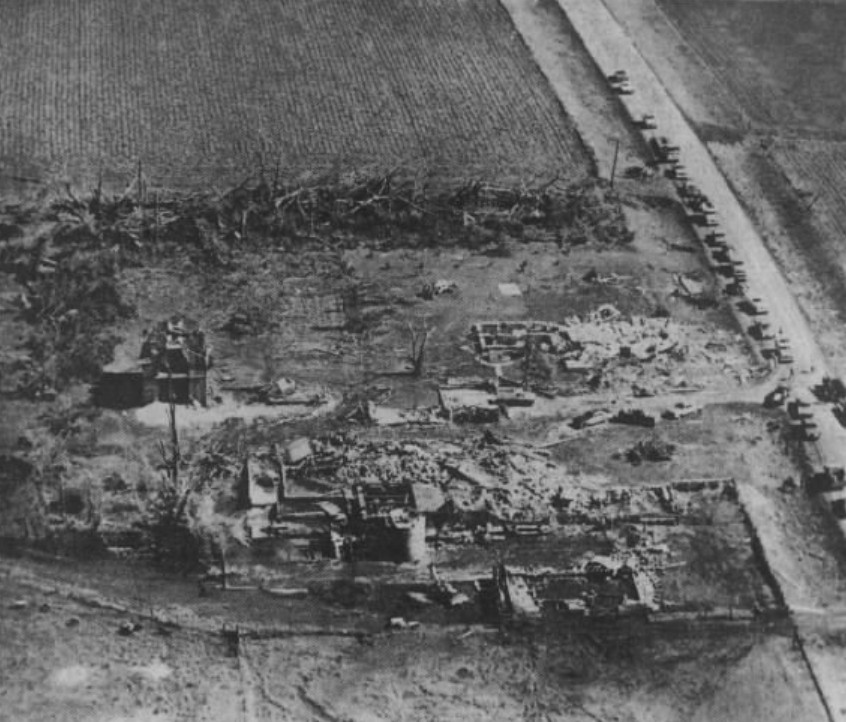
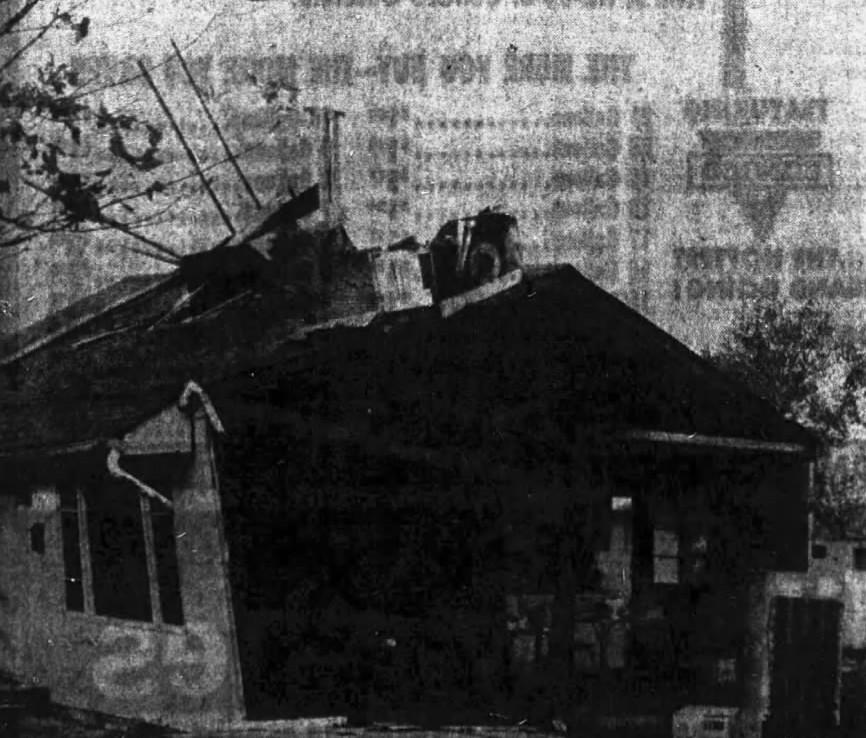
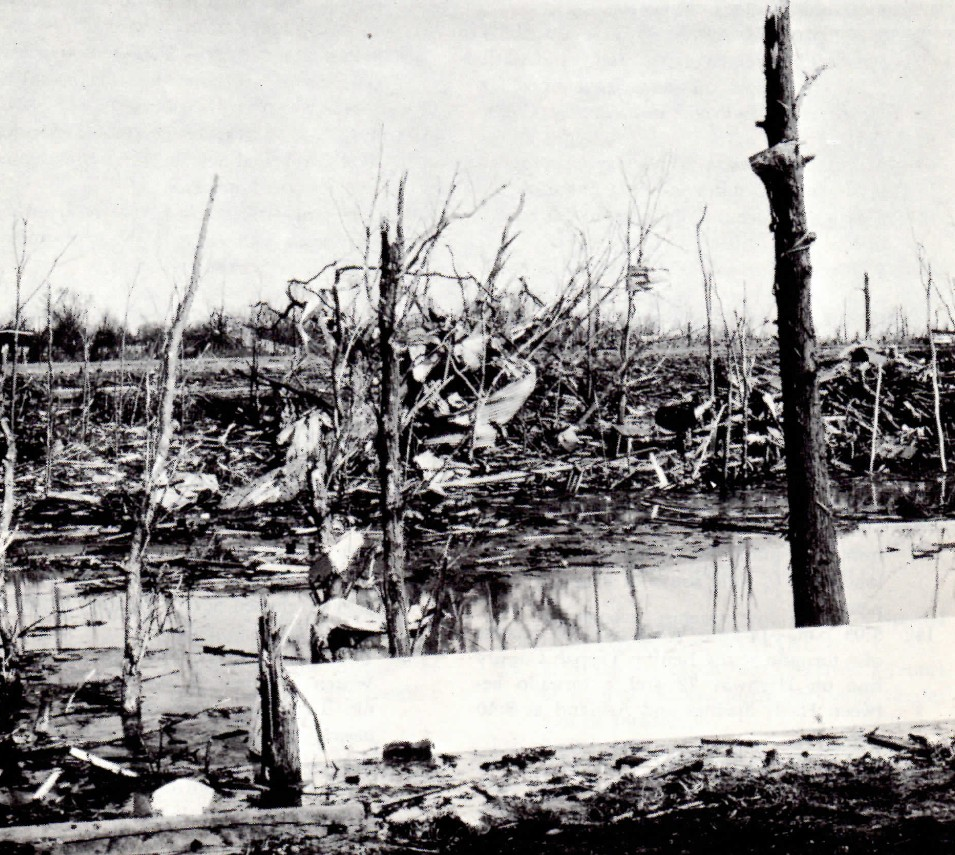
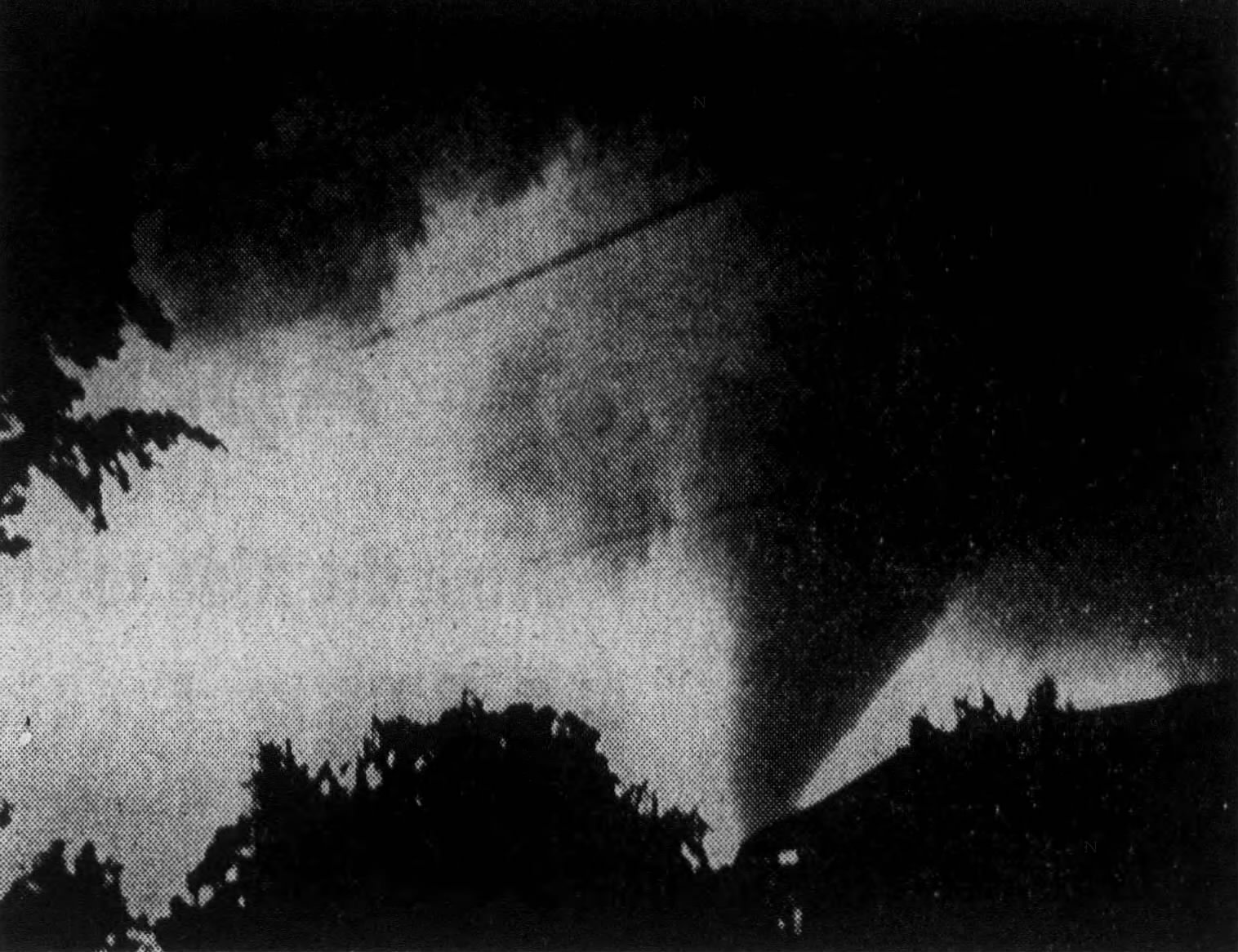
- Clockwise from top: A violent tornado near Sunray, Texas on June 9; A farm in rural Chickasaw County, Iowa after an F4 tornado on July 12; Violent damage near Cary, Mississippi after an F4 on February 21; An F3 tornado near St. Ansgar, Iowa on July 12; Damage to a home in Joplin, Missouri after an F3 tornado on May 5; A radar image showing multiple tornadic supercells during a tornado outbreak on February 21.
- Timespan: January 15 - December 15, 1971
- Maximum rated tornado: F5 tornado: Inverness, Mississippi on February 21
- Tornadoes in U.S.: 889
- Damage (U.S.): Unknown
- Fatalities (U.S.): 159
- Fatalities (worldwide): 160

This page documents the tornadoes and tornado outbreaks of 1971, primarily in the United States. Most tornadoes form in the U.S., although some events may take place internationally. Tornado statistics for older years like this often appear significantly lower than modern years due to fewer reports or confirmed tornadoes. There were 160 Tornado related deaths in 1971, 159 in the United States and 1 in France.

== Events ==
Fatal United States tornadoes in 1971
- Approximate touchdown location of killer tornadoes in 1971
Summary of tornadoes
- January 15 – Georgia (1 death)
- February 4 – Mississippi (7 deaths)
- February 4 – Alabama (1 death)
- February 21 – Louisiana, Mississippi (47 deaths)
- February 21 – Mississippi, Tennessee (58 deaths)
- February 21 – Mississippi (13 deaths)
- February 21 – Mississippi (3 deaths)
- February 22 – North Carolina (2 deaths)
- February 26 – Alabama (3 deaths)
- March 10 – Louisiana (1 death)
- March 12 – Texas (1 death)
- April 23 – Georgia (1 death)
- April 27 – Illinois (1 death)
- April 27 – Kentucky (1 death)
- April 27 – Kentucky (6 deaths)
- April 27 – Kentucky (2 deaths)
- May 5 – Missouri (1 death)
- May 6 – Indiana (1 death)
- May 7 – Tennessee (3 deaths)
- May 9 – Mississippi (1 death)
- May 23 – Texas (1 death)
- June 24 – Iowa (1 death)
- July 18 – Wisconsin (1 death)
- December 14 – Missouri (1 death)
- December 15 – Missouri (1 death)
Total fatalities: 159

Numbers for 1971 were above average for the 1950–1970 period, having a total of 889 confirmed tornadoes. Several very deadly tornadoes occurred, bringing the death total up to 159 people for the yearly total. Over 2700 people were injured by the end of 1971.

=== United States yearly total ===
Confirmed tornadoes by Fujita rating
FU	F0	F1	F2	F3	F4	F5	Total
0	188	380	239	71	10	1	889

== January ==
There were 19 tornadoes were confirmed in the United States in January.

=== January 15 ===
FU	F0	F1	F2	F3	F4	F5
0	1	3	6	0	0	0

An outbreak of 10 tornadoes hit Florida and Georgia. One F2 tornado killed one and injured one outside of Americus, Georgia. Overall, the outbreak killed one and injured four.

=== January 25 (France) ===
An F4 Tornado struck La Rochelle, France, causing severe damage, killing one and injuring 12. Also rated EF3 on the Enhanced Fujita Scale.

=== January 28 ===
FU	F0	F1	F2	F3	F4	F5
0	0	1	1	0	0	0

Two tornadoes touched down in Hawaii. This first tornado, which was rated F1, struck Wahiawa, damaging few buildings. The other tornado was an even stronger F2 tornado that struck several buildings north of Kailua-Kona, injuring four.

== February ==
83 tornadoes were reported in the United States in February.

=== February 4 ===
FU	F0	F1	F2	F3	F4	F5
0	1	5	1	1	0	0

A small tornado outbreak struck parts of the Midwestern and Southern United States. An F2 tornado destroyed a trailer near Gore Springs, Mississippi, killing seven people. An F3 tornado damaged and destroyed homes and other buildings in Sugar Bend, Bear Creek, and Dime, Alabama, killing one person and injuring at least thirteen.

=== February 7 ===
FU	F0	F1	F2	F3	F4	F5
0	1	2	3	2	0	0

A small tornado outbreak occurred in Georgia and Florida, producing two F3 tornadoes in the Pensacola and St. Augustine areas of Florida. There were eight tornadoes overall. No fatalities were reported, but 115 people were injured.

=== February 21–22 ===
FU	F0	F1	F2	F3	F4	F5
0	2	4	7	3	2	1

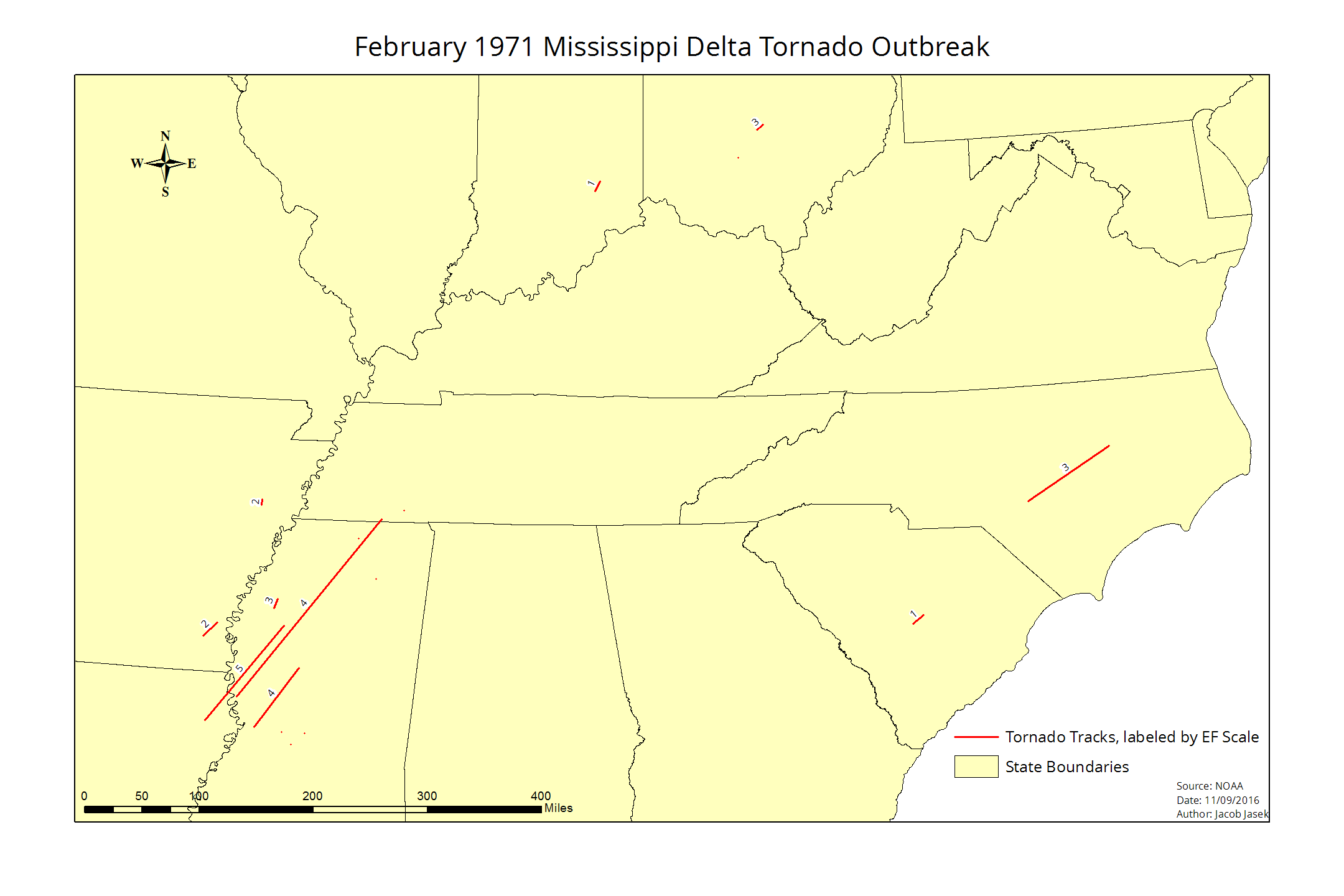
Map detailing tornado tracks of the February 1971 Mississippi Delta tornado outbreak

A deadly tornado outbreak struck portions of the Lower Mississippi River Valley and the Southeastern United States on February 21–22, 1971. The two-day outbreak produced at least 19 tornadoes, and probably several more, mostly brief events in rural areas; killed 123 people across three states; and "virtually leveled" entire communities in the state of Mississippi. Three violent, long-lived tornadoes—two of which may have been tornado families—in western Mississippi and northeastern Louisiana caused most of the deaths along 300 miles (483 km) of path. One of the tornadoes attained F5 intensity in Louisiana, the only such event on record in the state, although the rating is disputed. The outbreak also generated strong tornadoes from Texas to Ohio and North Carolina. The entire outbreak is the second deadliest ever in February, behind only the Enigma tornado outbreak in 1884 and ahead of the 2008 Super Tuesday tornado outbreak. February 21 was the fourth-deadliest day for tornadoes in Mississippi on record. At one point, the National Weather Service WSR-57 radar in Jackson, Mississippi, reported four hook echoes, often indicative of tornado-producing supercells, simultaneously.

== March ==
40 tornadoes were reported in March in the United States.

=== March 12 ===
FU	F0	F1	F2	F3	F4	F5
0	0	5	0	4	1	0

A tornado outbreak impacted southern Oklahoma, northern Texas, and extreme eastern Arkansas. An F4 tornado "exploded" homes in Malta and Daniels Chapel, Texas, killing one person and injuring five. An F3 tornado struck Achille and Yuba, Oklahoma and north of Willis, severely damaging two schools at Achille. Race horses and 100 head of cattle were killed.

== April ==
75 tornadoes were reported in the United States in April.

=== April 26–30 ===
FU	F0	F1	F2	F3	F4	F5
0	2	13	9	4	2	0

A tornado outbreak sequence caused 10 deaths across Kentucky and Illinois. On April 27, an F4 tornado severely damaged or destroyed 101 homes as it pass from Bramlett to Christine, Kentucky, killing six people. Another F4 tornado killed two people in Gosser Ridge, Kentucky. Two F3 tornadoes each killed one person in Illinois and Tennessee. The next day, nine tornadoes stuck in and near the Dallas–Fort Worth metroplex while an isolated F2 tornado injured two people in Georgia. In all, 30 tornadoes touched down across the Midwest, Great Plains, and Southeast. There were 187 injuries to go with the 10 fatalities.

== May ==
166 tornadoes were reported in the United States in May.

=== May 4–13 ===
FU	F0	F1	F2	F3	F4	F5
0	11	34	22	8	1	0

A large outbreak sequence produced 76, including several deadly, tornadoes across the United States. There were six fatalities and 242 injuries.

== June ==
199 tornadoes were reported in June in the United States.

== July ==
100 tornadoes were reported in the United States in July.

== August ==
50 tornadoes were reported in the United States in August.

=== August 26 (Switzerland) ===
A powerful F4 Tornado struck the town of L'Abbaye in Switzerland, the Tornado produced severe damage to cars and homes as well as completely destroying sections of forest.

=== August 30 ===
FU	F0	F1	F2	F3	F4	F5
0	0	0	2	0	0	0

A rare F2 tornado caused severe damage north of Colfax, Washington. Later that day, another F2 tornado caused at least $3 million in damages and injured 41 people in Tempe, Arizona, the highest number of injuries from a single tornado in Arizona history. The worst damage occurred at the Holiday Village Mobile Home Court, where 35 trailers were destroyed. There was one indirect fatality, a man who died of a heart attack during the storm.

== September ==
47 tornadoes were reported in the United States in September.

== October ==
38 tornadoes were reported in the United States in October.

== November ==
16 tornadoes were reported in the United States in November.

== December ==
56 tornadoes were reported in the United States in December.

=== December 14–15 ===
FU	F0	F1	F2	F3	F4	F5
0	2	19	17	2	0	0

A very destructive outbreak of 40 tornadoes pummeled the Great Plains, Midwest, and Mississippi Valley, including the Dallas–Fort Worth and Springfield, Missouri metropolitan areas. One long-tracked F2 tornado on December 14 passed through the Western suburbs of Springfield, Missouri, killing one and injuring 22. Overall, the outbreak killed two and injured 119.

== See also ==
- Tornado
  - Tornadoes by year
  - Tornado records
  - Tornado climatology
  - Tornado myths
- List of tornado outbreaks
  - List of F5 and EF5 tornadoes
  - List of North American tornadoes and tornado outbreaks
  - List of 21st-century Canadian tornadoes and tornado outbreaks
  - List of European tornadoes and tornado outbreaks
  - List of tornadoes and tornado outbreaks in Asia
  - List of Southern Hemisphere tornadoes and tornado outbreaks
  - List of tornadoes striking downtown areas
- Tornado intensity
  - Fujita scale
  - Enhanced Fujita scale
