= 1971 Joplin tornado =

1971 tornado in Missouri, U.S.

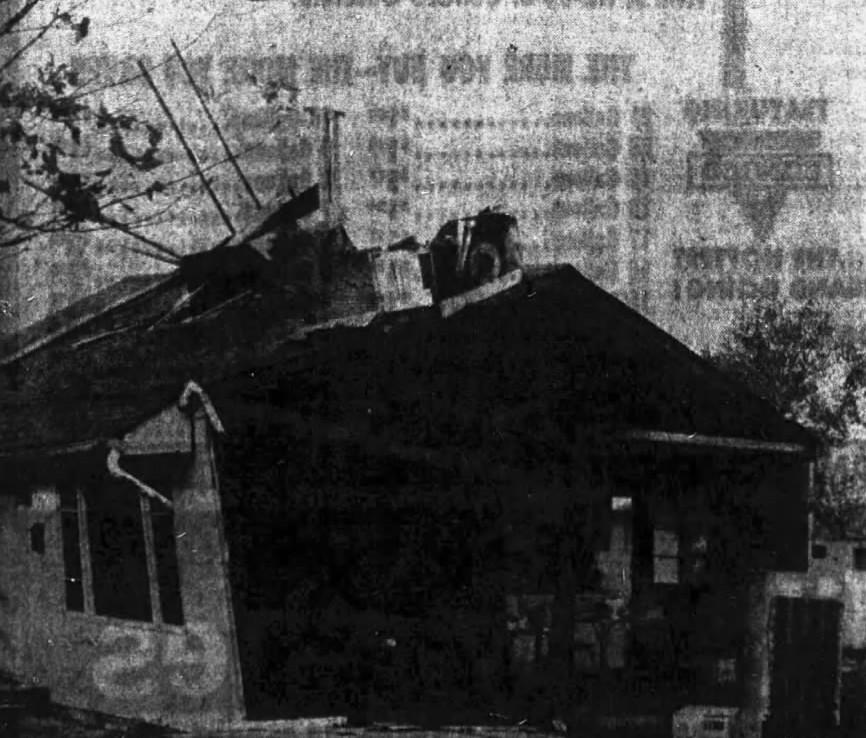
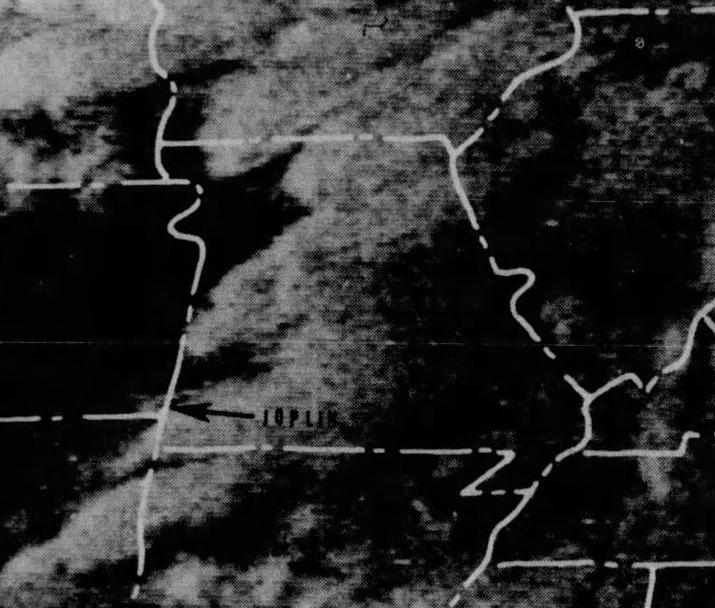
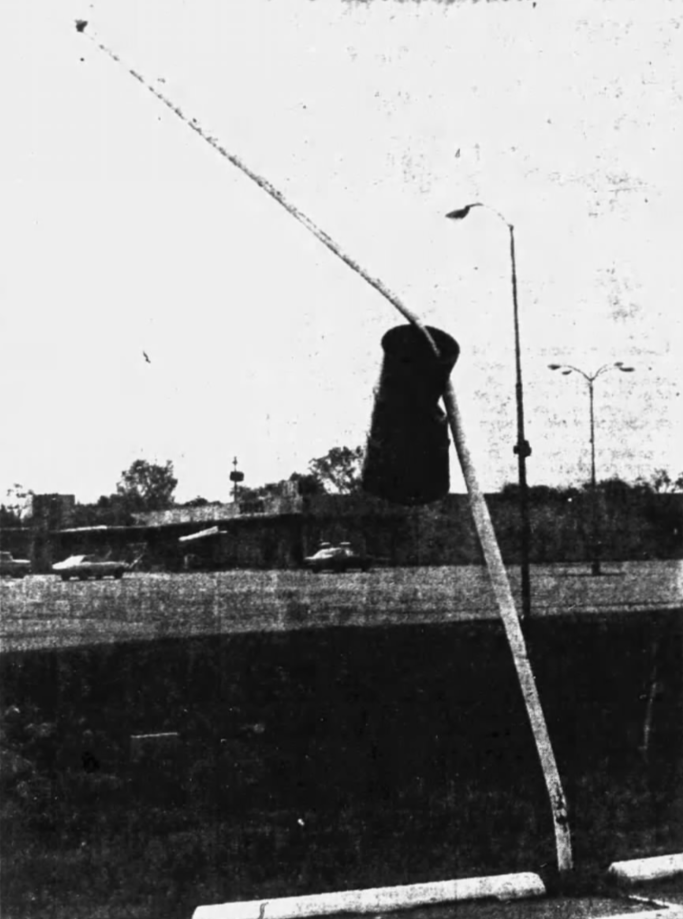
- Clockwise from top: Significant damage to a home following the tornado; A barrel that was driven through a light pole by the tornado; The storm system that produced the tornado

Meteorological history
- Formed: May 5, 1971, 5:55 p.m. CST
- Dissipated: May 5, 1971

F3 tornado
- on the Fujita scale
- Max width: 70–700 yards (0.040–0.398 mi; 0.064–0.640 km) (Note: The Storm Events Database states 70 yards, while the original publication states 700 yards. Because of this, both measurements are listed.)
- Path length: 13.1 miles (21.1 km)
- Highest winds: 158–206 mph (254–332 km/h)

Overall effects
- Fatalities: 1
- Injuries: 60
- Damage: $2.5 million (1971 USD)
- Areas affected: Joplin, Missouri
- Houses destroyed: 10
- Part of the Tornadoes of 1971

During the early evening hours of May 5, 1971, an intense and destructive tornado touched down near the southwest corner of Joplin, Missouri, United States, before moving northeast into the city. The tornado tracked across 37 blocks, inflicting significant damage to numerous houses and dozens of businesses, with 10 homes being completely destroyed. One man was killed, and dozens of people sustained injuries. The damage totaled to $2.5 million (1971 USD). The tornado occurred only ten days after a severe hail storm struck the city, and was one of the most intense and only fatal tornado to occur in Joplin until the EF5 that struck on May 22, 2011.

== Meteorological synopsis ==
The tornado that struck Joplin was part of a larger tornado outbreak, where at least 14 tornadoes touched down in southwestern Missouri and numerous others occurred in the states of Oklahoma, Kansas, Nebraska, Arkansas, and Iowa.

== Tornado summary ==
The tornado first touched down at 5:55 p.m. CST, just northeast of the Schifferdecker Avenue/Gabby Street intersection before moving to the northeast, striking the Eastmoreland Plaza Shopping Center, where the Foodtown Super Market, Sears store, and other businesses sustained significant damage. Shortly after the tornado touched down, the tornado sirens were activated. The tornado traveled eastward along 7th Street to St. Louis Street before impacting the Missouri Highway Department Building near 4th Street and Range Line Road. The tornado then struck Missouri Southern College, where hundreds of students were present. The tornado uprooted a few trees near the campus before approaching the Anderson's Mobile Trailer Park. Residents within the park saw the tornado and headed towards a large ditch for shelter. A college student was killed after being struck in the back of the head with flying debris while attempting to reach the ditch. The trailer park was destroyed, with debris being dispersed across a 4 miles (6.4 km) long swath. More significant damage then occurred in an area that was 5 miles (8.0 km) long and two blocks wide, where a large department store was completely leveled. Several large semi-trucks were flipped upside down in this area, and over 8,000 telephone poles were destroyed throughout the city. One house along Travis Acres and Newman Road had its garage completely leveled.

The tornado continued northeast, damaging several farm buildings on a farm 1 mile (1.6 km) west of Highway 71, before dissipating 3 miles (4.8 km) south of Carthage, Missouri.

Hundreds of houses and numerous businesses were damaged along the tornado's 13.1 mile (21.1 km) path.

== Aftermath ==
=== Damage ===
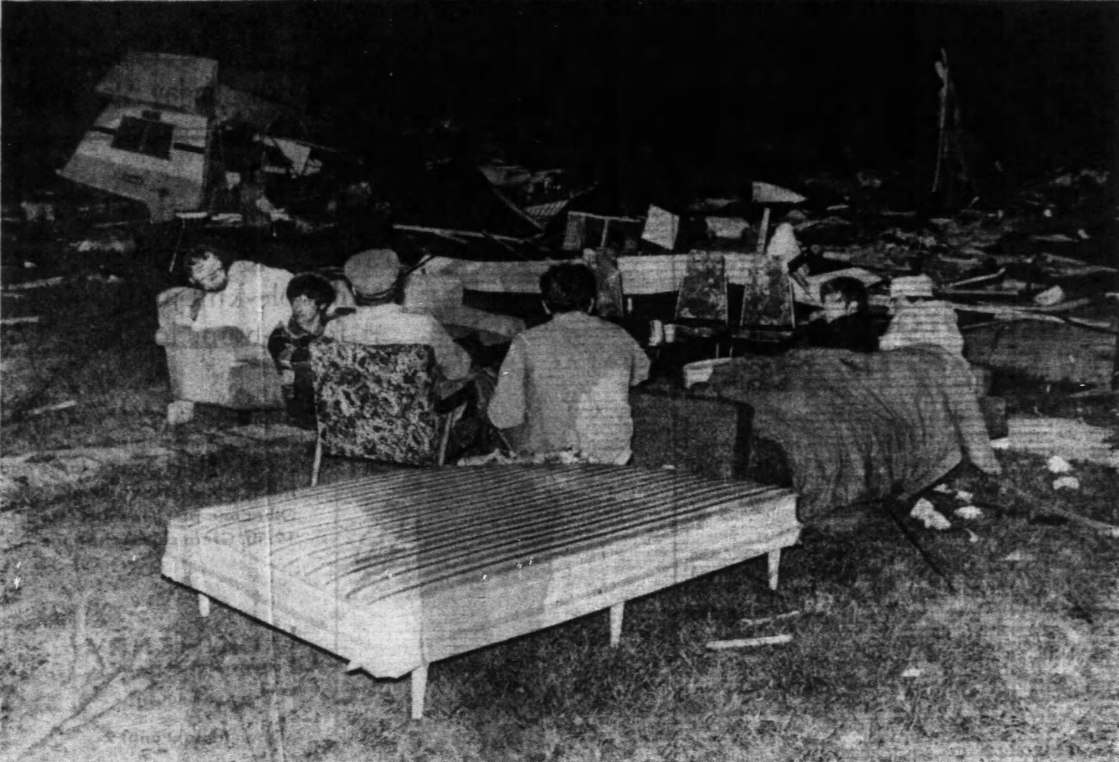
The remains of the Anderson's Mobile Trailer Park

Damage within the city of Joplin was significant, with the tornado occurring only 10 days after a severe hail storm. 22 businesses suffered severe damage, and an additional 70 sustained minor damage. 10 homes were completely destroyed, with 60 houses sustaining major damage and 320 houses sustaining minor damage. 15 mobile homes sustained damage, and 400 families were directly affected. A service station sustained severe damage. The W.J. Nelson Electric Co. building suffered significant damage, with half the structure being destroyed. Portions of the R & S Chevrolet building collapsed, with a fire breaking out within the body shop section. Part of the Missouri Highway Department Building was destroyed. The Foodtown Super Market was severely damaged, with other buildings within the Eastmoreland Plaza Shopping Center sustaining damage as well. Various businesses along Rangeline Road were gutted by the tornado. Various vehicles sustained damage from flying debris, downed trees, or the tornado's winds, with two dozen new cars at the R & S Chevrolet building being completely destroyed. Trees were uprooted or snapped, and over 8,000 telephone poles were destroyed by the tornado. 50% of the city's streets were blocked by debris from the storm. Electrical services were also impacted. Exposed electrical wires reportedly started numerous fires. Nearly all the signs along the tornado's path were knocked over. The tornado was rated F3 on the Fujita scale.

=== Siren controversy ===
Following the tornado, it was discovered that the tornado sirens were not activated until the tornado was well within the city of Joplin, despite earlier warnings from the National Weather Service. This reportedly sparked discussions over storm alert procedures, with the Joplin Civil Defense director defending the actions of the city, stating that "So many warnings have sounded falsely in the past," and "We don't want to holler 'wolf' too often."

=== Recovery efforts ===
Over 1100 National Guardsmen were called to the city shortly after the tornado, and patrolled the affected areas in pairs to prevent looting. Several arrests were made. Missouri Governor Warren E. Hearnes declared Joplin a disaster area after viewing the damage from an air and ground tour with Joplin Mayor Larry Hickey. State Highway Patrol trucks were utilized to clear debris within the city, and the Small Business Administration was authorized to give out low-interest loans. All schools within Joplin were closed for a day following the tornado. 200 crewmen from all across Missouri arrived to Joplin to restore telephone services. Many impacted individuals stayed overnight at the Memorial High School, with an emergency food service opening in the building's cafeteria. Numerous sightseers reportedly interfered with recovery, with traffic congestion being reported in the area due to the amount of visitors.

=== Casualties ===
One person, Rick Johnson, was killed by the tornado due to flying debris, and 60 others, including Johnson's wife, sustained injuries, eight of which were severe. Thirty-one people were treated at St. John's Hospital and Freeman's Hospital within Joplin, and at McCune Brooks Hospital within the nearby city of Carthrage.

The tornado remained the only one to cause a fatality and one of the highest-rated to strike the city of Joplin until an EF5 tornado struck on May 22, 2011, killing 158 people.
