= 1971 Gosser Ridge tornado =

F4 tornado

- Violent tornado damage within the community of Gosser Ridge

Meteorological history
- Formed: April 27, 1971 , 9:53 PM EST (UTC–05:00)
- Dissipated: April 27, 1971 , 10:10 PM EST (UTC–05:00)
- Duration: 17 minutes

F4 tornado
- on the Fujita scale
- Highest winds: 207 to 260 mph (333 to 418 km/h)

Overall effects
- Fatalities: 2
- Injuries: 72
- Damage: $2.5 million (1971 USD)
- Areas affected: Russell and Pulaski County, Kentucky
- Part of the tornadoes of 1971

On April 27, 1971, a violent F4 tornado struck Gosser Ridge and other parts of Russell and Pulaski County, Kentucky. In November 1999, the National Climatic Data Center published a list of the historical F5 tornadoes in the United States from 1880 to 1999, which rated the Gosser Ridge tornado as an F5 tornado. It was later officially downgraded to an F4 tornado.

== Synopsis ==
The tornado touched down roughly two miles north of Russell Springs just past the Adair and Russell County border around 9:53 PM EST. For the next few miles east-southeast from touching down, the tornado skipped, lifting and dropping multiple times. Around 8 miles (13 km) east of Russell Springs, aerial surveys showed two distinct paths approximately 0.25 miles (0.40 km) apart through a roadside park. The paths indicated a possible twin or satellite tornado, or a single, large, multiple vortex tornado. The path farthest to the east contained the most severe damage in this area. After the damage paths merged, the tornado turned due east and briefly lifted and touched down again where it damaged several homes. The tornado then grew to a width of 300 yards (270 m) as it struck Salem School, where several people were injured. Numerous homes around the school were destroyed and the school was severely damaged, with at least US$150,000 worth of damage to the school.

The tornado continued on its eastward track as it entered the community of Gosser Ridge. In Gosser Ridge, the tornado destroyed a farmhouse, killing two people and destroying nearly every building. Several other homes were destroyed and multiple injuries occurred in Gosser Ridge. In Gosser Ridge, "questionable F5" damage occurred, which led the National Oceanic and Atmospheric Administration and the Nuclear Regulatory Commission to rate the tornado F5 on the Fujita scale. In August 2000, the tornado was still rated F5, however, it was later downgraded to F4. The tornado then continued into Pulaski County, where it struck the community of Faubush. In Faubush, two people were injured, several structures were damaged or destroyed and a mobile home was destroyed. In Russell County, the tornado injured a total of 70 people, destroyed 174 structures and damaged 105 others. At an unspecified farm in Russell County, it was reported that the tornado struck a chicken farm, where it plucked chickens of all their feathers, but left them alive. In total, the tornado caused anywhere from US$2.5 million to US$5 million in property damage along its path of 14 miles (23 km).

== See also ==
- Tornadoes of 1971
- List of F4 and EF4 tornadoes
- 1974 Brandenburg tornado - The only official F5 rated tornado within the state of Kentucky
- 2025 Somerset-London tornado - An EF4 tornado that struck Pulaski County in 2025
