= Waverly, Louisiana =

- Unincorporated community
- Location within Louisiana Location within the United States
- Coordinates: 32°26′47″N 91°24′41″W
- Country: United States
- State: Louisiana
- Parish: Madison
- Elevation: 69 ft (21 m)
- Time zone: UTC-6 (Central (EST))
  - Summer (DST): UTC-5 (CDT)
- GNIS feature ID: 556375

Waverly is an unincorporated community located in Madison Parish, Louisiana, United States.

On the afternoon of Sunday, February 21, 1971, a large and long-tracked F5 tornado impacted Waverly.
