= Little Yazoo, Mississippi =

- Unincorporated community
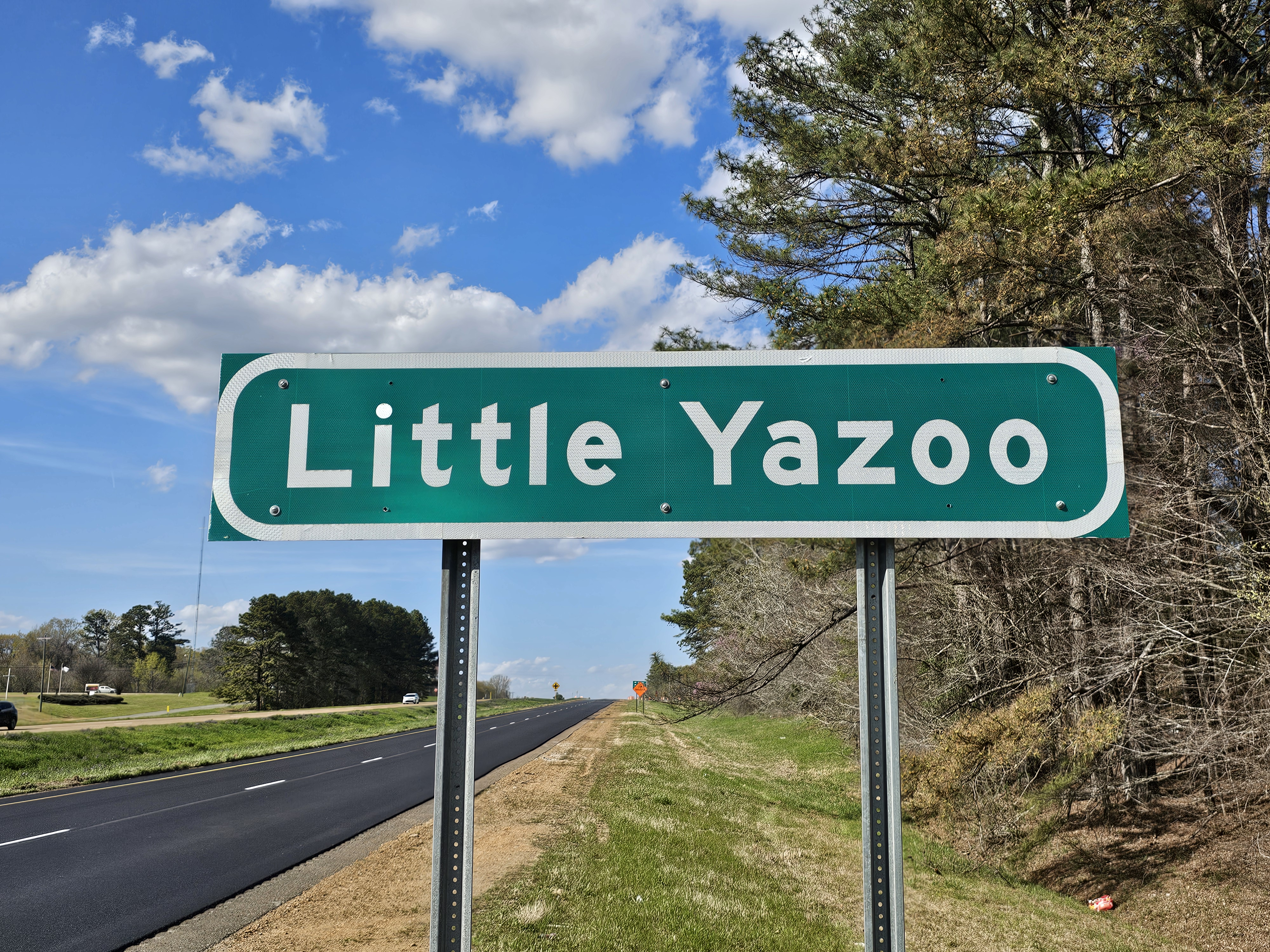
- Highway Sign outside of Little Yazoo

- Location within Mississippi Location within the United States
- Coordinates: 32°42′28″N 90°22′21″W
- Country: United States
- State: Mississippi
- County: Yazoo
- Elevation: 351 ft (107 m)
- Time zone: UTC-6 (Central (CST))
  - Summer (DST): UTC-5 (CDT)
- ZIP code: 39194
- Area code: 662
- GNIS feature ID: 672712

Little Yazoo is an unincorporated community located in Yazoo County, Mississippi. Little Yazoo is approximately 5 miles (8.0 km) north of Bentonia and 2 miles (3.2 km) northeast of Anding on U.S. Route 49.

Residents are within the Yazoo County School District. Residents are zoned to Yazoo County Middle School and Yazoo County High School.
