= Transylvania, Louisiana =

Transylvania
- Unincorporated community
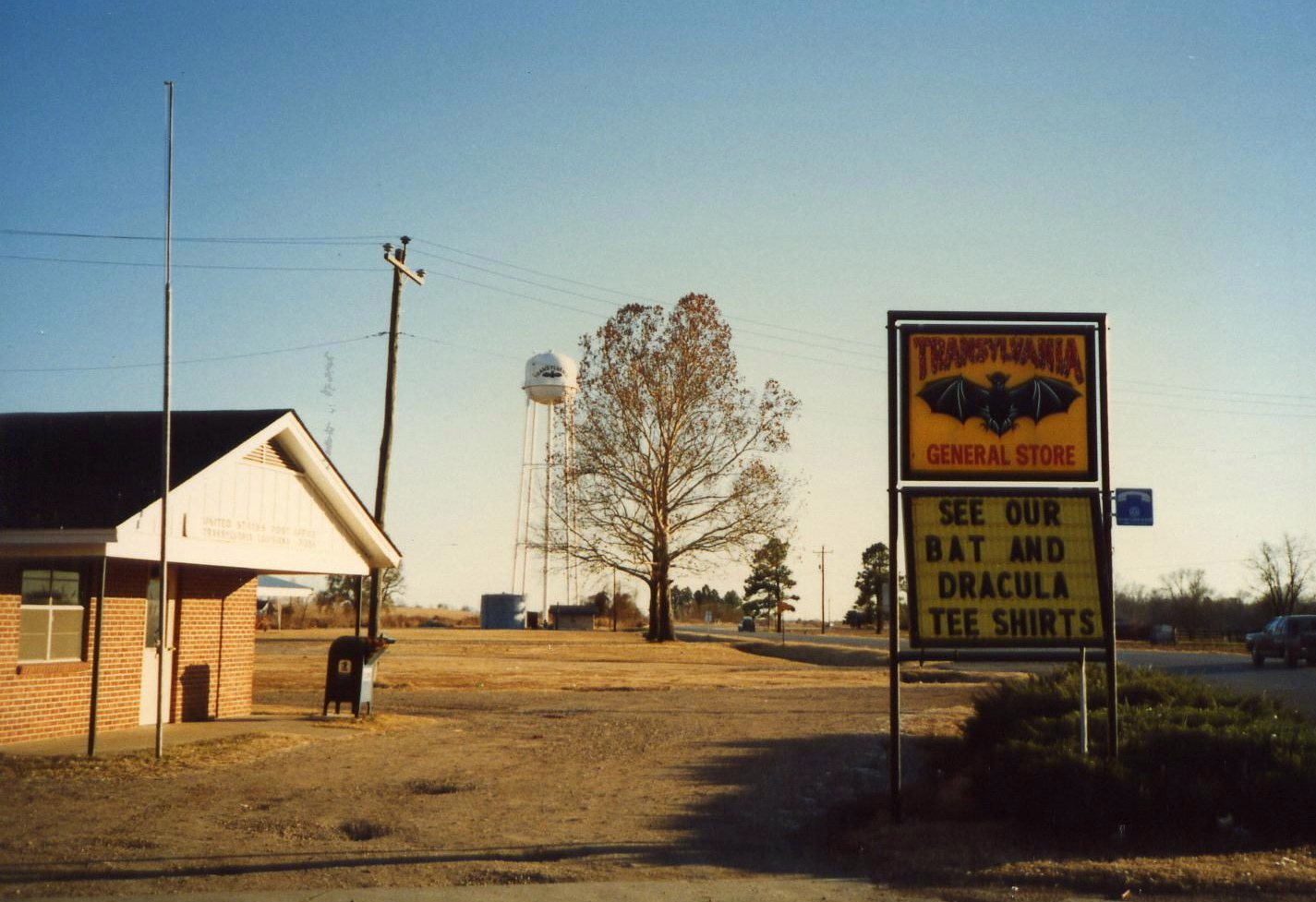
- Transylvania: Post office, water tower, and sign for general store.

- Location of Transylvania in Louisiana
- Coordinates: 32°40′42″N 91°10′57″W
- Country: United States
- State: Louisiana
- Parish: East Carroll
- Elevation: 98 ft (30 m)
- Time zone: UTC-6 (CST)
  - Summer (DST): UTC-5 (CDT)
- ZIP codes: 71286

Transylvania is an unincorporated community in East Carroll Parish, Louisiana, United States. As of the 2000 census, the population of Transylvania was 743.

== Geography ==
Transylvania is located approximately 10 miles (16 km) south of Lake Providence on U.S. Highway 65, at the junction with LA 581, near the Mississippi River.

== History ==
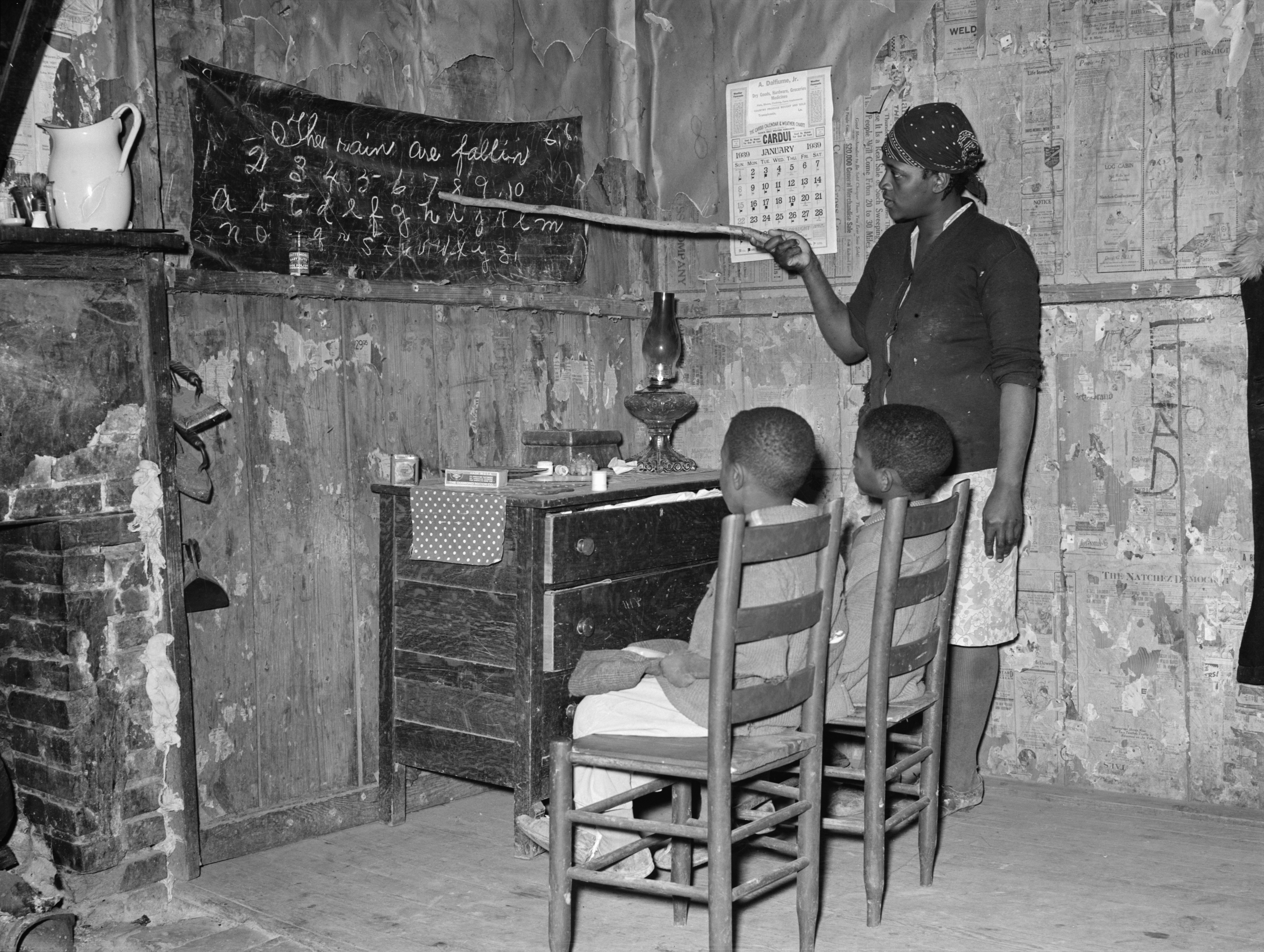
Mother teaching her children in Transylvania, 1939. Photo by Russell Lee.

Transylvania was named in the early 19th century by Transylvania University alumnus Dr. W. L. Richards. He bought large acreage in the northern Louisiana area and named the town after his beloved school, still in existence today in Lexington, Kentucky.

As the name of Transylvania is associated by many people in the United States with the Hollywood Dracula movies, the general store in the town sells Dracula- and bat-related merchandise to people passing through on Highway 65.

On the afternoon of Sunday, February 21, 1971, a large and long-tracked F5 tornado impacted Transylvania.

== Education ==
All of the community is in the East Carroll Parish School Board.

By 2005 Transylvania Elementary School had stopped operations and was abandoned.
