= Fitler, Mississippi =

- Unincorporated community
- Location within Mississippi Location within the United States
- Coordinates: 32°43′31″N 91°02′01″W
- Country: United States
- State: Mississippi
- County: Issaquena
- Elevation: 98 ft (30 m)
- Time zone: UTC-6 (Central (CST))
  - Summer (DST): UTC-5 (CDT)
- GNIS feature ID: 691861

Fitler is an unincorporated community in Issaquena County, Mississippi, United States. Fitler is located on Mississippi Highway 1, approximately six miles west of Onward. Fitler had a post office from about 1901 to 1976.

In 2012, a 697.5 lb (316.4 kg) alligator was taken at a hunting camp near Fitler, setting a new Mississippi weight record.

Robert E. Foster, who served in the Mississippi House of Representatives from 1912 to 1931, lived in Fitler.
