= Jefferson Davis =

President of the Confederate States from 1861 to 1865

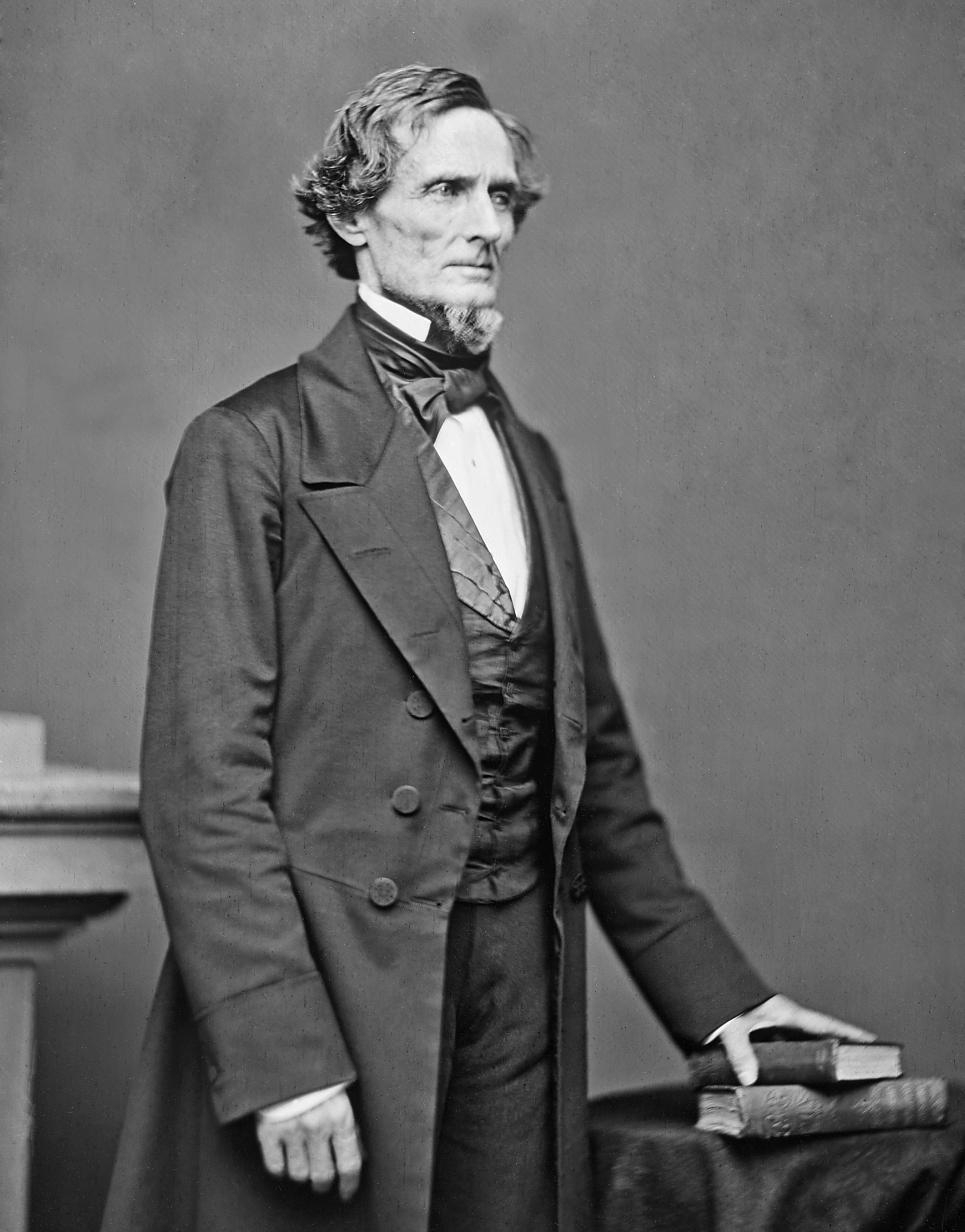
- Davis in 1859

President of the Confederate States
- In office February 22, 1862 (Note: Provisional: February 18, 1861 – February 22, 1862) – May 5, 1865
- Vice President: Alexander H. Stephens
- Preceded by: Office established
- Succeeded by: Office abolished

United States Senator from Mississippi
- In office March 4, 1857 – January 21, 1861
- Preceded by: Stephen Adams
- Succeeded by: Adelbert Ames (1870)
- In office August 10, 1847 – September 23, 1851
- Preceded by: Jesse Speight
- Succeeded by: John J. McRae

23rd United States Secretary of War
- In office March 7, 1853 – March 4, 1857
- President: Franklin Pierce
- Preceded by: Charles Conrad
- Succeeded by: John B. Floyd

Member of the U.S. House of Representatives from Mississippi's at-large district
- In office December 8, 1845 – October 28, 1846; Seat D
- Preceded by: Tilghman Tucker
- Succeeded by: Henry T. Ellett

Personal details
- Born: Jefferson F. Davis; June 3, 1808 Fairview, Kentucky, U.S.
- Died: December 6, 1889 (aged 81) New Orleans, Louisiana, U.S.
- Resting place: Hollywood Cemetery
- Party: Democratic
- Other political affiliations: Southern Rights
- Spouses: Sarah Knox Taylor (m. 1835; died 1835); Varina Howell (m. 1845)
- Children: 6, including Varina
- Education: United States Military Academy

Military service
- Allegiance: United States; Mississippi
- Branch/service: United States Army; United States Volunteers; Mississippi Army
- Years of service: 1825–1835; 1846–1847; 1861
- Rank: First lieutenant; Colonel; Major general
- Unit: 1st U.S. Dragoons
- Commands: 1st Mississippi Rifles
- Battles/wars: American Indian Wars; Black Hawk War; Mexican-American War; Battle of Monterrey; Battle of Buena Vista (WIA); American Civil War

Jefferson F. Davis (June 3, 1808 – December 6, 1889) was the only president of the Confederate States, from 1861 to 1865, leading the Confederacy during the American Civil War. Before the war, he was a member of the Democratic Party who represented Mississippi in the House of Representatives from 1845 to 1846 and in the United States Senate from 1857 to 1861. From 1853 to 1857, he served as the 23rd United States secretary of war during the administration of President Franklin Pierce.

Davis, the youngest of ten children, was born in Fairview, Kentucky, but spent most of his childhood in Wilkinson County, Mississippi. His eldest brother, Joseph Emory Davis, secured the younger Davis's appointment to the United States Military Academy. Upon graduating, he served six years as a lieutenant in the United States Army.

After leaving the army in 1835, Davis married Sarah Knox Taylor, daughter of future president Zachary Taylor. Sarah died from malaria three months after the wedding. Davis became a cotton planter, building Brierfield Plantation in Mississippi on his brother Joseph's land and eventually owning as many as 113 slaves. In 1845, Davis married Varina Howell. During the same year, he was elected to the United States House of Representatives, serving for one year. From 1846 to 1847, he fought in the Mexican–American War as the colonel of a volunteer regiment. He was appointed to the United States Senate in 1847, resigning to unsuccessfully run for governor of Mississippi. In 1853, President Franklin Pierce appointed him Secretary of War. After Pierce's administration ended in 1857, Davis returned to the Senate. He resigned in 1861 when Mississippi seceded from the United States.

During the Civil War, Davis guided the Confederacy's policies and served as its commander in chief. When the Confederacy was defeated in 1865, Davis was captured, arrested for alleged complicity in the assassination of Abraham Lincoln, accused of treason, and imprisoned at Fort Monroe. He was released without trial after two years. Immediately after the war, Davis was often blamed for the Confederacy's defeat, but after his release from prison, the Lost Cause of the Confederacy movement considered him to be a hero. In the late 19th and the 20th centuries, his legacy as a Confederate leader was celebrated in the South. In the 21st century, his leadership of the Confederacy has been seen as constituting treason, and he has been frequently criticized as a supporter of slavery and racism. Many of the memorials dedicated to him throughout the United States have been removed.

== Early life ==
=== Birth and family background ===
Jefferson F. (Note: Davis used the initial F., but there is no evidence what his middle name was. Some historians argue that the claim that it was "Finis" originated in Davis's biography by Hudson Strode, who provides no citation. (Also see Rice University 2018.)) Davis was the youngest of ten children of Jane and Samuel Emory Davis. Samuel Davis's father, Evan, who had a Welsh background, came to the colony of Georgia from Philadelphia. (Note: Clement Eaton, William Davis, and William Cooper agree that evidence about Evan Davis's origins is unclear (cf., Davis 1927, pp. 16–19, which is cited by Eaton.)) Samuel served in the Continental Army during the American Revolutionary War, and received a land grant for his service near present-day Washington, Georgia. He married Jane Cook, a woman of Scotch-Irish descent whom he had met in South Carolina during his military service, in 1783. Around 1793, Samuel and Jane moved to Kentucky. Jefferson was born on June 3, 1808, (Note: Historians William Davis and William Cooper acknowledge that Davis's birth year is uncertain; he may have been born in 1807. William Davis argues that 1807 is more likely correct based on Davis's own writings, his West Point muster rolls, and an 1850 biography by Collin S. Tarpley written in collaboration with Davis; Cooper argues that 1808 is more likely correct because Davis stated in two letters written in 1858 and 1878 that this was the year his mother told him.) at the family homestead in Davisburg, a village Samuel had established that later became Fairview, Kentucky. He was named after then-President Thomas Jefferson.

=== Early education ===
In 1811, the Davis family moved to the vicinity of Bayou Teche, in Attakapas Parish, Territory of Orleans, now St. Mary Parish, Louisiana. Less than a year later, they moved to a farm near Woodville, in Wilkinson County, Mississippi Territory, where Samuel cultivated cotton, acquired twelve slaves, and built a house that Jane called Rosemont. During the War of 1812, three of Davis's brothers served in the military. When Davis was around five, he began attending a rudimentary schoolhouse near Woodville. When he was about eight, his father sent him and his relatives to attend Saint Thomas College, a Catholic preparatory school run by Dominicans near Springfield, Kentucky. They were escorted on their journey northeast on the Natchez Trace by planter and Mississippi militia officer Thomas Hinds. In 1818, Davis returned to Mississippi, where as a 10-year-old he briefly studied at Jefferson College in Washington. He then attended the Wilkinson Academy near Woodville for five years. In 1823, Davis attended Transylvania University in Lexington, Kentucky. While he was still in college in 1824, he learned that his father Samuel had died. Before his death, Samuel had fallen into debt and sold Rosemont and most of his slaves to his eldest son Joseph Emory Davis, who already owned a large estate in Davis Bend, Mississippi, about 15 miles (24 km) south of Vicksburg, Mississippi. Joseph, who was 23 years older than Jefferson, informally became his surrogate father.

=== West Point and early military career ===
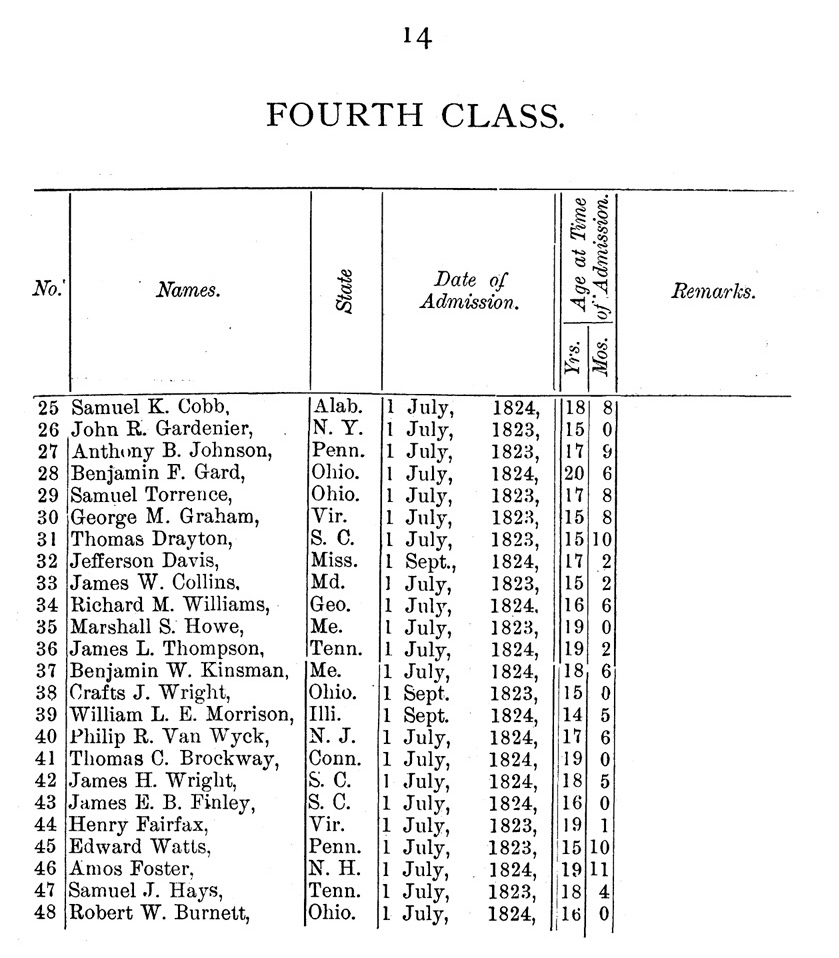
1825 West Point class register listing Davis (Note: Davis entered the same year as future Civil War figures Hugh W. Mercer, Seth Eastman, and Thomas Drayton; his Natchez District neighbor Walter B. Guion (son of Isaac Guion), who was expelled after the eggnog riot; and Samuel J. Hays, a nephew of Andrew Jackson.)

His older brother Joseph got Davis appointed to the United States Military Academy at West Point on September 1, 1824, where he became friends with classmates Albert Sidney Johnston and Leonidas Polk. Davis frequently challenged the academy's discipline. In his first year, he was court-martialed for drinking at the nearby tavern of Benny Havens. He was found guilty but was pardoned. The following year, he was placed under house arrest for his role in the eggnog riot during Christmas 1826 but was not dismissed. He graduated 23rd in a class of 33.

Second Lieutenant Davis was assigned to the 1st Infantry Regiment. He was accompanied by his personal servant James Pemberton, an enslaved African American whom he inherited from his father. In early 1829, he was stationed at Forts Crawford and Winnebago in Michigan Territory under the command of Colonel Zachary Taylor, who later became president of the United States.

Throughout his life, Davis regularly suffered from ill health. During the northern winters, he had pneumonia, colds, and bronchitis. He went to Mississippi on furlough in March 1832, missing the outbreak of the Black Hawk War, and returned to duty just before the Battle of Bad Axe, which ended the war. When Black Hawk was captured, Davis escorted him for detention in St. Louis. Black Hawk stated that Davis treated him with kindness.

After Davis's return to Fort Crawford in January 1833, he and Taylor's daughter, Sarah, became romantically involved. Davis asked Taylor if he could marry Sarah, but Taylor refused. In spring, Taylor had him assigned to the United States Regiment of Dragoons under Colonel Henry Dodge. He was promoted to first lieutenant and deployed at Fort Gibson in Arkansas Territory. In February 1835, Davis was court-martialed for insubordination. He was acquitted. He requested a furlough, and immediately after it ended, he tendered his resignation, which was effective on June 30.

== Planting career and first marriage ==
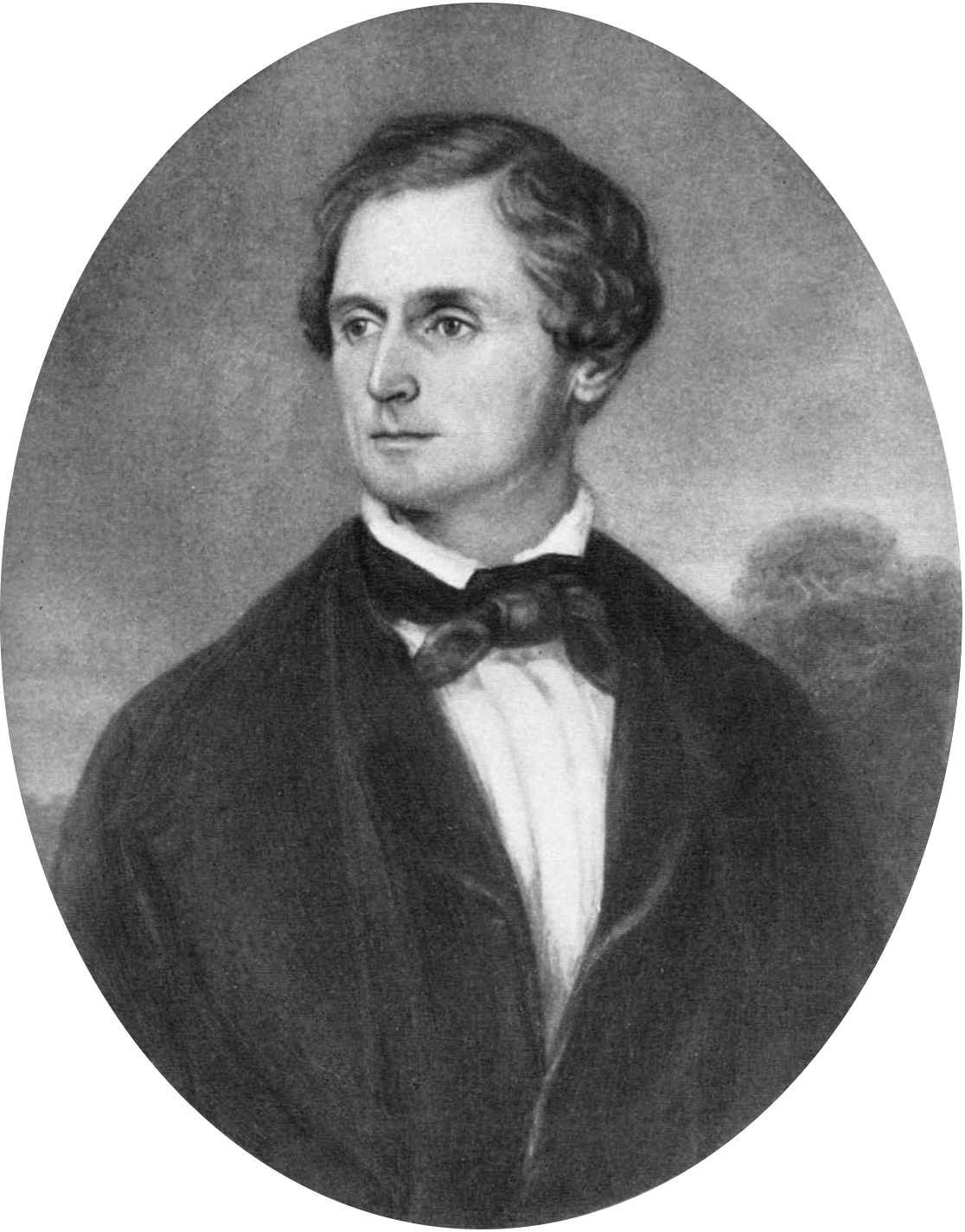
Miniature of Davis around age 32 (c. 1840)

Davis decided to become a cotton planter. He returned to Mississippi where his brother Joseph had developed Davis Bend into Hurricane Plantation, which eventually had 1,700 acres (690 ha) of cultivated fields with over 300 slaves. Joseph loaned him funds to buy ten slaves and provided him with 800 acres (320 ha), though Joseph retained the title to the property. Davis named his section Brierfield Plantation.

Davis continued his correspondence with Sarah, and they agreed to marry with Taylor giving his reluctant assent. They married at Beechland on June 17, 1835. In August, he and Sarah traveled to Locust Grove Plantation, his sister Anna Smith's home in West Feliciana Parish, Louisiana. Within days, both became severely ill with malaria. Sarah died at the age of 21 on September 15, 1835, after only three months of marriage.

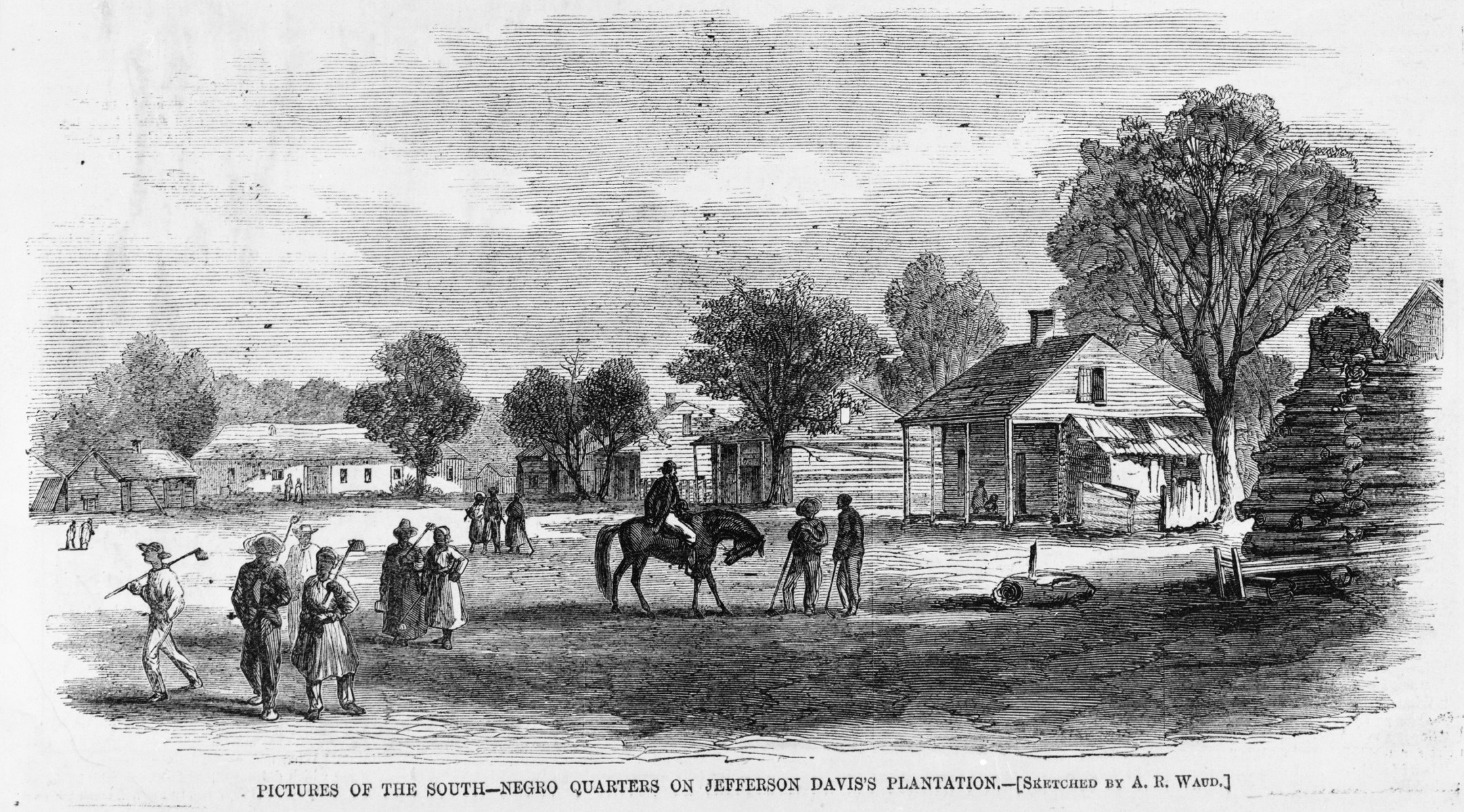
Slave cabins at Brierfield, etching by Alfred R. Waud for Harper's Weekly (1866)

For several years after Sarah's death, Davis spent much of his time developing Brierfield. In 1836, he possessed 23 slaves; by 1840, he possessed 40; and by 1860, 113. He made his first slave, James Pemberton, Brierfield's effective overseer, a position Pemberton held until his death around 1850. Davis continued his intellectual development by reading about politics, law and economics at the large library Joseph and his wife, Eliza, maintained at Hurricane Plantation. Around this time, Davis became increasingly engaged in politics, benefiting from his brother's mentorship and political influence.

== Early political career and second marriage ==
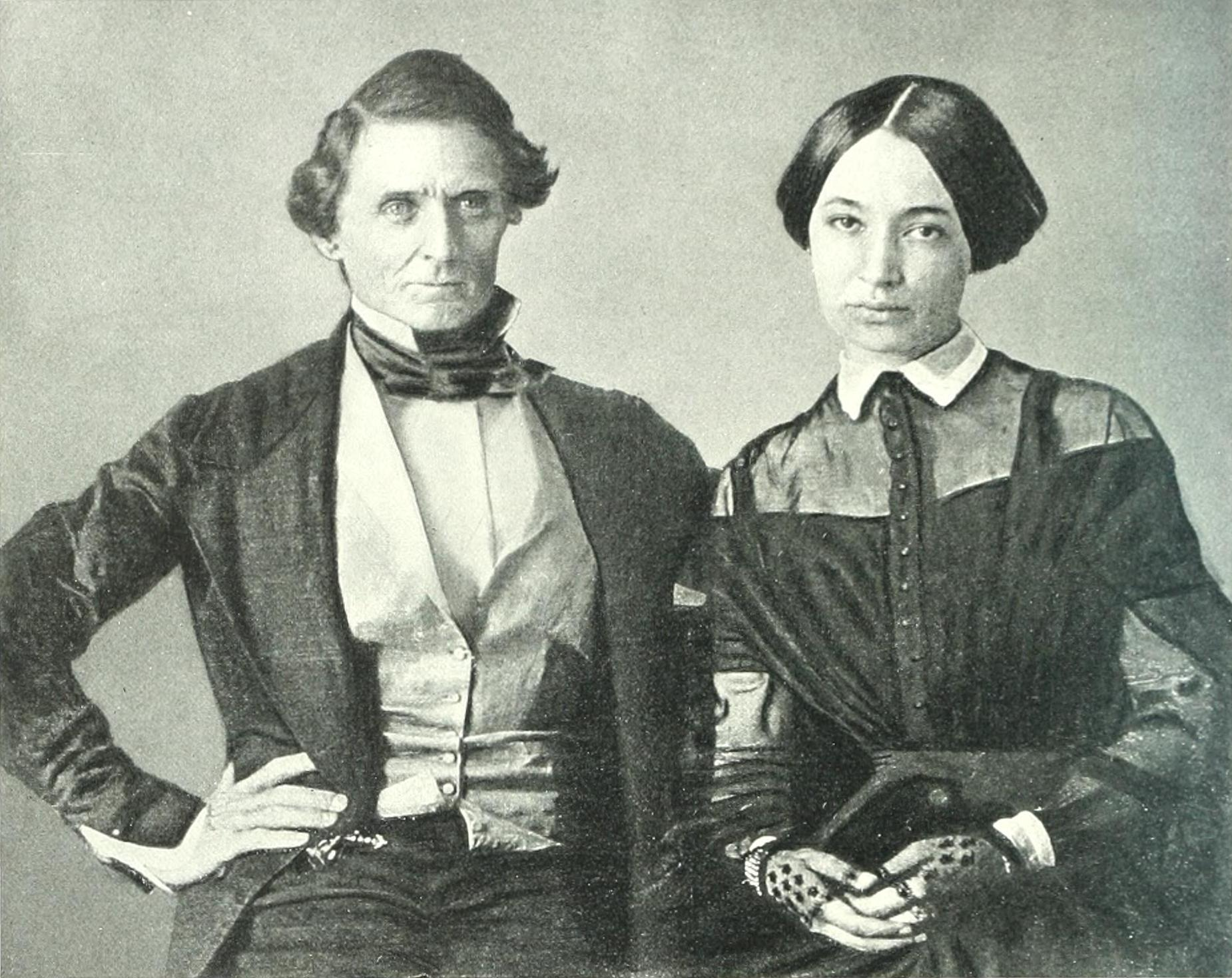
Daguerreotype wedding photograph of Jefferson Davis and Varina Howell (1845)

Davis became publicly involved in politics in 1840 when he attended a Democratic Party meeting in Vicksburg and served as a delegate to the party's state convention in Jackson; he served again in 1842. One week before the state election in November 1843, he was chosen to be the Democratic candidate for the Mississippi House of Representatives for Warren County when the original candidate withdrew his nomination, though Davis lost the election.

In early 1844, Davis was chosen to serve as a delegate to the state convention again. On his way to Jackson, he met Varina Banks Howell, the 18-year-old daughter of William Burr Howell and Margaret Kempe Howell, when he delivered an invitation from Joseph for her to visit the Hurricane Plantation for the Christmas season. At the convention, Davis was selected as one of Mississippi's six presidential electors for the 1844 presidential election.

Within a month of their meeting, 35-year-old Davis and Varina became engaged despite her parents' initial concerns about his age and politics. During the remainder of the year, Davis campaigned for the Democratic Party, advocating for the nomination of John C. Calhoun. He preferred Calhoun because he championed Southern interests including the annexation of Texas, reduction of tariffs, and building naval defenses in southern ports. When the party chose James K. Polk for their presidential candidate, Davis campaigned for him.

Davis and Varina married on February 26, 1845. They had six children: Samuel Emory, born in 1852, who died of an undiagnosed disease two years later; Margaret Howell, born in 1855, who married, raised a family and lived to be 54; Jefferson Davis Jr., born in 1857, who died of yellow fever at age 21; Joseph Evan, born 1859, who died from an accidental fall at age five; William Howell, born 1861, who died of diphtheria at age 10; and Varina Anne, born 1864, who remained single and lived to be 34.

In July 1845, Davis became a candidate for the United States House of Representatives. He ran on a platform emphasizing a strict constructionist view of the constitution, states' rights, tariff reductions, and opposition to a national bank. He won the election and entered the 29th Congress. Davis opposed using federal monies for internal improvements, which he believed would undermine the autonomy of the states. He supported the American annexation of Oregon, but through peaceful compromise with Britain. On May 11, 1846, he voted for war with Mexico.

== Mexican–American War ==
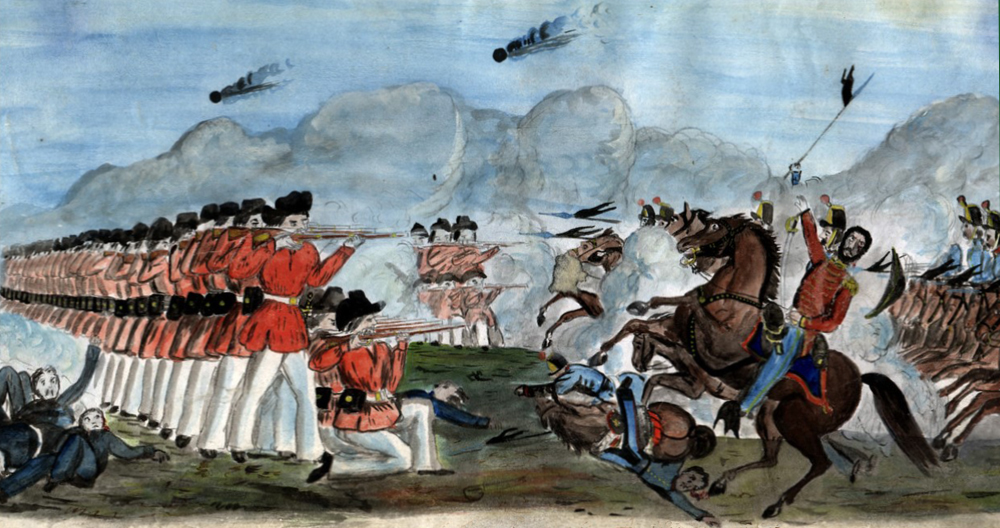
Watercolor of The Defeat of the Mexican Lancers by the Mississippi Rifles by Samuel Chamberlain (c. 1860)

At the beginning of the Mexican–American War, Mississippi raised a volunteer unit, the First Mississippi Regiment, for the U.S. Army. Davis expressed his interest in joining the regiment if he was elected its colonel, and in the second round of elections in June 1846 he was chosen. He did not give up his position as a U.S. Representative, but left a letter of resignation with his brother Joseph to submit when he thought it was appropriate.

Davis was able to get his regiment armed with new percussion rifles instead of the smoothbore muskets used by other units. President Polk approved their purchase as a political favor in return for Davis marshalling enough votes to pass the Walker Tariff. Because of its association with the regiment, the weapon became known as the "Mississippi rifle", and the regiment became known as the "Mississippi Rifles".

Davis's regiment was assigned to the army of his former father-in-law, Zachary Taylor, in northeastern Mexico. Davis distinguished himself at the Battle of Monterrey in September by leading a charge that took the fort of La Teneria. He then went on a two-month leave and returned to Mississippi, where he learned that Joseph had submitted Davis's resignation from the House of Representatives in October. Davis returned to Mexico and fought in the Battle of Buena Vista on February 22, 1847. He was wounded in the heel during the fighting, but his actions stopped an attack by the Mexican forces that threatened to collapse the American line. In May, Polk offered him a federal commission as a brigadier general. Davis declined the appointment, arguing he could not directly command militia units because the U.S. Constitution gives the power of appointing militia officers to the states, not the federal government. Instead, he accepted an appointment by Mississippi governor Albert G. Brown to fill a vacancy in the U.S. Senate left when Jesse Speight died.

== Senator and Secretary of War ==
=== Senator ===
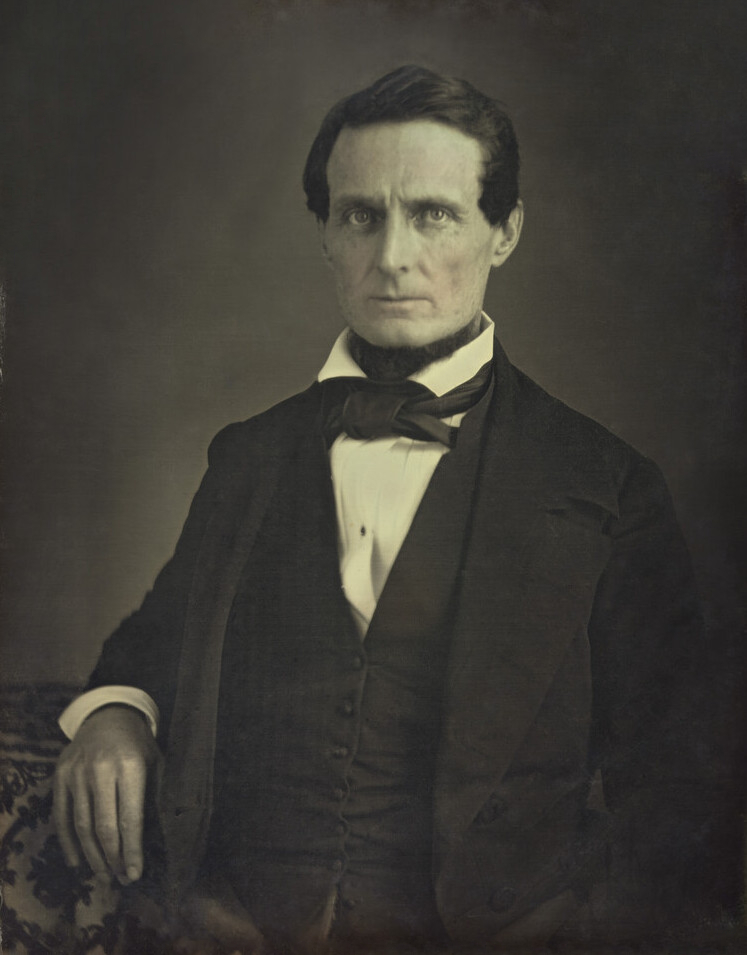
Daguerreotype of Representative Davis of the 29th U.S. Congress (c. 1846)

Davis took his seat in December 1847 and was made a regent of the Smithsonian Institution. The Mississippi Legislature confirmed his appointment as senator in January 1848. He quickly established himself as an advocate of expanding slavery into the Western territories. He argued that because the territories were the common property of all the United States and lacked state sovereignty to ban slavery, slave owners had the equal right to settle them as any other citizens. Davis tried to amend the Oregon Bill to allow settlers to bring their slaves into Oregon Territory. He opposed ratifying the Treaty of Guadalupe Hidalgo, which ended the Mexican–American War, claiming that Nicholas Trist, who negotiated the treaty, had done so as a private citizen and not a government representative. Instead, he advocated negotiating a new treaty ceding additional land to the United States, and opposed the application of the Wilmot Proviso to the treaty, which would have banned slavery in any territory acquired from Mexico.

During the 1848 presidential election, Davis chose not to campaign against Zachary Taylor, who was the Whig candidate. After the Senate session following Taylor's inauguration ended in March 1849, Davis returned to Brierfield Plantation. He was reelected by the state legislature for another six-year term in the Senate. Around this time, he was approached by the Venezuelan adventurer Narciso López to lead a filibuster expedition to liberate Cuba from Spain. He turned down the offer, saying it was inconsistent with his duty as a senator.

When Calhoun died in the spring of 1850, Davis became the senatorial spokesperson for the South. The Congress debated Henry Clay's resolutions, which sought to address the sectional and territorial problems of the nation and became the basis for the Compromise of 1850. Davis was against the resolutions because he felt they would put the South at a political disadvantage. He opposed the admission of California as a free state without its first becoming a territory, asserting that a territorial government would give slaveowners the opportunity to colonize the region. He also tried to extend the Missouri Compromise Line to allow slavery to expand to the Pacific Ocean. He stated that not allowing slavery into the new territories denied the political equality of Southerners, and threatened to undermine the balance of power between Northern and Southern states in the Senate.

In the autumn of 1851, Davis was nominated to run for governor of Mississippi against Henry Stuart Foote, who had favored the Compromise of 1850. He accepted the nomination and resigned from the Senate, but Foote won the election by a slim margin. Davis turned down a reappointment to his Senate seat by outgoing Governor James Whitfield, settling in Brierfield for the next fifteen months. He remained politically active, attending the Democratic convention in January 1852 and campaigning for Democratic candidates Franklin Pierce and William R. King during the presidential election of 1852.

=== Secretary of War ===
Map of the territory of the United States from the Mississippi to the Pacific Ocean; ordered by Jeff'n Davis, Secretary of War to accompany the reports of the explorations for a railroad route (1858)

In March 1853, President Franklin Pierce named Davis his Secretary of War. He championed a transcontinental railroad to the Pacific Ocean, arguing it was needed for national defense, and was entrusted with overseeing the Pacific Railroad Surveys to determine which of four possible routes was the best. He promoted the Gadsden Purchase of today's southern Arizona from Mexico, partly because he preferred a southern route for the new railroad. The Pierce administration agreed and the land was purchased in December 1853. He presented the surveys' findings in 1855, but they failed to clarify the best route and sectional problems prevented any choice being made. Davis also argued for the acquisition of Cuba from Spain, seeing it as an opportunity to add the island, a strategic military location and potential slave state. He suggested that the size of the regular army was too small and that its salaries were too meagre. Congress agreed and authorized four new regiments and increased its pay scale. He ended the manufacture of smoothbore muskets and shifted production to rifles, working to develop the tactics that accompany them. He oversaw the building of public works in Washington D.C., including the initial construction of the Washington Aqueduct.

Davis assisted in the passage of the Kansas–Nebraska Act in 1854 by allowing President Pierce to endorse it before it came up for a vote. This bill, which created Kansas and Nebraska territories, repealed the Missouri Compromise's limits on slavery and left the decision about a territory's slaveholding status to popular sovereignty, which allowed the territory's residents to decide. The passage of this bill led to the demise of the Whig party, which had tried to limit expansion of slavery in the territories. It also contributed to the rise of the Republican Party and the increase of civil violence in Kansas.

The Democratic nomination for the 1856 presidential election went to James Buchanan. Knowing his term was over when the Pierce administration ended in 1857, Davis ran for the Senate once more and re-entered it on March 4, 1857. In the same month, the United States Supreme Court decided the Dred Scott case, which ruled that slavery could not be barred from any territory.

=== Return to Senate ===
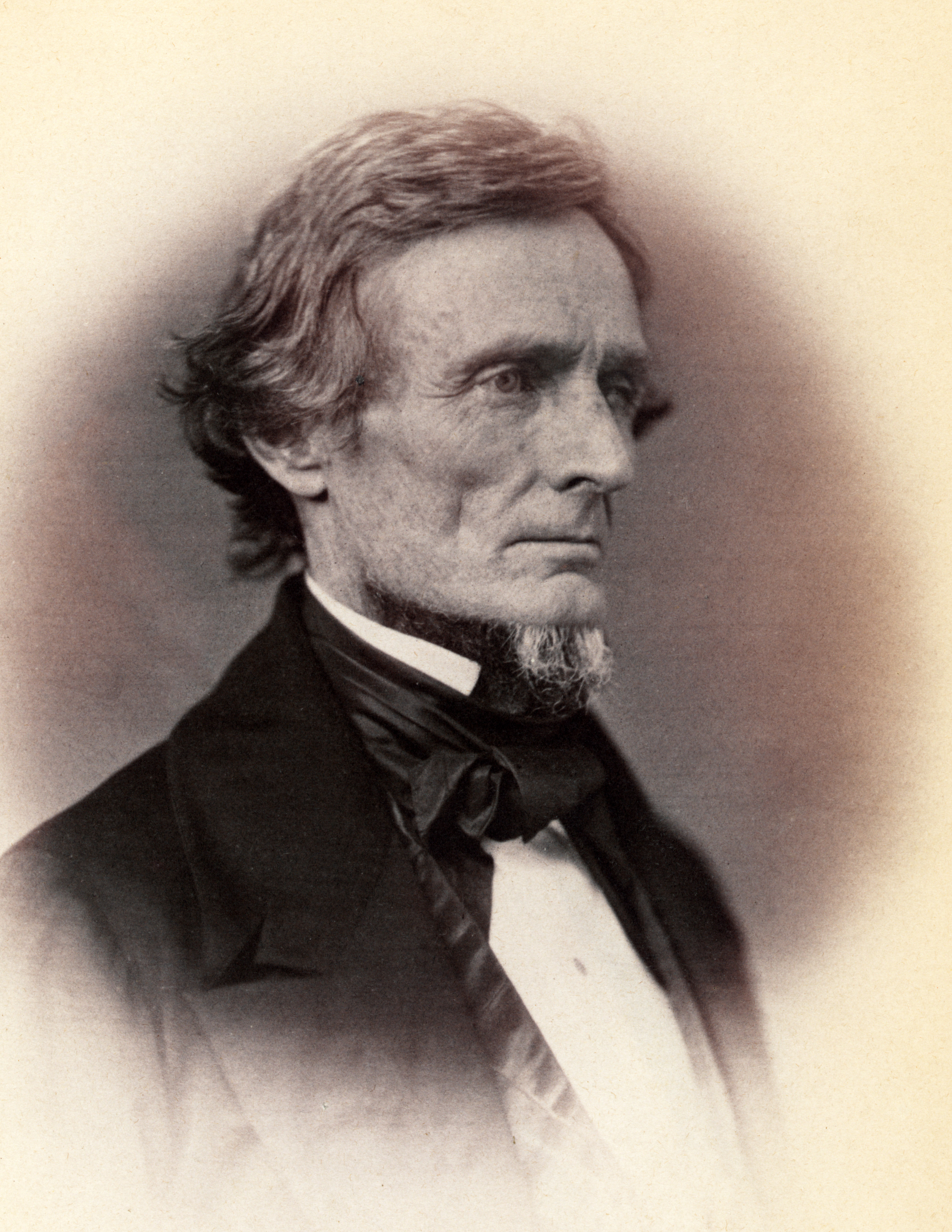
Photograph of Senator Davis of the 35th United States Congress by Julian Vannerson (1859)

The Senate recessed in March and did not reconvene until November 1857. The session opened with a debate on the Lecompton Constitution submitted by a convention in Kansas Territory. If approved, it would have allowed Kansas to be admitted as a slave state. Davis supported it, but it was not accepted, in part because the leading Democrat in the North, Stephen Douglas, argued it did not represent the true will of the settlers in the territory. The controversy undermined the alliance between Northern and Southern Democrats.

Davis's participation in the Senate was interrupted in early 1858 by a recurring case of iritis, which threatened the loss of his left eye. It left him bedridden for seven weeks. He spent the summer of 1858 in Portland, Maine recovering, and gave speeches in Maine, Boston, and New York, emphasizing the common heritage of all Americans and the importance of the constitution for defining the nation. His speeches angered some states' rights supporters in the South, requiring him to clarify his comments when he returned to Mississippi. Davis said that he appreciated the benefits of Union, but acknowledged that it could be dissolved if states' rights were violated or one section of the country imposed its will on another. Speaking to the Mississippi Legislature on November 16, 1858, Davis stated "if an Abolitionist be chosen President of the United States ... I should deem it your duty to provide for your safety outside of a Union with those who have already shown the will ...to deprive you of your birthright and to reduce you to worse than the colonial dependence of your fathers."

In February 1860, Davis presented a series of resolutions defining the relationship between the states under the constitution, including the assertion that Americans had a constitutional right to bring slaves into territories. These resolutions were seen as setting the agenda for the Democratic Party nomination, ensuring that Douglas's idea of popular sovereignty, known as the Freeport Doctrine, would be excluded from the party platform. The Democratic party split—Douglas was nominated by the North and Vice President John C. Breckinridge was nominated by the South—and the Republican Party nominee Abraham Lincoln won the 1860 presidential election. Davis counselled moderation after the election, but South Carolina adopted an ordinance of secession on December 20, 1860. Mississippi seceded on January 9, 1861, though Davis stayed in Washington until he received official notification on January 21. Calling it "the saddest day of his life", he delivered a farewell address, resigned from the Senate, and returned to Mississippi.

== President of the Confederate States ==
=== Inauguration ===
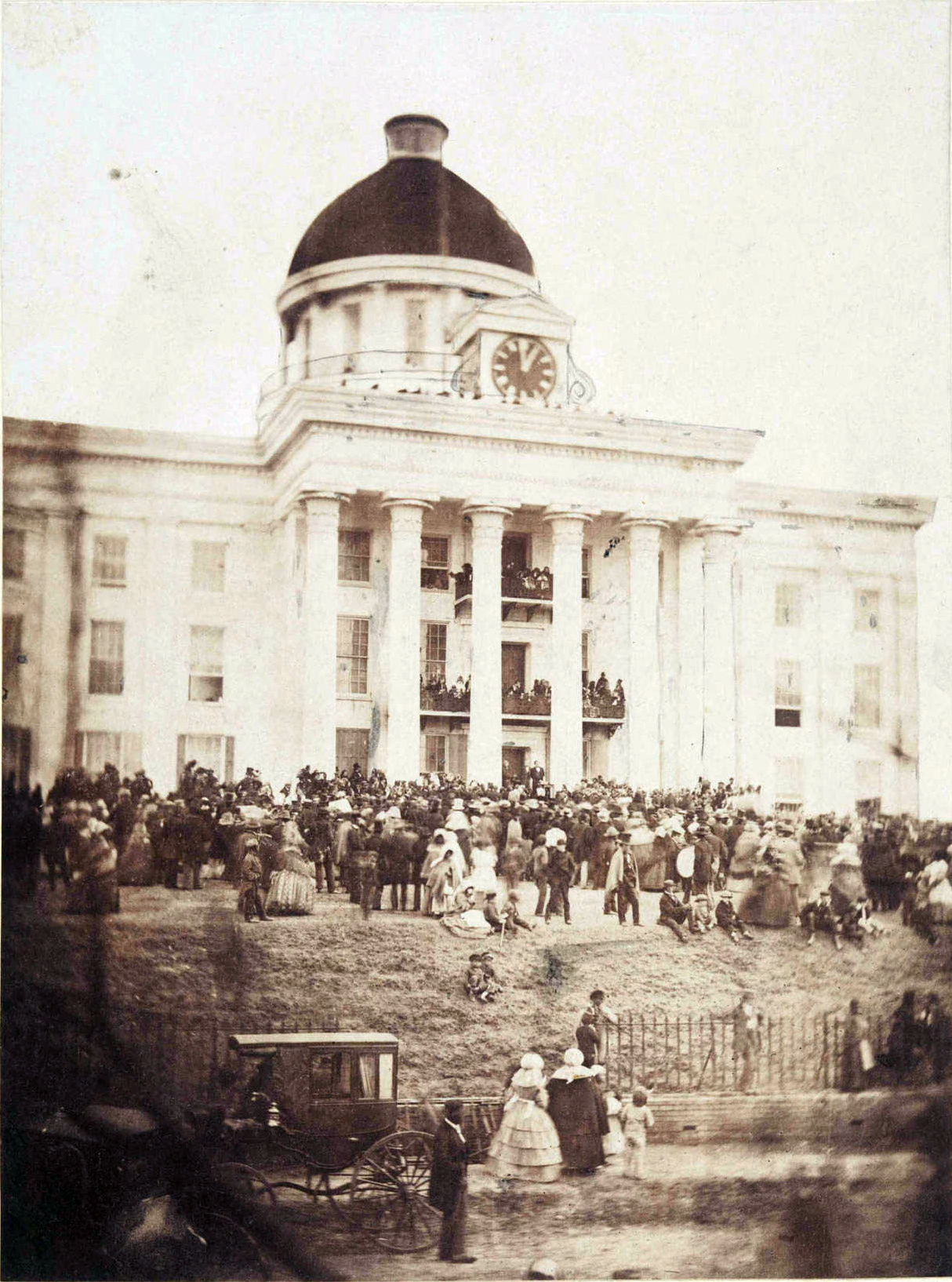
Photograph of inauguration of Davis as provisional President of the Confederate States of America in front of the Alabama State Capitol in Montgomery by A.C. Whitmore (February 18, 1861)

Before his resignation, Davis had sent a telegram to Mississippi Governor John J. Pettus informing him that he was available to serve the state. On January 27, 1861, Pettus appointed him a major general of Mississippi's army. On February 9, Davis was unanimously elected to the provisional presidency of the Confederacy by a constitutional convention in Montgomery, Alabama including delegates from the six states that had seceded: South Carolina, Mississippi, Florida, Georgia, Louisiana, and Alabama. He was chosen because of his political prominence, his military reputation, and his moderate approach to secession, which Confederate leaders thought might persuade undecided Southerners to support their cause. He learned about his election the next day. Davis had been hoping for a military command, but he committed himself fully to his new role. Davis was inaugurated on February 18.

Davis formed his cabinet by choosing a member from each of the states of the Confederacy, including Texas which had recently seceded: Robert Toombs of Georgia for Secretary of State, Christopher Memminger of South Carolina for Secretary of the Treasury, LeRoy Walker of Alabama for Secretary of War, John Reagan of Texas for Postmaster General, Judah P. Benjamin of Louisiana for Attorney General, and Stephen Mallory of Florida for Secretary of the Navy. Davis stood in for Mississippi. During his presidency, Davis's cabinet often changed; there were fourteen different appointees for the positions, including six secretaries of war. On November 6, 1861, Davis was elected president for a six-year term. He took office on February 22, 1862.

=== Civil War ===
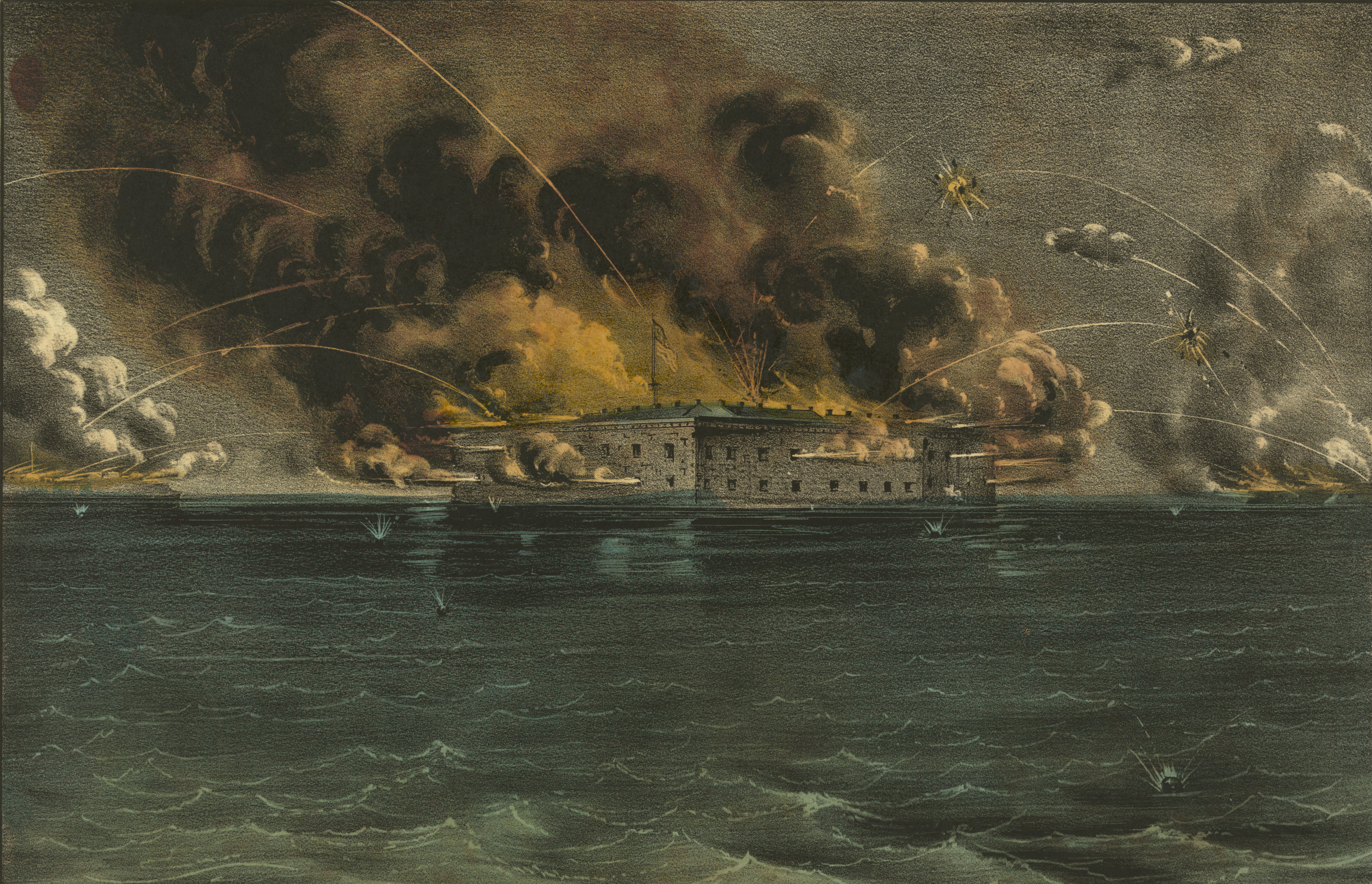
Colored lithograph of the Bombardment of Fort Sumter, Charleston Harbor by Currier and Ives (c. 1861)

As the Southern states seceded, state authorities took over most federal facilities without bloodshed. But four forts, including Fort Sumter in Charleston, South Carolina, had not surrendered. Davis preferred to avoid a crisis because the Confederacy needed time to organize its resources. To ensure that no attack on Fort Sumter was launched without his command, Davis had appointed Brigadier General P. G. T. Beauregard to command all Confederate troops in the vicinity of Charleston, South Carolina. Davis sent a commission to Washington to negotiate the evacuation of the forts, but President of the United States Lincoln refused to meet with it.

When Lincoln informed Davis that he intended to reprovision Fort Sumter, Davis convened with the Confederate Congress on April 8 and gave orders to demand the immediate surrender of the fort or to capture it by force. The commander of the fort, Major Robert Anderson, refused to surrender, and Beauregard began the attack on Fort Sumter early on April 12. After over thirty hours of bombardment, the fort surrendered. When Lincoln called for 75,000 militiamen to suppress the rebellion, four more states—Virginia, North Carolina, Tennessee, and Arkansas—joined the Confederacy. The Civil War had begun.

==== 1861 ====
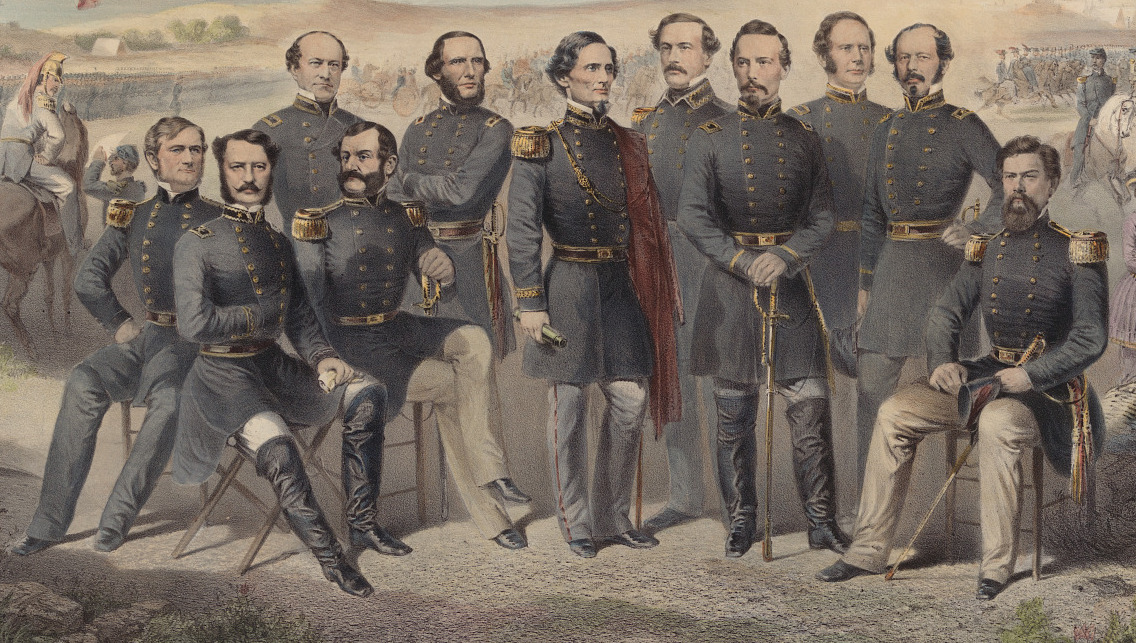
Colored lithograph of Davis and his generals by Goupil (1861) (Note: From left to right: Leonidas Polk, John B. Magruder, General Simmons, George N. Hollins, Benjamin McCulloch, Davis, Robert E. Lee, P. G. T. Beauregard, Sterling Price, Joseph E. Johnston and William J. Hardee)

In addition to being the constitutional commander-in-chief of the Confederacy, Davis was operational military leader as the military departments reported directly to him. He left the directing of the fighting to his generals, some of whom, including Joseph E. Johnston and Leonidas Polk, had thought he would do it himself.

Major fighting in the East began when a Union army advanced into northern Virginia in July 1861. It was defeated at Manassas by two Confederate forces commanded by Beauregard and Joseph Johnston. After the battle, Davis had to manage disputes with the two generals, both of whom felt they did not get the recognition they deserved.

In the West, Davis had to address a problem caused by another general. Kentucky, which was leaning toward the Confederacy, had declared its neutrality. In September 1861, Polk violated the state's neutrality by occupying Columbus, Kentucky. Secretary of War Walker ordered him to withdraw. Davis initially agreed with Walker, but changed his mind and allowed Polk to remain. The violation led Kentucky to request aid from the Union, effectively losing the state for the Confederacy. Walker resigned as secretary of war and was replaced by Judah P. Benjamin. Davis appointed General Albert Sidney Johnston, as commander of the Western Military Department, which included much of Tennessee, Kentucky, western Mississippi, and Arkansas.

==== 1862 ====
In February 1862, the Confederate defenses in the West collapsed when Union forces captured Forts Henry and Donelson, and nearly half the troops in A. S. Johnston's department. Within weeks, Kentucky, Nashville and Memphis were lost, as well as control of the Tennessee and Cumberland Rivers. The commanders responsible for the defeat were Brigadier Generals Gideon Pillow and John B. Floyd, political generals that Davis had been required to appoint. Davis gathered troops defending the Gulf Coast and concentrated them with A. S. Johnston's remaining forces. Davis favored using this concentration in an offensive. Johnston attacked the Union forces at Shiloh in southwestern Tennessee on April 6. The attack failed, and Johnston was killed. General Beauregard took command, falling back to Corinth, Mississippi, and then to Tupelo, Mississippi. When Beauregard then put himself on leave, Davis replaced him with General Braxton Bragg.

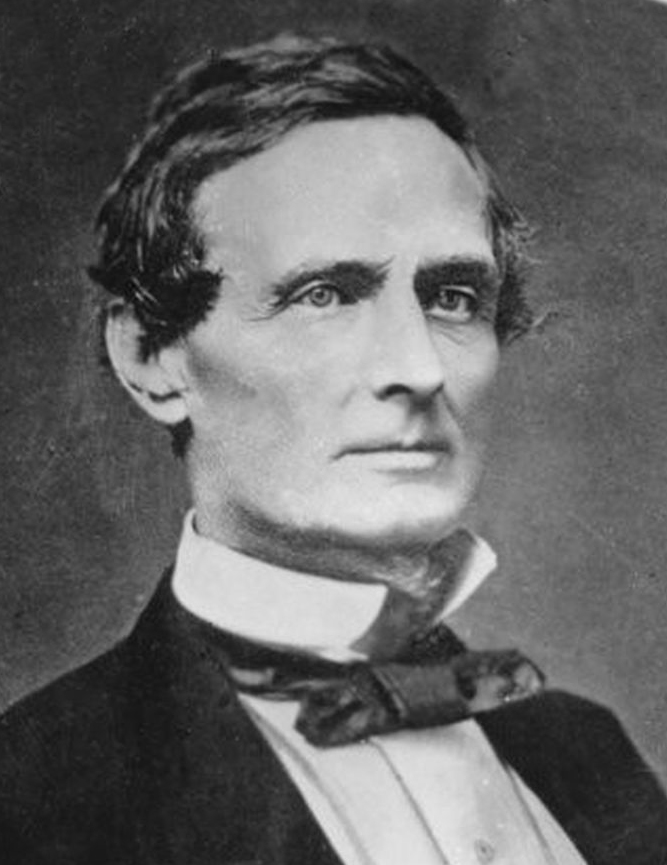
Photograph of Davis as President of the Confederate States of America, 1862

On February 22, Davis was inaugurated as president. In his inaugural address, he admitted that the South had suffered disasters, but called on the people of the Confederacy to renew their commitment. He replaced Secretary of War Benjamin, who had been scapegoated for the defeats, with George W. Randolph. Davis kept Benjamin in the cabinet, making him secretary of state to replace Hunter, who had stepped down. In March, Davis vetoed a bill to create a commander in chief for the army, but he selected General Robert E. Lee to be his military advisor. They formed a close relationship, and Davis relied on Lee for counsel until the end of the war.

In March, Union troops in the East began an amphibious attack on the Virginia Peninsula, 75 miles from the Confederate capital of Richmond. Davis and Lee wanted Joseph Johnston, who commanded the Confederate army near Richmond, to make a stand at Yorktown. Instead, Johnston withdrew from the peninsula without informing Davis. Davis reminded Johnston that it was his duty to not let Richmond fall. On May 31, 1862, Johnston engaged the Union army less than ten miles from Richmond at the Battle of Seven Pines, where he was wounded. Davis put Lee in command. Lee began the Seven Days Battles less than a month later, pushing the Union forces back down the peninsula and eventually forcing them to withdraw from Virginia. Lee beat back another army moving into Virginia at the Battle of Second Manassas in August 1862. Knowing Davis desired an offensive into the North, Lee invaded Maryland, but retreated back to Virginia after a bloody stalemate at Antietam in September. In December, Lee stopped another invasion of Virginia at the Battle of Fredericksburg.

In the West, Bragg shifted most of his available forces from Tupelo to Chattanooga in July 1862 for an offensive toward Kentucky. Davis approved, suggesting that an attack could win Kentucky for the Confederacy and regain Tennessee, but he did not create a unified command. He formed a new department independent of Bragg under Major General Edmund Kirby Smith at Knoxville, Tennessee. In August, both Bragg and Smith invaded Kentucky. Frankfort was briefly captured and a Confederate governor was inaugurated, but the attack collapsed, in part due to lack of coordination between the two generals. After a stalemate at the Battle of Perryville, Bragg and Smith retreated to Tennessee. In December, Bragg was defeated at the Battle of Stones River.

In response to the defeat and the lack of coordination, Davis reorganized the command in the West in November, combining the armies in Tennessee and Vicksburg into a department under the overall command of Joseph Johnston. Davis expected Johnston to relieve Bragg of his command, but Johnston refused. During this time, Secretary of War Randolph resigned because he felt Davis refused to give him the autonomy to do his job; Davis replaced him with James Seddon.

In the winter of 1862, Davis decided to join the Episcopal Church. In May 1863, he was confirmed at St. Paul's Episcopal Church in Richmond.

==== 1863 ====
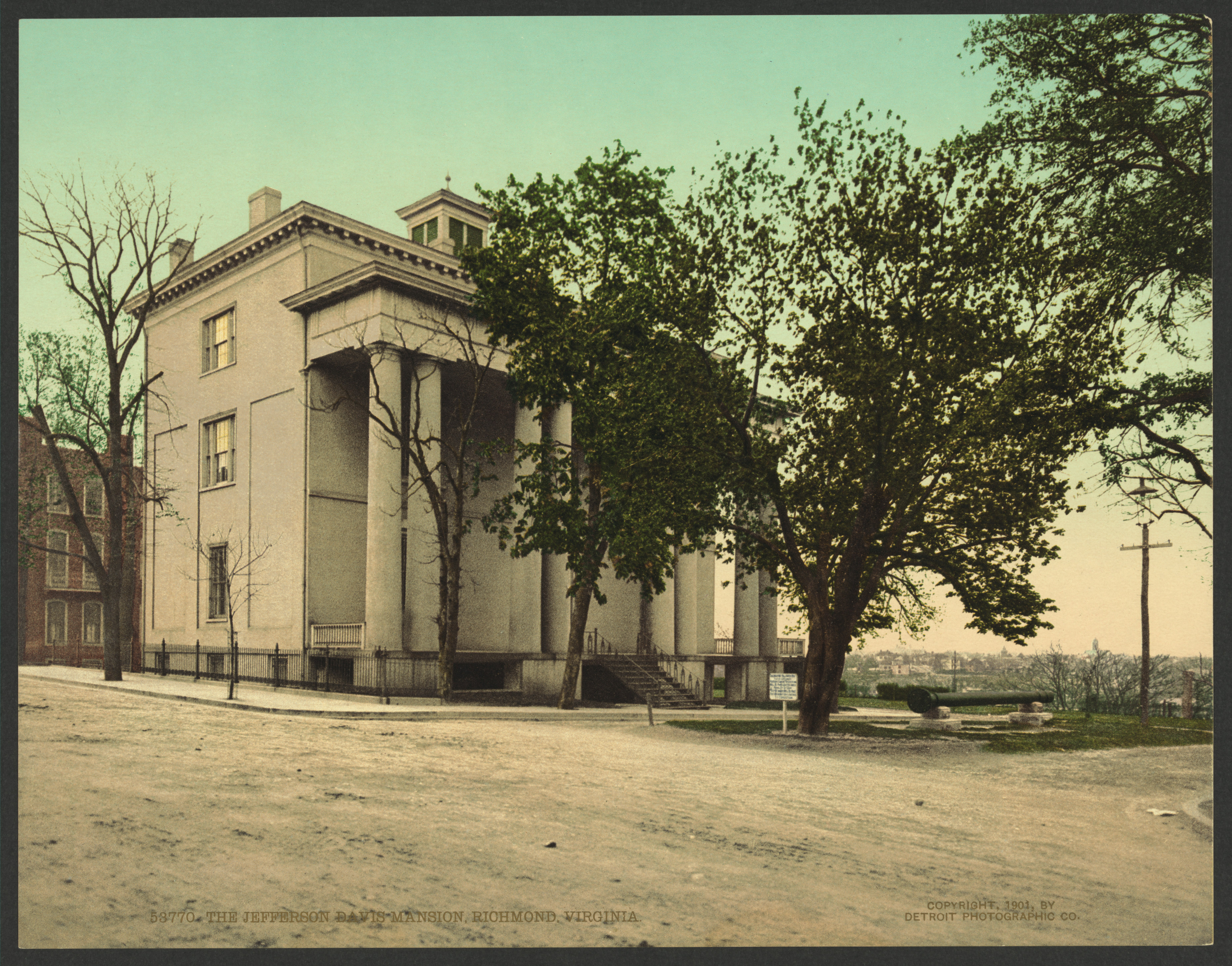
Colorized photograph of the White House of the Confederacy (Jefferson Davis's Executive Mansion) in Richmond (1901)

On January 1, Lincoln issued the Emancipation Proclamation. Davis saw this as attempt to destroy the South by inciting its enslaved people to revolt, declaring the proclamation "the most execrable measure recorded in the history of guilty man". He requested a law that Union officers captured in Confederate states be delivered to state authorities and put on trial for inciting slave rebellion. In response, the Congress passed a law that Union officers of United States Colored Troops could be tried and executed, though none were during the war. The law also stated that captured black soldiers would be turned over to the states they were captured in to be dealt with as the state saw fit.

In May, Lee broke up another invasion of Virginia at the Battle of Chancellorsville, and countered with an invasion into Pennsylvania. Davis approved, thinking that a victory in Union territory could gain recognition of Confederate independence, but Lee's army was defeated at the Battle of Gettysburg in July. After retreating to Virginia, Lee blocked any major Union offensives into the state.

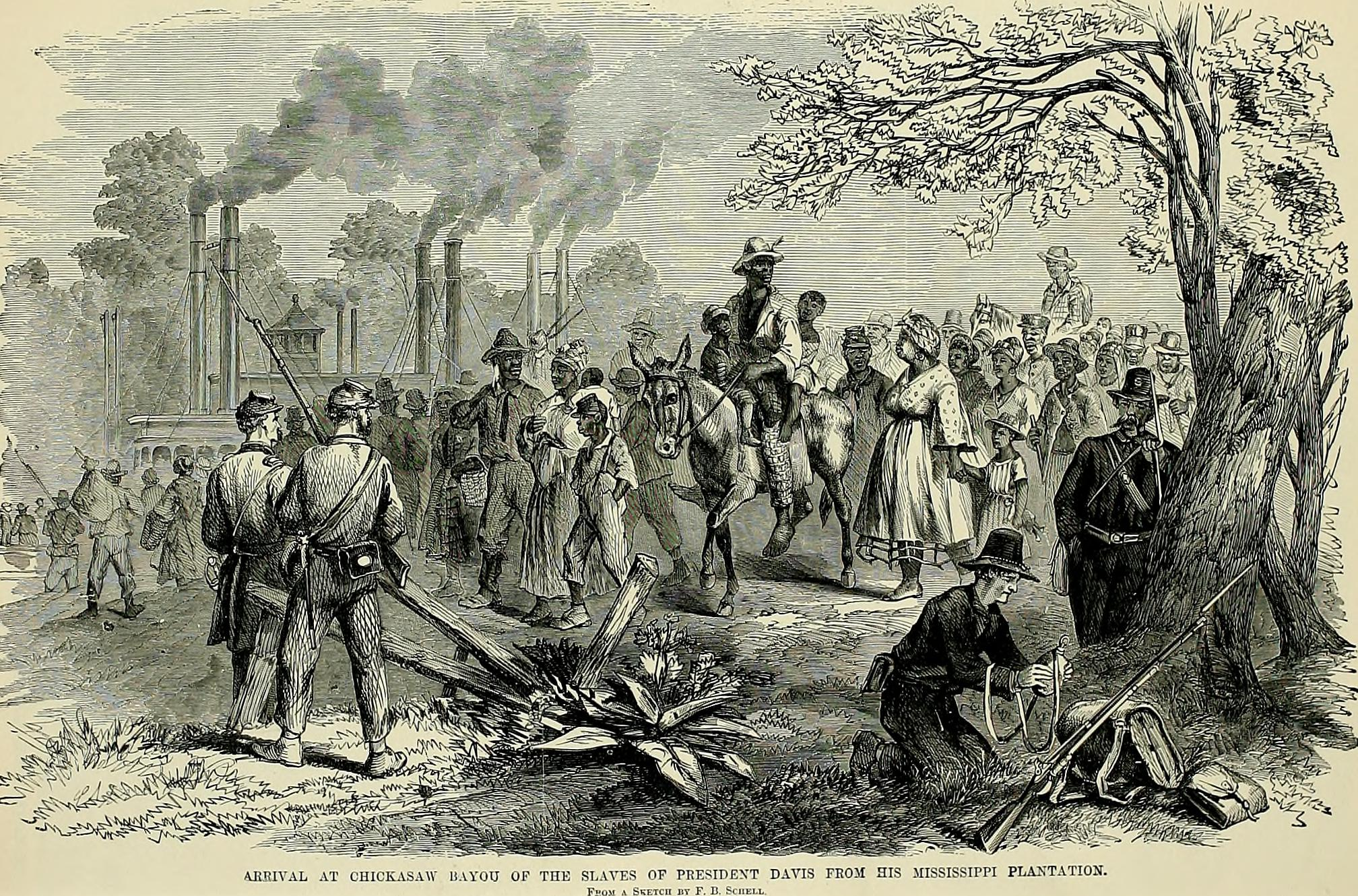
Arrival at Chickasaw Bayou of the Slaves of President Davis from His Mississippi Plantation. A woodcut adaptation of a sketch by Francis H. Schell (1863)

In April, Union forces resumed their attack on Vicksburg. Davis concentrated troops from across the south to counter the move, but Joseph Johnston did not stop the Union forces. Lieutenant General John C. Pemberton withdrew his army into Vicksburg, and after a siege, surrendered on July 4. The loss of Vicksburg and Port Hudson, Louisiana, led to Union control of the Mississippi. Davis relieved Johnston of his department command. During this time, Brierfield was occupied; Davis's slaves gained their freedom, and almost all of his property was confiscated or destroyed.

In the summer, Bragg's army was maneuvered out of Chattanooga and fell back to Georgia. In September, Bragg defeated the Union army at the Battle of Chickamauga, driving it back to Chattanooga, which he put under siege. Davis visited Bragg to address leadership problems in his army. Davis acknowledged that Bragg did not have the confidence of his subordinates but kept him in command. In mid-November, the Union army counterattacked and Bragg's forces retreated to northern Georgia. Bragg resigned his command; Davis replaced him with Joseph Johnston but retained Bragg as an informal chief of staff. Davis had to address faltering civilian morale. In early spring, there were riots in Confederate cities as people began to suffer food shortages and price inflation. During one riot in Richmond, the mayor of Richmond called the militia when a mob protesting food shortages broke into shops. Davis went to the scene and addressed the protesters, reminding them of their patriotic duty and promising them that he would get food. He then ordered them to disperse or he would command the soldiers to open fire; they dispersed. In October, Davis went on a month-long journey to rally the Confederacy, giving public speeches across the south and meeting with civic and military leaders.

==== 1864–1865 ====
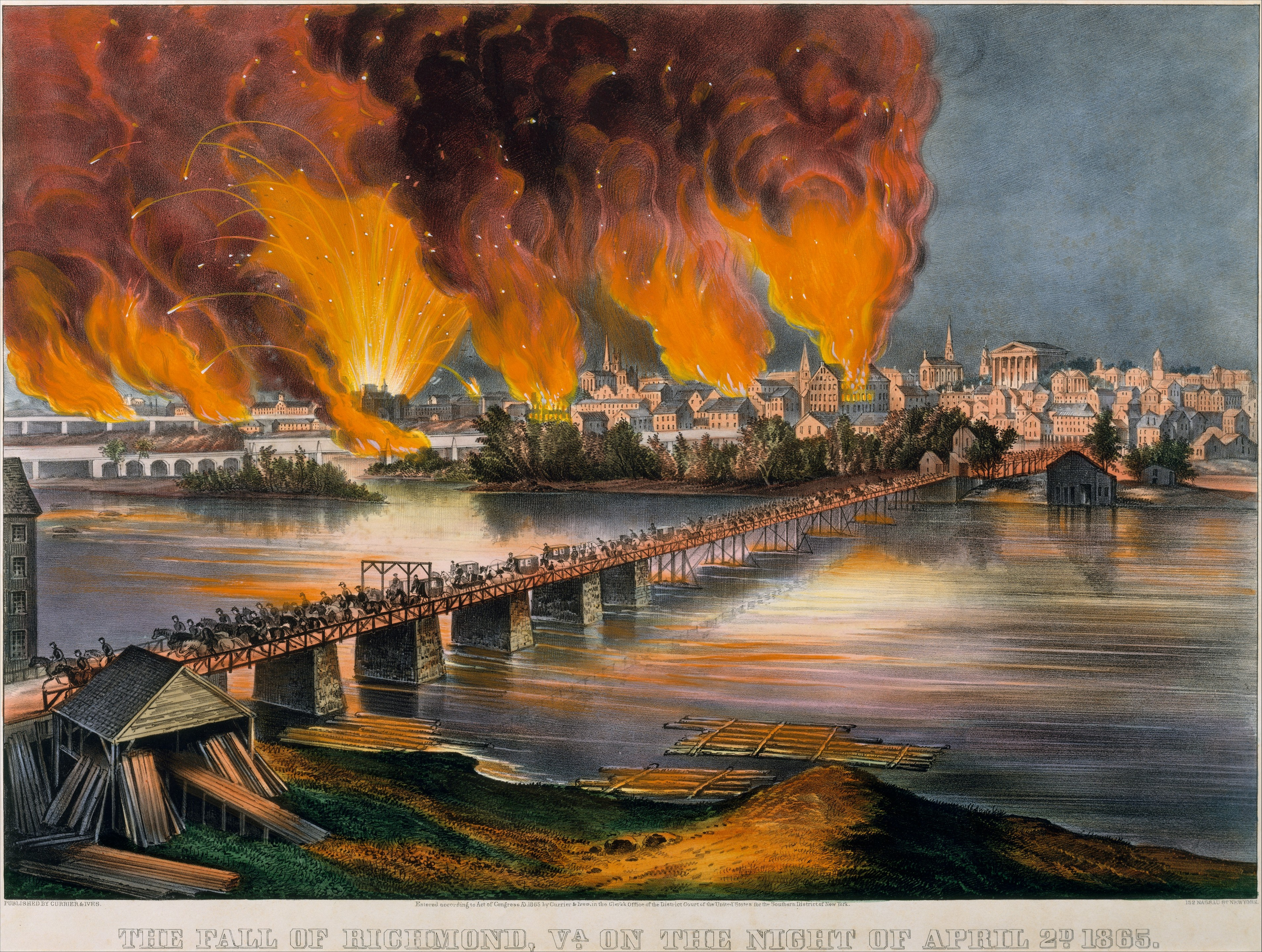
Colored lithograph of the fall of Richmond by Currier and Ives (c. 1865)

In his address to the Second Confederate Congress on May 2, 1864, Davis outlined his strategy of achieving Confederate independence by exhausting the Union will to fight: If the South could show it could not be subjugated, the North would elect a president who would make peace.

In early 1864, Davis encouraged Joseph E. Johnston to take action in Tennessee, but Johnston refused. In May, the Union armies advanced toward Johnston's army, which repeatedly retreated toward Atlanta, Georgia. In July, Davis replaced Johnston with General John B. Hood, who immediately engaged the Union forces in a series of battles around Atlanta. The battles did not stop the Union army and Hood abandoned the city on September 2. The victory raised Northern morale and assured Lincoln's reelection. The Union forces then marched to Savannah, Georgia, capturing it. In December, they advanced into South Carolina, forcing the Confederates to evacuate Charleston. In the meantime, Hood advanced north and was repulsed in a drive toward Nashville in December 1864.

Union forces began a new advance into northern Virginia. Lee put up a strong defense and they were unable to directly advance on Richmond, but managed to cross the James River. In June 1864, Lee fought the Union armies to a standstill; both sides settled into trench warfare around Petersburg, which would continue for nine months.

Davis signed a Congressional resolution in February making Lee general-in-chief. Seddon resigned as Secretary of War and was replaced by John C. Breckinridge. Davis sent envoys to Hampton Roads for peace talks, but Lincoln refused to consider any offer that included an independent Confederacy. Davis also sent Duncan F. Kenner, the chief Confederate diplomat, on a mission to Great Britain and France, offering to gradually emancipate the enslaved people of the South for diplomatic recognition.

Major General Patrick Cleburne sent a proposal in early 1864 to Davis to enlist African Americans in the army. Davis initially suppressed it, but by the end of the year, he reconsidered and endorsed the idea. Congress passed an act supporting him. It left the principle of slavery intact by leaving it to the states and individual owners to decide which slaves could be used for military service, but Davis's administration accepted only African Americans who had been freed by their masters as a condition of their being enlisted. The act came too late to have an effect on the war.

==== End of the Confederacy and capture ====
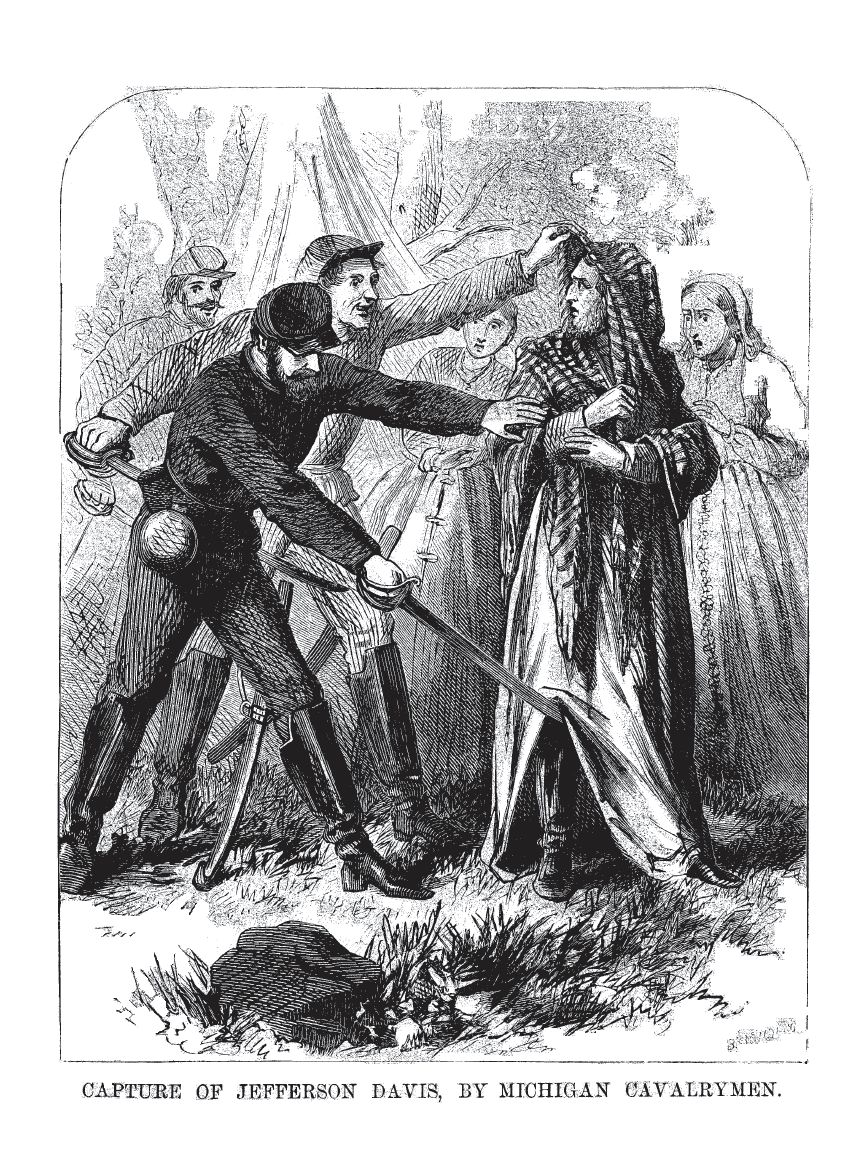
Illustration of the capture of Davis by John Barber and Henry Howe (1865)

The Union army broke through the Confederate trench lines at the end of March 1865, forcing Lee to withdraw and abandon Richmond, Virginia. Davis evacuated his family, which included Jim Limber, a free black orphan they briefly adopted, on March 29. On April 2, Davis and his cabinet escaped by rail to Danville, Virginia. He issued a proclamation on April 4, encouraging the people of the Confederacy to continue resistance, but Lee surrendered at Appomattox Courthouse on April 9. The president and his cabinet headed to Greensboro, North Carolina where they met with Joseph Johnston, Beauregard, and North Carolina Governor Zebulon Vance. Davis wanted to cross the Mississippi River and continue the war, but his generals stated that they did not have the forces. He gave Johnston authorization to negotiate the surrender of his army, but Davis headed south to carry on the fight.

When Lincoln was assassinated on April 14, the Union government implicated Davis, and a bounty of $100,000 (equivalent to $2,100,000 in 2025) was put on his head. On May 2, Davis met with Secretary of War Breckinridge and Bragg in Abbeville, South Carolina, to see if they could pull together an army. They said they could not. On May 5, he met with the remainder of his cabinet in Washington, Georgia, and officially dissolved the Confederate government. He moved on, hoping to join Kirby Smith's army across the Mississippi. On May 9, Union soldiers found Davis's encampment near Irwinville, Georgia. He tried to evade them, but was captured wearing a loose-sleeved cloak and covering his head with a black shawl, which gave rise to depictions of him in political cartoons fleeing in women's clothes.

=== Civil War policies ===
==== National policy ====
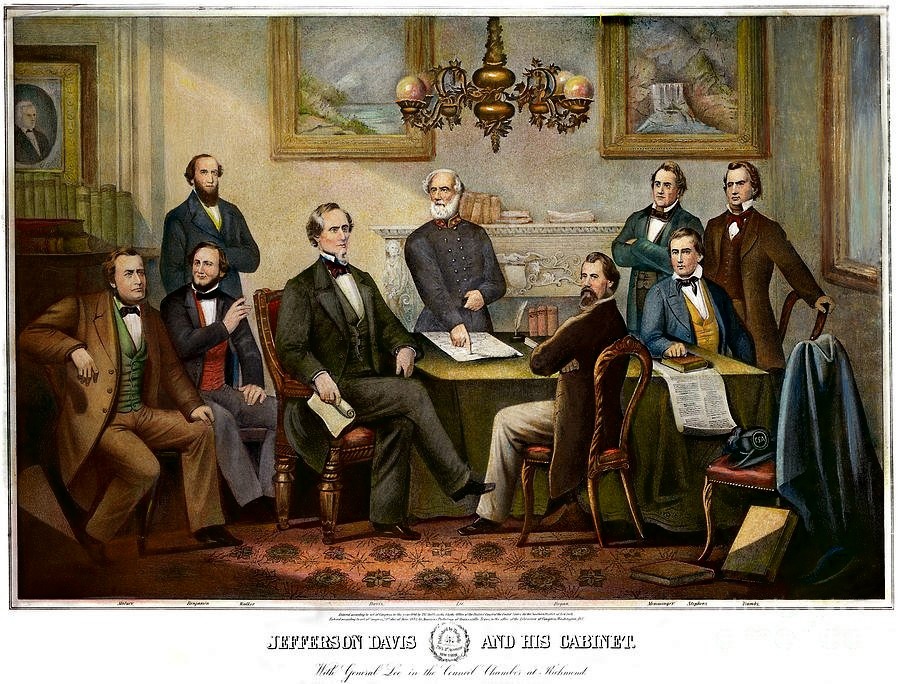
Colorized print of Jefferson Davis and his first cabinet with General Robert E. Lee, published by Thomas Kelly (1897) (Note: From left to right: Stephen Mallory, Judah P. Benjamin, LeRoy Pope Walker, Jefferson Davis, Robert E. Lee, John H. Reagan, Christopher Memminger, Alexander H. Stephens, and Robert Toombs)

Davis's central concern during the war was to achieve Confederate independence. After Virginia seceded, the provisional government of the Confederacy moved the capital to Richmond. The Confederate federal government had almost no institutional structures in place, lacking an army, navy, treasury, diplomatic missions, and bureaucracy. Davis had to work with the Confederate Congress quickly to create them.

Though Davis supported states' rights, he believed the Confederate constitution empowered him with the right to centralize authority to prosecute the war. He worked with the Congress to bring military facilities in the South, which had been controlled by the states, under Confederate authority. Confederate governors wanted their states' militia available for local defense. Davis knew he needed to deploy military forces to defend the Confederacy as a whole and created a centralized army that could enlist volunteers directly. When soldiers in the volunteer army seemed unwilling to re-enlist in 1862, Davis instituted the first conscription in American history. He received authorization from Congress to suspend the writ of habeas corpus when needed. In 1864, he challenged property rights by recommending a direct 5% tax on land and slaves, and implemented the impressment of supplies and slave labor for the military effort. In 1865, Davis's commitment to independence led him to even compromise slavery when he advocated for allowing African Americans to earn their freedom by serving in the military. These policies made him unpopular with states' rights advocates and state governors, who saw him as creating the same kind of government they had seceded from.

==== Foreign policy ====
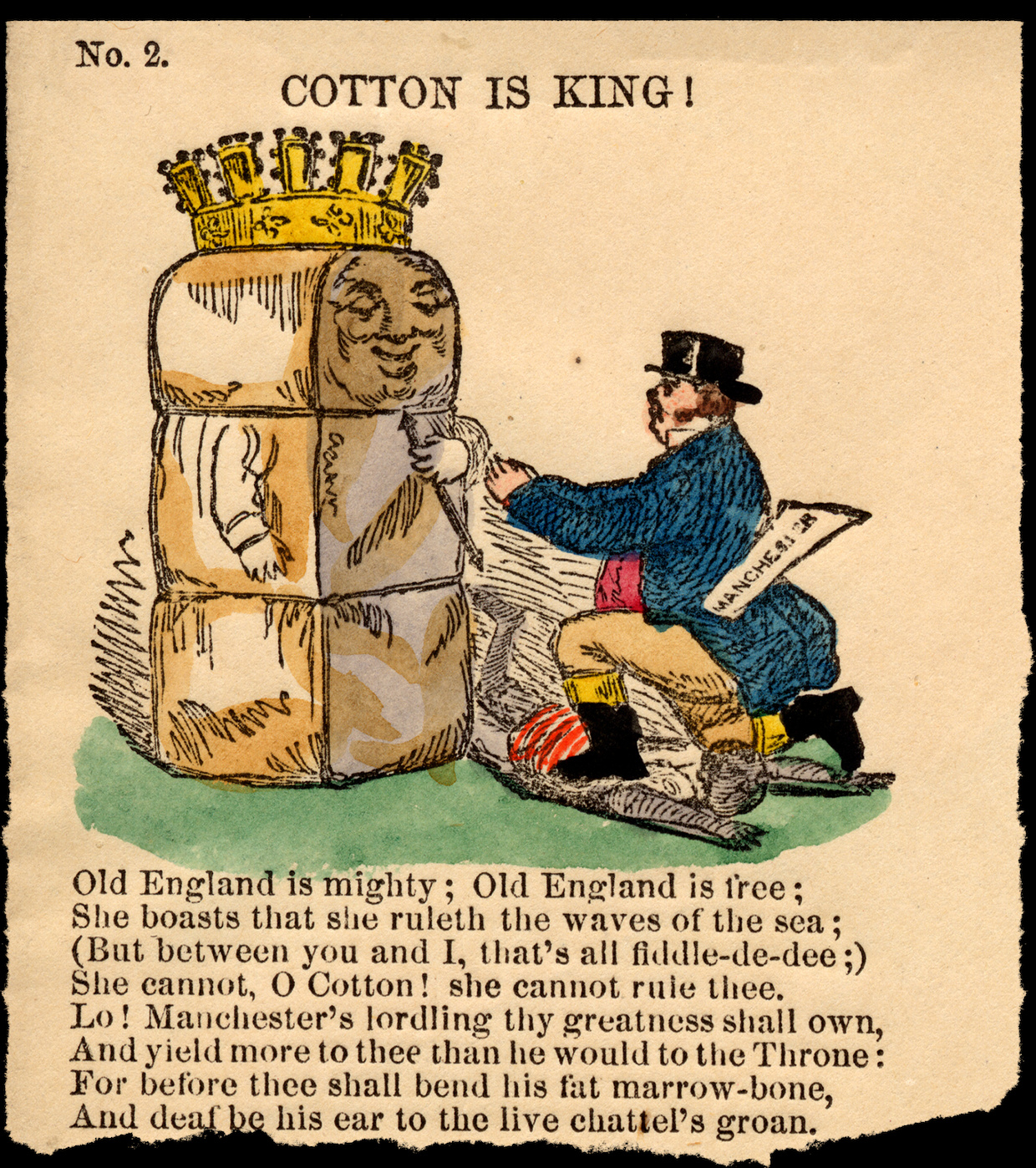
An 1861 American political cartoon depicting John Bull kneeling on a Black slave before King Cotton, accompanied by a poem mocking Britain's dependence on Southern cotton

The main objective of Davis's foreign policy was to achieve foreign recognition, allowing the Confederacy to secure international loans, receive foreign aid to open trade, and provide the possibility of a military alliance. Davis was confident that most European nations' economic dependence on cotton from the South would quickly convince them to sign treaties with the Confederacy. Cotton had made up 61% of the value of all U.S. exports and the South filled most of the European cloth industry's need for cheap imported raw cotton.

There was no consensus on how to use cotton to gain European support. Davis did not want an embargo on cotton, he wanted to make cotton available to European nations, but require them to acquire it by violating the blockade declared by the Union. The majority of Congress wanted an embargo to coerce Europe to help the South. Though there was no official policy, cotton was effectively embargoed. By 1862, the price of cotton in Europe had quadrupled and European imports of cotton from the United States were down 96%, but instead of joining with the Confederacy, European textile manufacturers found new sources, such as India, Egypt and Brazil. By the end of the war, not a single foreign nation had recognized the Confederate States of America.

==== Financial policy ====
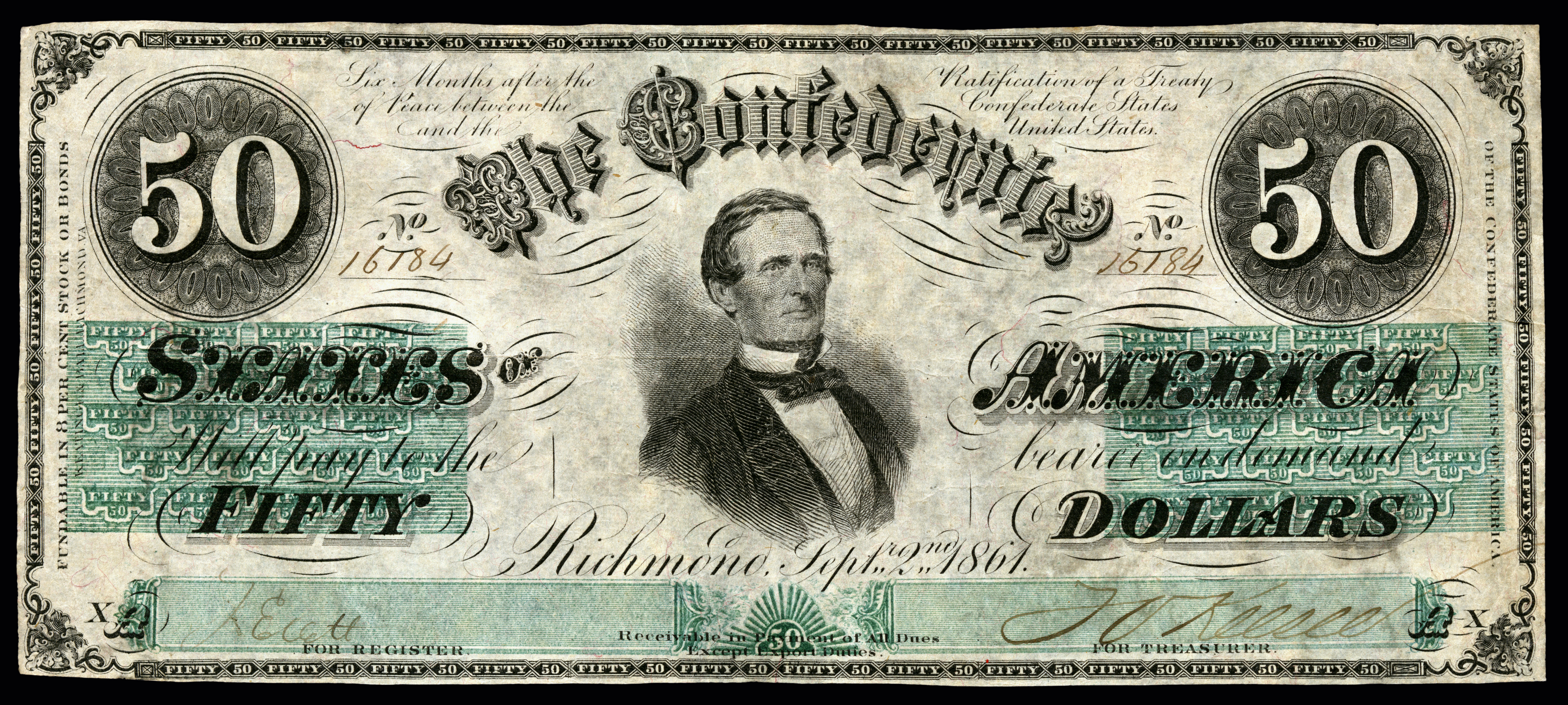
Davis $50 Confederate States treasury note issued between April and December 1862

Davis did not take executive action to create the needed financial structure for the Confederacy. He knew very little about public finance, largely deferring to Secretary of the Treasury Memminger. Memminger's knowledge of economics was limited, and he was ineffective at getting Congress to listen to his suggestions. Until 1863, Davis's reports on the financial state of the Confederacy to Congress tended to be unduly optimistic.

Davis's failure to argue for needed financial reform allowed Congress to avoid unpopular economic measures, such as taxing planters' property—both land and slaves—that made up two-thirds of the South's wealth. At first the government thought it could raise money with a low export tax on cotton, but the blockade prevented this. In his opening address to the fourth session of Congress in December 1863, Davis demanded the Congress pass a direct tax on property despite the constitution. Congress complied, but the tax had too many loopholes and exceptions, and failed to produce the needed revenue. Throughout the existence of the Confederacy, taxes accounted for only one-fourteenth of the government's income; consequently, the government printed money to fund the war, destroying the value of the Confederate currency. By 1865, the government was relying on impressments to fill the gaps caused by lack of finances.

== Imprisonment ==
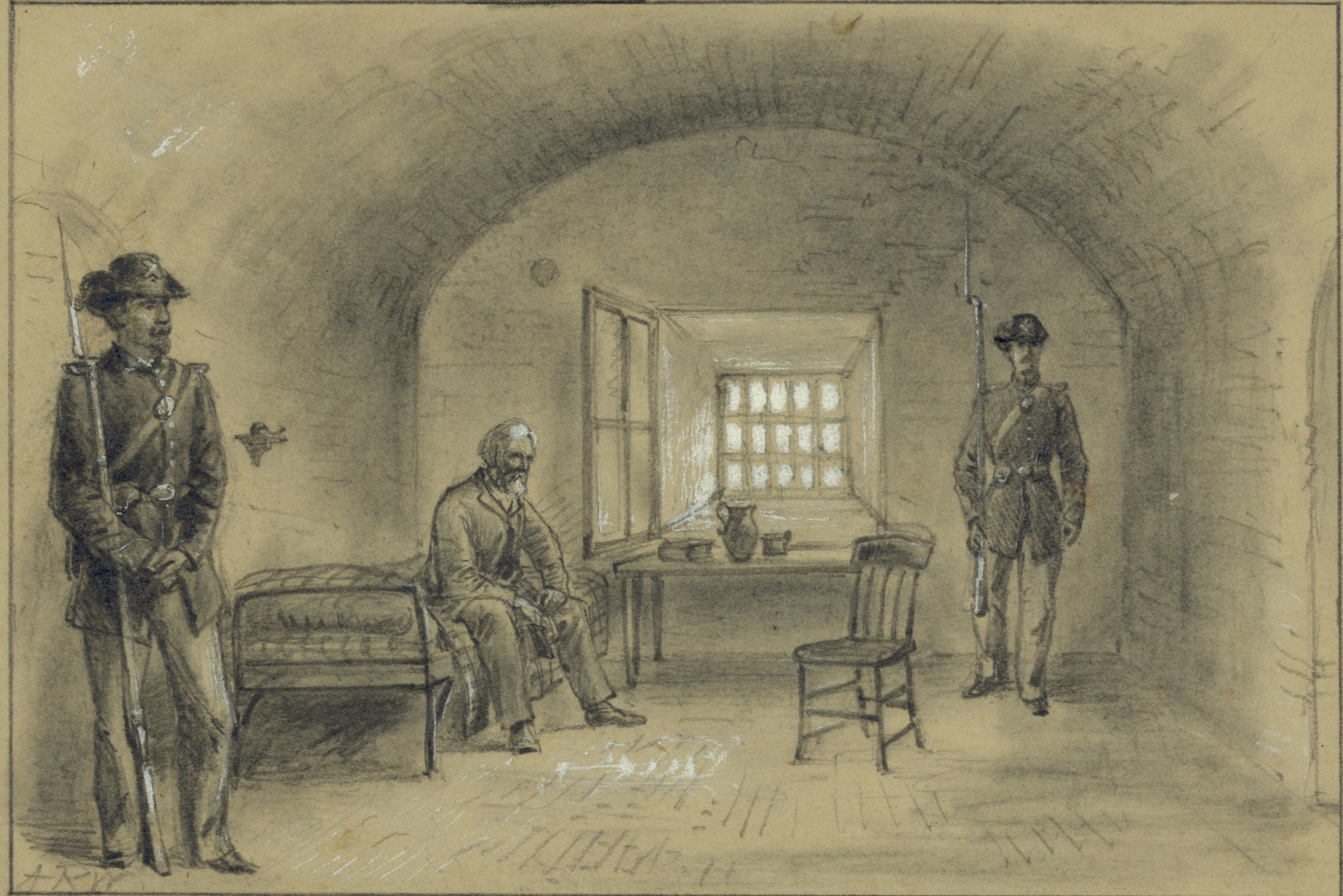
Sketch of Davis in Fort Monroe casemate by Alfred Waud (1865)

On May 22, 1865, Davis was imprisoned in Fort Monroe, Virginia, under the watch of Major General Nelson A. Miles. Initially, he was confined to a casemate, forced to wear fetters on his ankles, required to have guards constantly in his room, forbidden contact with his family, and given only a Bible and his prayerbook to read. Over time, his treatment improved: due to public outcry, the fetters were removed after five days; within two months, the guard was removed from his room, he could walk outside for exercise, and he was allowed to read newspapers and other books. In October, he was moved to better quarters. In April 1866, Varina was permitted to regularly visit him. In September, Miles was replaced by Brevet Brigadier General Henry S. Burton, who permitted Davis to live with Varina in a four-room apartment. In December, Pope Pius IX sent a photograph of himself to Davis. (Note: The pope's photograph was inscribed Venite ad me omnes qui laboratis, et ego reficiam vos, dicit Dominus [Come unto me all that are heavy laden and I will refresh you, says the Lord].)

President Andrew Johnson's cabinet was unsure what to do with Davis. He had been arrested for complicity in the assassination of Abraham Lincoln. The cabinet considered trying him by military court for war crimes—his alleged involvement in the assassination of Abraham Lincoln or the mistreatment of Union prisoners of war at Andersonville Prison—but could not find any reliable evidence directly linking Davis to either. In late summer 1865, Attorney General James Speed determined that it was best to try Davis for treason in a civil criminal trial. In June 1866, the House of Representatives passed a resolution by a vote of 105 to 19 to put Davis on trial for treason. Davis also desired a trial to vindicate his actions. His defense lawyer, Charles O'Conor wanted to argue that Davis did not commit treason because he was no longer a citizen of the United States when Mississippi left the United States. (Note: Historian Ethan Rafuse states Davis "had obviously committed treason", and anthropologist Paul A. Shackel states that Confederates "committed treason by seceding from the United States".) Because the trial was to be held in Richmond, Union prosecutors worried a jury might sympathize with Davis and acquit him in an act of jury nullification that would be interpreted as validating the constitutionality of secession.

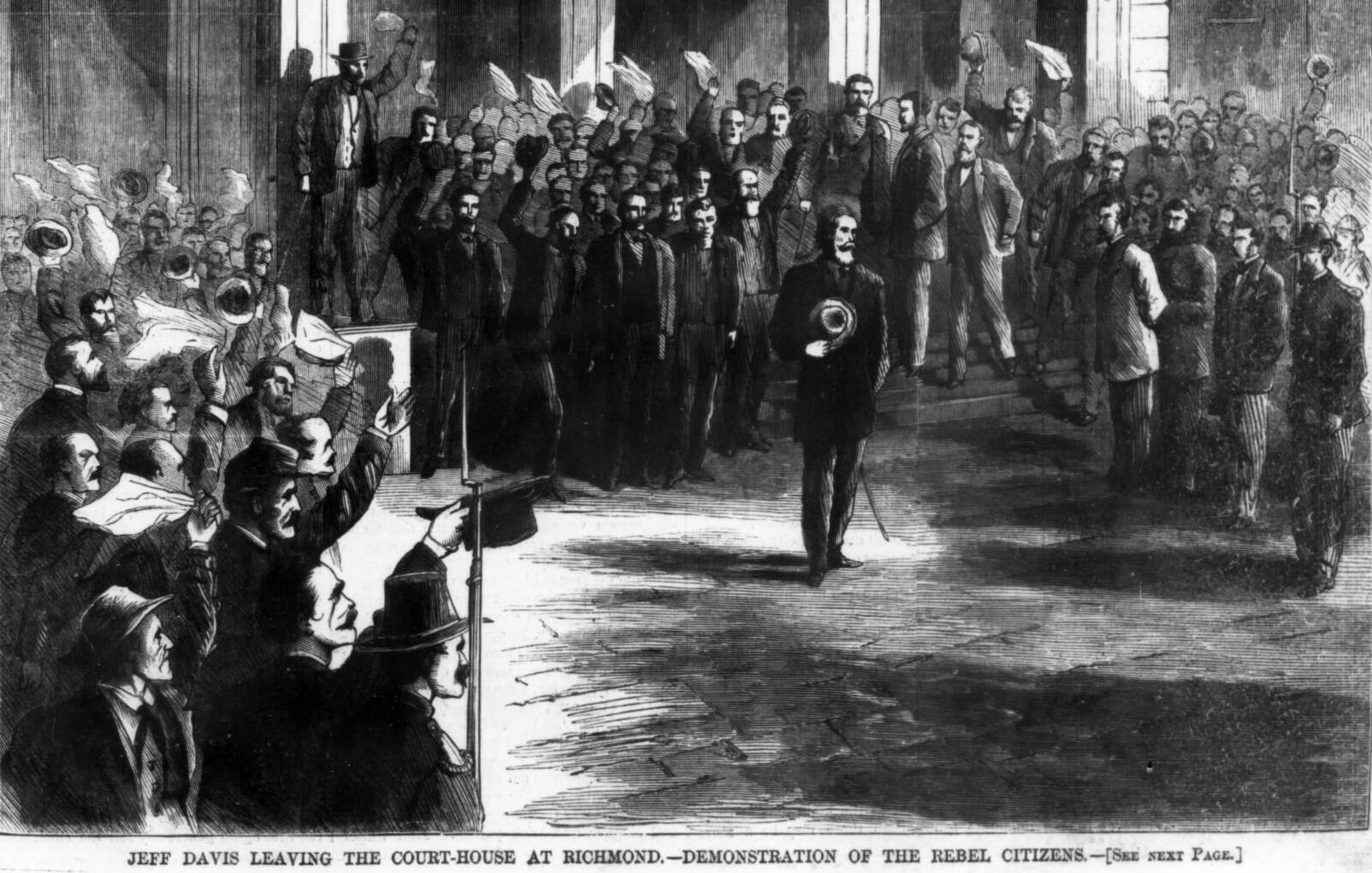
Illustration of Jefferson Davis leaving the Richmond court house by Harper's Weekly (1867)

After two years of imprisonment, Davis was released at Richmond on May 13, 1867, on bail of $100,000 (~$1.89 million in 2025), which was posted by prominent citizens including Horace Greeley, Cornelius Vanderbilt and Gerrit Smith. Davis and Varina went to Montreal, Quebec, to join their children who had been sent there while he was in prison, and they moved to Lennoxville, Quebec. Davis remained under indictment until after Johnson's proclamation on Christmas 1868 granting amnesty and pardon to all participants in the rebellion. Davis's case never went to trial. In February 1869, Attorney General William Evarts informed the court that the federal government declared it was no longer prosecuting the charges against him.

== Later years ==
=== Seeking a livelihood ===
He turned down a position as head of Randolph–Macon College in Virginia because he did not want to damage the school's reputation while he was under indictment. In the summer of 1869, he traveled to Britain and France, but found no business opportunities there. When the federal government dropped its case against him, Davis left his family in England and returned to the U.S. in October 1869 to become president of the Carolina Life Insurance Company in Tennessee. On his arrival to Tennessee, the University of the South offered him their top position, but he declined because the salary was insufficient. Davis was not able to retrieve his family from England until August 1870.

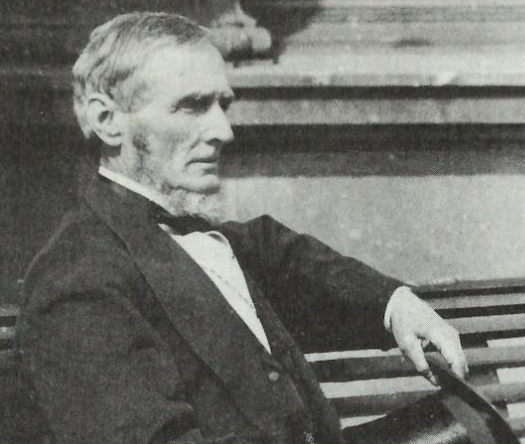
Photograph of Jefferson Davis in Glasgow (c. 1869)

Davis received numerous invitations to speak during this time, declining most. In 1870, he delivered a eulogy to Robert E. Lee at the Lee Monument Association in Richmond in which he avoided politics and emphasized Lee's character. Davis's 1873 speech to the Virginia Historical Society was more political; he stated that the South would not have surrendered had it known what to expect from Reconstruction, particularly the enfranchisement of African Americans. He became a life-time member of the Southern Historical Society, which was devoted to presenting the Lost Cause explanation of the Civil War. Initially, the society had scapegoated political leaders like Davis for losing the war, but eventually shifted the blame for defeat to the former Confederate general James Longstreet. Davis avoided public disputes regarding blame, but consistently maintained he had done nothing wrong and had always upheld the Constitution.

The Panic of 1873 adversely affected the Carolina Life Company, and Davis resigned in August 1873 when the directors merged the company over his objections. He went to Europe again in 1874 to seek opportunities to earn money, but was still not able to find any. After returning to the United States in 1874, Davis continued to explore ways to make a living, including investments in railroads, mining, and manufacturing an ice-making machine. In 1876, he was offered the presidency of the Agricultural and Mechanical College of Texas. He declined because Varina also did not want to live in Texas, recommending Thomas S. Gathright instead. He worked for an English company, the Mississippi Valley Society, to promote trade and European immigration. When he and Varina went to Europe again in 1876, he determined the company was failing. He returned to the United States while Varina stayed in England.

Davis sought to reclaim Brierfield as well. After the war, Davis Bend had been taken over by the Freedmen's Bureau, which employed former enslaved African Americans as laborers. After Davis's elder brother, Joseph, successfully applied for a pardon, he regained ownership of Davis Bend. Unable to maintain it, Joseph gave his former slave Ben Montgomery and his sons, Isaiah and William, a mortgage loan to buy the property. When Joseph died in 1870, he had made Davis one of his executors but did not deed any land to him in the will. Davis litigated to obtain Brierfield. A judge dismissed his suit in 1876. He appealed, and the Supreme Court of Mississippi found in his favor in 1878. He foreclosed on the Montgomerys, who were in default on their mortgage. By December 1881, Brierfield was legally his, although he did not live there, and it did not produce a reliable income.

=== Author ===
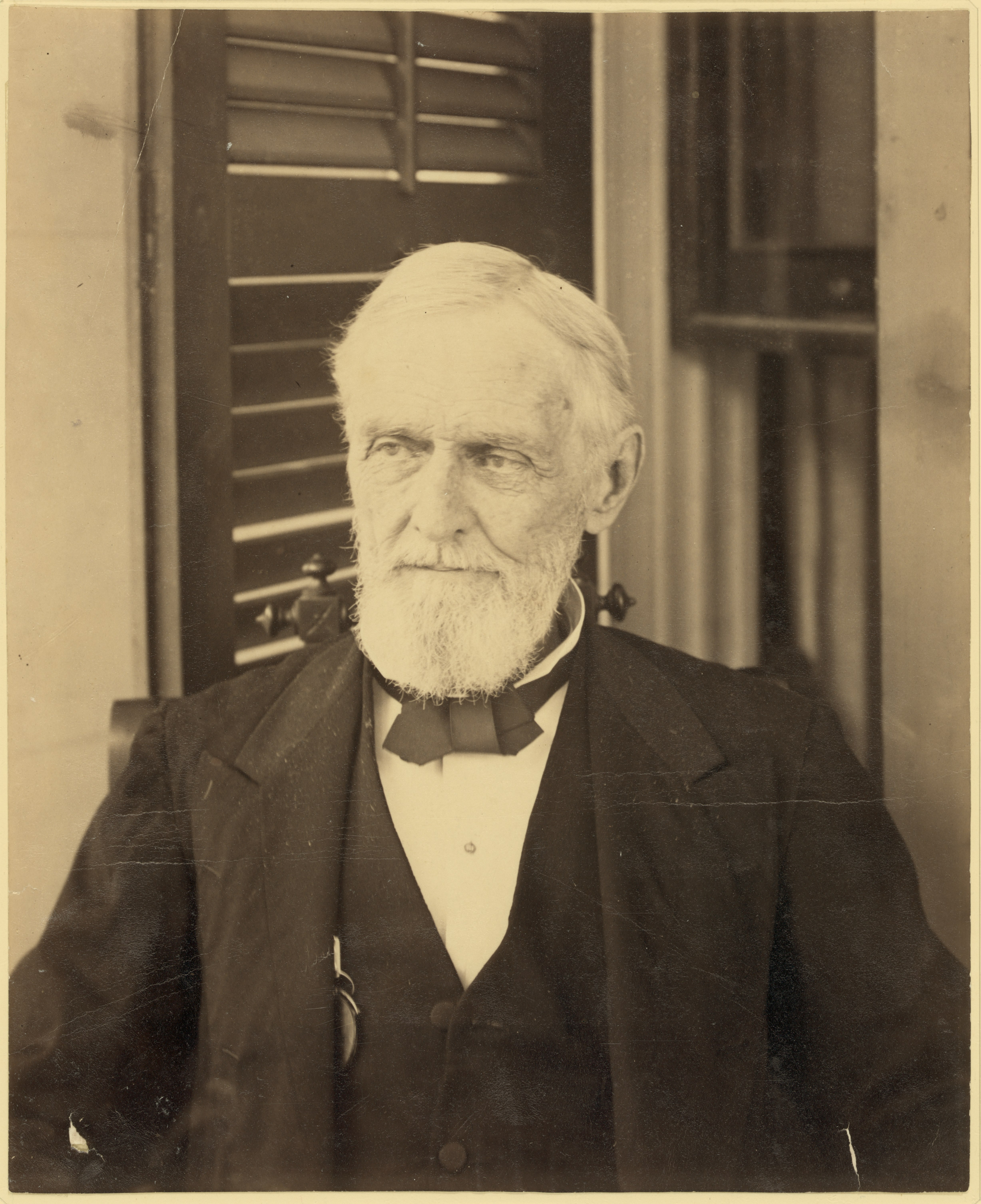
Photograph of Jefferson Davis at his home in Beauvoir by Edward Wilson (c. 1885)

In January 1877, the author Sarah Dorsey invited Davis to live on her estate at Beauvoir, Mississippi, and to begin writing his memoirs. He agreed, but insisted on paying board. At the time, Davis and Varina lived separately. When Varina came back to the United States, she initially refused to come to Beauvoir because she did not like Davis's close relationship with Dorsey, who was serving as his amanuensis. In the summer of 1878, Varina relented, moving to Beauvoir and taking over the role of Davis's assistant. Dorsey died in July 1879, and left Beauvoir to Davis in her will, and he lived there for most of his remaining years.

Davis's first book, The Rise and Fall of the Confederate Government, was published in 1881. The book was intended as a vindication of Davis's actions during the war and an argument for the righteousness of secession, though it downplayed slavery's role as a cause of the war. James Redpath, editor of the North American Review, encouraged him to write a series of articles for the magazine and to complete his final book A Short History of the Confederate States of America. He also began dictating his memoirs, although they were never finished.

In 1886, Henry W. Grady, an advocate for the New South, convinced Davis to lay the cornerstone for a monument to the Confederate dead in Montgomery, Alabama, and to attend the unveilings of statues memorializing Davis's friend Benjamin H. Hill in Savannah and the Revolutionary War hero Nathanael Greene in Atlanta. The tour was a triumph for Davis and got extensive newspaper coverage, which emphasized national unity and the South's role as a permanent part of the United States. At each stop along the way, large crowds came out to cheer Davis, solidifying his image as an icon of the South and the Confederacy. In October 1887, Davis held his last tour, traveling to the Georgia State Fair in Macon, Georgia, for a grand reunion with Confederate veterans.

== Death ==
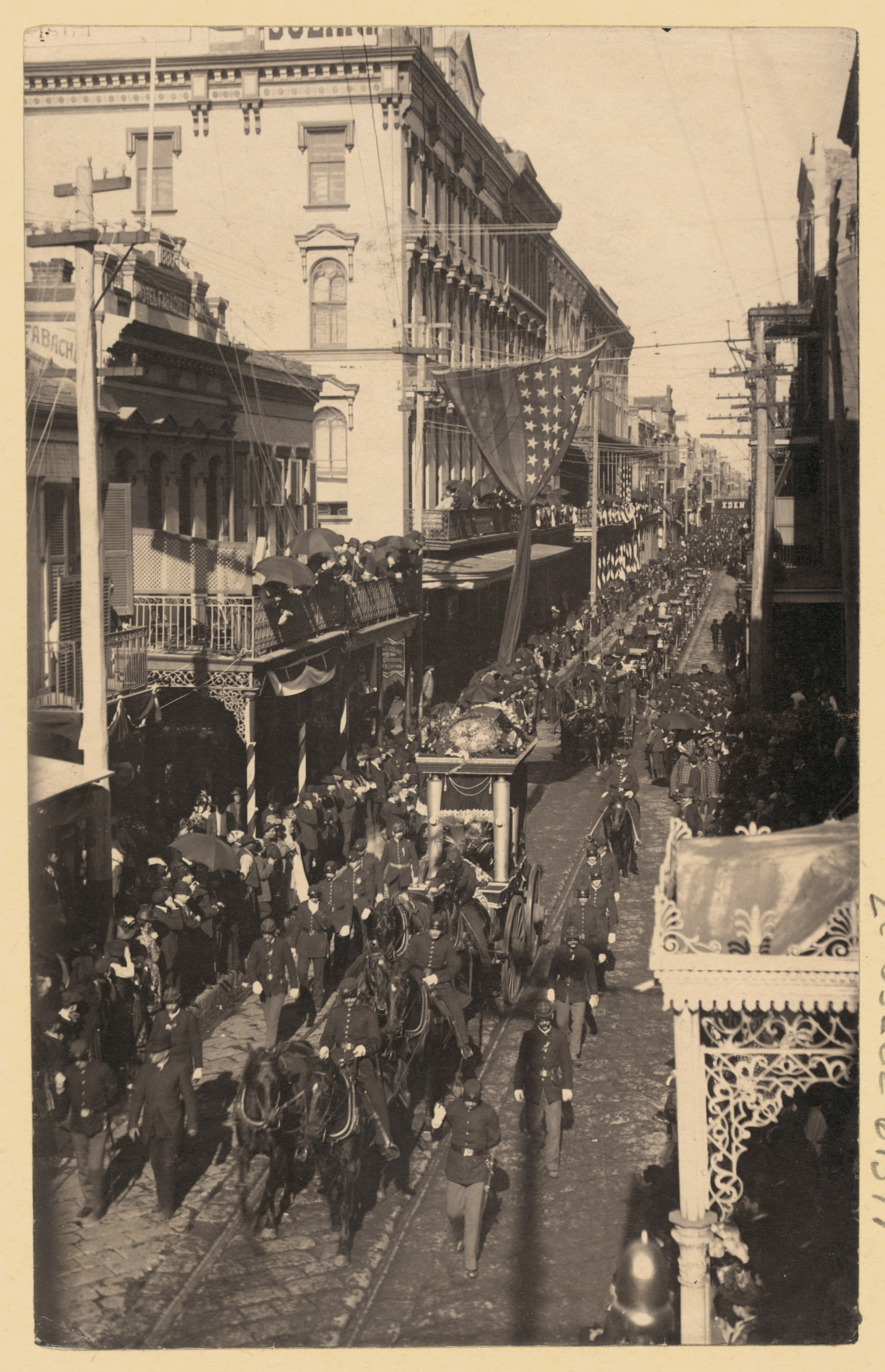
Funeral procession of Jefferson Davis in New Orleans (1889)

In November 1889, Davis embarked on a steamboat in New Orleans in a cold rain, intending to visit Brierfield plantation. He fell ill during the trip, but refused to send for a doctor. An employee sent a telegram to Varina, who came to get him. Davis was diagnosed with acute bronchitis complicated by malaria. When he returned to New Orleans, Davis's doctor Stanford E. Chaille pronounced him too ill to travel further. He was taken to the home of Charles Erasmus Fenner, the son-in-law of his friend J. M. Payne, where he died at 12:45 a.m. on December 6, 1889, at the age of 81, holding Varina's hand and surrounded by several friends.

=== Funeral and reburial ===
Davis's body lay in state at the New Orleans City Hall from December 7 to 11. Davis's funeral was one of the largest held in the South; over 200,000 mourners were estimated to have attended. The coffin was transported on a two-mile journey to the cemetery in a modified, four-wheeled caisson to emphasize his role as a military hero. Davis was buried according to the Episcopal rites and a brief eulogy was pronounced by Bishop John Nicholas Galleher.

After Davis's funeral, various Southern states requested to be the final resting site for Davis's remains. Varina decided that Davis should be buried in Richmond, which she saw as the appropriate resting place for dead Confederate heroes. She chose Hollywood Cemetery. In May 1893, Davis's remains traveled from New Orleans to Richmond. Along the way, the train stopped at various cities, receiving military honors and visits from governors, and the coffin was allowed to lie in state in three state capitols: Montgomery, Alabama; Atlanta, Georgia; and Raleigh, North Carolina. When Davis was reburied, his children were reinterred on the site as Varina requested, and, when Varina died in 1906, she was buried beside him.

== Political views on slavery ==
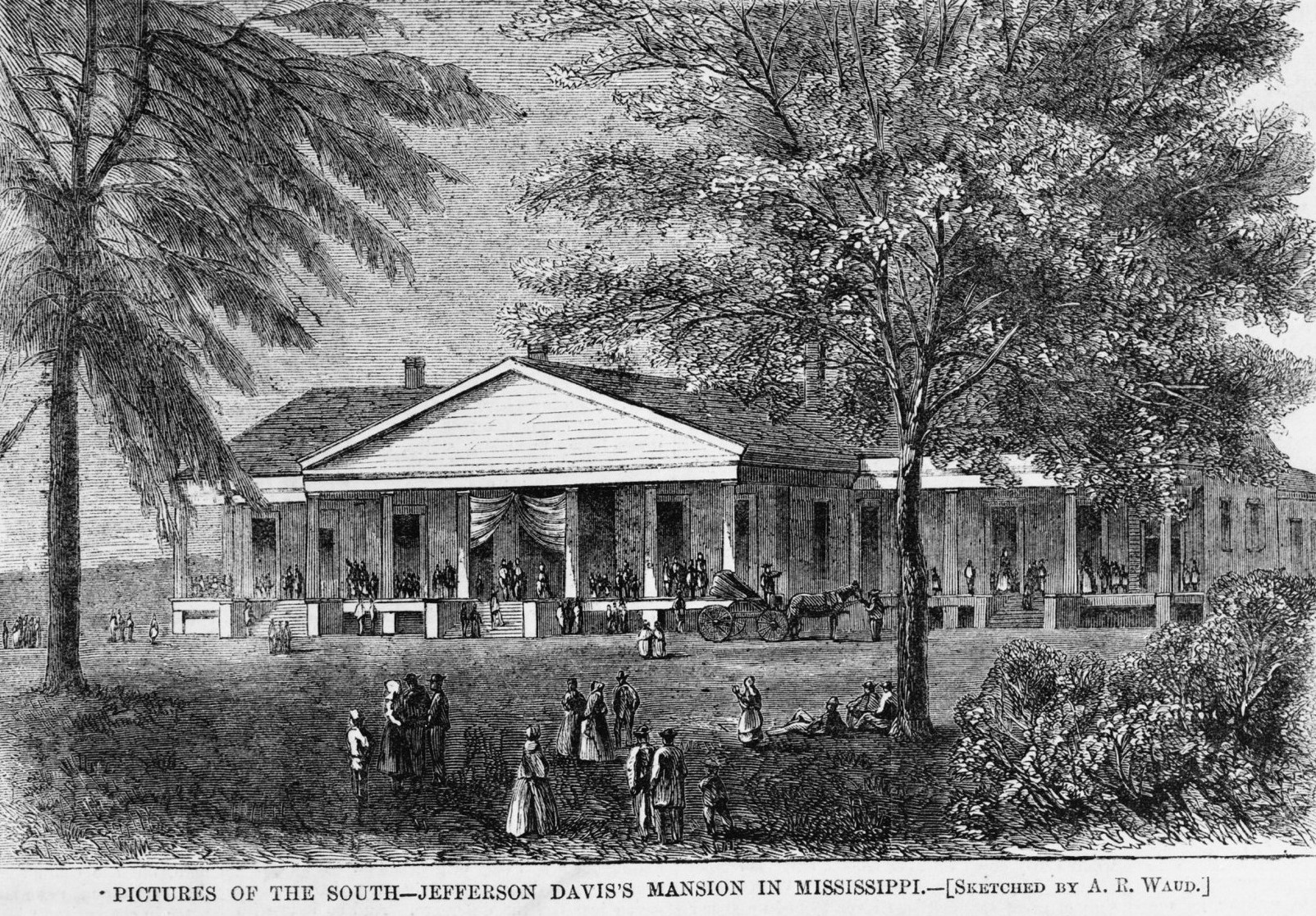
Sketch of Davis's Brierfield Plantation by Alfred Waud (1866)

During his years as a senator, Davis was an advocate for the Southern states' right to slavery. In an 1848 speech on the Oregon Bill, he argued for a strict constructionist understanding of the Constitution. He insisted that the states are sovereign, all powers of the federal government are granted by those states, the Constitution recognized the right of states to allow citizens to have slaves as property, and the federal government was obligated to defend encroachments upon this right. In his February 13–14, 1850 speech, Davis declared that slaveholders must be allowed to bring their slaves into federal territories. He stated that slavery does not need to be justified: it was sanctioned by religion and history. He argued that African Americans were destined for bondage, and their enslavement was a civilizing blessing to them that brought economic and social good to everyone.

Davis's speeches after secession acknowledged the relationship between the Confederacy and slavery. In his resignation speech to the Senate, delivered 12 days after his state seceded, he said Mississippi "has heard proclaimed the theory that all men are created free and equal, and this made the basis of an attack upon her social institutions and the sacred Declaration of Independence has been invoked to maintain the position of the equality of the races." In his February 1861 inaugural speech as provisional president of the Confederacy, Davis asserted that the Confederate Constitution, which explicitly prevented Congress from passing any law affecting African-American slavery and mandated its protection in all Confederate territories, was a return to the intent of the original founders. When he spoke to Congress in April on the ratification of the Constitution, he stated that the war was caused by Northerners whose desire to end slavery would destroy Southern property worth millions of dollars." In his 1863 address to the Confederate Congress, Davis denounced the Emancipation Proclamation as evidence of the North's long-standing intention to abolish slavery and doom African Americans, whom he called an inferior race, to extermination.

== Performance as commander-in-chief ==
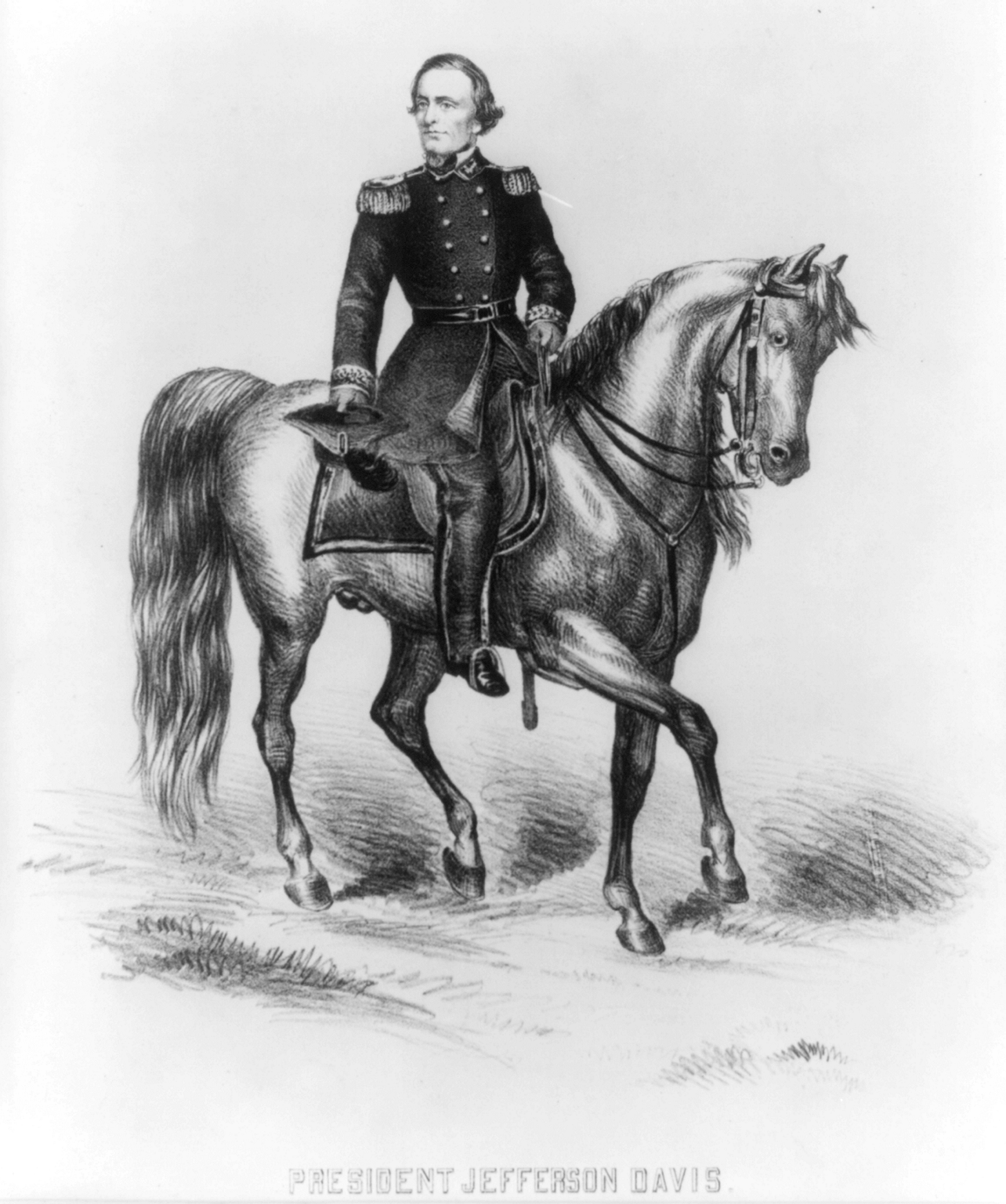
Drawing of Davis arriving at the field of Battle of First Manassas (c. 1861 – c. 1865)

Davis came to the role of commander-in-chief confident in his military abilities. He had graduated from the United States Military Academy, served in the regular army, and commanded troops in combat. He actively oversaw the military policy of the Confederacy and worked long hours attending to paperwork related to the organization, finance, and logistics needed to maintain the Confederate armies.

Some historians argue that Davis's personality contributed to the defeat of the Confederacy. His constant attention to minor military details has been used to illustrate an inability to delegate, which led him to lose focus on larger issues. He has been accused of being a poor judge of generals: appointing people—such as Bragg, Pemberton, and Hood—–who failed to meet expectations, overly trusting long-time friends, and retaining generals—like Joseph Johnston—long after they should have been removed. His need to be seen as always in the right has also been described as a problem. Historians have argued that the time spent vindicating himself took time away from pressing problems and accomplished little. His reactions to criticism made unnecessary enemies and created hostile relationships with the politicians and generals he depended on. It has been argued that his focus on military victory at all costs undermined the values the South was fighting for, such as states' rights and slavery, but provided no alternatives to replace them.

Other historians have pointed out his strengths. Davis quickly mobilized the Confederacy despite the South's focus on states' rights, and he stayed focused on gaining independence. He was a skilled orator who attempted to share the vision of national unity. He shared his message through newspapers, public speeches, and trips where he would meet with the public. His policies sustained the Confederate armies through numerous campaigns, buoying Southern hopes for victory and undermining the North's will to continue the war. A few historians have argued that Davis may have been one of the best people available to serve as commander in chief. Though he was unable to win the war, he rose to the challenge of the presidency, pursuing a strategy that not only enabled the Confederacy to hold out as long as it did, but almost achieved its independence.

== Legacy ==
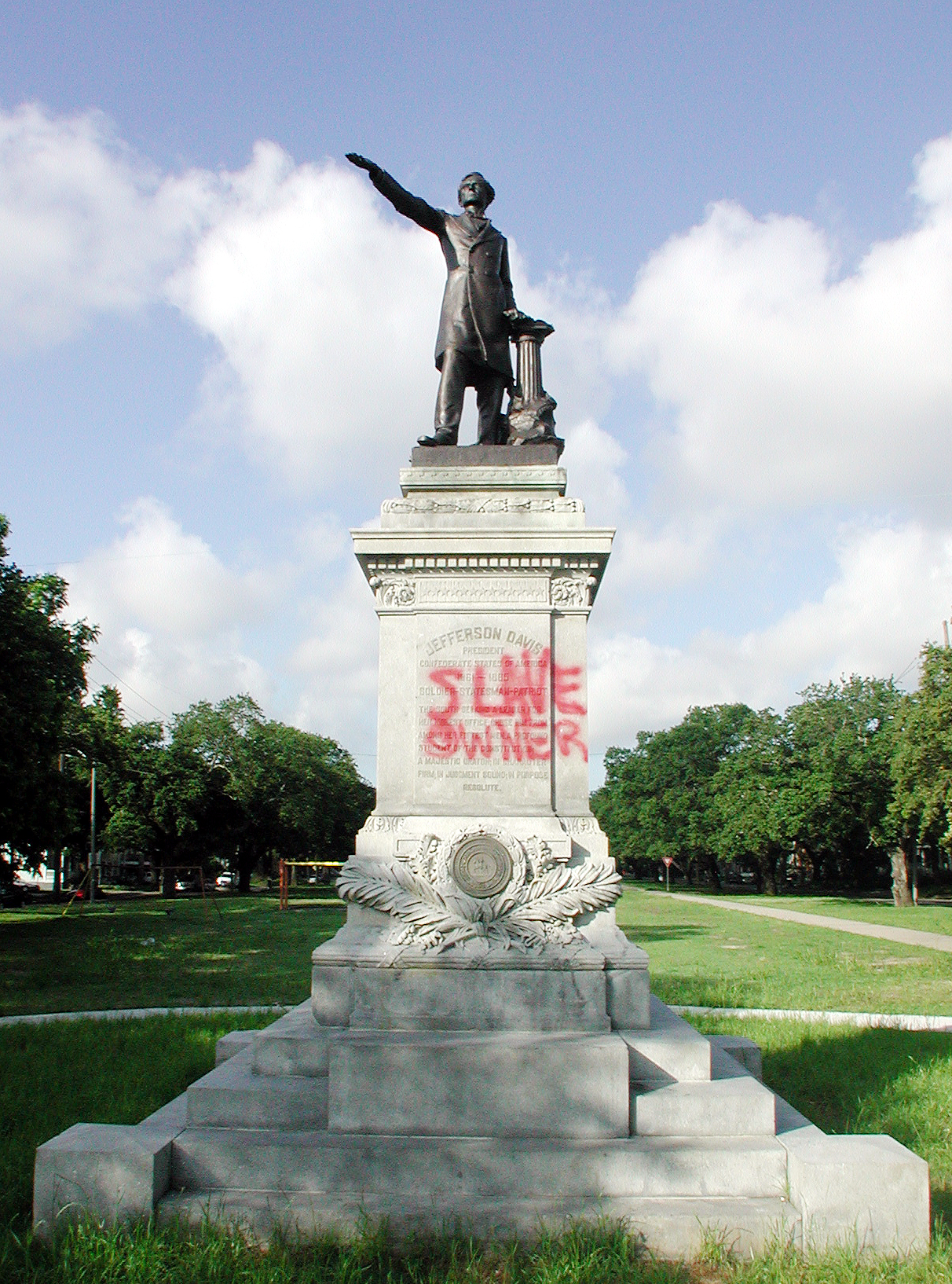
The Jefferson Davis monument in New Orleans with "SLAVE OWNER" graffiti, May 2004. It was dismantled in 2017.

Although Davis served the United States as a soldier and a war hero, a politician who sat in both houses of Congress, and a cabinet officer, his legacy is mainly defined by his role as president of the Confederacy. After the Civil War, journalist Edward A. Pollard, who first popularized the Lost Cause mythology, placed much of the blame for losing the war on Davis. Into the 20th century, many biographers and historians have also emphasized Davis's responsibility for the Confederacy's failure to achieve independence. Since the second half of the 20th century, this assumption has been questioned. Some scholars argued that he was a capable leader, while acknowledging his skills were insufficient to overcome the challenges the Confederacy faced and exploring how his limitations may have contributed to the war's outcome.

Davis's standing among white Southerners was at a low point at the end of the Civil War, but it rebounded after his release from prison. After Reconstruction, he became a venerated figure of the white South, and he was often depicted as a martyr who suffered for his nation. His birthday was made a legal holiday in six Southern states. His popularity among white Southerners remained strong in the early 20th century. Around 200,000 people attended the unveiling of the Jefferson Davis Memorial at Richmond, Virginia, in 1907. Mississippi officials honored him with a life-size likeness in the National Statuary Hall at the U.S. Capitol in 1931. In 1961, a centennial celebration reenacted Davis's inauguration in Montgomery, Alabama, with fireworks and a cast of thousands in period costumes. In the early 21st century, there were at least 144 Confederate memorials commemorating him throughout the United States.

On October 17, 1978, Davis's U.S. citizenship was posthumously restored after the Senate passed Joint Resolution 16. President Jimmy Carter described it as an act of reconciliation reuniting the people of the United States and expressing the need to establish the nation's founding principles for all. However, Davis's legacy continued to spark controversy. In the 21st century, most historians agree that Davis's participation in the Confederacy constituted treason. His memorials, such as the Jefferson Davis Highway, have been argued to legitimize the white supremacist, slaveholding ideology of the Confederacy, and a number have been removed, including his statues at the University of Texas at Austin, New Orleans, Memphis, Tennessee, and the Kentucky State Capitol in Frankfort. After the murder of George Floyd in May 2020, protesters toppled Davis's statue on his Richmond monument along with the statues of other figures considered racists. As part of its initiative to dismantle Confederate monuments, the Richmond City Council funded the removal of the statue's pedestal, which was completed in February 2022, and ownership of its artifacts was given to the Black History Museum and Cultural Center of Virginia.

== Writings ==
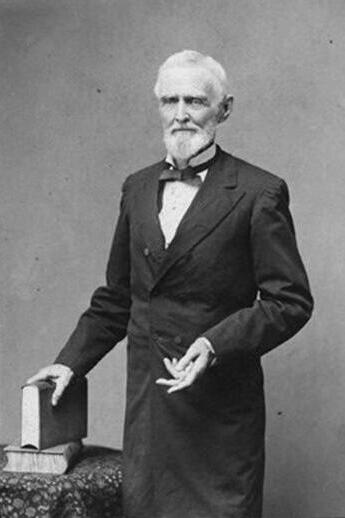
Photograph of Davis by W. W. Washburn (c. 1888)

=== Books ===
- The Rise and Fall of the Confederate Government. D. Appleton. 1881. OCLC 1084571088. [2 Volumes]
- Andersonville and Other War-Prisons. Belford. 1890. OCLC 902841567. [reprint from Belford's Magazine vol. 4 pp. 161–178 and 338–353]
- A Short History of the Confederate States of America. Belford. 1890. OCLC 1084918966.

=== Articles ===
- "The Indian policy of the United States". The North American Review. 143 (360): 436–446. 1886.
- "Life and character of the Hon. John Caldwell Calhoun". The North American Review. 145 (370): 246–260. 1887.
- "Lord Wolseley's mistakes". The North American Review. 149 (395): 472–482. 1889.
- "Robert E. Lee". The North American Review. 150 (398): 55–56. 1889. JSTOR 25101921.
- "Autobiography of Jefferson Davis". Belford's Magazine. 4 (21): 255–266. February 1890. [reprinted in Dunbar 1923, vol. 1 pp. xx–xxxi]
- "The doctrine of state rights". The North American Review. 150 (399): 204–219. 1890.

=== Collections of letters, speeches, and papers ===
- Rowland, Dunbar, ed. (1923). Jefferson Davis, Constitutionalist: His Letters, Papers, and Speeches. Mississippi Department of Archives and History. OCLC 566306304. (10 Volumes).
- Crist, Lynda L., ed. (1971–2015). The Papers of Jefferson Davis. Rice University. (14 Volumes). A selection of these documents can be found at: "List of Documents Available Online". Rice University: The Papers of Jefferson Davis.

== Bibliography ==
=== Books ===
- Atchison, R. Jarrod (2017). A War of Words: The Rhetorical Leadership of Jefferson Davis. University of Alabama Press. ISBN 978-0-8173-1940-3. OCLC 986538432.
- Ball, Douglas B. (1991). Financial Failure and Confederate Defeat. University of Illinois Press. ISBN 978-0-252-01755-1. OCLC 1148617048.
- Beckert, Sven (2015). Empire of Cotton: A Global History. Vintage Books. ISBN 978-0-375-71396-5. OCLC 1301977762.
- Black Hawk (1882). Patterson, J. B. (ed.). Autobiography of Ma-ka-tai-me-she-kia-kiak or Black Hawk. Translated by LeClair, Antoine. J. B. Patterson. OCLC 1039980047.
- Bordewich, Fergus M. (2012). America's Great Debate: Henry Clay, Stephen A. Douglas, and the Compromise that Preserved the Union. Simon & Schuster. ISBN 978-1-4391-2460-4. OCLC 1285466261.
- Cashin, Joan E. (2006). First Lady of the Confederacy: Varina Davis's Civil War. Belknap Press of Harvard University Press. ISBN 978-0-674-02294-2. OCLC 0674022947.
- Collins, Donald E. (2005). The Death and Resurrection of Jefferson Davis. Rowman & Littlefield Publishers. ISBN 978-0-7425-4304-1. OCLC 56614193.
- Connelly, Thomas L. (1977). The Marble Man: Robert E. Lee and His Image in American Society. Knopf. ISBN 0-394-47179-2. OCLC 469500741.
- Connelly, Thomas L.; Bellows, Barbara L. (1982). God and General Longstreet: The Lost Cause and the Southern Mind. Louisiana State University Press. ISBN 0-8071-1020-5. OCLC 45731896.
- Cook, Robert J. (2007). Troubled Commemoration: The American Civil War Centennial, 1961–1965. Louisiana State University Press. ISBN 978-0-8071-3227-2. OCLC 740449986.
- Cooper, William J. Jr.; Terrill, Tom E. (1991). The American South: A History. Knopf. ISBN 978-0-394-58948-0. OCLC 1150030909.
- Cooper, William J. Jr. (2000). Jefferson Davis, American. Knopf. ISBN 978-0-307-77264-0. OCLC 1035904007.
- Cooper, William J. Jr. (2008). Jefferson Davis and the Civil War Era. Louisiana State University Press. ISBN 978-0-8071-3371-2. OCLC 1302084578.
- Crackel, Theodore J. (2002). West Point: A Bicentennial History. University Press of Kansas. ISBN 0-7006-1160-6. OCLC 1036965649.
- Davis, Harry A. (1927). The Davis Family (Davies and David) in Wales and America; Genealogy of Morgan David of Pennsylvania. Washington, D. C., H. A. Davis, 1927. OCLC 20801352.
- Davis, William C. (1991). Jefferson Davis: The Man and his Hour. Harpercollins. ISBN 0-06-016706-8. OCLC 1150103061. - Wikipedia article on the book: Jefferson Davis: The Man and His Hour
- DeRosa, Marshall L. (1991). The Confederate Constitution of 1861 : An Inquiry into American Constitutionalism. Simon & Schuster. ISBN 0-8262-0812-6. OCLC 1148595299.
- Dugard, Martin (2009). The Training Ground: Grant, Lee, Sherman, and Davis in the Mexican War, 1846–1848. University of Nebraska Press. ISBN 978-0-8032-2812-2. OCLC 1302546114.
- Durden, Robert F. (1972). The Gray and the Black: The Confederate Debate on Emancipation. Louisiana State University Press. ISBN 0-8071-0244-X. OCLC 1035312500.
- Eaton, Clement (1977). Jefferson Davis. Free Press. ISBN 0-02-908700-7. OCLC 1035928281.
- Eckert, Edward K. (1987). "Fiction Distorting Fact": Prison Life, Annotated by Jefferson Davis. Mercer University Press. ISBN 0-86554-201-5. OCLC 1200471494.
- Eisenhower, John S. D. (1990). So Far from God: The U.S. War with Mexico 1846–1848. Anchor Books. ISBN 0-385-41214-2. OCLC 1036955120.
- Escott, Paul D. (1978). After Secession: Jefferson Davis and the Failure of Confederate Nationalism. Louisiana State University Press. ISBN 978-0-8071-1807-8. OCLC 3844261.
- Escott, Paul D. (2009). "What Shall We Do With the Negro?": Lincoln, White Racism, and the Civil War. Louisiana State University Press. ISBN 978-0-8071-0369-2. OCLC 1145788949.
- Foster, Gaines M. (1987). Ghosts of the Confederacy: Defeat, The Lost Cause, and the Emergence of the New South, 1865 to 1913. Harvard University Press. ISBN 978-0-19-504213-9. OCLC 13794080.
- Gallagher, Gary W. (1997). The Confederate War. Harvard University Press. ISBN 0-674-16055-X. OCLC 1259497424.
- Goldfield, David R. (2002). Still Fighting the Civil War: The American South and Southern History. Louisiana State University Press. ISBN 0-674-16055-X. OCLC 1245805998.
- Hattaway, Herman; Beringer, Richard E. (2002). Jefferson Davis, Confederate President. University Press of Kansas. ISBN 978-0-7006-1170-6.
- Harsh, Joseph L. (1998). Confederate Tide Rising: Robert E. Lee and the Making of Southern Strategy, 1861–1862. Kent State University Press. ISBN 9780873385800. OCLC 36589943.
- Hattaway, Herman; Jones, Archer (1991). How the North Won: A Military History of the Civil War. University of Illinois Press. ISBN 0-252-00918-5. OCLC 1285549950.
- Hermann, Janet Sharp (1981). The Pursuit of a Dream. Oxford University Press. ISBN 0-19-502887-2. OCLC 1151068422.
- Hermann, Janet Sharp (1990). Joseph E. Davis: Pioneer Patriarch. University Press of Mississippi. ISBN 978-0-87805-488-6. OCLC 1200479903.
- Hubbard, Charles M. (1998). The Burden of Confederate Diplomacy. University of Tennessee Press. ISBN 1-57233-002-3. OCLC 1301784875.
- Hunter, Lloyd A. (2000). "The Immortal Confederacy: Another Look at Lost Cause Religion". In Gallagher, Gary W.; Nolan, Alan T. (eds.). The Myth of the Lost Cause and Civil War History. Indiana University Press. pp. 185–218. ISBN 0-253-33822-0. OCLC 1148084732.
- Icenhauer-Ramirez, Robert (2019). Treason on Trial: The United States v. Jefferson Davis. Louisiana State University Press. ISBN 978-0-8071-7080-9. OCLC 1056201876.
- Lane, John Jay (1903). History of Education in Texas (PDF). Washington, DC: Government Printing Office – via Texas Legal Guide.
- Larson, Carlton C. W. (2020). "The Case of Jefferson Davis, President of the Confederate States of America". On Treason: A Citizen's Guide to the Law. Ecco. ISBN 9780062996169. OCLC 1182021191.
- Lavender, David S. (1966). Climax at Buena Vista: The American Campaigns in Northeastern Mexico. Lippincott. OCLC 1029283882.
- Levine, Bruce R. (2006). Confederate Emancipation: Southern Plans to Free and Arm Slaves during the Civil War. Simon & Schuster. ISBN 978-0-8071-2758-2. OCLC 1285645774.
- McPherson, James M. (2014). Embattled Rebel: Jefferson Davis as Commander in Chief. Penguin Press. ISBN 978-1-59420-497-5. OCLC 1204326178.
- Neely, Mark E.; Holzer, Harold; Boritt, Gabor S. (1987). The Confederate Image: Prints of the Lost Cause. University of North Carolina Press. ISBN 978-0-8078-4905-7. OCLC 248959614.
- Nicoletti, Cynthia (2017). Secession on Trial: The Treason Prosecution of Jefferson Davis. Cambridge University Press. ISBN 9781108415521. Review
- Nolan, Alan T. (2000). "The Anatomy of the Myth". In Gallagher, Gary W.; Nolan, Alan T. (eds.). The Myth of the Lost Cause and Civil War History. Indiana University Press. pp. 11–34. ISBN 0-253-33822-0. OCLC 1148084732.
- Owsley, Frank L. (1959). King Cotton Diplomacy: Foreign Relations of the Confederate States of America. University of Chicago Press. OCLC 1150138640.
- Potter, David M. (1976). Fehrenbacher, Don E. (ed.). The Impending Crisis, 1848–1861. Harper & Row. ISBN 0-06-013403-8. OCLC 1149517693.
- Rafuse, Ethan (2013). "Davis, Jefferson Finis". In Tucker, Spencer C. (ed.). American Civil War: The Definitive Encyclopedia and Document Collection. Vol. 2. ABC-CLIO.
- Rennick, Robert M. (1984). Kentucky Place Names. University Press of Kentucky. ISBN 0-8131-1503-5. OCLC 1302092929.
- Roland, Charles P. (1991). "Confederate Government and Administration". An American Iliad:The Story of the Civil War. Louisiana State University Press. ISBN 0-8071-0369-1. OCLC 1145788949.
- Rubin, Anne Sarah (2005). A Shattered Nation: The Rise and Fall of the Confederacy, 1861–1868. University of North Carolina Press. ISBN 0-8078-2928-5. OCLC 1256491263.
- Shackel, Paul A. (2022). "Negotiating the Memory of the American Civil War". In Altinõz, Meltem Özkan (ed.). Cultural Encounters and Tolerance Through Analyses of Social and Artistic Evidences: From History to the Present. IGI Global. pp. 36–50. ISBN 9781799894407.
- Stampp, Kenneth M. (1980). The Imperiled Union: Essays on the Background of the Civil War. Simon & Schuster. ISBN 0-19-502681-0. OCLC 1035615086.
- Stoker, Donald J. (2010). The Grand Design: Strategy and the U.S. Civil War. Oxford University Press. ISBN 978-0-19-537305-9. OCLC 1149215547.
- Thomas, Emory M. (1970). The Confederacy as Revolutionary Experience. Prentice-Hall. OCLC 1147732382.
- Thomas, Emory M. (1998). "Rebellion and Conventional Warfare: Confederate Strategy and Military Policy". In McPherson, James M.; Cooper, William J. Jr. (eds.). Writing the Civil War: The Quest to Understand. University of South Carolina Press. pp. 36–59. ISBN 1-57003-389-7. OCLC 1302554523.
- Todd, Richard C. (1954). Confederate Finance. University of Georgia Press. OCLC 1244725167. ISBN 0-252-01755-2.
- Wallner, Peter A. (2007). Franklin Pierce: Martyr for the Union. Vol. II. Plaidswede. ISBN 978-0-9790784-2-2. OCLC 436298116.
- Winders, Richard B. (2016). Panting For Glory: The Mississippi Rifles in the Mexican War. Texas A & M University. ISBN 978-1-62349-416-2. OCLC 933438558.
- Woods, Michael E. (2020). Arguing Until Doomsday: Stephen Douglas, Jefferson Davis, and the Struggle for American Democracy. University of North Carolina Press. ISBN 978-1-4696-5639-7. OCLC 1119478016.
- Woodworth, Steven E. (1990). Jefferson Davis and His Generals: The Failure of Confederate Command in the West. University Press of Kansas. ISBN 978-0-7006-0461-6. OCLC 1035892379.

=== Journal articles ===
- Atuire, Caesar Alimsinya (2020). "Black Lives Matter and the removal of racist statues: Perspective of an African". Inquiries into Art, History, and the Visual. 2: 449–467. Archived from the original on December 5, 2022.
- Beckert, Sven (2004). "Emancipation and empire: Reconstructing the worldwide web of cotton production in the age of the American Civil War". American Historical Review. 109 (5): 1405–1438. doi:10.1086/530931. ISSN 0002-8762. JSTOR 10.1086/530931. S2CID 161634950.
- Bleser, Carol K. (1999). "The Marriage of Varina Howell and Jefferson Davis: 'I gave the best and all my life to a girdled tree.'". Journal of Southern History. 65 (1): 3–40. doi:10.2307/2587730. JSTOR 2587730.
- Currie, David P. (2004). "Through the looking-glass: the Confederate Constitution in Congress, 1861–1865". Virginia Law Review. 90 (5): 1257–1399. doi:10.2307/3202380. JSTOR 3202380.
- Fleming, Walter L. (April 1917). "The Early Life of Jefferson Davis". Proceedings of the Mississippi Valley Historical Association (Extra number, Buck, S. J. (ed.)). IX, Part 1: 151–176. ISSN 0161-391X. Archived from the original on December 10, 2025.
- Hague, Euan; Sebesta, Edward H. (2011). "The Jefferson Davis Highway: Contesting the Confederacy in the Pacific Northwest". The Journal of American Studies. 45 (2): 281–301. doi:10.1017/S0021875811000089. JSTOR 23016275. S2CID 145607515.
- Hattaway, Herman (December 1992). "[Review:] Jefferson Davis: The Man and his Hour by William C. Davis". The Journal of American History. 79 (3): 1178–1179. doi:10.2307/2080868. JSTOR 2080868.
- Huston, James L. (1999). "Property rights in slavery and the coming of the Civil War". The Journal of Southern History. 65 (2): 249–286. doi:10.2307/2587364. JSTOR 2587364.
- Johnson, Ludwell H. (1960). "Fort Sumter and Confederate diplomacy". Journal of Southern History. 26 (4): 441–447. doi:10.2307/2204623. JSTOR 2204623.
- MacDonnell, Francis (June 1994). "Reconstruction in the Wake of Vietnam: The Pardoning of Robert E. Lee and Jefferson Davis". Civil War History. 40 (2): 119–133. doi:10.1353/cwh.1994.0011.
- Muldowny, John (1969). "Jefferson Davis: The postwar years". The Mississippi Quarterly. 23 (1): 17–35. JSTOR 26473833.
- Scanlan, P. L. (1940). "The military record of Jefferson Davis in Wisconsin". The Wisconsin Magazine of History. 24 (2): 174–182. JSTOR 4631371.
- Simpson, John A. (1975). "Cult of the "lost cause"". Tennessee Historical Quarterly. 34 (4): 350–361. JSTOR 42623867.
- Starnes, Richard D. (1996). "Forever faithful: The Southern Historical Society and Confederate historical memory". Southern Cultures. 2 (2): 177–194. doi:10.1353/scu.1996.0006. JSTOR 26235410. S2CID 143650397.
- Todd, Richard C. (1958). "C. G. Memminger and the Confederate Treasury Department". The Georgia Review. 12 (4): 396–410. JSTOR 41395577.
- Waite, Kevin (2016). "Jefferson Davis and proslavery visions of empire in the Far West" (PDF). Journal of the Civil War Era. 8 (4): 536–565. doi:10.1353/cwe.2016.0072. JSTOR 26070455. S2CID 164302059.
- Williams, Kenneth H.; Cooper, William J. Jr.; Roland, Charles P. (2003). Williams, Kenneth H. (ed.). "Slavery, the Civil War, and Jefferson Davis: An interview with William J. Cooper Jr. and Charles P. Roland". The Register of the Kentucky Historical Society. 101 (4): 400–456. JSTOR 23387081.
- Vandiver, Frank E. (1977). "Jefferson Davis—Leader without legend". The Journal of Southern History. 43 (1): 3–18. doi:10.2307/2207552. JSTOR 2207552.

=== Online ===
- "About Jefferson Davis". The Papers of Jefferson Davis. Archived from the original on February 5, 2022.
- Blackburn, Piper H. (July 14, 2020). "GOP lawmakers complain about Davis statue removal process". Associated Press. Archived from the original on December 6, 2022.
- "Jefferson Davis Statue". Architect of the Capitol. Archived from the original on June 11, 2016.
- "Joseph Evan Davis". The Papers of Jefferson Davis. Archived from the original on July 2, 2013.
- "Margaret Howell Davis Hayes". The Papers of Jefferson Davis. Archived from the original on July 2, 2013.
- Matisse, Jonathan (December 21, 2017). "Confederate statues removed after Memphis sells public parks". Associated Press. Archived from the original on January 29, 2021.
- "Preventing Diplomatic Recognition of the Confederacy, 1861–1865". United States Department of State: Office of the Historian. Archived from the original on August 28, 2013.
- "Raw: Confederate statue removed amid controversy". Associated Press. May 11, 2017. Archived from the original on December 6, 2022.
- "Richmond starts removal of Confederate monument pedestals". Associated Press. February 2, 2020. Archived from the original on May 10, 2022.
- Southern Poverty Law Center (2022). Whose Heritage? Public Symbols of the Confederacy (PDF) (Report) (3rd ed.). Southern Poverty Law Center. Archived from the original (PDF) on February 1, 2022.
- "Today in History–November 6". The Library of Congress. Archived from the original on February 24, 2024.
- "University of Texas removes Jefferson Davis statue". Associated Press. August 30, 2015. Archived from the original on December 6, 2022.
- "Varina Anne Davis". The Papers of Jefferson Davis. Archived from the original on July 2, 2013.
- "William Howell Davis". The Papers of Jefferson Davis. Archived from the original on August 14, 2020.
- "Workers removing Davis monument pedestal find box in stone". Associated Press. February 16, 2020. Archived from the original on February 17, 2022.

Primary sources

- Carter, Jimmy (1978). Peters, Gerhard; Woolley, John T. (eds.). "Restoration of Citizenship Rights to Jefferson F. Davis Statement on Signing S. J. Res. 16 into Law". American Presidency Project. Archived from the original on May 26, 2013.
- Confederate Congress (1861). Permanent Constitution of the Confederate States of America. James H. Goody. OCLC 1050739878.
- Davis, Jefferson (1848). Speech of Jefferson Davis, of Mississippi, on the Oregon bill. Delivered in the Senate of the United States, July 12, 1848. Towers. OCLC 1155588355.
- Davis, Jefferson (1850). Speech of Jefferson Davis, of Mississippi, on the Subject of Slavery in the Territories. Delivered in the Senate of the United States, February 13 & 14, 1850. Towers. OCLC 974454463.
- Davis, Jefferson (1923) [1858]. "Speech of Jefferson Davis before the Mississippi Legislature, November 16, 1858". In Rowland, Dunbar (ed.). Jefferson Davis, Constitutionalist: His Letters, Papers, and Speeches. Vol. III. Mississippi department of Archives and History. pp. 339–360. OCLC 49736253. ISBN 978-0-404-02000-2.
- Davis, Jefferson (1861a). "Jefferson Davis's Farewell Address: Senate Chamber, U.S. Capitol, January 21, 1861". Rice University: The Papers of Jefferson Davis. Archived from the original on June 27, 2017.
- Davis, Jefferson (1861b). "Jefferson Davis' First Inaugural Address: Alabama Capitol, Montgomery, February 18, 1861". Rice University: The Papers of Jefferson Davis. Archived from the original on December 15, 2020.
- Davis, Jefferson (1861c). "Message to Congress April 29, 1861 (Ratification of the [Confederate] Constitution)". The Avalon Project—Documents in Law, History and Diplomacy; Yale Law School: Lillian Goldman Law Library. Archived from the original on December 12, 2008.
- Davis, Jefferson (1862). "Jefferson Davis' Second Inaugural Address, Virginia Capitol, Richmond, February 22, 1862". The Papers of Jefferson Davis. Archived from the original on September 20, 2020.
- Davis, Jefferson (1906) [1863a]. "Jefferson Davis' Message to the Third Session of the First Confederate Congress, Delivered in Richmond, January 12, 1863". In Richardson, James D. (ed.). A Compilation of the Messages and Papers of the Confederacy, Including the Diplomatic Correspondence, 1861–1865. United States Publishing. pp. 279–297 – via wikisource.
- Davis, Jefferson (1906) [1863b]. "Jefferson Davis' Message to the Fourth Session of the First Confederate Congress, Delivered in Richmond, December 7, 1863". In Richardson, James D. (ed.). A Compilation of the Messages and Papers of the Confederacy, Including the Diplomatic Correspondence, 1861–1865. United States Publishing. pp. 345–382 – via wikisource.
- Davis, Jefferson (1906) [1864]. "Jefferson Davis' Message to the First Session of the Second Confederate Congress, Delivered in Richmond, May 2, 1864". In Richardson, James D. (ed.). A Compilation of the Messages and Papers of the Confederacy, Including the Diplomatic Correspondence, 1861–1865. United States Publishing. pp. 443–448 – via wikisource.
- Davis, Jefferson (1865). "To the People of the Confederate States of America. Danville, Va., April 4, 1865". The Papers of Jefferson Davis. Archived from the original on September 17, 2020.
- Jones, J. G. (April 28, 1886). "Reminiscences of Maj. Gen. Thomas Hinds". The Clarion. p. 1.
- Johnson, Andrew (1868). "December 25, 1868.- Granting Full Pardon and Amnesty to All Persons Engaged in the Late Rebellion". Library of Congress. Archived from the original on February 22, 2020.
- McPherson, Edward (1868). "Trial of Jefferson Davis". A Handbook of Politics for 1868. Philp & Solomons. p. 113. ISBN 9788123743141.

U.S. House of Representatives
Preceded by Tilghman Tucker	Member of the U.S. House of Representatives from Mississippi's at-large congressional district Seat D 1845–1846	Succeeded by Henry T. Ellett
U.S. Senate
Preceded by Jesse Speight	U.S. Senator (Class 1) from Mississippi; 1847–1851; Served alongside: Henry S. Foote	Succeeded by John J. McRae
Preceded by Thomas Benton	Chair of the Senate Military Affairs Committee; 1849–1851	Succeeded by James Shields
Preceded by Stephen Adams	U.S. Senator (Class 1) from Mississippi; 1857–1861; Served alongside: Albert G. Brown	Vacant American Civil War Title next held by Adelbert Ames
Preceded by John B. Weller	Chair of the Senate Military Affairs Committee; 1857–1861	Succeeded by Robert W. Johnson
Party political offices
Preceded by John A. Quitman	Democratic nominee for Governor of Mississippi; 1851	Succeeded by John J. McRae
Political offices
Preceded by Charles Conrad	United States Secretary of War; 1853–1857	Succeeded by John B. Floyd
New office	President of the Confederate States; Provisional: 1861–1862; 1862–1865	Office abolished
