= William Thornton Montgomery =

American freedman, businessman (1843–1909)

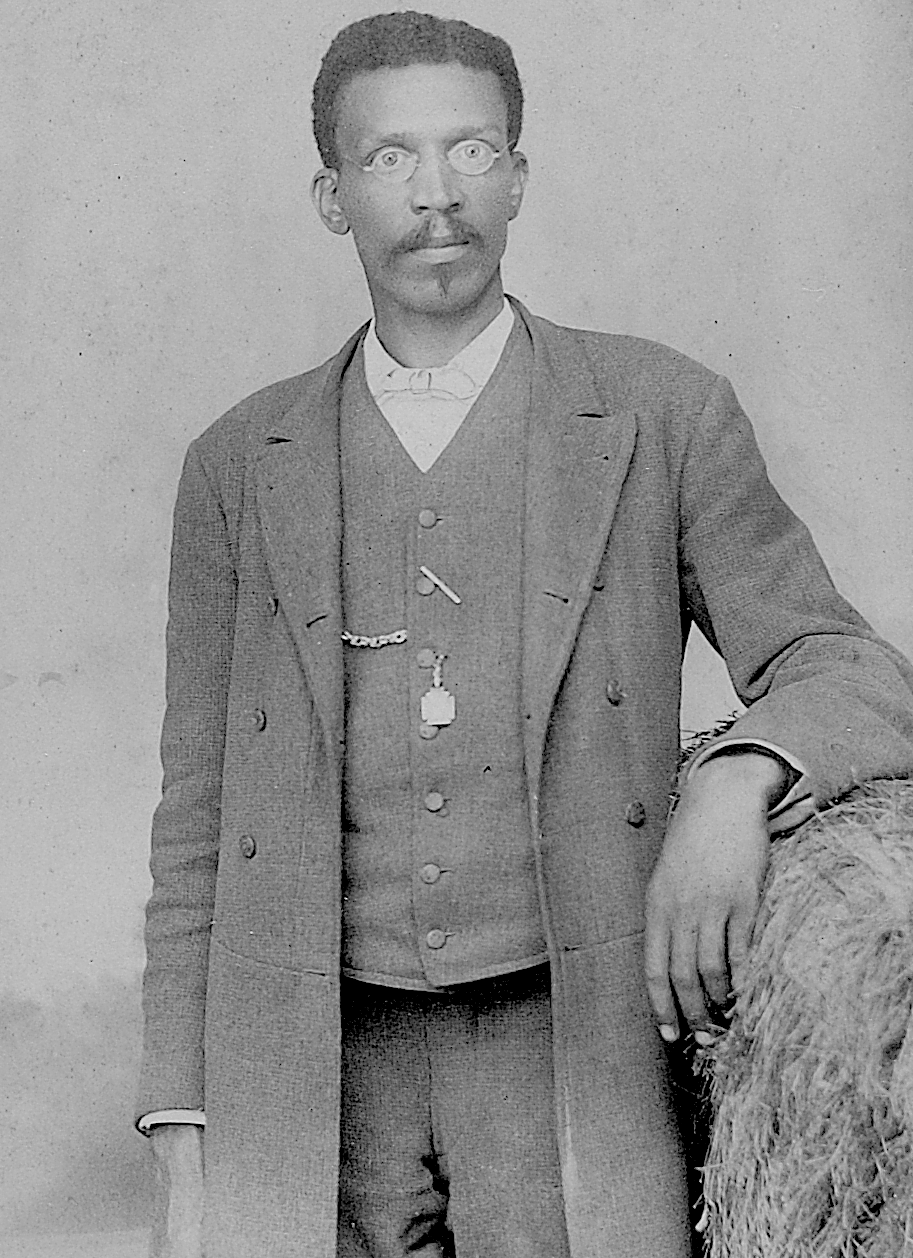
- Photo from the Milburn J. Crowe Photograph Album of William Thornton Montgomery ca. 1865. Courtesy of the Mississippi Department of Archives and History
- Born: February 1843; Warren County, Mississippi, U.S.
- Died: July 3, 1909 (age 66); Mound Bayou, Mississippi, U.S.
- Burial place: Mound Bayou Cemetery
- Occupations: Freedman, businessman, farmer, community leader, carpenter
- Father: Benjamin Thornton Montgomery
- Relatives: Isaiah Montgomery (brother), Mary Montgomery Booze (niece)

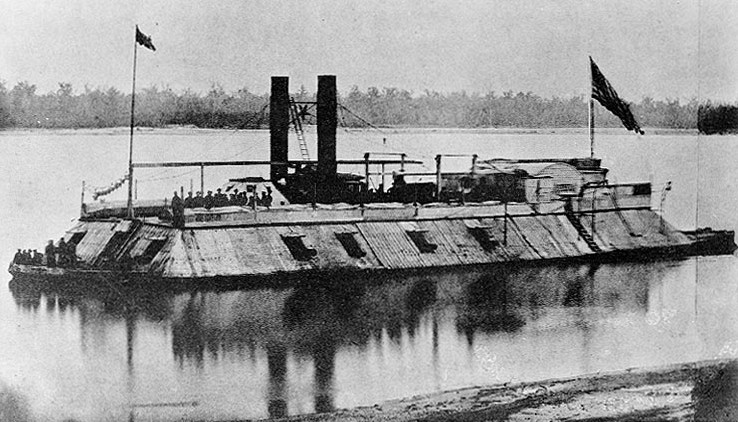
Montgomery served as a seaman on the USS Carondelet between December 1863 and March 1864.

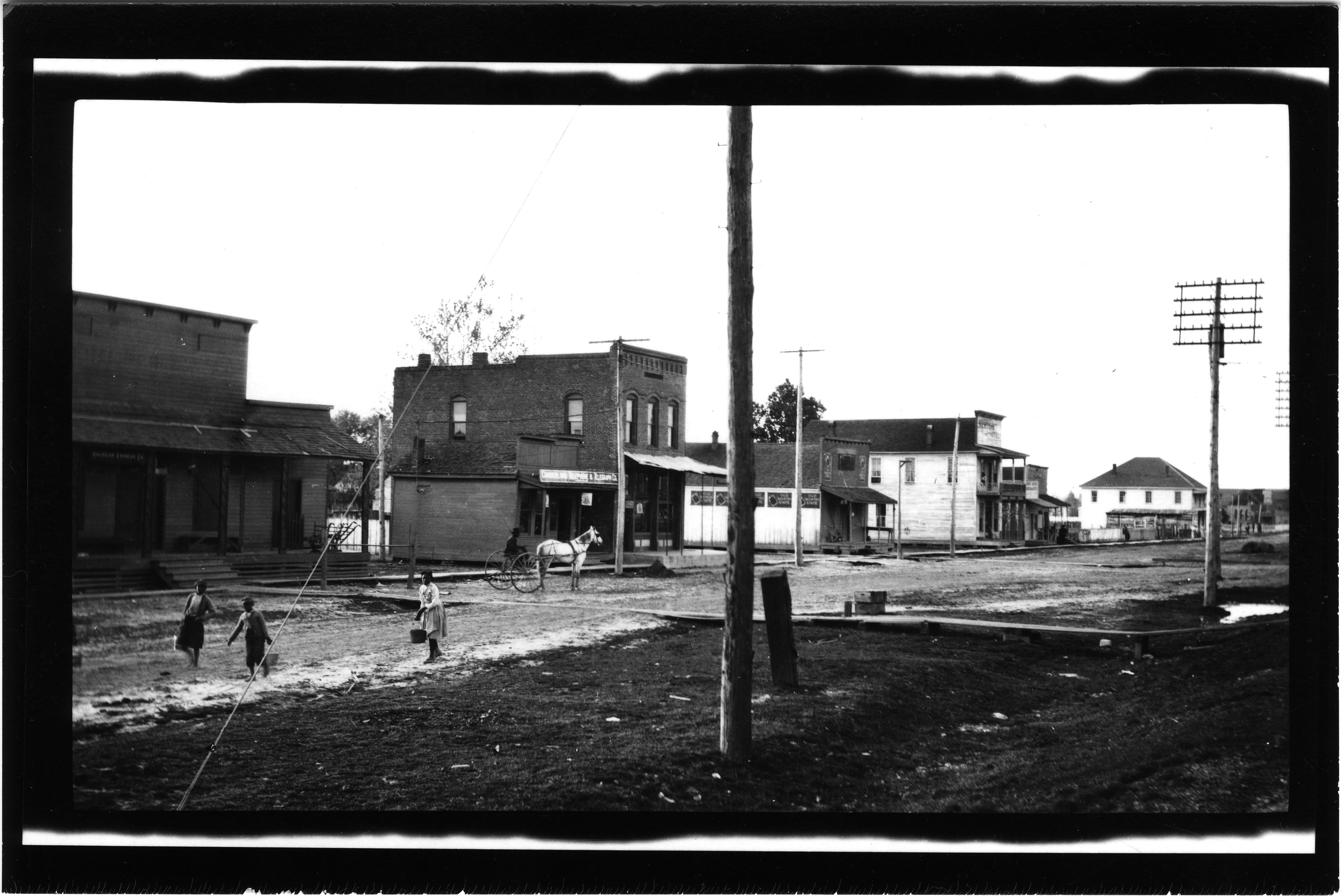
Mound Bayou, Mississippi.

William Thornton Montgomery (February 1843 – July 3, 1909) was an American freedman, businessman, farmer, and community leader, best known for his contributions to agriculture and his advocacy for African American empowerment. The Montgomery family, including W. T. Montgomery and Isaiah Montgomery, would later become prominent figures in the post-emancipation era, advocating for the rights and advancement of African Americans.

Born into slavery on Joseph Davis' Hurricane plantation in Warren County, Mississippi, in February 1843, Montgomery was the eldest son of Benjamin Thornton Montgomery and Mary Montgomery. He grew up alongside his younger brother, Isaiah Montgomery, who later founded Mound Bayou, Mississippi, an all-black community.

== Early life and education ==
William Thornton Montgomery was born into slavery on February 1843, on Joseph Davis' Hurricane plantation in Warren County, Mississippi, to parents Mary Montgomery and Benjamin Thornton Montgomery. He was the eldest son, grew up alongside his younger brother, Isaiah Montgomery. As a child, Montgomery experienced the hardships of slavery but was determined to seek education, despite legal prohibitions. His father, Benjamin Montgomery, was a highly educated and charismatic individual, instilled in him the values of self-improvement and community building.

Montgomery spent his formative years working as a carpenter on Hurricane Plantation at Davis Bend, he was enslaved by Joseph Emory Davis, the brother of Confederate president, Jefferson Davis. Davis Bend was not a typical Southern plantation; it operated as a unique experiment in utopian living for enslaved people, influenced by the ideas of early utopian socialist philosopher Robert Owen. Davis ran the plantation with a vision of creating a community where enslaved individuals could live and work together harmoniously.

Montgomery's father, Benjamin Montgomery, played a crucial role in the operations of Davis Bend. Despite being enslaved, Benjamin was highly educated and possessed remarkable business acumen. He was tasked with overseeing the plantation's operations, ensuring its success under Joseph Davis's unique vision. With Davis' permission, Mr. Montgomery opened a general store on the plantation called Montgomery & Sons, which became incredibly successful. The income allowed Benjamin to purchase Mary's time from Joe Davis so she could raise William and his siblings instead of working in the fields.

Growing up at Davis Bend, William Thornton Montgomery experienced a childhood unlike many other enslaved individuals of his time. He witnessed firsthand the implementation of Joseph Davis's progressive policies, which included providing education, fair treatment, and opportunities for personal development to the enslaved community. The enslaved were encouraged to learn trades that interested them, and Davis allowed them to keep extra money they made in their chosen skilled work, rare among Southern slave owners. It was illegal to teach an enslaved person how to read and write in Mississippi, but Joseph Davis encouraged it.

Moreover, Davis Bend's unique approach to governance extended to its legal system. Overseers were prohibited from punishing individuals without a fair trial at the plantation's Hall of Justice, and sexual exploitation of enslaved women, a common practice elsewhere in the South, was strictly forbidden. As "progressive" as Joseph Davis' policies may seem however, his general rule as that "the less people are governed, the more submissive they will be to control."

Although the Montgomery family experienced comparatively better living conditions at Davis Bend than many enslaved people elsewhere, they remain enslaved and continued to seek their freedom.

The experience of growing up at Davis Bend shaped William Thornton Montgomery's worldview and instilled in him a desire to challenge the status quo. It was here that he first encountered the principles of community cooperation and self-sufficiency, ideals that would later influence his entrepreneurial pursuits and advocacy for African American empowerment.

== Civil war and post-emancipation era ==
After the American Civil War began in 1861, Joseph Davis fled at the first sign of the Union Navy along his section of the Mississippi River. Joseph Davis' slave utopia failed – all Davis Bend residents embraced freedom and many men enlisted in the US Army and Navy. Both Montgomery brothers joined the US Navy, William serving aboard the river ironclad USS Carondelet, and Isaiah as the personal attendant of Admiral David Dixon Porter. Davis Bend became a refugee camp for formerly enslaved people seeking the protection of the Union Navy stationed nearby. As the former home of Confederate President Jefferson Davis, the United States took pleasure in turning Davis Bend into a place where the Freedmen's Bureau experimented with ways of easing formerly enslaved people into freedom and the market economy.

In February of 1865, 22-year-old William Thornton Montgomery returned to Davis Bend, reopened his father's store, and became head of a company of African American cotton farmers protected by soldiers of the United States Colored Troops. The rest of the family soon joined him, and Benjamin once again became the leader of the Davis Bend community.

On November 19, 1866, Montgomery's father purchased both Davis Bend plantations (Hurricane and Brierfield) for $300,000 ($6.04 million in 2024), laying the groundwork for their entrepreneurial endeavors.

The following years saw the family reach unprecedented highs but it ended in hard times. Their store, Montgomery & Sons, flourished and expanded. Benjamin petitioned the government for a post office to serve Davis Bend, and on May 6, 1867, William Thornton Montgomery became its postmaster, and perhaps the first African American postmaster in the South. Soon after, William was named constable for the Justice of the Peace, and the latter post was soon awarded to his father. Both of these appointments were likely firsts among African Americans in the South.

== The Montgomery & Sons Association ==
The Montgomery and Sons Association was a community and business venture established by Benjamin Thornton Montgomery, William Thornton Montgomery's father, following the end of the Civil War and emancipation of enslaved individuals. Benjamin Montgomery, who had been enslaved on Joseph Davis' plantation, was highly educated and a mechanical and business genius. He purchased the plantation from Joseph Davis after the war and shared Davis' utopian philosophy.

"The Association" aimed to create a community of free African American sharecroppers in Mississippi. They envisioned a self-sufficient and prosperous community where freedmen could live and work independently. The association operated as a collective enterprise, with members pooling resources and labor to cultivate land and engage in various business ventures. Plantation owner Montgomery would lease land on good terms to members of the Association. Davis Bend's courts were reestablished, schools were built, and workers pooled their efforts for community projects like levee maintenance.

At its peak, the Montgomery and Sons Association was among the wealthiest merchant-planters in the South. The community flourished for a time, with improved living conditions, educational opportunities, and economic success for its members. However, the association faced challenges such as local natural disasters, the collapse of the cotton industry, and legal disputes over land ownership.

After the war, the cotton industry and the Southern economy in general went into steep decline. The buying price of $300k was good for 1867, but within years the land was worth a fraction of that price. The debt was an impossible burden to overcome. A flood broke through the plantation's levees and permanently rerouted the Mississippi River, turning Davis Bend into Davis Island. Prices for cotton plummeted in spite of uncooperative weather and insects causing decreasing yields.

Ultimately, the demise of the Montgomery and Sons Association led Montgomery to seek opportunities elsewhere, eventually leading him to Dakota Territory. Despite its eventual decline, the Montgomery & Sons Association represents a significant chapter in the history of African American entrepreneurship and community-building in post-Civil War America.

== Migration to Dakota Territory ==
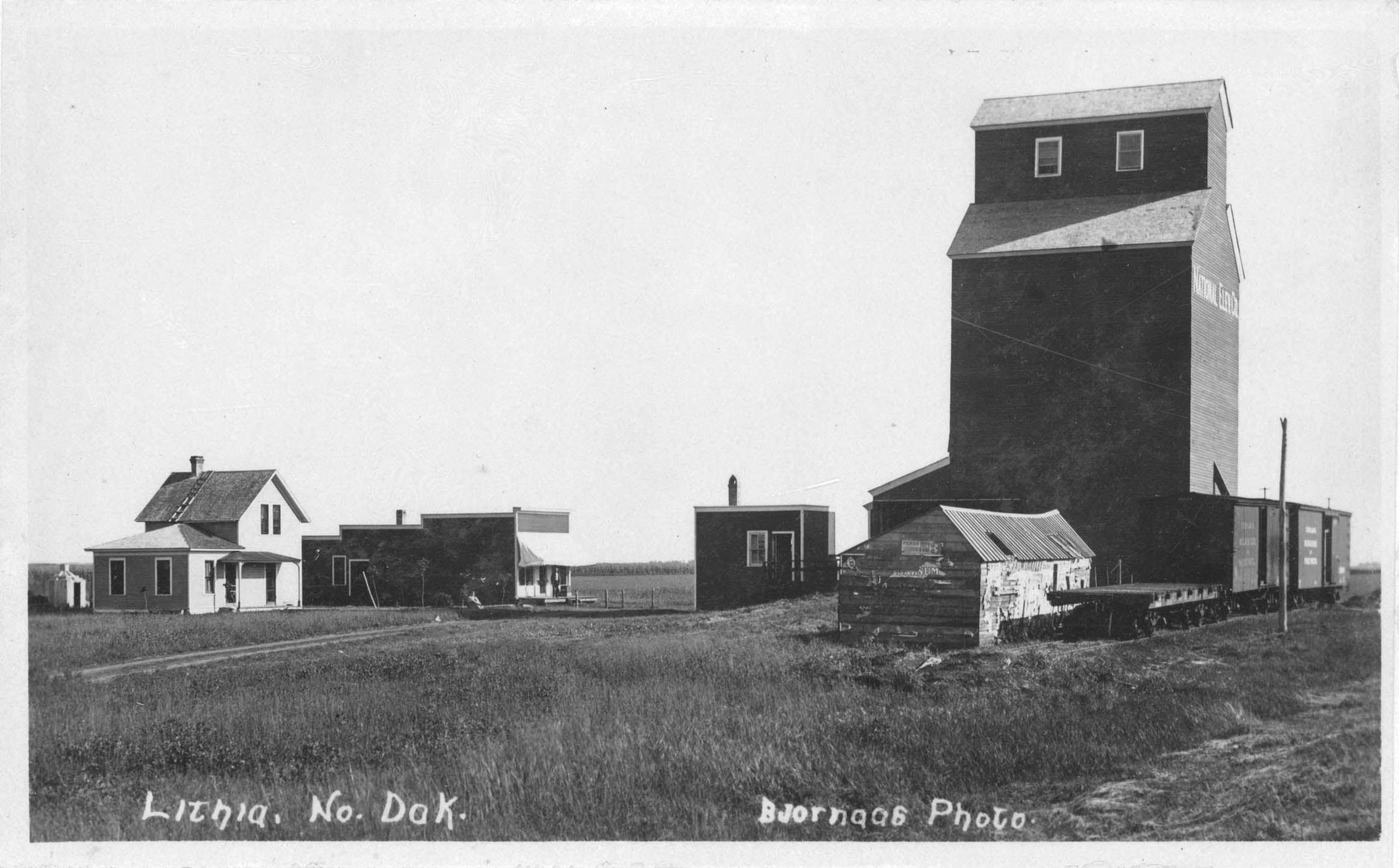
Lithia, North Dakota, grew up around the home and grain elevator of W. T. Montgomery. The community no longer exists.

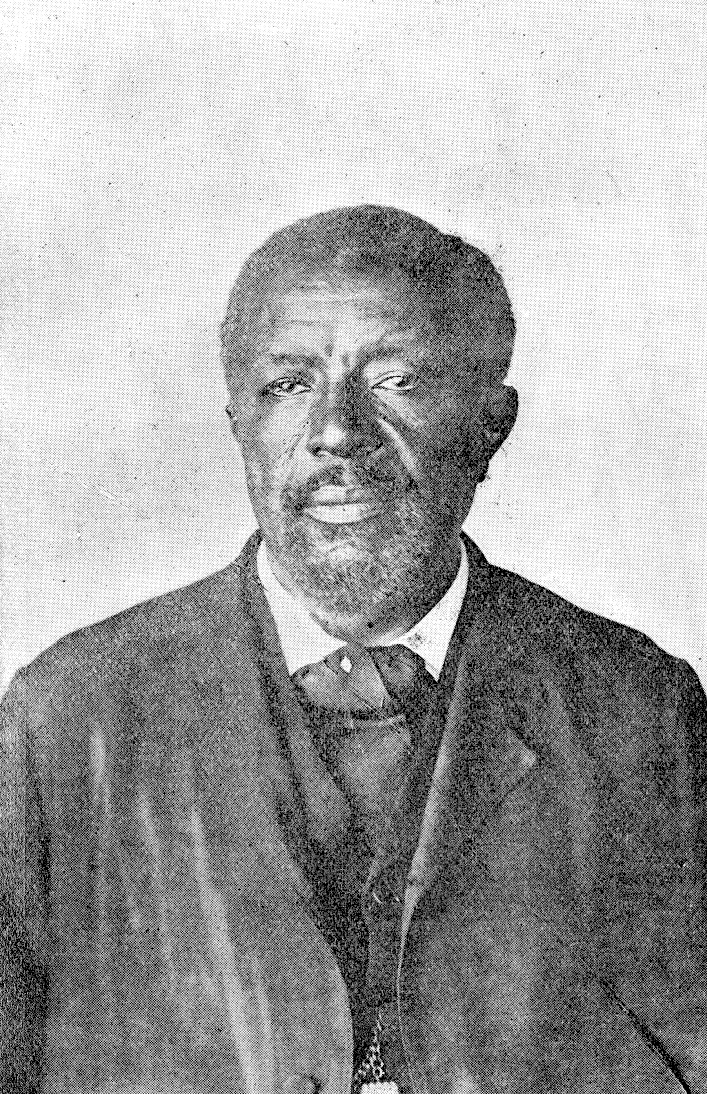
William T. Montgomery, 1907

Disheartened by the setbacks encountered within the Association, Montgomery resolved to explore new horizons. With a steadfast resolve reminiscent of his forebears' ambitions, he embarked on a fresh chapter, as articulated in a succinct passage from his autobiography: "seeking to commence anew, at the age of forty, the aspirations of youth." Opting for a departure from past failures, he shifted his focus away from the familiar landscape. Following a tenure as Warren County treasurer, he grew disenchanted with the prospects for African Americans in Mississippi, thus choosing to test his fortunes in the northern expanses of the Great Plains. In 1881, he ventured into the Dakota Territory, where he amassed significant land holdings, including 1,020 acres near Christine, North Dakota, plus more land in Cass County and Manitoba, thereby establishing himself as a prominent figure in the region's agricultural domain.

By 1884, Montgomery had settled south of Fargo in the Dakota Territory, his land intersecting with the newly laid Chicago, Milwaukee, St. Paul, and Pacific Railroad. Montgomery's farm thrived, expanding his initial 640-acre (260 ha) holding to 1,020 acres (410 ha). In 1888, Montgomery erected a grain elevator where the railroad crossed his land, around which the hamlet of Lithia emerged, serving as a crucial stop on the railroad route.

Enjoying not only financial prosperity but also harmonious race relations in his new locale, Montgomery employed the services of Scandinavian settlers to oversee his household and farm operations. Despite initial reservations among potential migrants due to the unfamiliarity with wheat cultivation and apprehensions about the harsh winters, Montgomery's success and satisfaction remained steadfast.

Soon, Montgomery became a respected farmer and businessman in the Red River Valley. The Fargo Daily Argus called him "a most worthy man" and The Appeal, a St. Paul African American newspaper, occasionally reported on the activities of "the greatest Colored farmer in the North-west." On March 19, 1892, The Appeal reported "Hon. W. T. Montgomery has returned from an extended trip through Mississippi. He reports that the low prices of cotton have placed the Afro-Americans of the South in a deplorable condition. He has for some time been endeavoring to have his brother sell out and locate in Dakota but has been unsuccessful."

While endeavoring to persuade his kin to join him in the Dakota Territory, Montgomery encountered resistance from those who doubted the realization of their dreams amidst the vast plains. Despite his attempts, the allure of the southern landscape remained strong for his brother Isaiah, who shared his restlessness but remained convinced of the impracticality of their aspirations in the Dakotas.

== Later life and death ==
By the turn of the century, Montgomery's investments in wheat futures and land in Manitoba had gone bad. In the summer of 1900, he lost his land in Richland County as well. He decided to become a citizen of Mound Bayou. William became a director of the Bank of Mound Bayou and co-founder of the Mound Bayou Loan and Investment Company.

He died on July 3, 1909, aged 66 in Mound Bayou.

== Works cited ==
- Drache, Hiram M. (1970). The Challenge of the Prairie: The Life and Times of Red River Pioneers. Fargo, North Dakota: North Dakota Institute for Regional Studies.
- Hermann, Janet Sharp (1981). The Pursuit of a Dream (1st ed.). New York: Oxford University Press.
- Turnipseed, C. S. (2016). Creating a commemorative Site on the Heritage and Memory of Cotton Pickers in the Mississippi Delta: A Community Driven Movement [PhD Dissertation]. Middle Tennessee State University.
