= Death and funeral of Jefferson Davis =

1889 funeral of the President of Confederate States

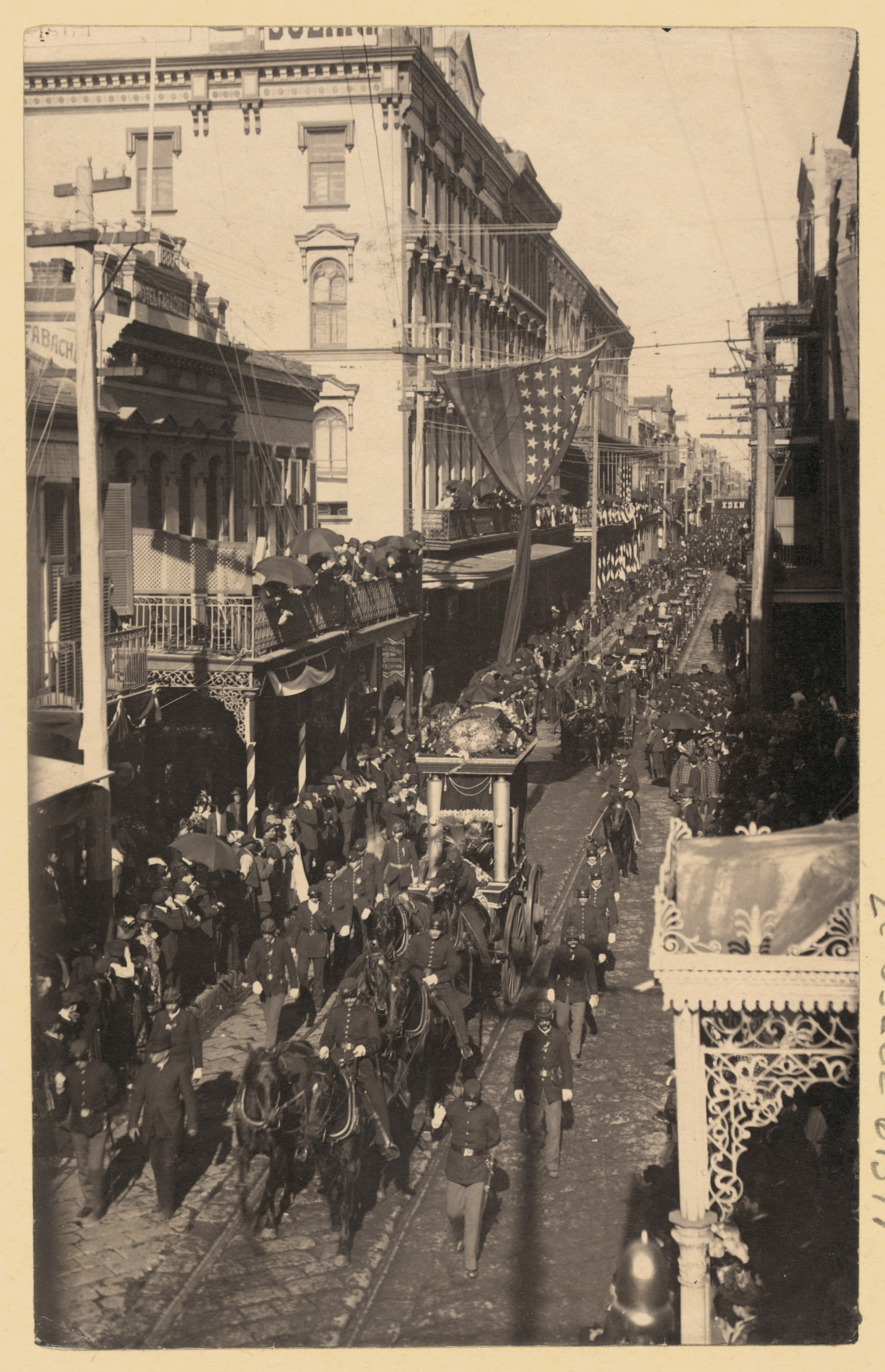
Funeral procession of Jefferson Davis in New Orleans

When Jefferson Davis died on December 6, 1889, his funeral was a major event in the United States, receiving front-page attention throughout the country. By the time of his death, Davis had become a transitional figure. He was the embodiment of the Old South, who lived long enough to be seen as emblematic of the New South. Davis's funeral and reburial is also symbolic of his problematic legacy as a leader of the Confederate States of America and its role in the perpetuation of slavery.

== Death and funeral ==
Jefferson Davis died at 12:45 a.m. on Friday, December 6, 1889. His funeral was one of the largest in the South, and New Orleans draped itself in mourning as his body lay in state in the City Hall for several days. An Executive Committee decided to emphasize his ties to the United States, so an American national flag was placed over the Confederate flag during the viewing, with many crossed American and Confederate flags nearby. Davis wore a new suit of Confederate grey fabric Jubal Early had given him, and his widow Varina placed a sword Davis had carried during the Black Hawk War on the bier. A common decoration during the initial funeral was a small American flag in mourning, with a portrait of Davis in the center. The Grand Army of the Republic had a prominent role, even though the Grand Marshall was John G. Glynn, head of the Louisiana National Guard, and Georgia Governor John Gordon (head of the newly organized United Confederate Veterans) was honorary Grand Marshall. While the federal government officially ignored Davis's death, many church bells rang in the South, Confederate veterans held many processions, and senators and representatives crossed the Potomac River to join former Confederate officials and generals in eulogizing Davis in Alexandria, Virginia.

== Burials ==
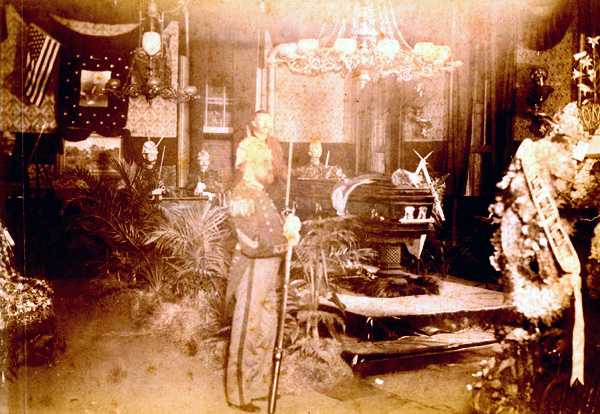
Jefferson Davis funeral casket inside New Orleans City Hall

Although initially laid to rest in New Orleans in the Army of Northern Virginia tomb at Metairie Cemetery, in 1893 Davis was reinterred in Richmond, Virginia, at Hollywood Cemetery, per his widow's request. Before his death, Davis left the location of his burial up to Varina, but within a day of his death The New York Times proclaimed Richmond wanted his body. Varina had refused to accept direct charity, but let it be known that she would accept financial help through the Davis Land Company. Soon, many tourists in New Orleans visited the mausoleum. Several other locations in the South wanted Davis's remains. Louisville, Kentucky offered a site in Cave Hill Cemetery, noting that two years earlier Davis had dedicated a church built on the site of his birthplace and claiming that he several times said he wanted to be buried in his native state. Memphis, Tennessee; Montgomery, Alabama; Macon and Atlanta, Georgia; and both Jackson and Vicksburg, Mississippi, also petitioned for his remains. Mayor of Richmond and Confederate veteran J. Taylor Ellyson established the Jefferson Davis Monument Association, and on July 12, 1891, Varina revealed in a letter to Confederate Veterans and people of the Southern States that her first choice would be Davis's plantation in Mississippi, but because she feared flooding she had decided to urge Richmond as the proper place for his tomb.

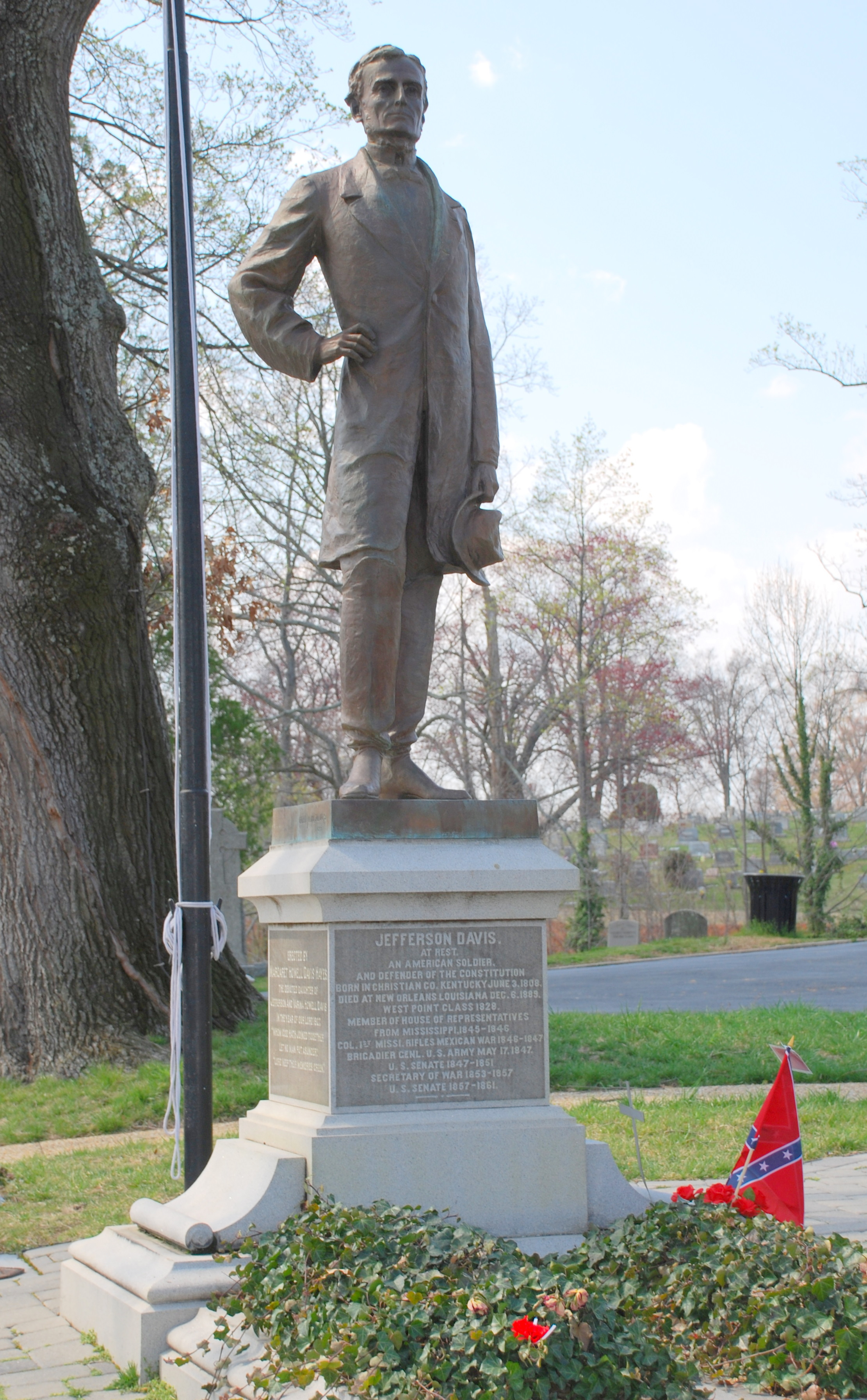
Jefferson Davis burial site at Hollywood Cemetery in Richmond, Virginia

After Davis's remains were exhumed in New Orleans, they lay in state for a day at Memorial Hall of the newly organized Louisiana Historical Association. Those paying final respects included Louisiana Governor Murphy J. Foster, Sr. A continuous cortège, day and night, then accompanied Davis's remains from New Orleans to Richmond. The Louisville and Nashville Railroad car traveled past Beauvoir, then proceeded northeastward toward Richmond, with ceremonies at stops in Mobile and Montgomery, Alabama, Atlanta, Georgia, then Charlotte and Greensboro, North Carolina. The train also detoured to Raleigh, North Carolina, for Davis's coffin to lie in state in that capital city, having been driven by James J. Jones, a free black man who had served Davis during the war and become a local businessman and politician. After a stop in Danville, Virginia, the Confederacy's last capital, and another ceremony at the Virginia State Capitol, Davis was then interred at Hollywood Cemetery in Richmond. Per the association's agreement with Varina, their children's remains were exhumed from Washington, D.C., Memphis and another plot at the Hollywood Cemetery, to rest in the new family plot.

A life-sized statue of Davis was eventually erected as promised by the Jefferson Davis Monument Association, in cooperation with the Southern Press Davis Monument Association, the United Confederate Veterans and ultimately the United Daughters of the Confederacy. The monument's cornerstone was laid in an 1896 ceremony, and it was dedicated with great pomp and 125,000 spectators on June 3, 1907, the last day of a Confederate reunion. It continues to mark his tomb.

== Legacy ==
Just before his death, Davis had travelled to Montgomery, Savannah, and Atlanta. He was greeted with enthusiasm and popular acclaim, and it solidified his image as an icon of the Old South and the Confederate cause, and making him into a symbol for the New South. Davis's funeral and burial strengthened this reputation among White Southerners at the time of his death. He came to be seen as the embodiment of what was best about the Old South. He was a hero in the Mexican–American War, a defender of the Confederacy and its rights, and a martyr who suffered unjust treatment by the federal government. Since the rise of the Civil Rights Movement, his reputation has been in decline, as his name is associated with the oppression of African Americans through slavery and the role of the Confederacy in its perpetuation. Many of the memorials dedicated to him across the country have been removed.

== Bibliography ==
- Collins, Donald E. (2005). The Death and Resurrection of Jefferson Davis. Lanham, MD: Rowman & Littlefield Publishers. ISBN 9780742543041.
- Cooper, William J. (2000). Jefferson Davis, American. Knopf. ISBN 978-0-3077-7264-0. OCLC 1035904007.
- Muldowny, John (1969). "Jefferson Davis: The postwar years". The Mississippi Quarterly. 23 (1): 17–35. JSTOR 26473833.
