= Anchuca =

Historic house in Mississippi, United States

- U.S. National Register of Historic Places
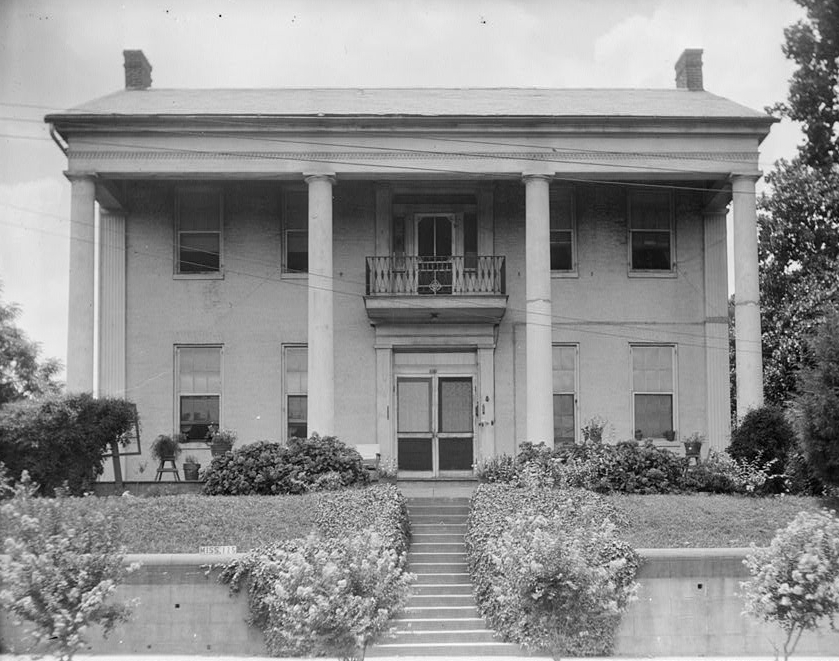
- HABS photo taken in 1936.

- Location within Mississippi
- Location: 1010 First East Street; Vicksburg, Mississippi
- Coordinates: 32°21′15.62″N 90°52′38.93″W
- Built: 1830
- Architectural style: Federal, Greek Revival
- NRHP reference No.: 82003113
- Added to NRHP: 22 March 1982

Anchuca, also known as the Victor Wilson House, is a historic Greek Revival house located in Vicksburg, Mississippi, United States. The name is purported to mean "happy home" in the Choctaw language.

== History ==
The house was built in 1830 in the Federal style by J. W. Mauldin, a local politician. In 1840 a local merchant, Victor Wilson, bought the house. He and his wife, Jane, had a two-story portico added to the front of the house in 1847 to reflect the Greek Revival style.

Despite its proximity to the Confederate lines and to the Yazoo and Mississippi Rivers, the house survived the Siege of Vicksburg in 1863. The house was used as a hospital after the battle.

Joseph Emory Davis, Jefferson Davis' older brother and mentor, and a granddaughter lived in the house from 1868 until his death on 18 September 1870. He had regained possession of his plantations at Davis Bend after the war, but the peninsula was cut off from the mainland in 1867 when the Mississippi changed its course, and agriculture became unprofitable because of transportation costs. Jefferson Davis made one of his last public addresses to the people of Vicksburg in 1869 from the front balcony of the house.

When the house was surveyed by the Historic American Buildings Survey in 1936, it was owned by Mrs. William Joseph Vollor. As of 2008 it serves as a bed and breakfast inn, with suites in the main house, servant's quarters, and carriage house.

== See also ==
- List of Registered Historic Places in Mississippi
