= Davis Island (Mississippi) =

River island in the Mississippi River, United States

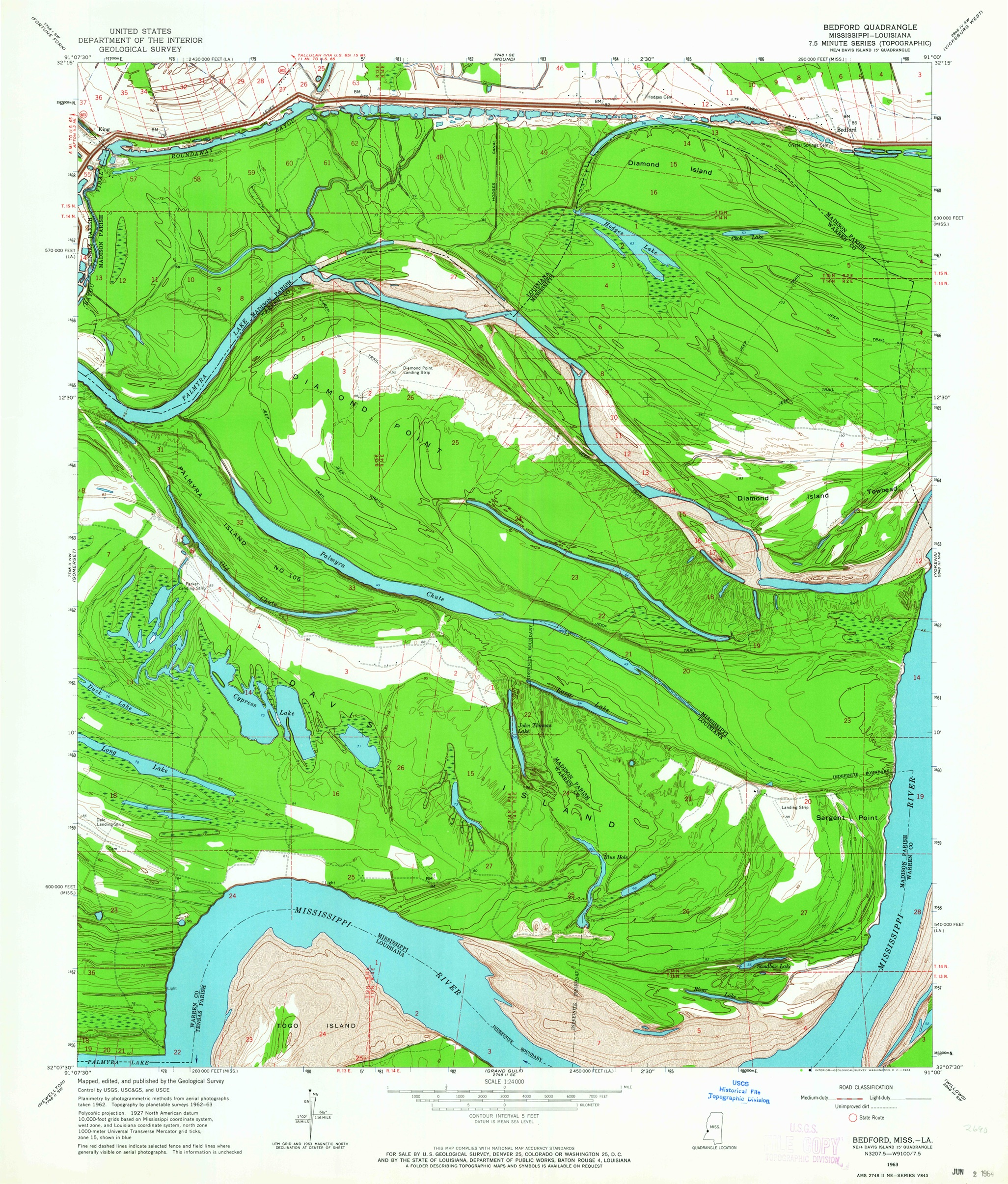
- Quadrangle for Bedford, MS 1963

- Location in Mississippi and Louisiana Davis Island (Mississippi) (Louisiana)

Geography
- Location: Mississippi River
- Coordinates: 32°09′43″N 91°04′28″W

Administration
- United States
- States: Warren County, Mississippi; Madison Parish, Louisiana

Additional information
- Formerly known as Davis Bend

Davis Island is a large island located in the Mississippi River. It lies mostly in Warren County in the state of Mississippi but is also partly in Madison Parish, in the state of Louisiana. It is located about 20 miles southwest of Vicksburg, Mississippi, USA. The island is approximately 30,000 acres (120 km^{2}) in size depending on the level of the Mississippi River. It was formerly a peninsula known as Davis Bend, with an 11,000 acres (45 km^{2}) area of rich bottomlands, bounded on three sides by the Mississippi River.

Before the American Civil War, Joseph Davis developed his 5,000 acres (20 km^{2}) Hurricane Plantation for cotton production on the peninsula. He worked to develop a model slave community, providing more autonomy to his slaves, for instance allowing them to keep a certain portion of monies they earned. He bought the land in 1818. In the 1830s he allowed his much younger brother (by 23 years), future Confederate President Jefferson Davis, the use of an adjoining 1,000 acres (4.0 km^{2}). There, the younger Davis developed Brierfield Plantation. Joseph never gave the younger Davis title to that land, which caused legal problems after his death in 1870.

The peninsula was separated from the mainland by a shift in the river in March 1867, after which it was an island accessible only by water. After the war, Davis provided a mortgage to Ben Montgomery, his former slave who had managed his plantation, and other freedmen, to acquire both plantations. They operated them for several years, but declining cotton prices, economic hard times in the financial panic, and the repeated flooding caused failure. Davis heirs foreclosed on the note, forcing Montgomery descendants and others to leave the island.

After several years of litigation, in 1878 Jefferson Davis gained legal possession of Brierfield plantation from his brother's heirs. He never lived at the plantation again; both he and other Davis family members leased the properties to tenant farmers. Their only access was by water. As of 1887 there were a number of working plantations in and around Davis Island, which also had " a beautiful lake some eighteen or twenty miles in length. Along the shores of this lake, on both sides, may be found some fine plantations, among which are the Palmyra place, upper and lower, at the head of the island, adjoining which are the Ingomar, Waverly and Lake places, belonging to Col. W. S. Lovell. On the opposite side is Killecrankie, owned by Mr. T. S. Coons...Then comes Ion and Woodburn, belonging to the Citizens Bank, New Orleans, and once the property of Mr. Joshua James, whose fine residence was destroyed by fire during Grant's march to Bruinsburg. Still lower down comes Somerset, of the Perkins estate, now leased by Messrs. Bedford and O'Kelly, who are extensively engaged in the planting interest. Again, on the Mississippi side Hurricane, own by Mrs. Hamer. Adjoining this is Briarfield, the property of Hon. Jefferson Davis. Then the Ursino place at the lower end of the lane, recently leased by Mr. Jno. B. O'Kelly. Directly opposite on the Louisiana [side], there is what is left of Point Pleasant, owned by K. and A. W. Turner, and the Bura by Messrs. McMillan and Guthrie. All of these places frout on the lake, and are in cultivation."

Following the Great Mississippi Flood of 1927, which inundated nearly 30,000 square miles (78,000 km^{2}), the US Army Corps of Engineers raised the height of the levees to try to prevent such damage in the future. This had the unintended consequence of increasing the severity of flooding of Davis Island. It has been under water more than once. The Davis family finally sold the properties in 1953, and the private Brierfield Hunting Club has controlled most of the island since then. Access is only by water or by a grass airstrip.
