= Ben Montgomery =

American businessman (1819–1877)

- Born: Benjamin Thornton Montgomery c. 1819; Loudoun County, Virginia, US
- Died: 1877 (aged 57–58)
- Occupations: Inventor, landowner, and freedman
- Known for: Steam-operated propeller
- Children: 5, including: William Thornton Montgomery; Isaiah Montgomery
- Relatives: Mary Booze (granddaughter)

Benjamin Thornton Montgomery (c. 1819–1877) was an American inventor, landowner, and freedman in Mississippi. He learned to read and write and became manager of supply and shipping for Joseph Emory Davis at Hurricane Plantation at Davis Bend.

== Early life and family ==
Ben Montgomery was born into slavery in 1819 in Loudoun County, Virginia. In 1837, he was sold south, and purchased in Natchez, Mississippi, by Joseph Emory Davis. He was taken to Hurricane Plantation, the home of Davis and his wife, Eliza. The planter's much younger brother, Jefferson Davis, later became the President of the Confederate States of America. Montgomery escaped but was recaptured. Davis reportedly "inquired closely into the cause of his dissatisfaction", whereby the two men reached a "mutual understanding" about Montgomery's situation.

Davis's "utopian experiment" of the plantation on Davis Bend was centered on his idea that "the less people are governed, the more submissive they will be to control." The enslaved were encouraged to learn trades that interested them, and Davis allowed them to keep extra money they made in their chosen skilled work, rare among Southern slave owners. It was illegal to teach an enslaved person how to read and write in Mississippi, but Davis encouraged it. Montgomery was taught reading, writing, and arithmetic, and was assigned to run the plantation's general store. Impressed by the talent Montgomery displayed, Davis gave him the responsibility of managing purchasing and shipping for the entire plantation.

Montgomery and his wife, Mary Virginia Lewis, whom he married in 1840, had five children. Two daughters, Rebecca and Virginia, and two sons, William Thornton Montgomery (born 1843), and Isaiah Montgomery (born May 21, 1847), reached adulthood. Purchasing his wife's time from Davis, he was able to allow his children to be raised by Mary, and the children received an education and had access to the library. Their son William, after serving as county treasurer in Warren County, Mississippi, would later move to Dakota Territory, where he purchased a significant amount of property, working as a farmer and a businessman in the Red River Valley. Isaiah went on to found the black community of Mound Bayou, Mississippi, and "pursued racial harmony through accommodation" in his participation in the 1890 Mississippi constitutional convention; Isaiah's daughter Mary Booze was a political organizer.

== Career ==
Montgomery learned a variety of skills, including reading, writing, land surveying, flood control, architectural design, machine repair, and steamboat navigation. Montgomery developed proficiencies in many areas; he became a skilled mechanic, not only repairing the advanced agricultural machinery acquired by the Davis brothers, but eventually applied for a patent for his design of a steam-operated propeller to provide propulsion to boats in shallow water.

The propeller could cut into the water at different angles, thus allowing the boat to navigate more easily through shallow water. This was not a new invention, but an improvement on similar designs invented by John Stevens in 1804 and John Ericsson in 1838. (U.S. patent 588) On June 10, 1858, on the basis that Ben, as a slave, was not a citizen of the United States, and thus could not apply for a patent in his name, he was denied this patent application in a ruling by the United States Attorney General's office. It ruled that neither slaves nor their owners could receive patents on inventions devised by slaves because slaves were not considered citizens and the slave owners were not the inventors. Later, both Joseph and Jefferson Davis attempted to patent the device in their names but were denied because they were not the "true inventor." After Jefferson Davis later was selected as President of the Confederacy, he signed into law the legislation that would allow slaves to receive patent protection for their inventions. On June 28, 1864, Montgomery, no longer a slave, filed a patent application for his device, but the patent office again rejected his application.

Joseph Davis allowed captive Africans on his plantation to retain money earned commercially, so long as they paid him for the labor they would have done as farmworkers. Thus, Montgomery was able to accumulate wealth, run a business, and create a personal library.

== Ownership of Davis Bend ==
The Davis family left Davis Bend in 1862, ahead of oncoming troops from the Union Army. Montgomery assumed control of the plantation. Farming continued despite difficulties created by the war, such as attacks from the military forces of both sides. For a time, he worked for Union Admiral David D. Porter.

Following the end of the American Civil War, Joseph Davis sold his plantation and property to Montgomery, in 1866, for the sum of $300,000 (~$5.17 million in 2025) as part of a long-term loan.

In September 1867, Montgomery became the first Afro-American official elected in Mississippi, when he was elected justice of the peace of Davis Bend. Under his supervision, the plantation produced cotton judged to be the best in the world at an International Exposition in 1870.

With his son Isaiah, Montgomery established a general store known as Montgomery and Sons. Montgomery worked toward his lifelong dream of establishing a community for freed slaves. He never lived to see his dream come to fruition. Catastrophic floods ruined the crops and cut a channel across the peninsula, turning Davis Bend into an island. This added to the expenses of getting supplies to the plantation and crops to market. When Montgomery failed to make a payment on the loan in 1876, Davis Bend automatically reverted to the Davis family as per the terms of the original contract. Heartbroken, Montgomery died the next year. He was interred in Brierfield Plantation Cemetery, Le Tourneau, Warren County, Mississippi.

== Legacy ==
After his father's death, Isaiah Montgomery worked to realize his dream. He purchased 840 acres (3.4 km^{2}) between the Vicksburg and Memphis railroad lines in northwest Mississippi for the purpose of establishing the community of freed slaves his father dreamed of. Along with other former slaves, Isaiah Montgomery established the town of Mound Bayou, Mississippi; in 1887 and developed it as a majority African-American community.
