= Varina Anne Davis =

American writer (1864–1898)

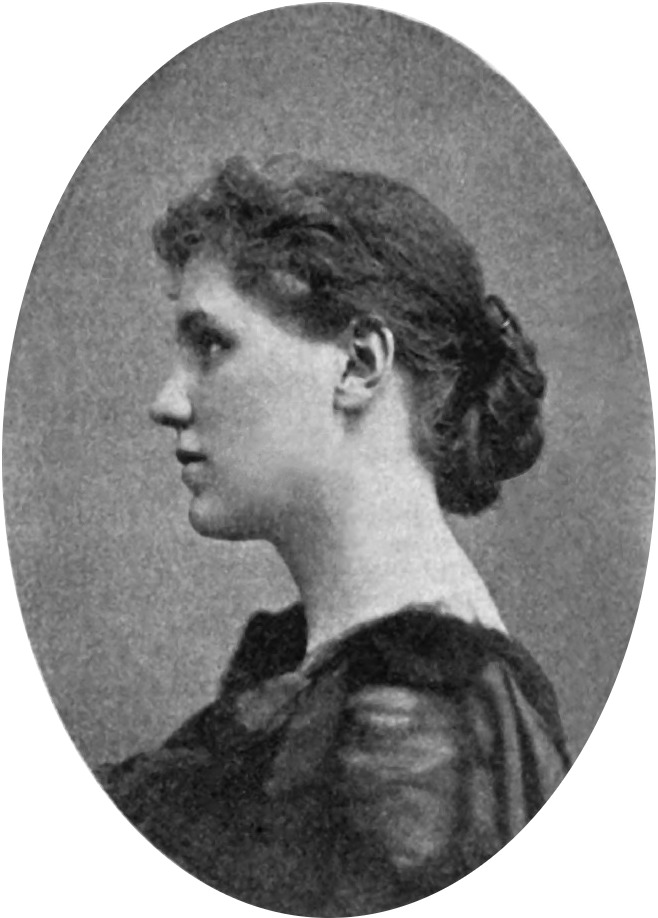
- Born: June 27, 1864; Richmond, Virginia, C.S.
- Died: September 18, 1898 (aged 34); Narragansett Pier, Rhode Island, U.S.
- Occupation: Writer
- Parents: Jefferson Davis (father); Varina Howell (mother)

Varina Anne Davis (known as Winnie; June 27, 1864 – September 18, 1898) was an American author who is best known as the youngest daughter of President Jefferson Davis of the Confederate States of America and Varina (Howell) Davis. Born near the end of the Civil War, by the late 1880s she became known as the "Daughter of the Confederacy". Later in the 1880s, she appeared with her father on behalf of Confederate veterans' groups. After his death, she and her mother moved in 1891 to New York City, where they both worked as writers. She published a biography and two novels, in addition to numerous articles. Varina Davis died from an infectious disease at age 34.

== Childhood ==
Varina Anne "Winnie" Davis was born one year before the end of the American Civil War in the White House of the Confederacy in Richmond, Virginia. She was the second daughter and the sixth child of Varina Banks (Howell) Davis and Jefferson F. Davis. The youngest, she was the only child of the family who was allowed to visit her father in Fort Monroe with her mother during his two years of imprisonment that followed the Civil War. They eventually were given an apartment in the officers' quarters to use.

Winnie was home-educated by her parents in her early years. She later accompanied her parents on their numerous journeys. At the age of thirteen, she was sent to the Misses Friedländers School in Karlsruhe, Germany. She studied for five years in the renowned boarding school, in that time acquiring a slight German accent. Later, she studied in Paris for a short while before returning to the United States.

== Daughter of the Confederacy ==
During the 1880s, Winnie lived with her parents at Beauvoir, their Gulf Coast estate near Biloxi, Mississippi. It was bequeathed to Jefferson Davis in 1878 by Sarah Anne Ellis Dorsey, a wealthy widow and supporter of the Confederacy. In 1886, Winnie and her aging father visited West Point, Georgia, on a tour of the South promoting his books and the Lost Cause of the Confederacy.

On April 24, 1886, Governor John Brown Gordon called Davis "The Daughter of the Confederacy". This title stuck, and Winnie became an icon for Confederate veteran groups and an inspiration for the United Daughters of the Confederacy, which formed in 1894. Together with her father, she made public appearances and speeches, and acted more and more as his representative. Confederate groups, including women's associations, worked to fund and organize cemeteries, memorialize the war and its soldiers, and honor the "Lost Cause" of the South.

In 1888, Winnie published her first book, a monograph on Irish revolutionary Robert Emmet titled An Irish Knight of the 19th Century.

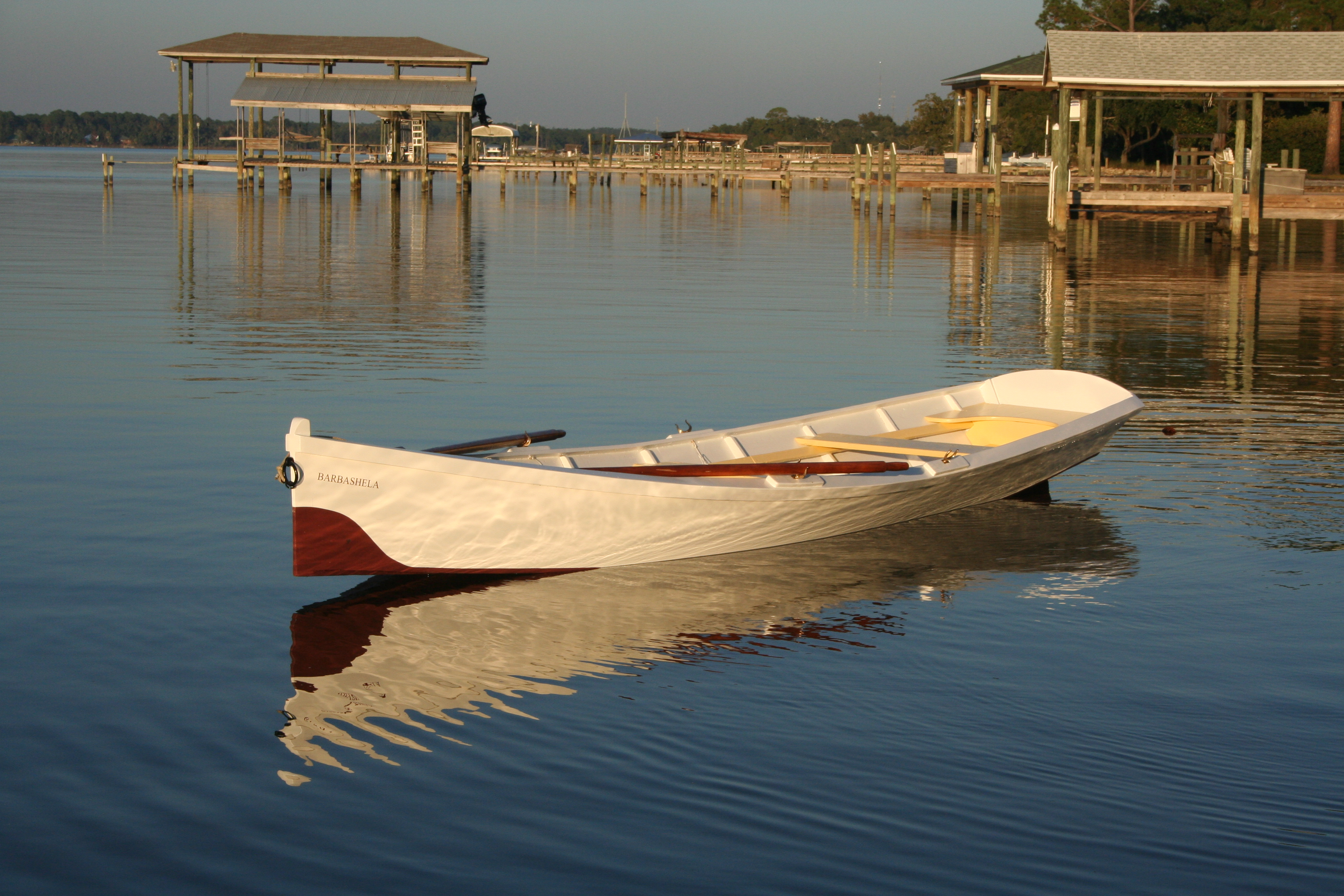
Winnie Davis' 1880s skiff Barbashela, restored 2016

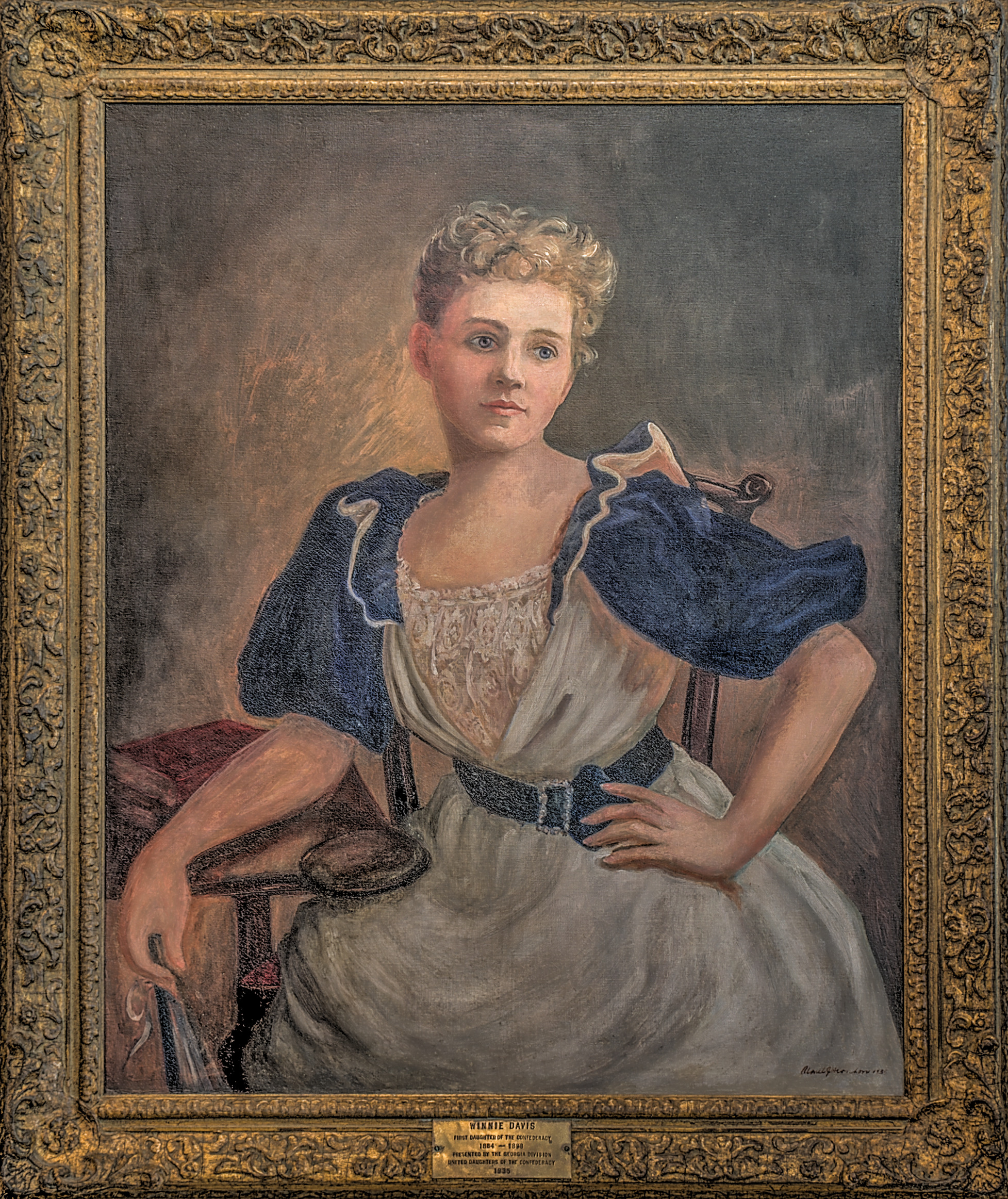
Painting on display at the Jefferson Davis Memorial Historic Site

Davis was involved in a few well-known romantic relationships, but she never married. In 1885 – 1886, she may have been courted by the noted landscape and portrait artist Verner Moore White, but the relationship supposedly ended when White moved to Europe to further his studies in art. This relationship has never been directly verified.

In 1887, Davis developed a more serious relationship with Alfred Wilkinson, a successful New York attorney, whom she met while staying with family friends in Syracuse, New York during the late fall of 1886. Her mother met Wilkinson and initially approved the match, but her father disapproved, based on Wilkinson being from the North and his grandfather having been an abolitionist. Davis reconsidered his disapproval after meeting Wilkinson, and the engagement of the couple was announced in 1889. Northern papers publicized it as healing the wounds of the Civil War. However, an outcry against it in the Southern United States burdened the romance, for some dreamed that the young Davis would marry a prominent Southerner, preferably a descendant of one of the generals.

Jefferson Davis died shortly before the announced wedding date, and mourning custom required postponing the nuptials for a year. During this time, Wilkinson's house burned down. Winnie's mother, Varina, became opposed to the marriage. Her Southern friends considered the relationship an insult to the Davis legacy. More importantly, her husband had left the widowed Varina in financial difficulties, and she worried that Wilkinson would be unable to support Winnie. This concern was incorrect, but the damage was done. The engagement was ended in October 1890.

By 1891, Varina Davis moved with her daughter to New York City, deeming the climate of Mississippi unhealthy. Richmond, Virginia had offered them a home, but both women realized they needed to work to support themselves financially. The widowed Varina had neither a pension nor signing authority with respect to what remained of Davis's estate. Mother and daughter both became correspondents for the New York World, a newspaper owned by Joseph Pulitzer, a good friend of the Davis family who was married to Kate Pulitzer, a distant Davis cousin and friend of Varina's. The Davis women lived in a series of residential hotels, eventually settling at the Gerard Hotel in what is now the Theater District.

During this time, Davis also wrote for national magazines, such as The Ladies Home Journal. She published two novels: The Veiled Doctor: A Novel (reprinted 2015) and a A Romance of Summer Seas (1898, reprinted 2009). Both books were moderately successful.

== Death ==
In July 1898, Winnie Davis became deathly ill. She had been soaked in a rainstorm at a Confederate Veterans' Reunion in Atlanta, Georgia, then traveled by train to meet her mother in Narragansett Pier, Rhode Island. They vacationed there annually in the summer at the fashionable Rockingham Hotel. Doctors diagnosed Davis with "malarial gastritis". She had already suffered for years from gastritis. Davis suffered for weeks from fever, chills, and loss of appetite. The Rockingham Hotel closed for the season in early September, but the management allowed Davis and her mother to stay on. Davis died there on September 18, 1898. She was 34 years old.

Her mother arranged for her daughter to be buried in Richmond's Hollywood Cemetery, with military honors because of her service to Confederate veterans' groups. She was laid next to the graves of her father and brothers, who had been reinterred there.

Davis was survived by her mother and by her sister, Margaret Addison Hayes, then living in Colorado Springs, Colorado, with her husband Joel Addison Hayes, and her sister's children. Among their several children was a daughter, Varina Howell Davis Hayes. The younger Varina later married Gerald Bertram Webb. Among their children was a daughter named Varina Margaret Webb.

== Works ==
- Davis, Varina Ann (1888). An Irish Knight of the Nineteenth Century. New York: John W. Lovell Company.
- "Foreign Education for American Girls" (1889), monograph
- Davis, Varina Anne (1895). The Veiled Doctor – A Novel. New York: Harper & Brothers, Publishers.
- A Romance of Summer Seas (1898), novel

== Biography ==
- Mary Craig Sinclair, The Romance History of Winnie Davis (unpublished)
- Heath Hardage Lee, Winnie Davis: Daughter of the Lost Cause, University of Nebraska Press, Potomac Press: 2014

== See also ==
- Ellen Barnes McGinnis, Varina's nurse when growing up in the Confederate White House

== Sources ==
- Ferrell, Chiles Clifton (1899). 'The Daughter of the Confederacy' – Her Life, Character, and Writings. Mississippi Historical Society.
- "Varina Anne Davis, The Papers of Jefferson Davis". Rice University. Archived from the original on April 28, 2015.
- "Varina Anne Davis". essortment.com.
- "Leathers 21 Rowboat Barbashela". smallboatrestoration.blogspot.com.
