= Eliza Van Benthuysen Davis =

19th-century American planter and letter writer

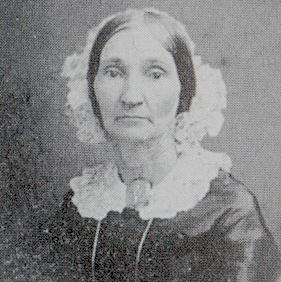
- Davis circa 1859
- Born: Eliza Jane Van Benthuysen; January 23, 1811
- Died: October 24, 1863 (aged 52); Vicksburg, Mississippi, U.S.
- Resting place: Brierfield Plantation
- Spouse: Joseph Emory Davis (1827–1863; her death)
- Parent(s): Benjamin Van Benthuysen; Catherine Freeman
- Relatives: Jefferson Davis (brother-in-law); Varina Davis (sister-in-law)

Eliza Jane Van Benthuysen Davis (January 23, 1811 – October 24, 1863) was an American planter, letter writer, and the châtelaine of Hurricane Plantation. She was married to Joseph Emory Davis, the older brother of Confederate President Jefferson Davis.

== Biography ==
Davis was born Eliza Jane Van Benthuysen on January 23, 1811, to Benjamin Van Benthuysen and Catherine Freeman Van Benthuysen, both Dutch Americans from New York. Her widowed mother owned a shoe and boot store and later ran a boarding house in New Orleans.

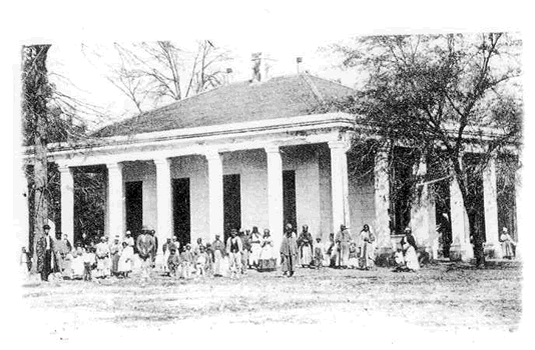
Hurricane Plantation, the Davis family home

In 1827, When she was sixteen years old, she married the forty-three-year-old Joseph Emory Davis in Natchez. Her husband, a planter and retired lawyer, was the older brother of Confederate President Jefferson Davis. She and Davis had no biological children together, but they took in his three illegitimate daughters from premarital relationships and adopted two children, Joseph D. Nicholson and Martha Quarles. The Davis family owned Hurricane Plantation, a 5,000-acre plantation along the Mississippi River in Davis Bend, Mississippi. They enslaved over three hundred sixty people on the plantation.

Davis wrote letters throughout her married life, many of which are now kept in the library collection of the University of Alabama. In 1859, Davis traveled to the United Kingdom and wrote letters, from London and Glasgow, to members of her family.

In 1862, during the American Civil War, the Davis home at Hurricane Plantation was burned to the ground by Union forces. The plantation was looted multiple times by both the Union Army and the Confederate States Army during the Vicksburg campaign.

Davis died on October 24, 1863. She was buried in the cemetery at Brierfield Plantation.

== Works cited ==
- Hermann, Janet Sharp (1990). Joseph E. Davis: Pioneer Patriarch. University Press of Mississippi. ISBN 9781617032806.
