= Hurricane Plantation =

Jefferson Davis plantation

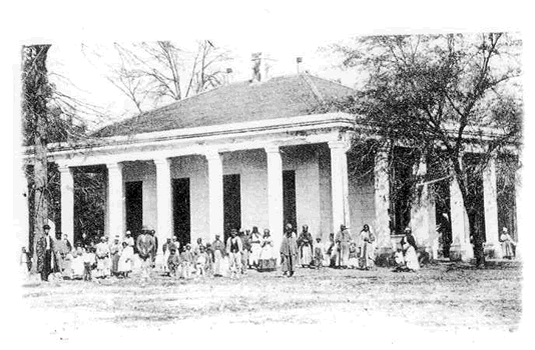
- The library pavilion at Hurricane, one of the few structures to survive the destruction of the main house by Federal troops.

- Location within Mississippi
- 32.16681°N 91.14816°W
- Location: Davis Bend, Mississippi

History
- Founded: 1824
- Built: 1827
- Built for: Joseph Emory Davis
- Demolished: June 24, 1862 (main house and most buildings burned)

Site notes
- Architectural style: Neoclassical
- Governing body: Private

Hurricane Plantation was a plantation house located near Vicksburg, Mississippi, was the home of Joseph Emory Davis (1784–1870), the oldest brother of Jefferson Davis. Located on a peninsula of the Mississippi River in Warren County, Mississippi, called Davis Bend after its owner, Hurricane Plantation at its peak in the antebellum era comprised more than 5,000 acres (20 km^{2}) with approximately 5 miles (8.0 km) of river frontage. Joseph Davis enslaved 346 people to force work the plantation land. He had a personal worth of more than US$600,000 in the 1860 U.S. Census, making him one of the wealthiest men in the state of Mississippi during this time.

== History ==
The main house at Hurricane was two stories, with two large semi-detached wings for entertaining, and a detached library. There were also numerous outbuildings typical of a plantation of that scale. The residence was described in detail by Varina Davis (Jefferson Davis's second wife), in a memoir of her husband.

Davis lived at Hurricane with his wife, Eliza Van Benthuysen Davis, his three illegitimate daughters, and his two adopted children. He had served as surrogate father and de facto guardian for his brother Jefferson Davis, who was 23 years younger. In the 1830s, Joseph Davis gave Jefferson the full use of more than 1,000 acres (4.0 km^{2}) adjoining Hurricane. Jefferson Davis developed a plantation here, naming it Brierfield. Specific details of the arrangement are uncertain, as Joseph Davis retained ownership of the land. Jefferson Davis, and later his second wife and children with him, occupied Brierfield until the beginning of the Civil War in 1861.

After the fall of New Orleans to Federal troops and the increasing military presence near Vicksburg, Davis relocated from Hurricane Plantation with members of his family and some of his enslaved people to Tuscaloosa, Alabama.

The main house of Hurricane Plantation was burned by Federal troops in 1862, and the plantation looted numerous times by both armies during the campaign of Vicksburg. Only the library, a building independent of the main house, survived the war.

After the war Davis sold the property to Ben Montgomery, a former enslaved person whom Davis had assigned before the war as manager of his plantation, and a group of freedmen. They financed the sale by a long-term note. Davis died in 1870. He was buried in the Davis Family cemetery on Davis Island, but his gravestone has been damaged.

He had several legally acknowledged illegitimate daughters, but no legitimate children. His heirs foreclosed on the note with Montgomery & Sons, after they were unable to make payments due to declining cotton prices and losses because of years of floods (1867, 1868, 1871, and 1874) that damaged the property. Montgomery died in 1877.

Confusion as to the titles of the Hurricane and Brierfield properties led to lawsuits for control between Jefferson Davis and his brother's heirs. Jefferson ultimately gained title to the Brierfield property in 1878 but never lived there again. Joseph Davis's grandchildren (from one of his legally acknowledged illegitimate daughters) received Hurricane.

Briarfield and Hurricane Plantations along the Mississippi, mapped approximately 1866

A canal had been cut across the peninsula for flood control. It was claimed by the Mississippi River in 1867 as the main channel when a major flood changed its route. The former peninsula was renamed as Davis Island.

The main buildings of Brierfield Plantation burned down in 1931. Despite increasing damage from floods, the Davis family retained the properties until 1953. It was sold and quickly flipped to a lawyer from Vidalia, Louisiana, who reserved it for hunting. His heirs have continued to use it as private hunting land.
