= Joseph Emory Davis =

American lawyer and plantation owner

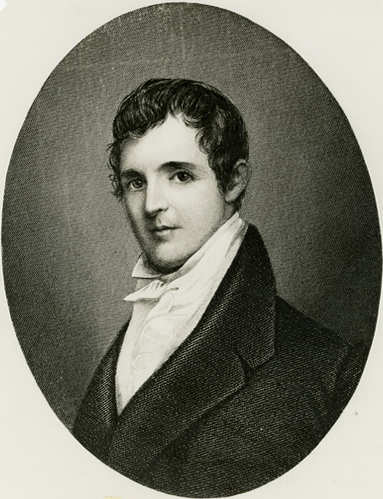
- Born: 10 December 1784; Wilkes County, Georgia, U.S.
- Died: 18 September 1870 (aged 85); Vicksburg, Mississippi, U.S.
- Occupations: Attorney and planter
- Known for: One of the wealthiest planters in Mississippi; brother of Jefferson Davis, President of the Confederacy
- Spouse: Eliza Van Benthuysen
- Children: Three acknowledged natural daughters; two adopted children
- Relatives: Jefferson Davis (brother); Varina Davis (sister-in-law)

Joseph Emory Davis (10 December 1784 – 18 September 1870) was an American lawyer who became one of the wealthiest planters in Mississippi in the antebellum era; he owned thousands of acres of land and was among the nine men in Mississippi who owned more than 300 slaves. He was the elder brother (by 23 years) of Jefferson Davis and acted as his surrogate father for several years. The younger Davis became a politician, U.S. Senator, and later President of the Confederacy.

In the 1820s, Joseph Davis developed the Hurricane Plantation at Davis Bend, Mississippi.

He left the plantations in 1862 during the American Civil War, but they continued to operate under Union direction, as well as to house black soldiers and refugees. After the war, Davis received a pardon and regained his lands. But, in the 1867 spring floods, the Mississippi River cut a new channel across the peninsula and transformed Davis Bend into Davis Island. Davis moved to Vicksburg, selling the plantation to Benjamin Montgomery, his former slave who had been an outstanding manager. Davis encouraged him in making a community of freedmen.

== Early life ==
Joseph Emory Davis was born on 10 December 1784, near Augusta, Georgia. He was the oldest of the ten children of Samuel Emory Davis (Philadelphia, Philadelphia County, Province of Pennsylvania, 1756 - 4 July 1824) and wife (1783) Jane (Cook) Davis (Christian County (later Todd County), Kentucky, 1759 - 3 October 1845), paternal grandson of Evan Davis (Cardiff, Glamorgan, Wales, Great Britain, 1729 - 1758) and wife Lydia Emory, and maternal grandson of William Cook and wife Sarah Simpson, daughter of Samuel Simpson (1706 - 1791) and wife Hannah ... (1710 -). Samuel farmed in Georgia, but in 1793 the Davis family (by then consisting of the couple, four sons, and a daughter) set out for the newly formed state of Kentucky, where the land was more promising. In Kentucky, four more daughters were born, and lastly son Jefferson in 1808. Joseph was 23 years older than Jefferson.

== Legal career ==
At an early age, Joseph Davis began working in a mercantile house. He studied law in Russellville and in Wilkinson County, Mississippi, where he accompanied his father in 1811 to explore the area. He was admitted to the bar in 1812 and first practiced in Pinckneyville, Mississippi. He also worked as an attorney in Greenville.

He served as delegate from Jefferson County in the convention that wrote the Mississippi state constitution in 1817.

In 1820 Davis moved to the river port of Natchez, Mississippi, where he formed a law partnership with Thomas B. Reed, then the leader of the Mississippi bar. They prospered in Natchez.

== Personal life ==
While building his fortune, Davis fathered three illegitimate daughters, born 1811 through 1823. It was not unusual for unmarried men to have relationships and children before marriage. It is not known if the daughters had the same mother. Davis acknowledged them publicly, arranged for them to be educated, supported them, and brought them to live in his household for periods of time. Each of the three girls eventually married, aided by their father's wealth and status. They were Florida Ann Davis (b. 31 March 1811, d. 18 January 1891, Warren County, Mississippi); Mary Lucinda Davis (b. 1 May 1816, d. 22 November 1846, near Vicksburg, Mississippi); and Caroline Davis (b. c. 1823 – d. 13 July 1907, Williamsburg, Virginia).

In 1827, the 43-year-old Davis decided to marry and retire from law. He used his savings to buy land and slaves to become a planter. That year he married Eliza Van Benthuysen (1811–1863) in Natchez; she was 16 years old. Her widowed mother had owned a shoe and boot store in the city, but at the time of the marriage ran a boardinghouse in New Orleans.

Davis also adopted two children, Joseph D. Nicholson, the infant son of Mrs. Jane Nicholson, and Martha Quarles, daughter of John Quarles. Martha Quarles was the granddaughter of Martha Brooks Wallace. Martha Wallace reared her until age 13 when the girl started living in Davis's household.

He was a friend of Margaret Louisa Kempe Howell, whom he had known in his youth, serving as a groomsman at her wedding and accompanying her on a trip to New York. Howell's daughter, Varina, later married Davis's brother.

== Mississippi planter ==
As a cotton planter Davis made a fortune, becoming "one of the richest men in Mississippi at the onset of the Civil War." He acquired an extensive amount of land and hundreds of slaves. In the late 1820s, he acquired nearly all the land on a peninsula that came to be known as Davis Bend. It was about 15 miles south of Vicksburg, also on the Mississippi River. By 1860 at the beginning of the American Civil War, his Hurricane Plantation included 5,000 acres and 5 miles of riverfront. Davis, Eliza, and his three natural daughters had first lived in a relatively modest house he had built at Davis Bend in 1827. Later Davis had a much larger structure built, which was started in 1835. It was a three-story brick mansion, finished in stucco. Large fireplaces heated the twelve rooms in winter. There were also numerous outbuildings. Davis also acquired one of the best private libraries in the South. This plantation was considered one of the finest establishments on the Mississippi River.

Davis gave his much younger brother Jefferson Davis an adjacent 1,000 acres, which he developed as Brierfield Plantation. The senior Davis sold some land to other preferred neighbors. Davis Bend was surrounded on three sides by the river. While cotton was Joseph Davis' chief cash crop, his plantation produced other crops, as well as a variety of meats. It was nearly self-sufficient. He had large herds of dairy and beef cattle and was the only planter on the peninsula to have sheep.

In 1860 Joseph E. Davis held 365 slaves. He was one of nine planters in Mississippi to hold more than 300 slaves. They cultivated 1700 acres of improved land at Hurricane Plantation.

Davis worked to create a utopian plantation on a paternalistic model, borrowing from industrial ideas of Robert Owen. He provided improved living conditions and increased autonomy for the slaves, including establishing a plantation court which included a slave jury system.

Recognizing the intelligence and leadership of Ben Montgomery, a slave, Davis made him an overseer. He also entrusted him with running a store on the plantation. Montgomery also negotiated the sale of cotton from both plantations, which was highly unusual for the time.

== American Civil War ==
In 1863, after the fall of Vicksburg, Davis took his family and took many of his slaves away from the plantation to Tuscaloosa, Alabama. Such moves were typical of major planters trying to preserve their "property" in chattel. His wife Eliza died the following year. They had no children together.

Ben Montgomery continued to run things. But some slaves broke into the Big House and appropriated clothing and furniture. When the Union Army gained control of the area, General Ulysses S. Grant decided to make Davis Bend a "negro paradise" and allowed freedmen to lease land, as well as allowing black refugees to settle in the area. In 1865, Davis Bend raised nearly 2000 bales of cotton which Montgomery arranged for sale at a profit of $160,000. The slave community at Davis Bend had internal conflicts, as well as conflict with some of the military orders during the war. Many left after emancipation.

== Postwar years ==
At the war's end, Davis returned to Vicksburg, slightly upriver from Davis Bend. Although his land had been confiscated during the war, he secured a pardon from President Andrew Johnson. He eventually regained his land from the Freedmen's Bureau, which was managing refugees. Many freedmen had already left by 1867 when Davis Bend got cut off from the mainland. The flooding Mississippi River cut a new channel across the neck of the peninsula, transforming it into the island. Davis arranged a mortgage for Montgomery, selling him the plantation on a long-term note to make a community of freedmen. The community continued as a cooperative until it failed in the 1880s, at which time Isaiah Montgomery, Benjamin's son, moved the residents to found a new black community in Mound Bayou, Mississippi.

Davis and a granddaughter (born to one of his illegitimate daughters) resided upriver in the city of Vicksburg, from 1868 to his death in 1870. They lived in a grand house known as Anchuca, now on the National Register of Historic Places. Davis became noted for his benevolence, for he paid to educate many youths of both sexes.

== See also ==
- Jefferson Davis
- List of slave owners
