= Brierfield Plantation =

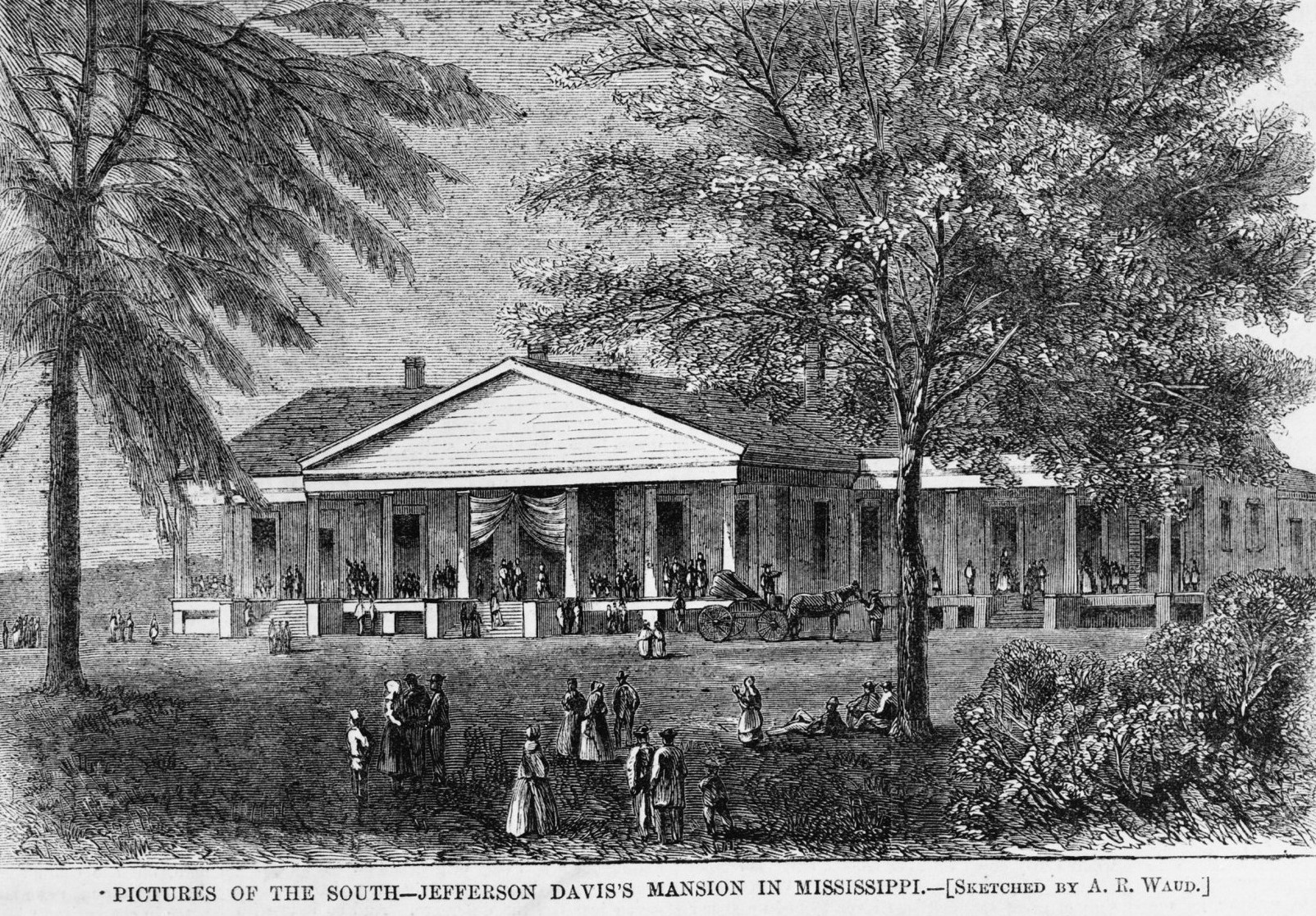
- 1866 engraving of the main house.

- Location within Mississippi
- 32.15320°N 91.12094°W
- Location: Davis Bend, Mississippi

History
- Built: 1847
- Built for: Jefferson Davis
- Demolished: 1931 (burned)

Site notes
- Architectural style: Greek Revival
- Governing body: Private

Brierfield Plantation was a plantation built in 1847 in Davis Bend, Mississippi. It was the home of Jefferson Davis, future president of the Confederate States of America, in the years preceding the American Civil War.

== History ==
Brirfield and Hurricane Plantations along the Mississippi, mapped approximately 1866

The use of the plantation, with more than 1,000 acres, was given to Jefferson Davis by his much older brother, Joseph Emory Davis (1784-1870); it had previously been a part of Joseph Davis's much larger Hurricane Plantation, which it adjoined on a bend of the Mississippi River twenty miles from Vicksburg. With his brother's financial assistance and the forced labor of enslaved people, Jefferson Davis became a successful planter on the acreage following his brief first marriage to Sarah Knox Taylor (who died of malaria a few months after their wedding); after his second marriage to Varina Banks Howell in 1845, Davis erected a large comfortable frame house on the property that was home to himself, his wife, their children, as well as Davis's widowed sister and other relatives.

Brierfield had very profitable years and years of disastrous flooding but generally provided a comfortable living to supplement Davis's modest earnings from public office. Davis left the plantation for long periods, including his term in the House of Representatives, his service in the Mexican–American War, his terms in the Senate, and his four years as Secretary of War in the Franklin Pierce administration. He regarded Brierfield as his primary residence and returned to it when not in office and after he resigned from the United States Senate following the Secession of Mississippi in 1861. His return to Brierfield was brief, as he was soon notified while tending the flower gardens of the house with his wife (as he recalled), that he had been elected president of the newly formed Confederate States of America and was summoned to Montgomery, Alabama, the Confederacy's first capital.

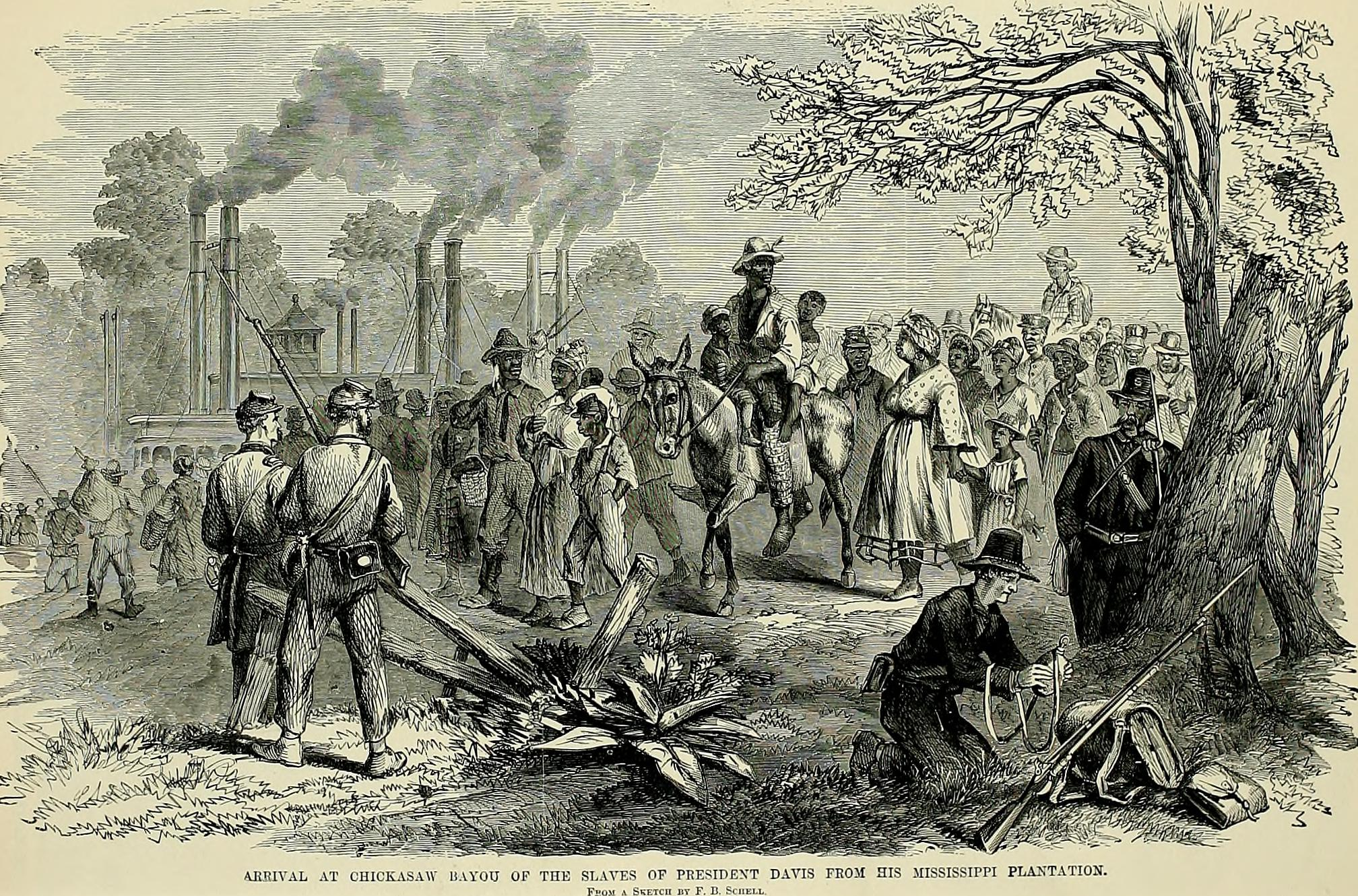
Arrival in Chickasaw Bayou in 1863 of freed slaves from Jefferson Davis's plantation.

Davis did not visit Brierfield during his tenure as Confederate president. In early 1862, a small group of enslaved people liberated themselves, took control of some of the property, and fled to the Union lines near Vicksburg. In the summer of 1863, the Davis plantation was attacked by Unionist forces. At least 137 of the more than 200 enslaved people who lived on the plantation broke free by crossing to the Union side. The rest soon followed.

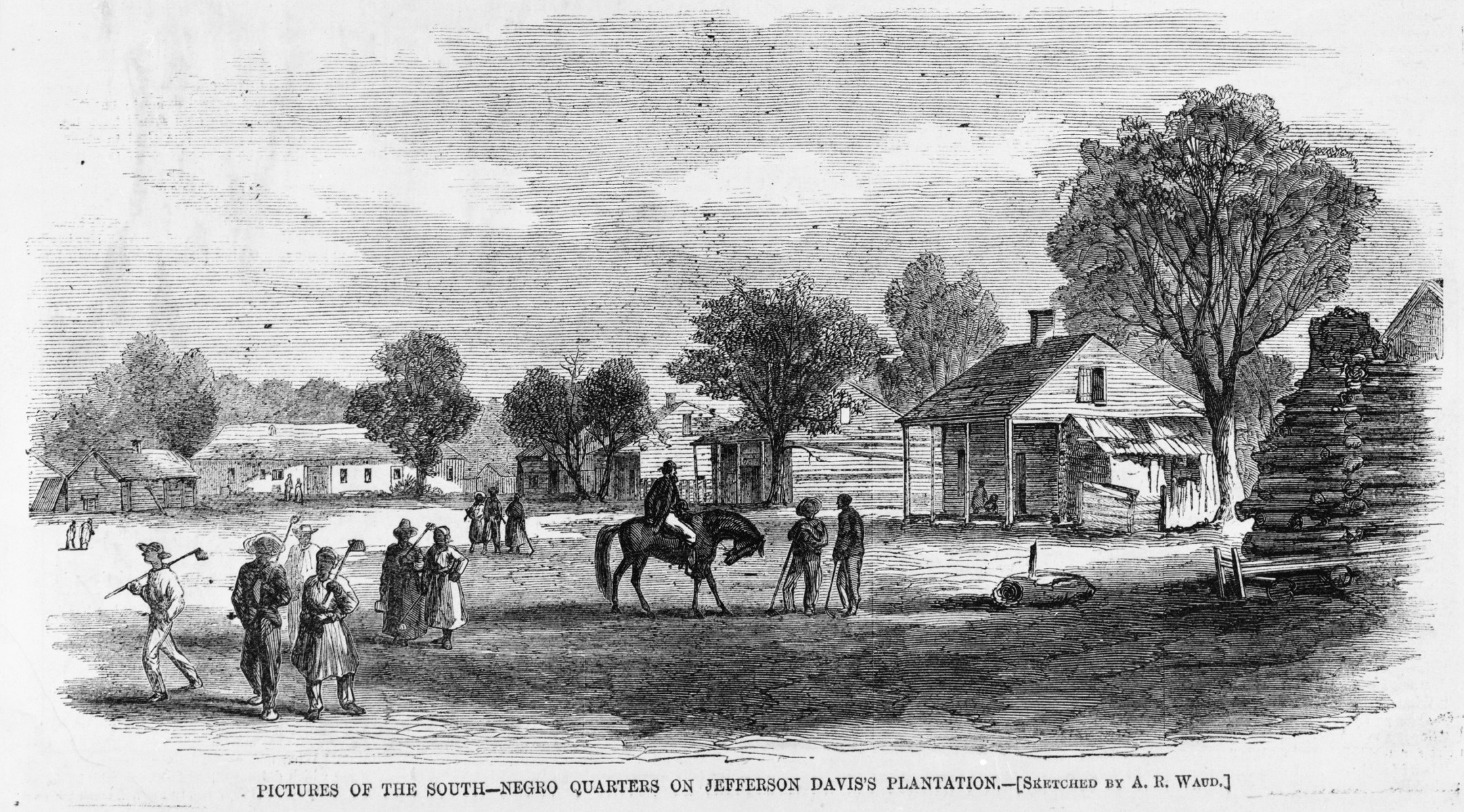
Former slave quarters at Jefferson Davis' plantation Brierfield in Mississippi, drawn by A.R. Waud, etching published 1866 in Harper's Weekly

Unlike the far larger and finer mansion of Joseph Davis at the adjoining Hurricane Plantation, which was burned to the ground, the house at Brierfield was spared the torch and used as, consecutively, field headquarters, a hospital, and a supply house for Union troops during the Mississippi campaigns. A photograph of the occupied house bearing the banner "The House Jeff Built" was widely circulated in newspapers.

Joseph Davis, who had never given Jefferson Davis title to the property, negotiated its sale after the war on a mortgage to members of the Montgomery family, former Davis family slaves, bequeathing the income from the mortgage, but not the real estate, to Jefferson in his will. The Montgomery family defaulted on the mortgage after Joseph Davis's death and the property reverted to his estate. The heirs to Joseph Davis's Hurricane plantation (his grandchildren by an acknowledged illegitimate daughter) claimed ownership of the reverted Brierfield as well, a claim disputed by Jefferson Davis, resulting in a lengthy lawsuit that was ultimately decided in Jefferson Davis's favor in 1881, giving him undisputed title to the Brierfield property for the first time, more than forty years after he first settled on the plantation.

Though his primary residence in the final decade of his life was at Beauvoir, the house and farm he had inherited near Biloxi, Jefferson Davis spent much of the remaining years of his life attempting to make Brierfield profitable again. Still, fluctuating cotton prices, floods, and the cost of free (no longer enslaved) labor now denied him the income the property had once provided. He was in residence at Brierfield in the autumn of 1889, seeing to harvest when a lingering cold developed into pneumonia, and he had to be carried onto a riverboat bound for New Orleans to receive medical attention; he died a few weeks later.

After Davis's death, his widow and surviving children left Mississippi, and none of his descendants ever resided at Brierfield. His sister-in-law, Eliza Van Benthuysen Davis, is buried at Brierfield. The house was destroyed by fire in 1931. A drainage canal converted what had been a peninsula jutting into the Mississippi River into an island.

Some of the family's belongings taken from the house by troops were returned to the Davis family over the following decades. They may now be found at various museums associated with the Davis family and the Civil War.

== Bibliography ==
- Everett, Frank Edgar Jr. (1971). Brierfield, Plantation Home of Jefferson Davis. Hattiesburg: University and College Press of Mississippi. ISBN 9780878050024.
