= Davis Bend, Mississippi =

Peninsula with utopian plantation

Coordinates: 32.1432082°N 91.1014979°W

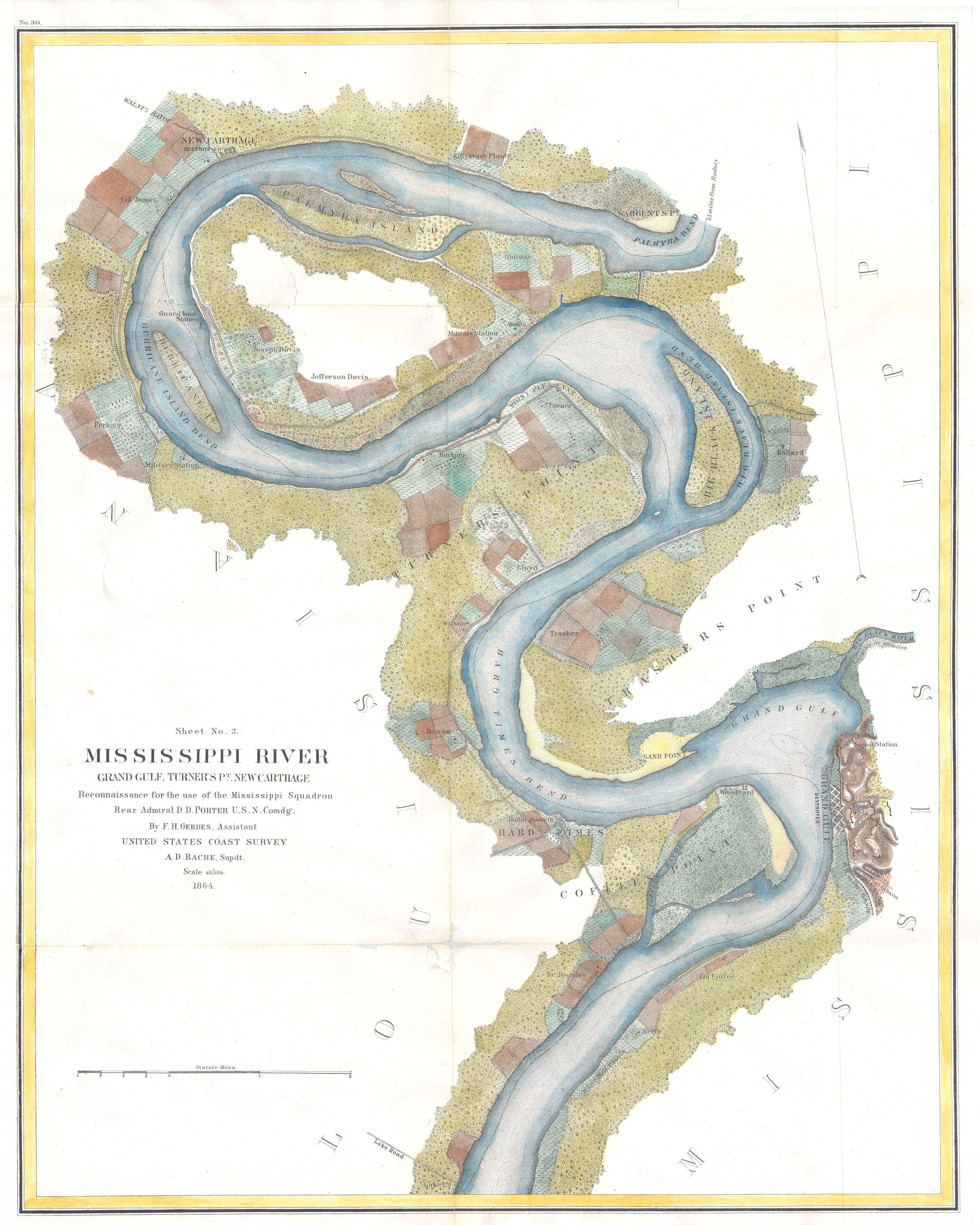
Davis Bend peninsula mapped in 1864, showing plantations of the Davis brothers and John A. Quitman

Davis Bend, Mississippi (now known as Davis Island), also known as Hurricane Island Bend, was a peninsula named after planter Joseph Emory Davis, who owned most of the property. There he established the 5,000-acre Hurricane Plantation as a model slave community. Davis Bend was about 15 miles south of Vicksburg, Mississippi, and was surrounded by the Mississippi River on three sides. Davis gave his much younger brother Jefferson Davis the adjoining Brierfield Plantation.

== Geography ==
Davis Bend was located adjacent to Palmyra Island and New Carthage, Louisiana.

== History ==
Joseph Emory Davis was influenced by the utopian socialist ideas of Robert Owen, whom he met in the 1820s during Owen's tour in the United States. When Davis established his Hurricane Plantation at Davis Bend, he worked to create a model cooperative slave community. He hoped to show that a higher functioning and profitable community could be achieved within slavery. He allowed a high degree of self-government for his 350 slaves, provided better nutrition and health and dental care, and created a communal environment. He worked closely with Benjamin T. Montgomery, a brilliant and literate African American slave, whom he allowed to establish a store on the property and who managed much of the marketing of plantation produce.

It took some effort for Davis to recover his property after the war, as it had been confiscated by the Freedman's Bureau. In 1867 the peninsula became an island after the flooding Mississippi River cut a new channel across its neck. Davis sold the property to his former slave, freedman Ben Montgomery. The community continued as a cooperative until the 1880s. At that time continually falling cotton prices, costs of transportation by water to the mainland, an economic depression, and hostility from the white community, finally caused it to fail. Isaiah Montgomery, Benjamin's son, led many of the residents to a new black community, founding Mound Bayou in northwest Mississippi.
