= Was Jefferson Davis Right? =

Was Jefferson Davis Right? is a 1998 book by James Ronald Kennedy and Walter Donald Kennedy, published by Pelican Publishing Company. The authors wrote the work to defend the secession of the Confederate States of America, which Jefferson Davis pursued as the secessonist president.

The authors had been a part of the Sons of Confederate Veterans and were among the first members of the League of the South.

Michael B. Dougan, in the Arkansas Review, characterized the book as a defense of the secession of the Southern United States, and not a defense of all of Jefferson Davis's actions, nor a comprehensive biography of Davis.

Dougan stated that the work's authors were opposed to multiple values, including civil liberties, humanism, liberalism, and separation of church and state.

== Background ==
The two authors are twin brothers and wrote other works about the Confederacy.

The book did not cite Jefferson Davis: The Man and His Hour by William C. Davis, a then-recent biography of Jefferson Davis; Brian D. McKnight of Mississippi State University stated that the sources used were not recent scholarship but instead ones that were "older, sympathetic" towards Davis.

== Contents ==
The initial part of the book is a biography on the subject. Afterwards, the authors defend Davis's positions. McKnight stated that the former part had "contradictions and irony" and that the Kennedys used the book as if they were "Jefferson Davis's defense team on the charge of treason in a trial that never took place."

The book addresses the accusations against Davis of participating in the assassination of Abraham Lincoln and on treason; Davis was never tried on either charge. The authors argued that those who accused Davis of those two items were trying to overturn the United States Constitution and compared their motivations to those of John Brown, Hezbollah, and the Unabomber. The book also characterizes the U.S. Civil War as similar in spirit to the American Revolution.

According to McKnight, the book makes Davis appear as if his positives were stronger and if the negatives were not as prominent.

== Release ==
By 1999, the book was available for purchase from major chain bookstores. According to McKnight, the book "outsold better works by superior scholars".

== Reception ==
Brian Dirck of Anderson University described the work as "a ham-handed neo-Confederate polemic." He added that the "warmed-over racial paternalism" makes the work "offensive", and that the work is similar to one written by Jefferson Davis himself. Dirck argued that the work is an example of "how simplistic analysis may be used to obfuscate and distort complex historical subjects" and that the book was "important" for that reason.

Lynda L. Crist of Rice University wrote that the position of the authors was obvious to the point where one can guess their attitudes "Without reading a word" of the book.

McKnight stated that the work "is not good historical writing." He also characterized the book as having "no scholarly value whatsoever" and that it was heavily biased towards the Confederate side. In regards to the comparison to the American Revolution, McKnight argued the comparison was not valid due to the dissimilarities between that and the Civil War. He also argued that the book would cause negative effects on history education of youths due to the book's prominence.

== See also ==
- Lost Cause of the Confederacy
- Bibliography of Jefferson Davis
