= USS Sims =

Three ships in the United States Navy have been named USS Sims for William Sowden Sims. Additionally, one other ship was named Admiral W. S. Sims for the same man.

- The destroyer USS Sims (DD-409), served in World War II, sunk by the Japanese, 1942
- The destroyer escort USS Sims (DE-154), commissioned 1943, decommissioned 1946.
- The Knox-class frigate USS W. S. Sims (DE-1059) (later FF-1059), commissioned 1970, decommissioned 1991.
- The transport vessel USS Admiral W. S. Sims (AP-127)
