= Jefferson Davis and His Cabinet =

Jefferson Davis and His Cabinet is a 1944 non-fiction book by Rembert Wallace Patrick, published by Louisiana State University Press in 1944. It describes the Cabinet of the Confederate States of America.

The book covers the setup of the Confederate cabinet as well as the people in it, personal conflicts, and changes in the cabinet. It explains how President of the Confederacy Jefferson Davis and the cabinet avoided being detained by Union forces.

== Background ==
The book is based on newspaper articles from the Southern states, as well as manuscripts, Statements in hearings of Congress, documents written by secretaries, personal documents, other documents, and secondary sources. No formal document of discussions of the Confederate cabinet were recorded, so such sourcing was not available. Reviewer Charles S. Snydor stated that in general less information existed about the Confederate Cabinet compared to the Union Cabinet.

== Content ==
There are about 18 cabinet members profiled in the book. The Florida Historical Quarterly review stated that about 12 of them were unknown to the American public at the time of the book's publication.

The book argued that Jefferson Davis had a performance in his office that would be equivalent to any other person in his position. Francis B. Simkins, of the State Teachers College of Farmville, Virginia (now Longwood University), argued that the belief expressed in this book differed from that of Burton J. Hendrick, who argued that the Confederate cabinet had performed poorly.

== Reception ==
Reviewer S. C. E. Powers stated that the book is "careful and unbiased".

Reviewer Edward L. Ryan called the book "splendid and readable".

Simkins argued that the book strictly follows the history instead of being "inspirational" and that the author avoided lionizing the subject. He also stated that the book successfully proved that "Davis and his advisers were generally men of character, industry, and intelligence".

Snydor stated that the way the cabinet operated under war was "the main value of the book".

Harrison A. Trexler of Southern Methodist University stated that the book "is an important contribution" in its field, and that it avoids "superficial reasoning" and other "weaknesses of most narratives of the Confederate government". Trexler argued that the book shows "tenderness" towards Jefferson Davis.

== See also ==
- Bibliography of Jefferson Davis
- Statesmen of the Lost Cause, Hendrick's book
