= Bibliography of Jefferson Davis =

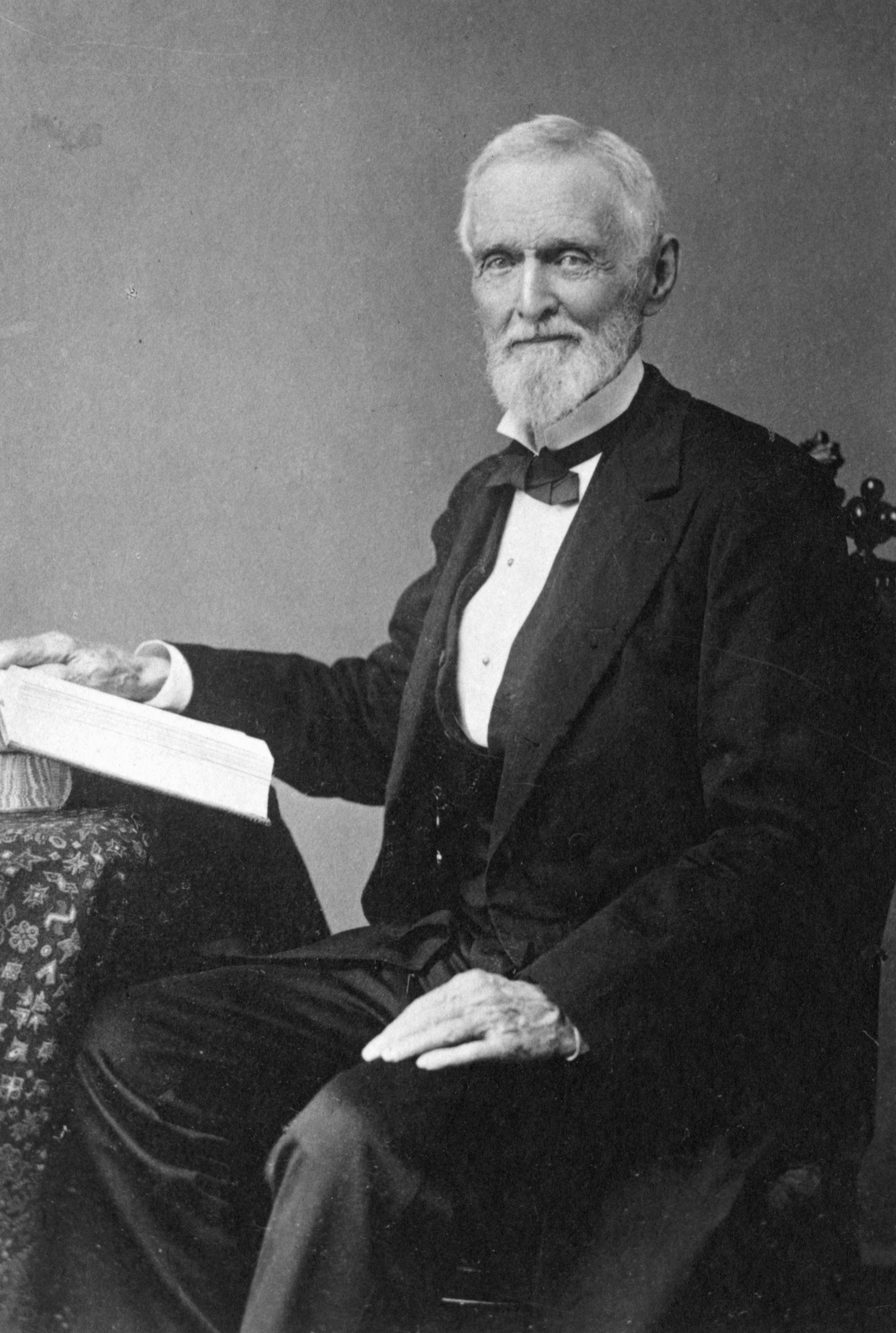
Photograph of Jefferson Davis by W. W. Washburn (1888)

The following is a list of scholarly resources related to Jefferson Davis.

Due to the large number of biographies of Davis published by 1992, Emory M. Thomas of the University of Georgia made a parody bumper sticker stating "Honk if you're not writing a biography of Jefferson Davis."

== Biographies ==
- Alfriend, Frank H. (1868). The Life of Jefferson Davis. Caxton Publishing House; Philadelphia.
- Allen, Felicity (1999). Jefferson Davis: Unconquerable Heart. The University of Missouri Press. ISBN 9780826212191. - Wikipedia article on the book: Jefferson Davis: Unconquerable Heart
- Bancroft, A. C. (1889). The Life and Death of Jefferson Davis, Ex-President of the Southern Confederacy: Together with Comments of the Press, Funeral Sermons, etc., etc. Oglivie. OCLC 1048340011.
- Cooper, William J. (2000). Jefferson Davis, American. Knopf. ISBN 978-0-3077-7264-0. OCLC 1035904007.
- Cutting, Elisabeth (1930). Jefferson Davis, Political Soldier. Dodd, Mead and Company. OCLC 1035928281.
- Davis, William C. (1991). Jefferson Davis: The Man and his Hour. Harpercollins. ISBN 0060167068. OCLC 1150103061. - Wikipedia article on the book: Jefferson Davis: The Man and His Hour
- Davis, Varina (1890). Jefferson Davis, ex-president of the Confederate States of America, a memoir, Vol I. New York : Belford Co. OCLC 1029853778.
- Davis, Varina (1890). Jefferson Davis, ex-president of the Confederate States of America, a memoir, Vol II. New York : Belford Co. OCLC 1029853778.
- Dodd, William E. (1907). Jefferson Davis. George W. Jacobs and Company. ISBN 9780722290484.
- Eaton, Clement (1977). Jefferson Davis. Free Press. ISBN 0029087007. OCLC 1035928281.
- Eckenrode, Hamilton J. (1923). Jefferson Davis, President of the South. MacMillan. OCLC 1047517195.
- Fleming, Walter L. (1917). The Early Life of Jefferson Davis. Louisiana State University Press. OCLC 1043017637.
- McElroy, Robert N. (1995) [1937]. Jefferson Davis: The Real and The Unreal. Smithmark. ISBN 0831710071. OCLC 1150111549.
- Pollard, Edward A. (1869). Life of Jefferson Davis with a Secret History of the southern Confederacy, Gathered "Behind the Scenes in Richmond.". National Publishing. OCLC 1048313016.
- Strode, Hudson (1955). Jefferson Davis, Volume I: American Patriot. Harcourt, Brace & Company. OCLC 1035912264.
- Strode, Hudson (1959). Jefferson Davis, Volume II: Confederate President. Harcourt, Brace & Company. OCLC 1150115051.
- Strode, Hudson (1964). Jefferson Davis, Volume III: Tragic Hero. Harcourt, Brace & Company. OCLC 1150063449.
- Tate, Allen (1929). Jefferson Davis: His Rise and Fall, a Biographical Narrative. Minton, Balch & Company. OCLC 1345571855.
- Winston, Robert W (1930). High Stakes and Hair Trigger: The Life of Jefferson Davis. Henry Holt & Company.

== Books (specialized studies) ==
- Ballard, Michael B. (1986). A Long Shadow: Jefferson Davis and the Final Days of the Confederacy. University Press of Mississippi. ISBN 9780820319414. OCLC 1036689136. - Wikipedia article on the book: A Long Shadow
- Beringer, Richard E.; Hattaway, Herman; Jones, Archer; Still, William N. Jr. (1986). Why the South Lost the Civil War. University of Georgia Press.
- Cashin, Joan E. (2006). First Lady of the Confederacy: Varina Davis's Civil War. Belknap Press of Harvard University Press. ISBN 9780674022942. OCLC 0674022947. - Wikipedia article on the book: First Lady of the Confederacy: Varina Davis's Civil War
- Collins, Donald E. (2005). The Death and Resurrection of Jefferson Davis. Rowman & Littlefield Publishers. ISBN 9780742543041.
- Cooper, William J. (2008). Jefferson Davis and the Civil War Era. Louisiana State University Press. ISBN 9780807133712. OCLC 1302084578.
- Dugard, Martin (2009). The Training Ground: Grant, Lee, Sherman, and Davis in the Mexican War, 1846–1848. University of Nebraska Press. ISBN 9780803228122. OCLC 1302546114.
- Eckert, Edward K. (1987). "Fiction Distorting Fact": Prison life, annotated by Jefferson Davis. Mercer University Press. ISBN 0865542015. OCLC 1200471494.
- Escott, Paul (1978). After Secession: Jefferson Davis and the Failure of Confederate Nationalism. Louisiana State University Press. ISBN 9780807118078.
- Hattaway, Herman; Beringer, Richard E. (2002). Jefferson Davis, Confederate President. University Press of Kansas. ISBN 9780700611706.'
- Icenhauer-Ramirez, Robert (2019). Treason on Trial: The United States v. Jefferson Davis. Louisiana State University Press. ISBN 9780807170809. OCLC 1056201876..
- McPherson, James M. (2014). Embattled Rebel: Jefferson Davis as Commander in Chief. Penguin Press. ISBN 9781594204975. OCLC 1204326178.
- Nicoletti, Cynthia (2017). Secession on Trial: The Treason Prosecution of Jefferson Davis. Cambridge University Press. ISBN 9781108415521. Review
- Patrick, Rembert W. (1944). Jefferson Davis and His Cabinet. Louisiana State University Press.
- Swanson, James L. (2010). Bloody Crimes: The Chase for Jefferson Davis and the Death Pageant for Lincoln's Corpse. HarperCollins. ISBN 9780061233791.
- Warren, Robert Penn (1980). Jefferson Davis Gets His Citizenship Back. Lexington: The University Press of Kentucky. ISBN 978-0813114453.
- White, Jonathan W. "The Trial of Jefferson Davis and the Americanization of Treason Law". Marino, Paul D. and O'Neill Johnathan, eds. (2013). Constitutionalism in the Approach and Aftermath of the Civil War. New York: Fordham University Press, pp. 113-132.
- Winders, Richard B. (2016). Panting For Glory: The Mississippi Rifles in the Mexican War. Texas A & M University. ISBN 9781623494162. OCLC 933438558.
- Woodworth, Steven E. (1990). Jefferson Davis and His Generals: The Failure of Confederate Command in the West. Lawrence: University Press of Kansas. ISBN 9780700604616.

== Journal articles ==
- Bleser, Carol K. (1999). "The Marriage of Varina Howell and Jefferson Davis:"I gave the best and all my life to a girdled tree."". The Journal of Southern History. 65 (1): 3–40. doi:10.2307/2587730. JSTOR 2587730.
- Fleming, Walter L. (1920). "Some documents related to Jefferson Davis at West Point". The Mississippi Valley Historical Review. 7 (2): 146–152. doi:10.2307/1902656. JSTOR 1902656.
- Muldowny, John (1969). "Jefferson Davis: The postwar years". The Mississippi Quarterly. 23 (1): 17–35. JSTOR 26473833.
- Scanlan, P. L. (1940). "The military record of Jefferson Davis in Wisconsin". The Wisconsin Magazine of History. 24 (2): 174–182. JSTOR 4631371.
- Waite, Kevin (2016). "Jefferson Davis and proslavery visions of empire in the Far West" (PDF). Journal of the Civil War Era. 8 (4): 536–565. doi:10.1353/cwe.2016.0072. JSTOR 26070455. S2CID 164302059.
- Wiley, Bell I. (January 1967). "Jefferson Davis: An Appraisal". Civil War Times Illustrated. 6 (1): 4–17.
- Williams, Kenneth H.; Cooper, William J. Jr.; Roland, Charles P. (2003). Williams, Kenneth H. (ed.). "Slavery, the Civil War, and Jefferson Davis: An Interview with William J. Cooper Jr. and Charles P. Roland". The Register of the Kentucky Historical Society. 101 (4): 400–456. JSTOR 23387081.

== Miscelleaneous ==
- Neely, Mark E. Jr. (1993). Confederate Bastille: Jefferson Davis and Civil Liberties (lecture). Marquette University Press. pp. 1–23. ISBN 9780874623253..
