= Jefferson Davis: Unconquerable Heart =

Non-fiction book by Felicity Allen (1999)

Jefferson Davis: Unconquerable Heart is a 1999 non-fiction book by Felicity Allen, published by the University of Missouri Press, about Jefferson Davis.

The author argued that many existing works were overly critical and did not show positive aspects of Davis. Judith Anne Fenner Gentry of the University of Louisiana at Lafayette characterized the work's goal as showing all aspects of Jefferson Davis rather than focusing on the individual's "faults". Brian D. McKnight of Mississippi State University described the work as being "partisan" to the Confederate States of America.

Publishers Weekly stated that the book mainly focused on Davis's personal character in his family life and not outside, wider political developments. The publication stated that the book illustrates "emphasis on Davis the family man and Davis the martyred symbol of a vanquished but proud and unrepentant South."

== Background ==
Allen was not affiliated with an academic institution, but was instead an independent scholar. She originated from Auburn, Alabama. She dedicated the book to her grandmother, whom she described as "a Confederate to the last."

The sourcing included Varina Davis's memoirs, which Chris Graham of the North Carolina Museum of History described as "adoring". Sourcing also included Jefferson Davis Papers, which had Lynda Crist and Mary Dix as editors, as well as a collection of papers from Davis held by Dunbar Rowland. Additionally she used books, manuscripts, memoirs, secondary sources, and speeches. The book did not cite Robert E. Lee: A Biography by Emory M. Thomas nor did it cite Davis and Lee at War by Steven E. Woodworth.

She stated that she wrote the book so the public would understand aspects of Davis that were not widely known.

== Content ==
The book covers the involvement of Davis's father in the American Revolution at the start, the goes into Davis's lifespan, including his statements and attitudes in the public sphere as well as the private one.

Gentry stated that the book's picture of Varina Davis was that Davis was compelled to control her as she was "quarrelsome, jealous", and Allen had described her as "mercurial". Reviewer Mary Seaton Dix, who co-edited The Papers of Jefferson Davis, stated that the book's point of view is that the husband and wife were "strong-willed individuals devoted to each other but not always compatible."

McKnight characterizes the book's depiction of Davis in that he had no negative aspects. Citing Davis's anger towards government officials and Varina, reviewer Walter Sullivan stated that "Allen's devotion to veracity prevents her from making of Davis the saintly figure that she would prefer him to be." Sullivan stated that the author's point of view of the man "is one of admiration and deep affection that will not be shared by those who judge all history by the standards of the present."

J. Thomas Murphy of Bemidji State University state that in general the book has a pro-CSA point of view, with a negative attitude towards anti-slavery campaigners and people from the Northern United States, as well as a "paternalistic" point of view towards slavery. The book avoids calling slaves by that name as uses other language to describe them, which McKnight characterizes as trying to "soften" the situation.

== Reception ==
Dix stated that the book is "a good biography [...] but it is partisan." Dix added that "Allen may be too protective of Davis".

Gentry stated that the work "succeeds" in showing a positive picture of Jefferson Davis. Gentry added that the work "is an excellent portrayal of the ideals of" the people in Davis's social class and occupation.

Graham stated that the work was "hagiographical", and that "Lost Cause sentimentality" serves as the "tone" of the work. He also criticized the "uncritical" point of view towards Davis.

Paul B. Hatley of Rogers State University described the book as "fresh and welcome", and "impressive".

Brad Hooper of Booklist argued that the work is "neither an apologia nor a whitewash".

McKnight stated that scholars should rely on other books and concluded, "This book is flawed." He described the author's analysis of Varina as "adequate".

Murphy argued that the Davis portrayed in the book "appears as a one-dimensional figure", and he felt that the work served as "a helpful look into" the environment that Davis lived in. Murphy criticized the pro-CSA point of view.

Michael Thomas Smith of Pennsylvania State University described the book as "overwhelmingly favorable" towards Davis, and stated that it was "richly documented and thoroughly researched". Smith felt that the work helped give balance to the Davis scholarship, though he felt that other works would be the premier scholarship on Davis.

Sullivan concluded that the book is "by far the best biography of Davis", stating that it is "Brilliantly written, exhaustively researched".

Publishers Weekly argued that in regards to showing Davis as having nobility and being "the personification of Southern "glory"", the author "largely succeeds". The publication argued that the work did not explain "how a supposedly great man could devote his public life to defending slavery."

Kirkus Reviews described the work as a "hagiography" and did not recommend it for people who did not have a pro-Confederate point of view.

== See also ==
- Bibliography of Jefferson Davis
