= USS Sims (DE-154) =

Buckley-class destroyer escort

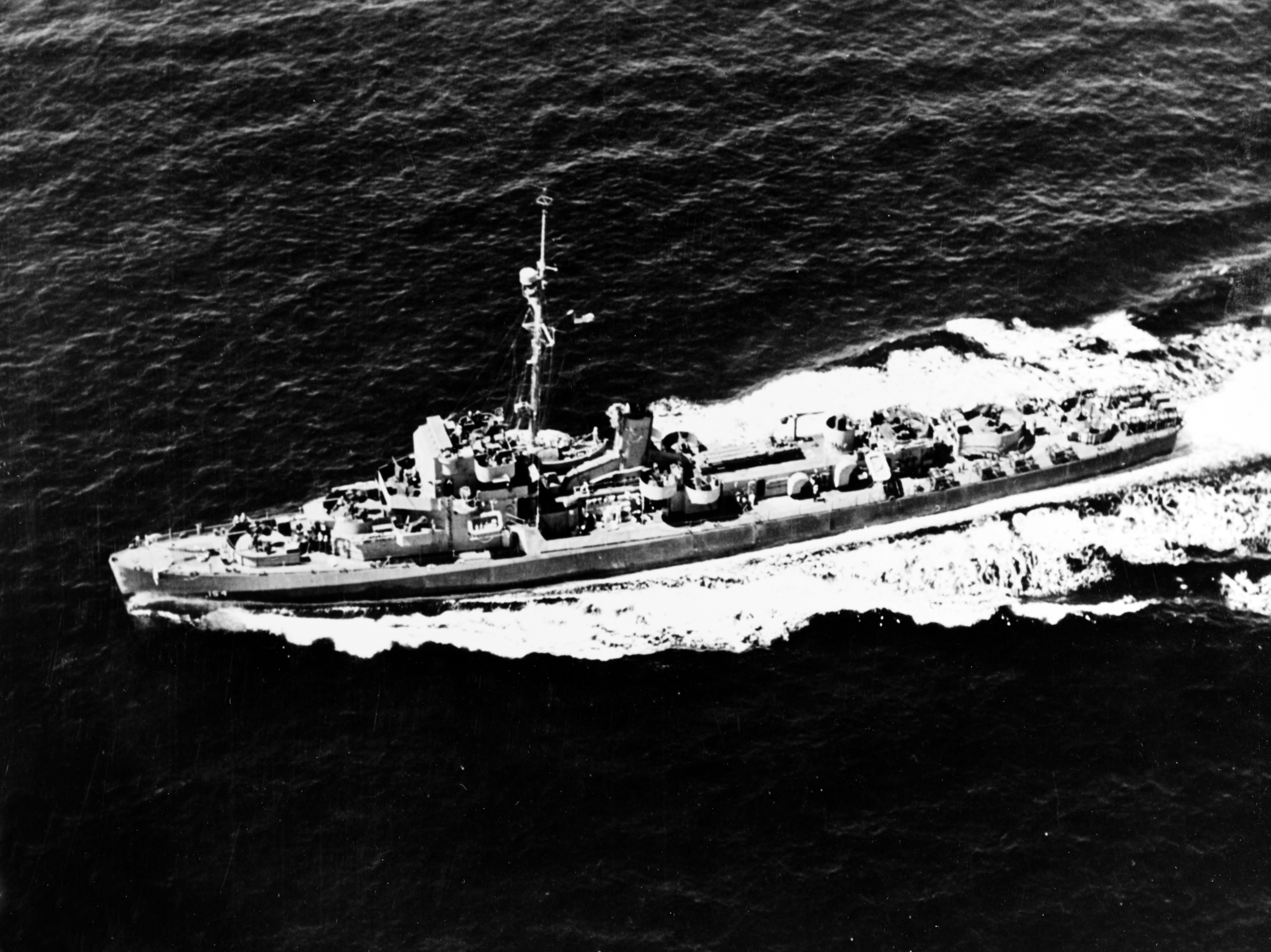
- Sims on 26 August 1944

History

United States
- Name: USS Sims
- Namesake: William Sims
- Ordered: 1942
- Builder: Norfolk Navy Yard, Portsmouth, Virginia
- Laid down: 7 September 1942
- Launched: 6 February 1943
- Commissioned: 24 April 1943
- Decommissioned: 24 April 1946
- Reclassified: APD-50, 7 September 1944
- Stricken: 1 June 1960
- Honors and awards: 1 battle star (World War II)
- Fate: Sold for scrap, 14 April 1961

General characteristics
- Class & type: Buckley-class destroyer escort
- Displacement: 1,400 long tons (1,422 t) standard; 1,740 long tons (1,768 t) full load
- Length: 306 ft (93 m)
- Beam: 37 ft (11 m)
- Draft: 9 ft 6 in (2.90 m) standard; 11 ft 3 in (3.43 m) full load
- Propulsion: 2 × boilers; General Electric turbo-electric drive; 12,000 shp (8.9 MW); 2 × solid manganese-bronze 3,600 lb (1,600 kg) 3-bladed propellers, 8 ft 6 in (2.59 m) diameter, 7 ft 7 in (2.31 m) pitch; 2 × rudders; 359 tons fuel oil
- Speed: 23 knots (43 km/h; 26 mph)
- Range: 3,700 nmi (6,900 km) at 15 kn (28 km/h; 17 mph); 6,000 nmi (11,000 km) at 12 kn (22 km/h; 14 mph)
- Complement: 15 officers, 198 men
- Armament: 3 × 3"/50 caliber guns; 1 × quad 1.1"/75 caliber gun; 8 × single 20 mm guns; 1 × triple 21-inch (533 mm) torpedo tubes; 1 × Hedgehog anti-submarine mortar; 8 × K-gun depth charge projectors; 2 × depth charge tracks

USS Sims (DE-154/APD-50) was a Buckley-class destroyer escort in service with the United States Navy from 1943 to 1946. She was scrapped in 1961.

== History ==
USS Sims was named in honor of Admiral William Sowden Sims (1858–1936), who pushed for modernization of the navy. She is the second ship in the United States Navy to be named USS Sims. Sims was laid down on 7 September 1942 at the Norfolk Navy Yard, Portsmouth, Virginia; launched on 6 February 1943, sponsored by Mrs. Anne H. Sims, and commissioned on 24 April 1943.

=== Battle of the Atlantic ===
After fitting out, Sims completed her shakedown off Bermuda. She was then assigned to Task Group (TG) 21.6 escorting tankers from Curaçao to Derry, Northern Ireland. After two such runs, the western terminus was changed to New York, and the escort made eight more trips escorting tankers from New York to Derry. In the 20 crossings, only one tanker was sunk by a U-boat.

On 23 September 1944, Sims entered the Boston Navy Yard for conversion into a Charles Lawrence-class high speed transport. The work completed, Sims (now designated APD-50) departed Boston on 6 December 1944 for Norfolk, Virginia.

=== Pacific War ===
Sims served as a training ship there until 24 January 1945 when she put to sea. After transiting the Panama Canal, and a brief shakedown period at San Diego, the transport arrived at Pearl Harbor on 20 February.

Sims sailed for the Philippine Islands on 5 March and arrived there on the 21st. A week later, the transport stood out of Leyte Gulf as part of Task Unit 51.13.16, bound for the invasion of Okinawa. Except for two fast convoy trips to Ulithi, she remained off Okinawa from 1 April to 27 May. During this period, the ship was part of the anti-aircraft and anti-submarine screen around the island. She shot down an attacking Japanese bomber on 16 April. On 3 and 4 May and again on 13 and 14 May, Sims assisted in the search for survivors of picket destroyers hit by kamikaze aircraft.

On the evening of 18 May, two kamikaze planes made a combined attack. Both planes, hit by anti-aircraft fire, crashed into the water on her port side with a violent explosion that lifted and shook the entire ship. The shock caused serious oil leaks and considerable damage to machinery and equipment. The crew repaired the damage, and Sims continued patrolling. On the 24th, she was again attacked by a kamikaze. The plane, even though hit by anti-aircraft fire, crashed close aboard to starboard. Sims was sprayed with shrapnel which wounded 11 of her crew. Later that day, a fire and rescue party was sent on board Barry (DD-248) which had been hit by a kamikaze. Fires prevented flooding her magazine, and she had been abandoned. Sims' party helped bring the fires under control, and Barry was taken under tow by a tug. Sims departed Okinawa on 27 May with a convoy which she escorted to Saipan before continuing on to Leyte for damage repairs.

The transport was back on patrol off Okinawa on 26 June. On 14 August, Sims rendezvoused at sea with the Tokyo Bay Occupation Force south of Japan. The ship landed a group of British Marines and Royal Navy personnel at the Yokosuka Naval Base on 30 August. The following day, she landed a company of United States Marines at the Tateyama Naval Air Station and stood by and took them off again when they were relieved by 8th U.S. Army units on 3 September. Sims then made a voyage to Iwo Jima, after which she operated in the Japanese home waters until 28 November. On that date, she stood out of Tokyo Bay en route to the eastern seaboard of the United States. The transport disembarked 208 passengers at San Diego, California, on 17 December 1945, and continued to New York for pre-inactivation overhaul.

=== Decommissioning and fate ===
Sims was decommissioned at Green Cove Springs, Florida, on 24 April 1946 and placed in the Atlantic Reserve Fleet. She remained inactive until struck from the Navy List on 1 June 1960. Her hulk was sold to the North American Smelting Company, Wilmington, Delaware, on 14 April 1961 and scrapped.

== Awards and honors ==
Sims received one battle star for World War II services.
