= A Long Shadow =

A Long Shadow: Jefferson Davis and the Last Days of the Confederacy is a 1986 non-fiction book by Michael B. Ballard, published by the University Press of Mississippi.

The book describes the collapse of the Confederate States of America during the United States Civil War and the aftermath of the said collapse, among it the Assassination of Abraham Lincoln.

Patrick G. Gerster of Lakewood Community College stated that the book portrays Davis in a "human" in an "elusive middle ground" manner that highlights his strengths, weaknesses, and the "complex character" as opposed to in an "extreme" manner; according to Gerster, the primary sourcing supports Ballard's portrayal.

== Contents ==
The Virginia Quarterly Review stated that the book shows that Jefferson Davis, the CSA president, chose to believe that he could still win the war even though everyone else in his circle gave up on the idea, and that the book's focus is on him. The work also stated that reception towards Jefferson Davis improved in the Southern United States by the termination of the war despite earlier misgivings. The book, in the words of Gerster, showed how Jefferson Davis became "a symbol of his suffering Southland", and that the evolution of his reception is "Perhaps the most important dimension of" the work.

== Reception ==
Granville D. Davis of Rhodes College wrote that the work analyzes the matter in a "convincing" manner, and that the text has strong "clarity"; Granville Davis also praised the "thoroughness of [the author's] research".

According to Gerster, the work highlights "important historical nuances" about the topic.

The Virginia Quarterly Review praised how the work "aims higher than an exciting narrative of chase and capture."

== See also ==
- Bibliography of Jefferson Davis
