= First Lady of the Confederacy: Varina Davis's Civil War =

First Lady of the Confederacy: Varina Davis's Civil War is a 2006 book by Joan E. Cashin, published by Harvard University Press. Its subject is Varina Davis.

It was the first biography of Davis written for an academic purpose, and the first written by a historian who adopted the job as a career. Additionally, LeeAnn Whites of the University of Missouri, Columbia, described it as "the first professional biography" of the subject.

Frances Clarke of the University of Sydney stated that the work not only discusses Davis but also "the paradoxes of Southern history and the trajectory of Confederate memory".

== Background ==
Cashin worked for Ohio State University as a professor with the rank associate.

Virginia J. Laas of Missouri Southern State University stated that prior to the publication of this book, scholars had to use First Lady of the South: The Life of Mrs. Jefferson Davis, a 1958 book that she called "superficial".

== Content ==
The initial portion of the book discusses how, towards the end of her life, Varina attempted to write an autobiography.

The book is a comprehensive biography of all stages of Varina's life. Cashin argued that Varina's beliefs were determined by her views on social class, culture, gender, and racial beliefs, which the author groups into four themes.

The book's discussion of Varina's initial years includes those of the culture, customs, and history of the antebellum Southern United States.

Stephanie McCurry of University of Pennsylvania wrote that the book covers relatively little of the American Civil War itself.

The later parts of the book touch upon the retrospective point of view of history among White Southerners. Clarke stated that "narrow-minded shrillness (in fact, downright craziness)" of Neo-Confederates is evident in these portions.

In the portions discussing Varina's life before she publicly repudiated the South, Laas states, especially in regards to African-American issues and slavery, that the author "becomes impatient with her subject, wanting Varina to be a real rebel". The final portion of the book states that repudiation, when Varina stated that the Union was the correct side to achieve victory in the civil war.

Laas concludes that the book's picture of Jefferson Davis, Varina's husband, was "a devastating portrait of a self-absorbed and egotistical man." McCurry agreed, stating that Jefferson Davis was "so utterly self-regarding, so painfully disloyal to his own family." McCurry added that the information "does more to destroy the man's reputation than anything his political critics could possibly have said of him."

== Reception ==
Clarke stated that the work is "enthralling", and that even non-academic readers may find interest in the work due to the historical details and because it is "unusually well-paced". Citing how the author gives context throughout the book to each detail, Clarke described the author as "an exemplary historian".

Janet L. Coryell of Western Michigan University stated that the text is "lively" and the "research is impeccable".

Brad Hooper of Booklist wrote that the author had "well-researched" the work, and that she has a "Sympathetic but not uncritical" tone.

Laas stated that the work is a "fine biography", and that it is "wonderfully crafted and insightful". She argued that the author was even-handed in presenting Jefferson Davis so a reader would understand why Varina did not leave him. Laas also argued, in regards to Varina Davis's lack of commitment to the Confederate cause, that the author "does an outstanding job of exploring the ramifications of Varina's" beliefs.

Chandra Miller Manning of Georgetown University stated that the book does not say as much about the years Varina was First Lady of the Confederacy, which was her reason for notability but also the period where she perceived herself most as being stifled. Manning overall praised the efforts of the author, stating "the pleasure of getting to know [the subject of the book] is worthwhile in its own right." She argued that, due to the limitations of the subject, "even the most delightful biography of Davis mainly confirms rather than adds to what we already know" about various subjects.

McCurry praised the author's work in making the book. She favored the focus on Varina's life instead of on the civil war. McCurry argued that the enjoyment of reading the book differed by section, which reflected how Varina felt during her marriage; she argued that while the initial part is "vibrant and engaging", the married life part was "dull and slogging" "as if marriage[...]dragged down author with subject." Then, in the last portion of the book, after Jefferson Davis is dead, McCurry states that "Joan Cashin and Varina Howell Davis have a much better time".

Micki McElya of the University of Connecticut stated that the book is "exhaustively researched and illuminating".

Whites praised the book as being "meticulously researched, compellingly written, and thoughtfully presented".

Publishers Weekly gave the book a starred review and stated that it is "a terrifically winning" work, and that the author is "a strong, clear writer".

== See also ==
- Bibliography of Jefferson Davis
