= The Victory at Sea =

1920 military history book by Admiral William Sims

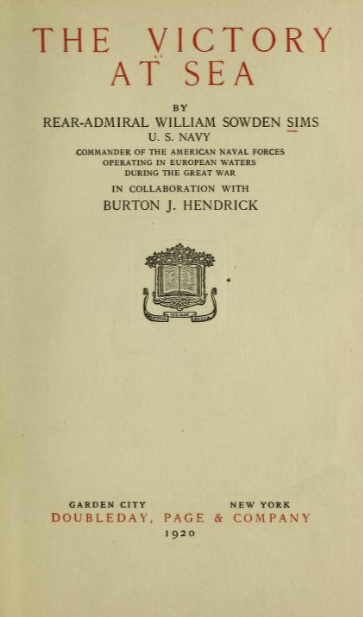
- Title page for The Victory at Sea (1920)
- Author: William Sims and Burton J. Hendrick
- Language: English
- Genre: Non-fiction
- Publication date: 1920
- Publication place: United States
- Pages: 319

The Victory at Sea is a 1920 military history book by Admiral William Sims in collaboration with Burton J. Hendrick. It concern's Sims' career in the Atlantic theater of World War I. It won the 1921 Pulitzer Prize for History.
