= Finn McCool's Football Club =

2009 book by Stephen Rea

Finn McCool's Football Club: The Birth, Death and Resurrection of a Pub Soccer Team in the City of the Dead
- Author: Stephen Rea
- Genre: Memoir
- Publisher: Pelican Publishing Company
- Publication date: February 2009

Finn McCool's Football Club is a 2009 memoir by Belfast author Stephen Rea. It was published by Pelican Publishing Company.

== Synopsis ==
The book details Rea and his American wife's emigration from Northern Ireland to New Orleans. While living there, Rea became a regular at the Irish pub Finn McCool's, where he helped form a pub soccer team. The book focuses on the impact of Hurricane Katrina on the team, pub and community.

== Reception ==
The book has received mostly positive reviews.
