= Pelican Publishing =

American book publisher

- Pelican Publishing logo
- Parent company: Arcadia Publishing
- Founded: 1926
- Founder: John McClure
- Country of origin: United States
- Headquarters location: Elmwood, Louisiana
- Distribution: United States and worldwide
- Key people: Stuart Omer Landry, Hodding Carter, Milburn Calhoun
- Publication types: books
- Nonfiction topics: history, travel guides, art, architecture, children's books, textbooks, Louisiana
- Official website: pelicanpub.com, www.arcadiapublishing.com/imprints/pelican-publishing

Pelican Publishing Company is a book publisher based in Elmwood, Louisiana, with a New Orleans postal address. It was acquired in 2019 by Arcadia Publishing, a leading publisher of local and regional content in the United States. Scott Campbell has served as Publisher since 2020. Pelican publishes approximately 60 titles per year and maintains a backlist of over 2,500 books. Most of its titles relate to Louisiana and Southern culture, cuisine, art, travel guides, history, children's books, and textbooks.

== History ==
Founded in 1926 by John McClure, Pelican's early history was tied to William Faulkner. Its roots were in the Pelican Bookshop on Royal Street, a hangout for New Orleans' literary circle of the time, which included Faulkner, Sherwood Anderson, Caroline Durieux, Grace King, and Lyle Saxon.

Its first release was Sherwood Anderson and Other Famous Creoles: A Gallery of Contemporary New Orleans, a book of illustrations by William Spratling with captions and a foreword by Faulkner. Spratling and Faulkner were roommates in a building just off Jackson Square. The book was a play on the Mexican cartoonist Miguel Covarrubias' The Prince of Wales and Other Famous Americans, published the previous year; just as the Prince of Wales was not an American, Sherwood Anderson was not a Creole.

=== Stuart Omer Landry period ===
In early 1927, Pelican was acquired by Stuart Omer Landry, who owned the publisher until his death in 1966. Landry, who was born on his father's Alma plantation near Thibodaux, worked in advertising and was a founding board member of the Metairie Park Country Day School. Landry was anti-New Deal and a racial conservative, and under him, Pelican published many books advocating white supremacist and segregationist positions, including his own The Cult of Equality: A Study of the Race Problem (1945), The Battle of Liberty Place: The Overthrow of Carpet-bag Rule in New Orleans, September 14, 1874 (1955) (a defense of the White League and the Ku Klux Klan), and Rebuilding the Tower of Babel: A Study of Christianity and Segregation (1957).

The African-American newspaper the California Eagle called Landry "an old-line Southerner of the traditional Keep-the-Negro-in-Place School." Landry also published the first edition of the Louisiana Almanac in 1949. Historian Lawrence N. Powell described Landry's Battle of Liberty Place as "propaganda, using history to defend segregation and a racial status quo."

=== Sales to Hodding Carter and to the Calhouns ===
After Landry's death, Pelican was bought in 1967 by Hodding Carter, the Pulitzer Prize-winning progressive journalist. He renamed the publisher to Pelican Publishing House, but his ownership lasted only three years. In 1970, Carter sold Pelican to brothers Milburn and James L. Calhoun, natives of West Monroe in north Louisiana. Milburn, who became Pelican's publisher and president, was a physician in New Orleans; James, who would be Pelican's senior editor, did public relations work for Louisiana State University. The brothers already owned a similar publisher, Bayou Books of New Orleans. The brothers were, like Landry, conservative; among the first books issued under their ownership was The Real Spiro Agnew: Commonsense Quotations of a Household Word, edited by James Calhoun.

By 1998, the headquarters was in suburban Gretna, where a 1998 fire at the publisher's offices and warehouse did an estimated $2 million in damage.

=== The Calhoun Era ===
Along with works of local history and other mainstream nonfiction, the Calhouns also turned Pelican into what has been called "the central publishing house of the Neo-Confederate movement," including books that helped "found the modern neo-Confederate movement." Among the titles it published were Was Jefferson Davis Right?, and other similar work.

These books argue that "the Confederacy was the true moral victor in the Civil War...the Civil War was not fought over slavery," and "that the South should separate from the North all over again and form its own country."

In a 2001 interview with the local weekly Gambit, Milburn Calhoun endorsed secession from the United States ("Oh, we would be much better off that way"), said Southern slaveowners "took care of our slaves because they had value," and that "Racism is not hate based on skin color...There are people who devoutly hate Southerners. That’s racism. The most widespread hatred of today is against practicing Christians." The neo-Confederate books Pelican published were consistently among its biggest sellers.

=== After Milburn Calhoun ===
Milburn Calhoun died in 2012, after which his daughter Kathleen Calhoun Nettleton became publisher and president. James L. Calhoun died in 2019. During their ownership, Pelican's catalog had grown from 22 books to more than 2,000.

Acquisition by Arcadia Publishing

In 2019, Arcadia Publishing bought a majority interest in the company, bringing a majority of Pelican's past titles into their distribution, with notable exceptions for polemic and politically commentative titles released during the Calhoun Era. Pelican Publishing Company, still owned by the family of Nettleton (who died in 2021), retains rights on the aforementioned titles not included in the sale of the company.

In 2020, Arcadia Publishing acquired River Road Press, another publisher of books about New Orleans, Louisiana, and the surrounding region. Scott Campbell, River Road's founder, was named publisher of Pelican Publishing and the two company's catalogs were merged.

For a period beginning circa 2020, the headquarters was in New Orleans proper. Later that year, it moved to its current location.

== Notable Publications ==
Noteworthy titles from Pelican Publishing including:

- The Cajun Night Before Christmas – A reimagining of ‘Twas the Night penned by Trosclair and illustrated by James Rice, The Cajun Night Before Christmas was originally published by Pelican in 1973 and recognized in 2025 as the official children’s Christmas book of Louisiana. Pelican has since released a 50th anniversary edition, an abbreviated board book edition, a companion coloring book, and a commemorative ornament.
- Sherwood Anderson and Other Famous Creoles: A Gallery of Contemporary New Orleans - Originally published in 1926 and later published again in the Texas Quarterly in 1965, with Spratling’s permission.
- Puerto Rican Cookery – An English translation of the 1954 Spanish-language classic, “Cocina Criolla,” by renowned culinary talent Camen Aboy Valldej́uli. Puerto Rican Cookery is considered a cultural staple of Puerto Rican cuisine.
- Lord Honey: Traditional Southern Recipes with a Country Bling Twist and Lord Honey: Decadent Desserts: 8 Ingredients or Less – Authored by Chef Jason Smith, a popular TV personality and winner of the Food Network’s Holiday Baking Championship, season three. Lord Honey: Traditional Southern Recipes with a Country Bling Twist was originally published by Pelican in 2023 and contains award-winning recipes from Smith. The follow up, Lord Honey: Decadent Desserts: 8 Ingredients or Less, was published in 2024.
- The Dooky Chase Cookbook – This family legacy cookbook features original recipes from the James Beard award-winning restaurant by the same name. The Dooky Chase Cookbook intersperses the unforgettable culinary creations of Leah Chase with stories of the restaurant’s traditions, inspiration for the recipes, and a sampling of the African American art showcased in the restaurant dining room.
- Calhoun, Milburn; McGovern, Bernie (2012). Louisiana Almanac (19th ed.). ISBN 9781455614813. OCLC 1089603772. — a resource of statistical data and historical information related to Louisiana
- Kennedy, James Ronald; Kennedy, Walter Donald (1998). Was Jefferson Davis Right?. ISBN 9781565543706. OCLC 39256326. — a pseudohistorical defense of the U.S. Confederacy and the Lost Cause myth.
- Rea, Stephen (2009). Finn McCool's Football Club. ISBN 9781589806412. OCLC 246892085. — a memoir of an Irish pub before, during, and after Hurricane Katrina
