= Louisiana Almanac =

The 2006-2007 Louisiana Almanac

The Louisiana Almanac is a regularly updated reference work, published by the Gretna, Louisiana based Pelican Publishing Company. New editions have usually been produced every two to six years, but the most recent edition, the nineteenth, was published in 2012.

== Book synopsis ==
The Louisiana Almanac is a mesh of statistical data, historical information, and often obscure trivia relating to the State of Louisiana. Resources are provided in the following categories: general information, tourism, weather and climate, geography, population, sports, history, government, agriculture, economy, health, and transportation. Although often placed where relevant, maps, charts, and graphs are often printed poorly and can be difficult to interpret.

=== Chapters ===
The 2006-2007 edition was divided into thirty-one chapters (excluding a foreword, index and list of acknowledgments) and totals 757 pages.

- General Information (pgs. 7-28): Contains generally basic information included in most almanacs, including calendars, astronomical data, and tables of weights and measures
- Touring and Recreation (pgs. 29-91): Includes tourism-related information, largely devoted to state parks and various popular tourist attractions and historic places throughout Louisiana
- Museums, Exhibition Spaces, and Historic Sites (pgs. 92-105): Entire section is composed of a large chart detailing the locations and contact information of museums and other important sites in Louisiana.
- Fairs, Festivals, and Celebrations (pgs. 106-119): Chapter consists of a list of festivals held within Louisiana, each sorted chronologically by month, with the exception of Mardi Gras, which is detailed of its own accord
- History of Louisiana (pgs. 120-159): Contains a rather brief history of Louisiana (and the area that would later become Louisiana) beginning from the earliest known Indian settlement and including the state's various flags, the notes to the official state song, and related items.
- Important Dates in Louisiana History (pgs. 160-181): Chronicles significant dates in the history of the area including present-day Louisiana from Hernando de Soto's 1541 discovery of the Mississippi River to the impact of Hurricane Katrina in 2005.
- Louisiana Superlatives (pgs. 182-197): Consists entirely of various (often obscure) "firsts," "bests," and "worsts" in Louisiana history.
- Louisiana Weather and Climate (pgs. 198-217): Has a variety of weather-related information including all of the following: record temperature extremes, annual rainfall totals, historical hurricane landings, a guide to hurricane preparation and other related subtopics.
- Hurricanes Katrina and Rita (pgs. 218-225):
