= Ambassador Morgenthau's Story =

1918 book by Henry Morgenthau

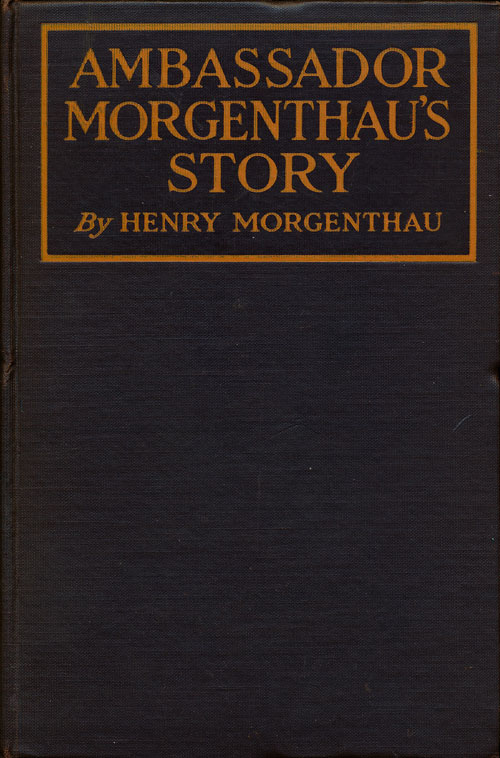
- Author: Henry Morgenthau Sr.
- Original title: Ambassador Morgenthau's Story
- Language: English
- Subject: Memoirs
- Publisher: Doubleday, Page
- Publication date: 1918
- Publication place: United States
- Media type: Print (Hardcover)
- Pages: 407 pages

Ambassador Morgenthau's Story (1918) is the title of the published memoirs of Henry Morgenthau Sr., U.S. Ambassador to the Ottoman Empire from 1913 to 1916, until the day of his resignation from the post. The book was dedicated to the then U.S. President Woodrow Wilson, and it took over two years to complete. The ghostwriter for Henry Morgenthau was Burton J. Hendrick; however, a comparison with official documents filed by Morgenthau in his role as ambassador shows that the book must have been structured and written extensively by Morgenthau himself.

The book is a primary source regarding the Armenian genocide, and the Greek genocide during the last years of the Ottoman Empire. When published, the book came under criticism by two prominent American historians regarding its coverage of Germany in the weeks before the onset of the war.

== Contents ==
The former U.S. Ambassador to the Ottoman Empire, Morgenthau relates his experience with German-Ottoman relations during the World War I. He referred to the CUP as the "boss system" inside the Ottoman Empire, and related how it proved useful to the German Empire to bring the Ottomans to their side. He also outlines the details of Germany's influence in preventing the sale of American warships to Greece, their plans for new territories, coaling stations, indemnities and the closing of the Dardanelles to separate the Russian Empire from the Allies during the World War I. It also contains information about Ottoman Empire's abrogation of the capitulations.

=== On the Defense of Van ===
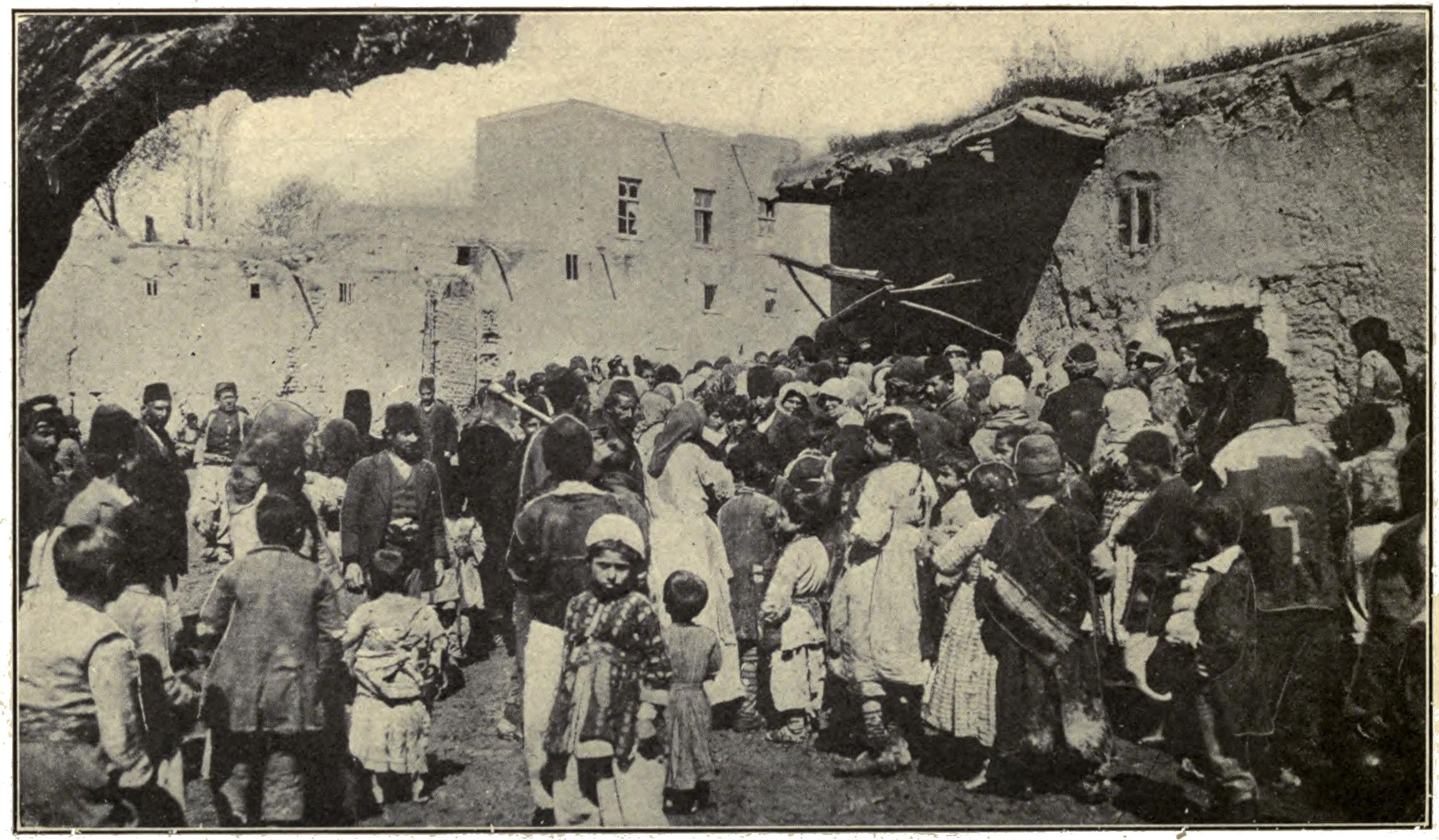
The book includes this picture of the Armenian refugees at Van. The Van had an Armenian provisional government which gave relief to the destitute.

Morgenthau reported from the Ottoman cities of Aleppo and Van. He quoted the testimonies of the consulate officials who justified the deportations as necessary and who also suggested a supposed complicity of the Armenian population of Van with the incoming Russian forces that had overtaken the city, a pretext they used as a justification for the persecution of all ethnic Armenians.

In his memoirs, Morgenthau later wrote that:

When the Turkish authorities gave the orders for these deportations, they were merely giving the death warrant to a whole race; they understood this well, and, in their conversations with me, they made no particular attempt to conceal the fact.

=== Discussions with Ottoman leaders ===
Audio recording of Chapter 24, "The Murder of a Nation", from Ambassador Morgenthau's Story

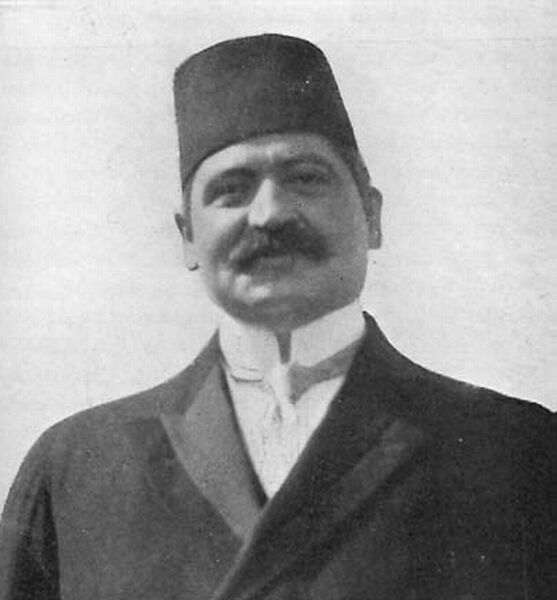
Photograph of Mehmet Talat Pasha as provided in his memoirs

It took some time before the story of the Armenian atrocities reached the U.S. Embassy with all its details. Ambassador Morgenthau subsequently raised the issue in person with Talaat Pasha and Enver Pasha. When Morgenthau asked both whether the information reaching the embassy was reliable, they regarded it as a mere manifestation of the disorders that had prevailed inside the Armenian provinces for many years. When the consular reports came from Van and Urfa, both Enver and Talaat Pasha dismissed them as wild exaggerations.

The ambassador asked the U.S. Government to intervene, but the United States was not a participant in the World War I at the time and could only have made written or verbal protests to the Ottoman authorities. This was not done and Morgenthau was left without leverage beyond his personal rapport with those in power; when that failed too, he then drew international media attention to the ongoing Armenian genocide, organized private relief efforts and helped create the American Committee for Armenian and Syrian Relief (ACASR).

== Reception ==
According to Thomas de Waal, the evidence in the book was so damning that some Armenian Genocide deniers have tried to disprove it, although much of the book's contents are verified by diplomatic cables and Morgenthau's access to the Ottoman leaders has been corroborated by other sources.

== Gallery ==
Photographs contained in the memoirs include:

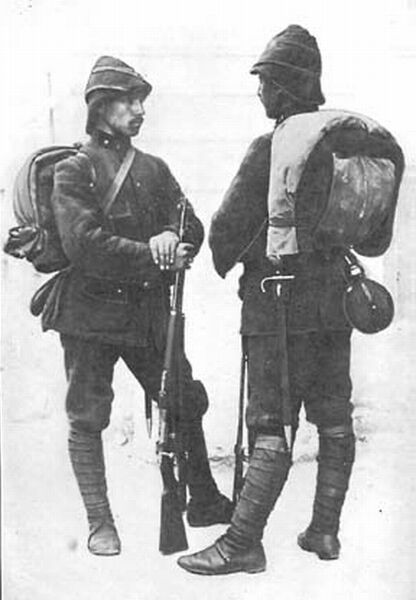

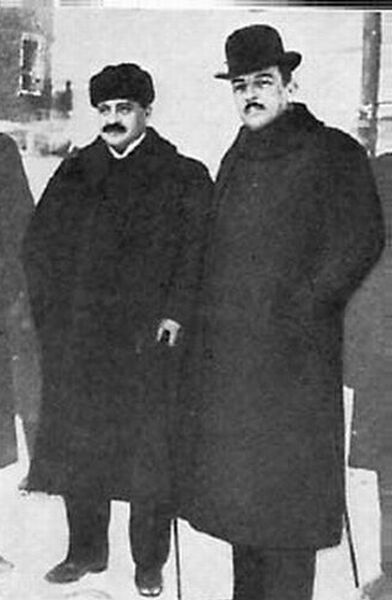
Mehmet Talat Pasha and Richard von Kühlmann

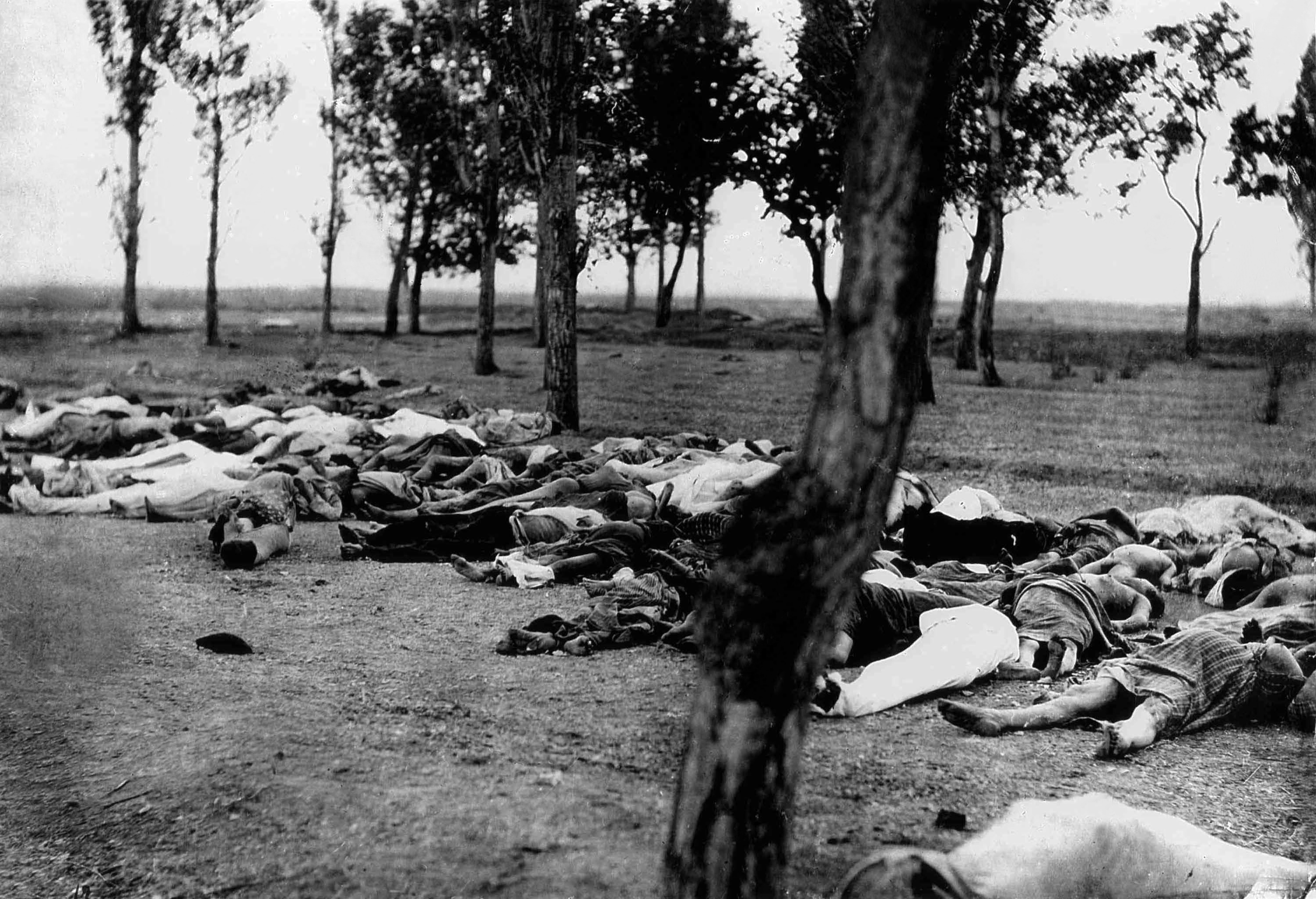
Caption from the book: "THOSE WHO FELL BY THE WAYSIDE. Scenes like this were common all over the Armenian provinces, in the spring and summer months of 1915. Death in its several forms—massacre, starvation, exhaustion—destroyed the larger part of the refugees. The Turkish policy was that of extermination under the guise of deportation"

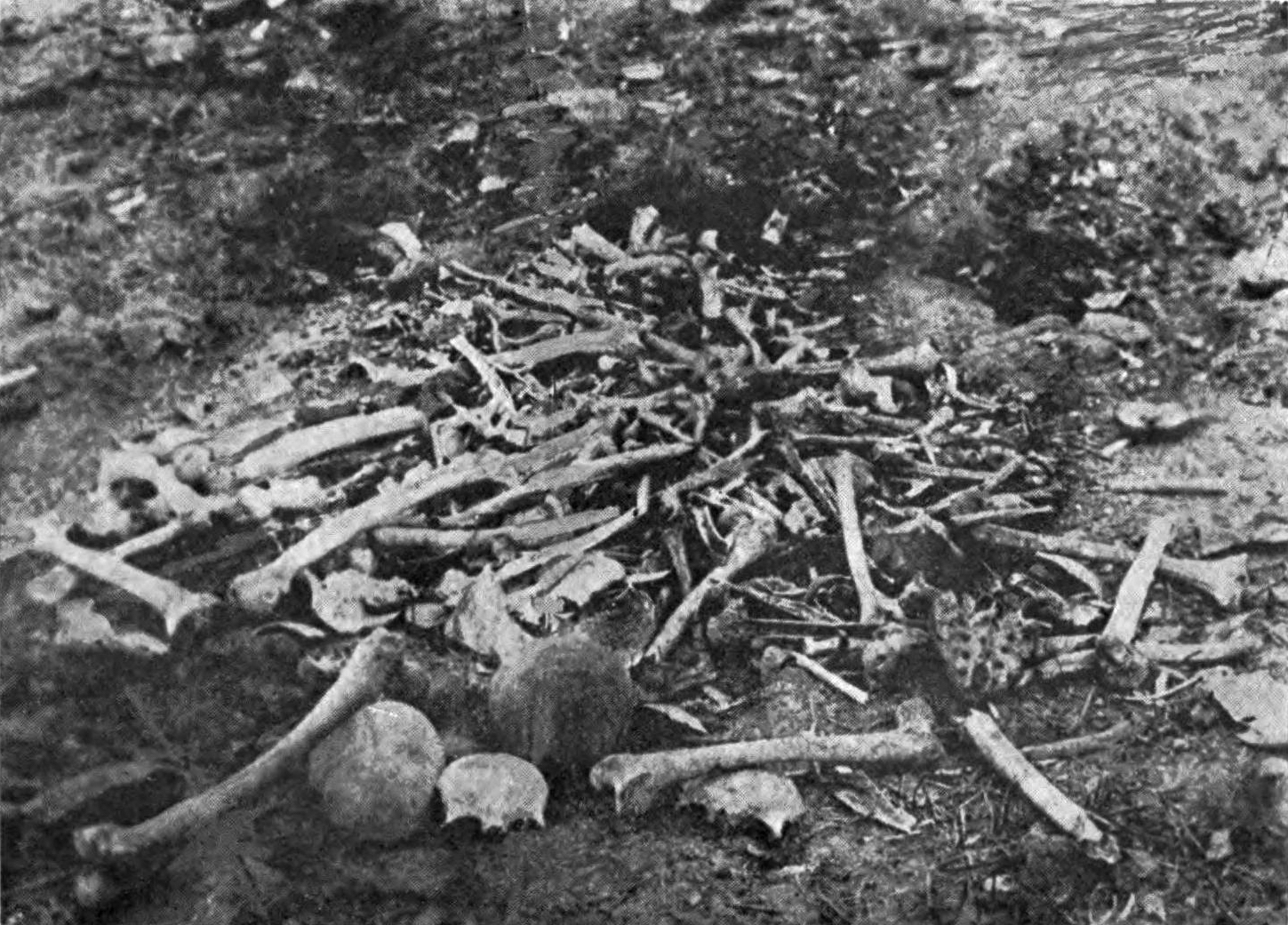
Caption from the book: A RELIC OF THE ARMENIAN MASSACRES AT ERZINGAN. Such mementos are found all over Armenia".

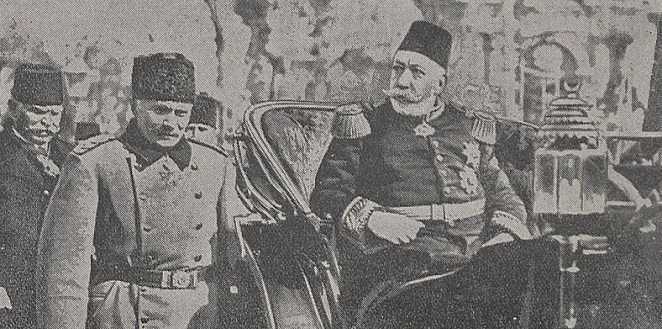

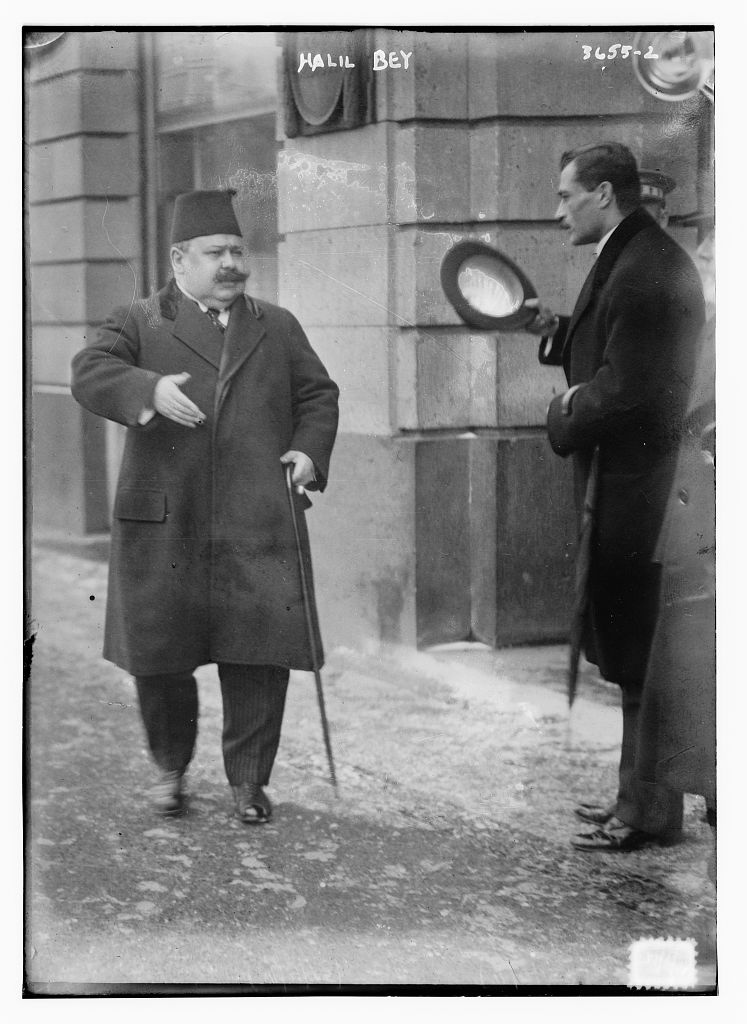

== Editions ==
- Morgenthau, Henry (1918). Ambassador Morgenthau's Story. Doubleday, Page & Co.
  - Original republished in 2003 by the Gomidas Institute, with an introduction by Ara Sarafian. A new and enhanced version of this edition was published by the Gomidas Institute in 2016. ISBN 978-1909382213.
  - Republished by Wayne State University Press in 2003, edited by Peter Balakian, with a foreword by Robert Jay Lifton, an introduction by Roger W. Smith, and an epilogue by Henry Morgenthau III. ISBN 978-0814329795.
