= Burton J. Hendrick =

American author and editor (1870–1949)

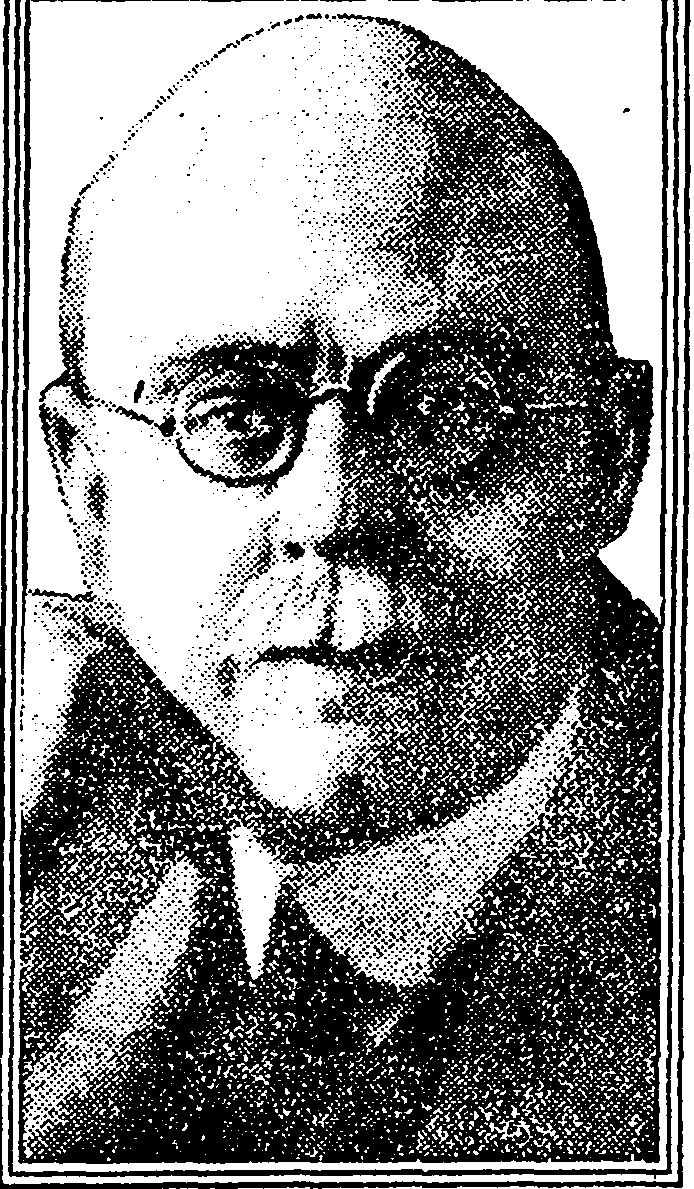
Hendrick in 1929

Burton Jesse Hendrick (December 8, 1870 – March 23, 1949), born in New Haven, Connecticut, was an American author. While attending Yale University, Hendrick was editor of both The Yale Courant and The Yale Literary Magazine. He received his BA in 1895 and his master's in 1897 from Yale. After completing his degree work, Hendrick became editor of the New Haven Morning News. In 1905, after writing for The New York Evening Post and The New York Sun, Hendrick left newspapers and became a "muckraker" writing for McClure's Magazine. His "The Story of Life-Insurance" exposé appeared in McClure's in 1906. Following his career at McClure's, Hendrick went to work in 1913 at Walter Hines Page's World's Work magazine as an associate editor. In 1919, Hendrick began writing biographies, when he was the ghostwriter of Ambassador Morgenthau's Story for Henry Morgenthau, Sr.

In 1921 he won the Pulitzer Prize for History for The Victory at Sea, which he co-authored with William Sowden Sims, the 1923 Pulitzer Prize for Biography or Autobiography for The Life and Letters of Walter H. Page, and the 1929 Pulitzer Prize for Biography or Autobiography for The Training of an American.

In 1919 Hendrick published the Age of Big Business by using a series of individual biographies to create an enthusiastic look at the foundation of the corporation in America and the rapid rise of the United States as a world power. After completing the commissioned biography of Andrew Carnegie, Hendrick turned to writing group biographies. There is an obvious gap in the later works published by Hendrick between 1940 and 1946, which is explained by his work on a biography on Andrew Mellon, which was commissioned by the Mellon family, but never published.

At the time of his death, Hendrick was working on a biography of Louise Whitfield Carnegie, the wife of Andrew Carnegie.

== Books ==
- 1919 Ambassador Morgenthau's Story
- 1920 The Victory at Sea (with William Sims)
- 1921 Hendrick, Burton J (1921). The age of big business; a chronicle of the captains of industry. New Haven: Yale University Press.
- 1923 Life and Letters of Walter H. Page
- 1923 Hendrick., Burton J (1923). The Jews in America. Garden City, NY: Doubleday, Page & Company.
- 1924 Gorgas, Marie D.; Hendrick, Burton J. (1924). William Crawford Gorgas: His Life and Work. Garden City, NY: Doubleday, Page and Company.
- 1928 The Training of an American: The Earlier Life and Letters of Walter H Page
- 1932 The Life of Andrew Carnegie
- 1935 The Lees of Virginia: Biography of a Family
- 1937 Bulwark of the Republic, A Biography of the Constitution
- 1939 Statesmen of the Lost Cause: Jefferson Davis and his Cabinet
- 1946 Lincoln's War Cabinet

== See also ==
- The Life of Mary Baker G. Eddy and the History of Christian Science
- The Story of Life Insurance – a series of articles published in McClure's Magazine in 1906 and compiled into a book during the following year
