= Rembert W. Patrick =

American historian (1909–1967)

Rembert Wallace Patrick
- Born: 1909
- Died: 1967 (aged 57–58)
- Occupations: Historian, professor

Rembert Wallace Patrick (1909–1967) was an American historian, longtime University of Florida history professor, and prolific author of works on Florida's history, particularly the Reconstruction Era. The Florida Historical Society gives out an award named in his honor.

== Bibliography ==
- The reconstruction of the Nation (10 editions)
- Jefferson Davis and His Cabinet
- Florida under five flags
- The fall of Richmond
- Florida fiasco; rampant rebels on the Georgia-Florida border, 1810-1815
- Aristocrat in uniform, General Duncan L. Clinch
- The story of Florida
- History of Florida (textbook)
- Twenty-five stories complete in themselves (a collection on the discovery and development of America)
- Race relations in the South
