= USS W. S. Sims =

Knox-class frigate of the United States Navy

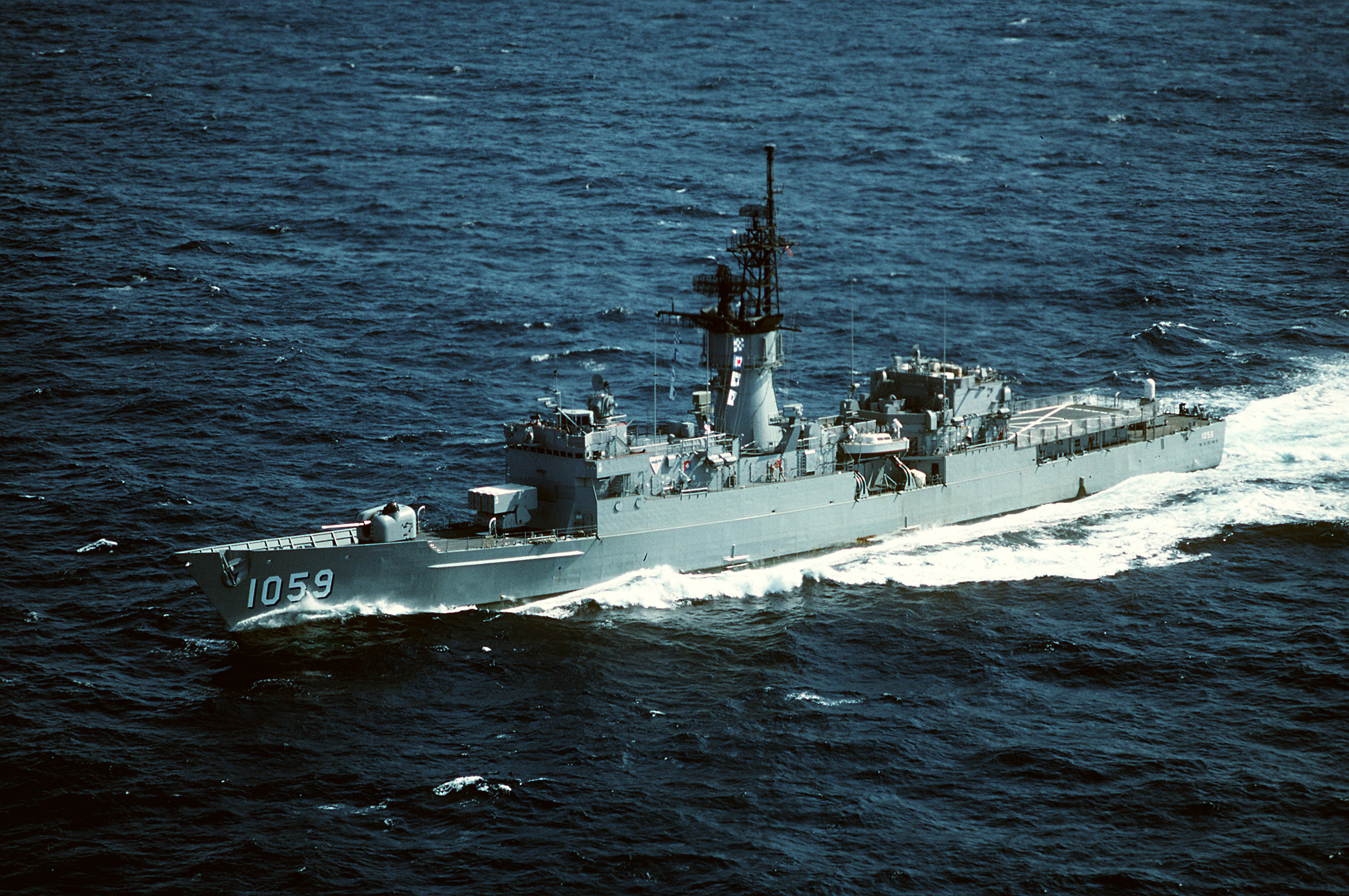
- USS W.S. Sims (FF-1059)

History

United States
- Name: USS W.S. Sims
- Ordered: 22 July 1964
- Builder: Avondale Shipyard, Westwego, Louisiana
- Laid down: 10 April 1967
- Launched: 4 January 1969
- Sponsored by: Mrs. Robert H. Hopkins
- Commissioned: 3 January 1970
- Decommissioned: 6 September 1991
- Stricken: 11 January 1995
- Fate: Transferred to Turkey for spare parts, 21 December 1999

General characteristics
- Class & type: Knox-class frigate
- Displacement: 3,215 tons (4,196 full load)
- Length: 438 ft (133.5 m)
- Beam: 46 ft 9 in (14.25 m)
- Draught: 24 ft 9 in (7.6 m)
- Propulsion: 2 × CE 1200psi boilers; 1 Westinghouse geared turbine; 1 shaft, 35,000 SHP (26 MW)
- Speed: over 27 knots (50 km/h)
- Range: 4,500 nautical miles (8,330 km) @ 20 knots (37 km/h)
- Complement: 18 officers, 267 enlisted
- Sensors & processing systems: AN/SPS-40 Air Search Radar; AN/SPS-67 Surface Search Radar; AN/SQS-26 Sonar; AN/SQR-18 Towed array sonar system; Mk68 Gun Fire Control System
- Electronic warfare & decoys: AN/SLQ-32 Electronics Warfare System
- Armament: one Mk-16 8 cell missile launcher for ASROC and Harpoon missiles; one Mk-42 5-inch/54 caliber gun; Mark 46 torpedoes from four single tube launchers); one Mk-25 BPDMS launcher for Sea Sparrow missiles, later replaced by Phalanx CIWS
- Aircraft carried: one SH-2 Seasprite (LAMPS I) helicopter

USS W.S. Sims (FF-1059) was a Knox-class frigate of the United States Navy named for William Sims. She was in commission from 1970 to 1991.

== Construction and commissioning ==
W.S. Sims was laid down on 10 April 1967, by Avondale Shipyards, Inc., Westwego, Louisiana. She was launched on 5 January 1969, sponsored by Mrs. Robert H. Hopkins (daughter of Admiral Sims), and commissioned on 3 January 1970. W.S. Sims was originally commissioned as a Destroyer Escort (DE), but was later decommissioned, modified and then recommissioned as a Fast Frigate (FF).

== History ==
Following an extended fitting-out period at the Charleston Naval Shipyard and a restricted availability at Jacksonville Shipyard for correction of minor construction faults, W.S. Sims became fully operational in June 1970, and proceeded to Guantánamo Bay, Cuba, for shakedown training. After a two and one-half-month post-shakedown availability at the Charleston Naval Shipyard to correct deficiencies uncovered during shakedown and to install additional equipment, W.S. Sims was put to sea in November to evaluate the feasibility of installing the light airborne multi-purpose system (LAMPS). She was the first ship of her class to have a crewed helicopter land on her deck and, during the next four days, she successfully demonstrated the capability of these new ships to operate crewed helicopters. Upon completion of the testing, the escort proceeded to her home port, Mayport, Florida, for the holiday season.

On 11 January 1971, W.S. Sims left Mayport with personnel from the Key West Testing and Evaluation Detachment embarked. The project consisted of six cruises, numbered 0 to 5, where W.S. Sims operated with various types of submarines in order to determine the capabilities and limitations of the installed long range underwater sound detection equipment. The tests continued throughout the year and took the escort to such ports as New Orleans; Fredriksted, St. Croix; San Juan, Puerto Rico; and Nassau, Bahamas.

The ship returned to Mayport in time for Thanksgiving and, between 22 November and 31 December 1971, was involved in a fleet standdown period, during which officials representing the squadron, flotilla, and type commanders conducted a series of inspections.

The final cruise for the Key West testing project began on 4 January 1972. W.S. Sims returned to Mayport on 15 January and spent the next month preparing for operations with the 6th Fleet.

On 15 February 1972, the ocean escort sailed for the Caribbean to participate in "LantFltRedEx 2-72" and then proceeded on to the Mediterranean. On 10 March, W.S. Sims inchopped to the 6th Fleet and took part in various antisubmarine exercises besides visiting Barcelona, Spain, and Naples, Italy. From 27 March to 6 April, the destroyer escort and William V. Pratt maintained a close surveillance of Soviet naval units in the south central Mediterranean.

W.S. Sims visited Gaeta, Italy, and Golfe Juan, France, before taking part in Operation "Quickdraw", a combined United States and Italian naval exercise held on 17 April. A visit to Sanremo, Italy, and tender availability at Naples followed the exercise.

On 8 May 1972, the ship joined in a combined naval exercise, Operation "Dawn Patrol", with British, French, and Italian warships. After visiting Sfax, Tunisia, W.S. Sims conducted special surveillance operations on Soviet submarines from 23 May to 10 June. The ship then participated in Operation "Good Friendship" with the Turkish Navy and a second Operation "Quick Draw" with the Italian Navy. During August, the crew enjoyed leave at Sanremo, Italy; Barcelona, Spain; and Theoule, France. When Vreeland relieved W.S. Sims late that month, the latter headed home and returned to Mayport on 5 September.

Upon completing a month-long standdown period, the ship commenced an extended availability at the Jacksonville Shipyards, Jacksonville, Florida, which lasted through the end of the year and the first three months of 1973. The ship then carried out post-availability sea trials. The discrepancies which the testing uncovered were corrected by 9 April. The following day, the ocean escort steamed south to Roosevelt Roads, Puerto Rico, and joined the surface missile fleet in gunfire support exercises conducted at the Atlantic Fleet weapons range, Culebra Island.

On 8 May 1973, W.S. Sims arrived at Guantanamo Bay, Cuba, for refresher training, but an engineering casualty soon forced her to return to Mayport for repairs. When the corrections had been made, she returned to Cuba and conducted refresher training from the end of May to mid-June. Upon returning to Mayport, the ship executed a LAMPS workup from 17 June to 9 July.

From 12 to 26 July, W.S. Sims participated in "LantRedEx 1-74" in the Caribbean. As her next assignment, the ship evaluated the basic point defense missile. The ocean escort returned to her home port on 10 August, enabling the crew to enjoy a period of leave and liberty.

W.S. Sims sailed for North Atlantic and Mediterranean operations on 14 September. Upon arrival, the ship held a LAMPS demonstration for the Royal Netherlands Navy in Amsterdam. At the time of W.S. Sims' inchop to the 6th Fleet, the Middle East was in a state of war. For the first month and one-half, the ocean escort's duties involved operations in support of United States interests in the Middle East crisis. From 26 November to 30, W.S. Sims guarded the King of Morocco embarked on the French luxury liner Roussilion en route to the Arab oil conference held in Algiers, Algeria. The King, as a gesture of gratitude, sent the officers and men a gift of three tons of oranges, tangerines, sardines, and orange juice. After visiting Naples, Italy, and Rota, Spain, W.S. Sims spent the 1973 holiday season at Valencia, Spain.

On 4 January 1974, W.S. Sims stood out of Valencia harbor to operate with Independence. After a visit to Rota and exercises with America, the escort ship participated in a search for survivors of a small British trawler; and four of six missing sailors were recovered. On 25 January, she proceeded via Gibraltar to Casablanca, Morocco, where she arrived on 1 February. The following day, the Soviet military attache came on board for a special tour of the ship. After brief stops at Rota and at Bermuda, W.S. Sims arrived at Mayport on 14 February.

=== 1975–1980 ===
During March and April, the ship took part in interim-sea-control ship-evaluation operations in waters between Jacksonville and Charleston. She returned to her home port on 27 April and underwent various inspections. The escort ship commenced tender availability on 6 May. On 1 July 1975, W.S. Sims was reclassified a frigate and redesignated FF-1059.

On 7 August, W.S. Sims sailed for the Portsmouth (New Hampshire) Naval Shipyard for repairs in drydock. She returned to Mayport on 19 September and spent the rest of the year and the first part of 1975 in training and in improving the physical condition of the ship.

On 15 April 1975, the frigate joined in Fleet Exercise "Agate Punch" which involved naval air, surface, subsurface, and land forces. The exercise ended on the 27th, and W.S. Sims proceeded to the naval weapons station where she offloaded weapons in preparation for going into the shipyard in June.

The ship suffered an engineering casualty on 30 April and was towed to Charleston for repairs. Upon her arrival back at Mayport on 8 May, W.S. Sims commenced a month-long tender availability. The escort ship got underway on 11 June for Philadelphia for a nine-month overhaul. The ship went into drydock on 21 June and remained there until 8 December; and, after she was refloated, work renewing the ship continued into the spring of 1976.

After tests and sea trials in the Virginia capes area, the ship returned to Mayport on 14 April 1976. From the 23rd to the 27th of that month, W.S. Sims was moored at Port Everglades and then got underway for Andros Island and trials to evaluate new antisubmarine warfare equipment. She next returned to Mayport and conducted operations in the Jacksonville area.

W.S. Sims arrived at Guantanamo Bay, Cuba, on 23 May and spent the next five weeks in intensive training. After an operational readiness evaluation and gunfire support qualifications at Roosevelt Roads, Puerto Rico, the ship returned to Mayport on 2 July. Tender availability occupied the month of July and continued into August. After completing several inspections, W.S. Sims got underway on 2 September for a North Atlantic crossing.

En route, she participated in Operation "Joint Effort", a series of exercises conducted in a task group environment. On 14 September, W.S. Sims was 700 yards (600 m) aft of John F. Kennedy when Bordelon collided with that carrier and searched the nearby waters for any men who might have been thrown overboard.

The North Atlantic cruise was divided into four separate operations. "Joint Effort", conducted during the crossing, was a workup phase. "Teamwork 76" was a major NATO exercise involving the forces of the United States, Great Britain, Belgium, Denmark, West Germany, the Netherlands, and Norway. It included a show of strength in the North Cape area. "Baltic Operations" was conducted in the Baltic Sea and was an exercise in fleet steaming in a confined area. "Bonded Item", the final exercise, was an exercise designed around an amphibious assault at Jutland.

On 27 October 1976, W.S. Sims departed Edinburgh, Scotland; headed home and arrived at Mayport on 9 November. The ship spent the remainder of 1976 and January 1977 in availability. Shipyard work and underway training occupied February. On 1 March, a propulsion examining board embarked; and the ship passed in all respects. During the remainder of the month, the escort ship prepared for an upcoming deployment.

W.S. Sims departed Mayport on 30 March, bound for Lisbon, Portugal, and a six and one-half-month Mediterranean deployment. A severe storm with 20- to 30-foot (9 m) seas, encountered en route, damaged the main mast to the point where it had to be supported by riggings of mooring lines. As a result, the ship arrived in Rota rather than Lisbon and remained there from 12 April to 13 May undergoing repairs.

The destroyer escort then conducted operations in the areas of Crete, Greece, Tunisia, and Sicily. W.S. Sims arrived at Alexandria, Egypt, on 8 August and, during her visit there, was visited by the American consul general, the Governor of Alexandria, and the Commander in Chief of the Egyptian Navy. She then departed for Augusta Bay, Sicily.

"National Week XXIII" began on 15 August and consisted of intensive war games involving both 6th Fleet task groups, elements of the Italian Navy, and American Air Force planes. The exercise concluded on 22 August, when the fleet anchored off Taranto, Italy, for debriefing.

The crew enjoyed a port visit to Palma de Mallorca, Spain, before going to sea for "Bystander" operations near Gibraltar. After a tender availability at Naples, W.S. Sims joined the NATO Exercise "Display Determination"—already in progress—on 24 September. When the exercise ended, the escort ship acted as the sole escort for Independence as they visited Malaga and Rota, Spain. On 14 October, W.S. Sims, along with Independence and several other ships, departed Rota and arrived at Mayport on the 21st.

The ship spent most of November undergoing tender availability and, on the 28th, participated in Operation "Marcot", a joint operation with the Canadian Navy.

On 3 December, while operating near Bermuda, the ship lost all power due to an engineering failure. The ship had no power to any equipment except those powered by batteries. An aircraft responded to distress flares and contacted surface ships in the area. USS Ainsworth responded and came alongside, "skin to skin" on the high seas, with all lines tripled. In the midst of six-foot swells, there began heavy movement between the two ships causing frequent contact, buckling several frames in the midships section, and causing considerable superficial damage to the starboard side. After temporary repairs were made, all lines were cleared, and W.S. Sims returned to home port for repairs. The year 1977 ended with the destroyer escort in restricted availability, conducting repairs on both diesels and structural repairs to the starboard side.

W.S. Sims remained in restricted availability into March 1978. On the 8th, she joined units of the 2d Fleet in the Caribbean for Exercise "Safepass "78". The ship then proceeded north to provide services for Hammerhead. After refueling at New London, Connecticut, W.S. Sims arrived back at Mayport on 24 March and began an upkeep period until 6 April.

After successfully undergoing an operational propulsion plant exam, the frigate got underway for the Caribbean and Exercise "Comptuex;" then headed up the Cooper River to moor at the Charleston Naval Station on 27 April. After onloading weapons, the ship returned to her home port for availability and upkeep which lasted through 5 June.

W.S. Sims conducted tests and inspections at sea, followed by an in port period from 13 to 28 June, during which she completed preparations for the upcoming Mediterranean cruise. On 29 June, the frigate sailed for her fourth and longest Mediterranean cruise. Following her Atlantic crossing, the ship arrived in Malaga on 9 July. After a brief run to Naples, she received on board Admiral H. E. Shear, Commander in Chief, Allied Forces, Southern Europe.

The ship got underway on 29 July for Augusta Bay, Sicily, and for operations in the Ionian Sea. "National Week XXV" was held from 23 July to 5 August. After visiting ports in Greece, she participated in "Anti-Aircraft Warfare Week" and returned to Naples on 21 August. During the last week of August, the Chief of Naval Operations, Admiral Thomas B. Hayward, paid a visit to tour the ship.

The month of September found W.S. Sims taking part in Operation "Ocean Missilex" in the eastern Mediterranean; Operation "Display Determination-78", a combined NATO operation; and conducting antisubmarine warfare exercises with a Greek destroyer squadron and an opposing Greek submarine. The end of the month found W.S. Sims conducting tests with French submarine Daphne and NATO's oceanographic research ship Maria Paola Gee.

Upon returning to La Spezia, Italy, on 2 November 1978, the ship took part in "Antisubmarine Warfare Week" from 7 November to 14 and then underwent intermediate maintenance availability at Cartagena, Spain. The frigate arrived at Toulon, France, on 9 December for a 10-day visit. W.S. Sims spent the holiday season from 21 December until the year ended in Alicante, Spain.

Late in January 1979, W.S. Sims departed Malaga; and she arrived at Mayport in February. She remained at her home port through May preparing for an upcoming shipyard period. After a brief visit to Portland, Maine, W.S. Sims reported to the Bath Iron Works, Bath, Maine, on 7 May 1979 for an overhaul.

She was scheduled to return to Mayport in March 1980 and resume operations.

== Decommissioning and disposal ==
W.S. Sims was decommissioned on 6 September 1991 and stricken from the Naval Vessel Register on 11 January 1995. She was transferred to Turkey on 21 December 1999 as a parts hulk.

On 15 March 1991 at 2100 hours, the USS W.S. Sims suffered a boiler explosion. Following a BECCE (Basic Engineering Casualty Control Exercises), the boiler was secured as part of training. When the backup diesel generator failed to function properly, the decision was made to try to execute a "residual steam light off" of the boiler. The crew was able to get a fire lit in the boiler briefly but, without any electricity to monitor and control fuel & oxygen valves, the combustion would not stay stable. After several unsuccessful attempts, the space was evacuated due to extremely high temperatures (no ventilation in space). Shortly after the space was empty, the high temperatures inside the boiler and leftover fuel used in the residual light off attempts ignited and caused a fireball to shoot out of the "mack" (main mast & exhaust stack). The crew assembled a makeshift radio run on marine batteries, and they were able to contact authorities and request assistance.

A US Coast Guard cutter arrived on scene, rendered assistance, and towed the USS W.S. Sims until a US Navy tug, which was originally on route to Roosevelt Roads Naval Base in Puerto Rico, was diverted to relieve the Coast Guard cutter and take the USS W.S. Sims to Puerto Rico. The crew of the USS W.S. Sims maintained their ship for four days with no power, retrieving water from four decks below by hand pumping and carrying buckets to the flight deck. No fatalities occurred and only minor injuries were suffered.
