= USS Admiral W. S. Sims =

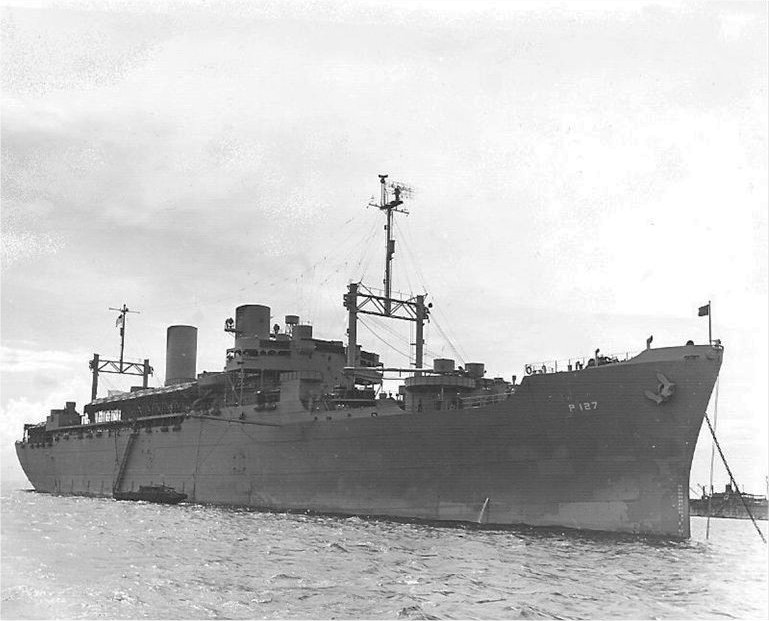
- USS Admiral W. S. Sims (AP-127) at anchor.

History

United States
- Name: Admiral W. S. Sims (AP-127)
- Namesake: Admiral William S. Sims, US Navy
- Builder: Bethlehem Shipbuilding Corp, Alameda, CA
- Laid down: 15 June 1944
- Launched: 4 June 1945
- Commissioned: 27 September 1945
- Renamed: USAT Admiral W. S. Sims, c. August 1946
- Renamed: USAT General William O. Darby
- Namesake: General William O. Darby, US Army
- Renamed: USNS General William O. Darby (T-AP-127), 1 March 1950
- Reclassified: Miscellaneous Unclassified IX-510, October 1981
- Decommissioned: April 1991
- Stricken: 26 October 1993
- Identification: IMO number: 8424654
- Honors and awards: 1 battle star for Vietnam War
- Fate: Sold for scrapping

General characteristics
- Class & type: Admiral W. S. Benson-class transport
- Displacement: 9,676 tons light; 20,120 tons full load
- Length: 608 feet 11 inches (185.60 m)
- Beam: 75 feet 6 inches (23.01 m)
- Draft: 26 feet 11 inches (8.20 m)
- Installed power: 19,000 shp
- Propulsion: turbo-electric transmission, twin screw
- Speed: 19 knots (35 km/h)
- Complement: 618
- Armament: None

USS Admiral W. S. Sims (AP-127) was a transport in the United States Navy. She was later renamed USNS General William O. Darby (T-AP-127). Later her name was struck and she was known simply by her hull number. In 1981, she was reclassified as IX-510.

== Admiral W. S. Sims ==
Admiral W. S. Sims was laid down on 15 June 1944 at Alameda, California, by the Bethlehem Shipbuilding Corporation at Alameda, California, under a United States Maritime Commission contract (MC null 685); launched on 4 June 1945; sponsored by Mrs. Anne Hitchcock Sims, widow of Admiral William Sims; delivered to the Navy on 27 September 1945 and commissioned the same day.

Following shakedown training out of San Pedro and post-shakedown availability at the Todd Shipyards at Wilmington, Los Angeles, the transport sailed for the Philippines on 20 October with 222 passengers. She arrived at Manila on 6 November, and departed the Philippine port with 4,980 troops and passengers, arriving at San Francisco on 25 November. She commenced her second round-trip voyage to the Philippines with her departure from San Francisco on 7 December. Arriving at Manila on the 22d, the transport sailed for home two days after Christmas. Re-routed on her return voyage, Admiral W. S. Sims reached San Pedro with 4,973 passengers on board on 11 January 1946. She subsequently conducted one troop lift from Okinawa, sailing from San Pedro on 3 February 1946, and bringing home 4,988 Army troops to Seattle, Washington on 6 March.

Admiral W. S. Sims made one more voyage to the Far East as a Navy transport. After shifting down the west coast from Seattle to San Francisco, she sailed from the latter port on 27 March for Korean waters, with 2,966 Army troops embarked. The transport arrived at Jinsen (now Inchon), on 11 April 1946, and, after embarking 106 passengers at Jinsen sailed for Okinawa, arriving there on 15 April and embarking 910 additional passengers. Clearing Buckner Bay for the Philippines on 16 April, the ship disembarked 26 people at Manila, and embarked 4,106 others for passage to the west coast of the United States. Admiral W. S. Sims reached San Francisco on 7 May.

Decommissioned at San Francisco on 21 June 1946, she was simultaneously transferred to the War Shipping Administration. Admiral W. S. Sims was struck from the Naval Vessel Register on 3 July 1946.

== General William O. Darby ==
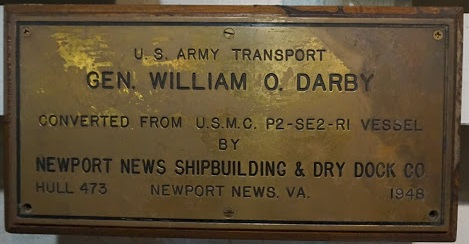
Builder plate from the US Army transport General William O. Darby

Turned over to the Army for operation with the Army Transport Service (ATS), the ship was renamed General William O. Darby in honor of Brigadier General William O. Darby, USA (1911–1945), leader of the famed World War II "Darby's Rangers" who distinguished themselves in combat in North Africa, in Sicily, and in Italy. He was killed in action on the Italian front on 30 April 1945, while serving as Assistant Commander of the 10th Mountain Division.

After operations with the ATS as USAT General William O. Darby, the ship was reacquired by the Navy on 1 March 1950 and reinstated on the Naval Vessel Register on 28 April 1950 as USNS General William O. Darby (T-AP-127). Operating out of New York under the Military Sea Transportation Service (MSTS), the transport steamed between Europe and the Mediterranean Sea carrying troops on rotation, military dependents, and supplies. Between 1950 and 1953, she made more than 20 round trip voyages to Bremerhaven, Germany, and back. In November 1951, the ship veered 100 miles off course to respond to an SOS from a German freighter in the Bay of Biscay. Thirteen of General William O. Darby's sailors volunteered to man a lifeboat and brave the 30-foot seas to transfer a critically burned German sailor to the transport for medical treatment.

Departing New York on 20 June 1953, General William O. Darby proceeded to Yokosuka, Japan, via the Panama Canal, arriving at the Japanese port on 17 July to embark Korean War veterans. Returning to Seattle on 29 July, the transport made five more round-trip voyages between the west coast of the United States and Japan in the next five months. After returning to San Francisco on 23 January 1954, she sailed for the east coast on the 25th to resume operations with MSTS (Atlantic), and reached New York on 8 February. In 1954 and 1955, the ship conducted 12 and 13 round-trips, respectively, and, in the first six months of 1956, conducted seven before being deployed to the Mediterranean to support the operations of the 6th Fleet.

Ranging from North Africa to Turkey in that tour, she eventually returned to New York on 6 August 1956. Between 1956 and 1965, the ship conducted some 135 runs to Bremerhaven and back, deploying to the Mediterranean on nine occasions. In this period the ship took part in the mass movement of 50,000 troops to Cherbourg and Bremerhaven in the Berlin crisis in the autumn of 1961, the biggest troop-lift for MSTS since the s:Korean Armistice Agreement in 1953. In February 1963, General William O. Darby brought back from Bremerhaven two paintings loaned temporarily to the United States from the French Louvre, Whistler's Mother and La Madeleine. Scheduled to be shown at a succession of art galleries from New York to Atlanta, the two art treasures were met upon arrival at Pier 4, Brooklyn Army Terminal, by cultural attaches from the French embassy.

With the buildup of American strength in South Vietnam in 1965, all six MSTS (Atlantic) transports, including General William O. Darby, were withdrawn from the New York-to-Bremerhaven run and assigned to duty in the Pacific. Transatlantic sailings were canceled in late July 1965. General William O. Darby and her sister ship, USNS General Alexander M. Patch, carried out the longest point-to-point trooplift in MSTS history when they arrived at Vũng Tàu, South Vietnam, on 13 August 1966 with 3,124 troops embarked between them, having sailed from Boston a voyage of 12,358 miles. They had departed the east coast on 15 July, transited the Panama Canal on the 20th, and fueled at Long Beach on the 27th. The longest leg of the voyage was non-stop, Long Beach to Vung Tau, a distance of some 7,291 nautical miles (13,503 km). The Pacific leg of the trip was for the most part smooth for the whole crossing with the exception of a day or two of 15 foot swells. Since there were no docking facilities in Vung Tau, the troops were transported to shore on landing craft.

Placed in reserve at Caven Point Army Depot in New York harbor in 1968, General William O. Darby was stricken from the Naval Vessel Register on 9 January 1969 and transferred to the Maritime Commission's reserve fleet. At one point in 1976, the state of Maryland expressed an interest in alleviating its overcrowded correctional facilities by the use of the ship. Vehement objections to the retention of the name of the Army war hero on a ship designated to incarcerate prisoners apparently arose, contributing in large part to the cancellation of the ship's name on 6 July 1976. The ship, herself, now merely the unnamed T-AP-127, remained on the Naval Vessel Register.

== Awards ==
- World War II Victory Medal
- Navy Occupation Medal with "EUROPE" clasp
- National Defense Service Medal with star
- Korean Service Medal
- Vietnam Campaign Medal with one battle star
- United Nations Service Medal
- Korean War Service Medal (Korea)
- Republic of Vietnam Campaign Medal

== IX-510 ==
Reclassified as IX-510 in October 1981, the ship was towed from her berth in the James River to the Norfolk Naval Shipyard, where she was placed in service on 1 July 1982. In 1987, she was serving as a barracks and accommodation ship at the Norfolk Naval Shipyard, providing berthing and messing facilities for ships undergoing work at the yard. IX-510 was returned to the James River reserve fleet in April 1991, stricken from the Naval Vessel Register in October 1993, and transferred to full Maritime Administration ownership in May 1999. In February 2005 she was towed to Brownsville, Texas, to be dismantled.
