= William Sims =

American admiral, diplomat and historian

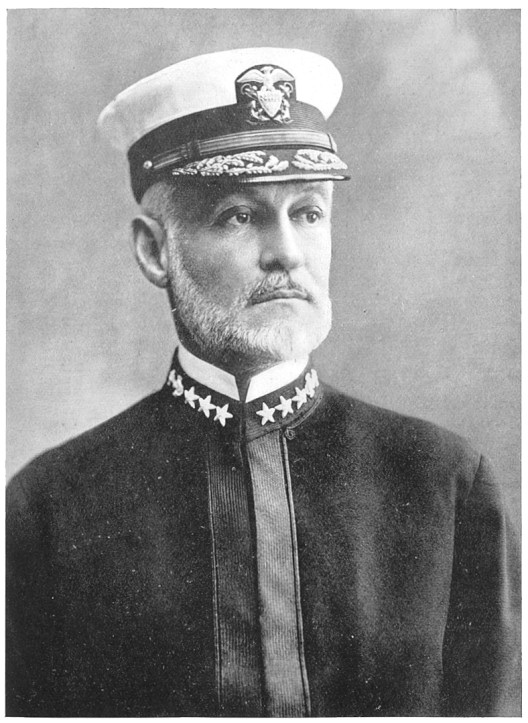
- Born: William Sowden Sims; October 15, 1858; Port Hope, Canada West (now Canada)
- Died: September 28, 1936 (aged 77); Boston, Massachusetts, U.S.
- Alma mater: United States Naval Academy (BS); Naval War College
- Military career
- Branch: United States Navy
- Service years: 1880–1922
- Rank: Admiral
- Commands: Naval War College; U.S. Naval Forces Operating in European Waters (WWI)
- Conflicts: Spanish American War; World War I
- Awards: Navy Distinguished Service Medal
- Other work: Pulitzer Prize for History (1921)

William Sowden Sims (October 15, 1858 – September 28, 1936) was an admiral in the United States Navy who fought during the late 19th and early 20th centuries to modernize the navy. During World War I, he commanded all United States naval forces operating in Europe. He also served twice as president of the Naval War College.

== Career ==
Sims was born to American father Alfred William (1826–1895) and Canadian mother Adelaide (née Sowden; b. 1835) living in Port Hope, Canada West. He graduated from the United States Naval Academy in 1880, the beginnings of an era of naval reform and greater professionalization. Commodore Stephen B. Luce founded the Naval War College in Newport, Rhode Island in 1884, to be the service's professional school. During the same era, Naval War College instructor Captain Alfred Thayer Mahan was writing influential books on naval strategy and sea power.

In March 1897, shortly after his promotion to lieutenant, Sims was assigned as the military attaché to Paris and St. Petersburg. In this position he became aware of naval technology developments in Europe as well gaining familiarity with European politics which would greatly assist him during World War I. He was in this assignment during the Spanish–American War during which Sims was able to use his diplomatic connections to gain information on Spain and its high-ranking officials.

=== Gunnery ===
As a young officer, Sims sought to improve naval gunnery. In the recently concluded war with Spain, American warships had fired 9,500 shells, of which only 121 found their mark. Sims sought to improve on this by employing a technique about which he had learned from Percy Scott of the British navy. The technique, continuous-aim firing, called for a gunner to adjust the gun's aim throughout the roll of the ship on which the gun is mounted, thereby keeping the gun constantly trained on the target throughout the roll, rather than keeping the gun in a fixed position and waiting for the roll to align the gun with the target. Scott had reportedly achieved a hit-rate of 80% using the new method. Sims advocated the same method for the U.S. Navy, but his superiors resisted his suggestions, partly because Sims was of low rank, and partly because of Sims's outspoken, rebellious attitude. In 1902, Sims wrote directly to President Theodore Roosevelt. The president, who had previously served as Assistant Secretary of the Navy, was intrigued by Sims's ideas and made him the Navy's Inspector of Naval Gunnery on November 5, 1902, shortly after which Sims was promoted to lieutenant commander. He was promoted to commander in 1907.

From 1911 to 1912, Sims attended the Naval War College. Promoted to captain in 1911, he became Commander, Atlantic Destroyer Flotilla in July 1913.

On March 11, 1916, Sims became the first captain of the battleship USS Nevada. Nevada was the largest, most modern and most powerful ship in the U.S. Navy at that time. His selection as her captain shows the esteem in which he was held in the Navy.

=== First World War ===
Shortly before the United States entered World War I, then Rear Admiral Sims was assigned as the president of the Naval War College in Newport, Rhode Island in February 1917. Just before the U.S. entered the war, the Wilson administration sent him to London as the senior naval representative. After the U.S. entry in April 1917, Sims was given command over U.S. naval forces operating from Britain. He received a temporary promotion (brevet) to vice admiral in May 1917.

The major threat he faced was a highly effective German submarine campaign against freighters bringing vital food and munitions to the Allies. The combined Anglo-American naval war against U-boats in the western approaches to the British Isles in 1917–18 was a success due to the ability of Sims to work smoothly with his British counterpart, Admiral Sir Lewis Bayly.

Sims believed the Navy Department in Washington, which was effectively headed by Assistant Secretary Franklin D. Roosevelt, was failing to provide him with sufficient authority, information, autonomy, manpower, and naval forces.

He ended the war as a vice admiral, in command of all U.S. naval forces operating in Europe. Shortly after the Armistice , Sims was promoted to temporary admiral in December 1918 but reverted to his permanent rank of rear admiral in April 1919 when he was assigned as president of the Naval War College.

=== Attack on Daniels ===
In 1919 after the war ended in Allied victory, Sims publicly attacked the deficiencies of American naval strategy, tactics, policy, and administration. He charged the failures had cost the Allies 2,500,000 tons of supplies, thereby prolonging the war by six months. He estimated the delay had raised the cost of the war to the Allies by $15 billion, and that it led to the unnecessary loss of 500,000 lives. Secretary of the Navy Josephus Daniels was more of a politician than a naval strategist, so he ably countered the accusations. He pointed to Sims's anglophilism, and said his vantage point in London was too narrow to assess accurately the overall war effort by the U.S. Navy. Daniels cited prewar naval preparations and strategy proposals made by other American leaders during the war to disprove Sims's charges.

Despite the public acrimony, Sims emerged with his reputation unharmed, although some historians believe it cost him promotion to the rank of Admiral of the Navy. He did however serve a second tour as president of the Naval War College (1919–1922). It was during his time at the Naval War College that he wrote and published his book The Victory at Sea which describes his experiences in World War I. In 1921 The Victory at Sea won the Pulitzer Prize for History. Sims is, possibly, the only career naval officer to win a Pulitzer Prize. (Rear Admiral Samuel E. Morison won two Pulitzer Prizes but only served nine years in the Naval Reserve.)

== Retirement and death ==
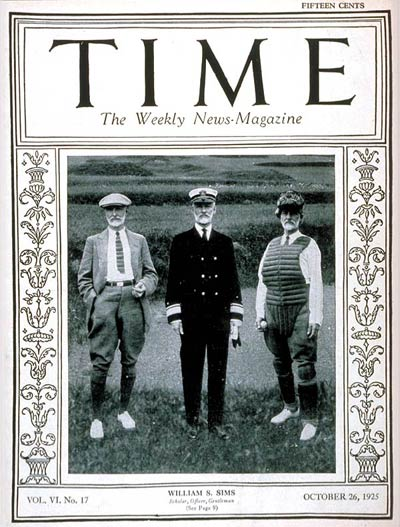
Time cover, 26 Oct 1925

Sims retired from the Navy in October 1922, having reached the mandatory retirement age of 64. In retirement he lived at 73 Catherine Street in Newport, Rhode Island. He appeared on the cover of the October 26, 1925 issue of Time magazine and was the subject of a feature article. He was promoted to full admiral on the retired list in 1930.

Admiral Sims died in Boston, Massachusetts, in 1936 at the age of 77. He is buried in Arlington National Cemetery.

== Personal life ==
Sims married Anne Erwin Hitchcock, who was sixteen years his junior, in 1905. The couple had five children, three daughters (Margaret, Adelaide and Anne) and two sons (William S. Sims, Jr. and Ethan Sims). Mrs. Sims died in 1960 at age 85.

== Awards ==
His account of the U.S. naval effort during World War I, The Victory at Sea, won the 1921 Pulitzer Prize for History. In 1929 was honored with a Doctor of Laws from Bates College.

Columbia University conferred the honorary degree of doctor of laws upon Rear Admiral Sims on 2 June 1920. Several weeks later, Williams College conferred on him the honorary degree of doctor of laws during its June 21, 1920, commencement exercises.

Four U.S. Navy vessels have been named for Sims. Two ships have been named USS Sims—the World War II-era destroyer USS Sims (DD-409) and destroyer escort USS Sims (DE-154). A transport vessel was named USS Admiral W. S. Sims. Additionally the Knox-class frigate USS W. S. Sims (FF-1059) was commissioned in 1970 and decommissioned in 1991.

The United States Postal Service issued a commemorative stamp panel on February 4, 2010. One of the stamps depicted Admiral Sims.

In 1947, the Naval War College acquired an existing barracks building, which they converted to a secondary war-gaming facility, naming it Sims Hall after its former president.

=== Honours and awards ===
United States military awards;

- Distinguished Service Medal (declined in a dispute with Secretary Daniels over awards)
- Spanish Campaign Medal
- Philippine Campaign Medal
- Mexican Service Medal
- Victory Medal

Foreign honors;

- Honorary Knight Grand Cross of the Order of St Michael and St George (United Kingdom) (1918)
- Grand Officer of the Legion of Honour (France) (1919)
- Grand Cordon in the Order of Leopold (Belgium)
- Grand Officer of the Order of the Crown of Italy

Other honors;

- Theodore Roosevelt Association Distinguished Service Medal (1926)
- American Legion Distinguished Service Medal (1930)
- Pulitzer Prize for History (1921)

== Dates of rank ==
- Cadet Midshipman, United States Naval Academy - 24 June 1876
- Midshipman - 22 June 1880
- Ensign (junior grade) - 3 March 1883
- Ensign - 26 June 1884
- Lieutenant (junior grade) - 9 May 1893
- Lieutenant - 1 January 1897
- Lieutenant Commander - 21 November 1902
- Commander - 1 July 1907
- Captain - 4 March 1911
- Rear Admiral - Selected on 29 August 1916, but remained number 31 of 30 flag officers remaining in the rank of captain while awaiting billet until 23 March 1917.
- Vice Admiral (temporary) - 25 May 1917
- Admiral (temporary) - 4 December 1918
- Rear Admiral - Upon returning to the Presidency of the Naval War College on 11 April 1919
- Rear Admiral, Retired List - 15 October 1922
- Admiral, Retired List - June 21, 1930

== See also ==
- List of people on the cover of Time magazine: 1920s

== Notes ==
Military offices
Preceded by Austin Melvin Knight	President of the Naval War College; 1917, 1919-1922	Succeeded by Clarence Stewart Williams
