= William C. Davis (historian) =

American historian (born 1946)

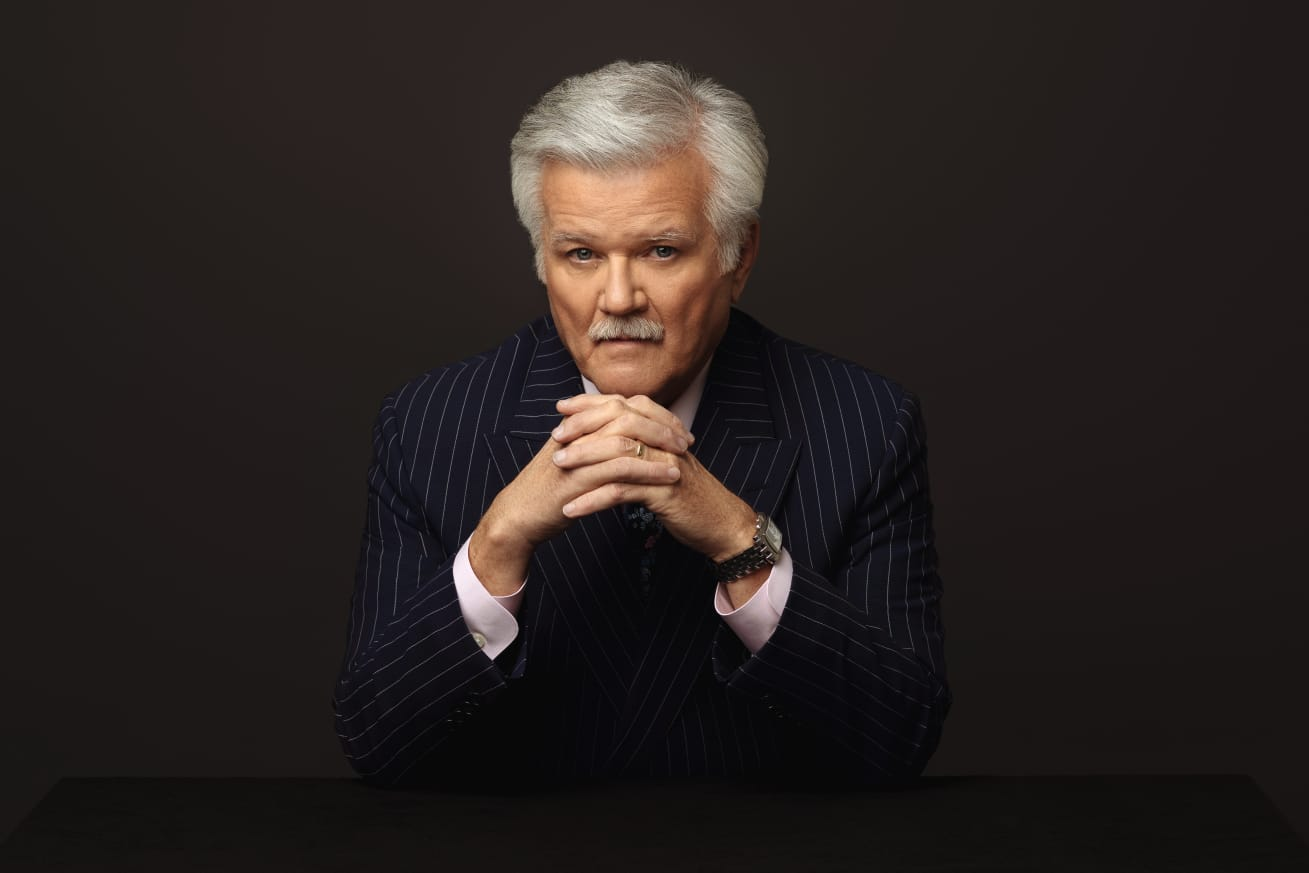
- Born: William Charles Davis; 1946 (age 79–80); Independence, Missouri, U.S.
- Other name: W.C. Davis
- Education: Sonoma State University (BA, MA)
- Occupation: Historian
- Known for: Studies of the American Civil War
- Notable work: The Cause Lost: Myths and Realities of the Confederacy (1996)
- Website: civilwar.vt.edu

William Charles "Jack" Davis (born 1946) is an American historian who was a professor of history at Virginia Tech and the former director of programs at that school's Virginia Center for Civil War Studies. Specializing in the American Civil War, Davis has written more than 40 books on that subject and other aspects of early southern U.S. history, such as the Texas Revolution. He is the only three-time winner of the Jefferson Davis Prize for Confederate history and was awarded the Jules and Frances Landry Award for Southern History. His book Lone Star Rising has been called "the best one-volume history of the Texas revolution yet written".

== Life and career ==
=== Early life and education ===
Davis earned Bachelor of Arts and Master of Arts (History, 1969) degrees from Sonoma State University. For many years, he was editor and publisher of Civil War Times Illustrated and lived in Mechanicsburg, Pennsylvania.

=== Career ===
Following his graduate studies, Davis began his professional career in publishing as an editorial assistant at Historical Times, Inc. in Harrisburg, Pennsylvania, from 1969 to 1972. He went on to serve as editor of American History Illustrated and Civil War Times Illustrated magazines from 1972 to 1976. He later became president of the National Historical Society (1976–1982), executive editor of Historical Times, Inc. (1982–1984), and corporate editorial director of the same company (1984–1986).

From 1986 to 1990, Davis was president of Museum Editions, Ltd., a book and product packaging division of Cowles Magazines, and continued as a book packaging and sales consultant from 1990 to 1992, including representing Salamander Books of London in the U.S. market.

In 1992, he began a long association as a consulting editor with Stackpole Books, a leading publisher of military history. That same year, he also served as an adjunct professor of English at Pennsylvania State University, Capitol Campus.

In 2000, Davis became a professor at Virginia Tech, where he served as director of programs for the Virginia Center for Civil War Studies. He retired from this position in 2013.

Throughout his academic and professional career, Davis has lectured across the United States, including the University of Arkansas, Tulane University, Virginia Military Institute, and Washington and Lee University. He has presented papers before prominent scholarly associations such as the American Historical Association, the Southern Historical Association, and the Smithsonian Institution.

He was chief consultant and on-screen historian for the Arts and Entertainment/History Channel series “Civil War Journal,” and has served as historical advisor for numerous television and film productions here and in the UK. He has also served as a voluntary consultant to the Virginia State Police linvestigating “cold case” homicides.

Davis served as a consultant for the creation of a United States postage stamp of Jefferson Davis and has had input into the formation of the Museum of the Civil War in Petersburg, Virginia.
Davis was awarded the Sonoma State University Distinguished Alumni Award in 1993. In 2015, he received The Lincoln Forum's Richard Nelson Current Award of Achievement.

== Scholarly works ==
In 1996, Davis authored the book The Cause Lost: Myths and Realities of the Confederacy, a critical examination of mythical claims made by neo-Confederates and Lost Cause members regarding the Confederacy and the American Civil War. Davis states that "it is impossible to point to any other local issue but slavery and say that Southerners would have seceded and fought over it." However, Davis contrasted the motivations of the Confederate leadership with that of the motivations for individual men for fighting in the Confederate army, writing that "The widespread northern myth that the Confederates went to the battlefield to perpetuate slavery is just that, a myth. Their letters and diaries, in the tens of thousands, reveal again and again that they fought and died because their Southern homeland was invaded and their natural instinct was to protect home and hearth."

Over the course of his career, William C. Davis has authored or edited more than fifty books, many of which have become standard works in the field of Civil War studies. Among his most acclaimed publications are Jefferson Davis: The Man and His Hour, widely regarded as the definitive biography of the Confederate president, and A Government of Our Own: The Making of the Confederacy.

In 2015, Davis published Crucible of Command: Ulysses S. Grant and Robert E. Lee – The War They Fought, The Peace They Forged, a comparative biography examining the military careers, personal lives, ethical perspectives, and political views of both generals. The work received the Jefferson Davis Award from the American Civil War Museum, the John Y. Simon Award from the Ulysses S. Grant Association, and the Richard Nelson Current Award of Achievement from the Lincoln Forum.

Davis has served as an editor, conference speaker, and lecturer at academic institutions, with presentations before organizations including the American Historical Association, the Southern Historical Association, and the Smithsonian Institution. His scholarship extends beyond the Civil War to subjects such as 19th-century political culture, historical memory, and biography. He has also written on piracy in The Pirates Laffite and on the early Republic in Lone Star Rising.

In his later research, Davis turned to lesser-known figures, including Loreta Janeta Velazquez, an alleged Confederate soldier and spy whose memoir he exposed as largely fictional in a recent biographical study. He is currently editing a collection of Civil War-era letters between Confederate general Gabriel Wharton and his wife, Nannie Wharton.

== Works ==
=== Original works ===
- Breckinridge: Statesman, Soldier, Symbol (1974)
- Duel Between the First Ironclads: The Famous Civil War Battle at Sea Between the Union Ironclad Monitor and the Confederacy's Virginia, the Redesigned and Rebuilt U.S.S. Merrimack (1975; 2nd ed. 1994)
- The Battle of New Market (1975, 2nd ed. 1993)
- Battle at Bull Run: A History of the First Major Campaign of the Civil War (1977, 2nd ed. 1995)
- The Orphan Brigade: The Kentucky Confederates Who Couldn’t Go Home (1980; 2nd ed. 1993)
- The Imperiled Union, 1861-1865 (2 volumes)
  - Deep Waters of the Proud (1982)
  - Stand in the Day of Battle (1983)
- Brother Against Brother - The War Begins (1983), Time-Life Series: The Civil War
- First Blood: Fort Sumter to Bull Run (1983), Time-Life Series: The Civil War
- Death in the Trenches: Grant at Petersburg (1986), Time-Life Series: The Civil War
- Rebels & Yankees: The Battlefields of the Civil War (19??) with Russ A. Pritchard
- Rebels & Yankees: The Fighting Men of the Civil War (1989) with Russ A. Pritchard
- Rebels & Yankees: The Commanders of the Civil War (1990) with Russ A. Pritchard
- Jefferson Davis: The Man and His Hour (1991)
- 'A Government of Our Own': The Making of the Confederacy (1994)
- The American Frontier: Pioneers, Settlers, and Cowboys 1800-1899 (1995)
- A Way Through the Wilderness: The Natchez Trace and the Civilization of the Southern Frontier (1995)
- The Cause Lost: Myths and Realities of the Confederacy (1996)
- Three Roads to the Alamo: The Lives and Fortunes of David Crockett, James Bowie, and William Barret Travis (1998)
- Lincoln's Men: How President Lincoln Became Father to an Army and a Nation (1999)
- The Union That Shaped the Confederacy: Robert Toombs and Alexander H. Stephens (2001)
- Portraits of the Riverboats (2001)
- An Honorable Defeat: The Last Days of the Confederate Government (2001)
- The Civil War Reenactors' Encyclopedia (2002)
- Look Away! A History of the Confederate States of America (2003)
- A Taste For War: The Culinary History of the Blue and the Gray (2003)
- Lone Star Rising: The Revolutionary Birth of the Texas Republic (2004)
- The Pirates Laffite: The Treacherous World of the Corsairs of the Gulf (2005)
- The Rogue Republic: How Would-Be Patriots Waged the Shortest Revolution in American History (2011)
- Crucible of Command: Ulysses S. Grant and Robert E. Lee—The War They Fought, the Peace They Forged (2015)
- The Greatest Fury: The Battle of New Orleans and the Rebirth of America (2019)
- "Gabriel and Nannie Wharton", in Final Resting Places: Reflections on the Meaning of Civil War Graves, edited by Brian Matthew Jordan and Jonathan W. White (2023)

=== Editor or co-editor ===
- The Image of War: 1861-1865; National Historical Society: Doubleday & Company, Inc.
  - Volume I: Shadows of the Storm (1981)
  - Volume II: The Guns of '62 (1982)
  - Volume III: The Embattled Confederacy (1982)
  - Volume IV: Fighting for Time (1983)
  - Volume V: The South Besieged (1983)
  - Volume VI: The End of an Era (1984)
- Touched by Fire: A National Historical Society Photographic Portrait of the Civil War (1985; 2 volumes)
- Diary of a Confederate Soldier: John S. Jackman of the Orphan Brigade (1990)
- Civil War Journal: The Battles (1998) with Brian C. Pohanka and Don Troiani
- Civil War Journal: The Legacies (1999) with Brian C. Pohanka and Don Troiani
- A Fire-Eater Remembers: The Confederate Memoir of Robert Barnwell Rhett (2000)
- Civil War Journal: The Leaders (2003) with Brian C. Pohanka and Don Troiani
- Faith in the Fight: Civil War Chaplains (2003) with John W. Brinsfield and Benedict Maryniak
- Virginia at War, 1861 (2005) with James I. Robertson, Jr.
- Virginia at War, 1862 (2008) with James I. Robertson, Jr.
- Virginia at War, 1863 (2008) with James I. Robertson, Jr.
- Virginia at War, 1864 (2009) with James I. Robertson, Jr.
- Virginia at War, 1865 (2011) with James I. Robertson, Jr.
- The Whartons' War: The Civil War Correspondence of General Gabriel C. Wharton & Anne Radford Wharton, 1863-1865 (2022) with Sue Heth Bell

=== Foreword ===
- Troiani, Don and Brian Pohanka (1999), Don Troiani's Civil War
- Meade, Robert Douthat (2001), Judah P. Benjamin: Confederate Statesman
- Lowry, Thomas P. (1998), Tarnished Eagles
- Kunstler, Mort (2007), The Civil War Paintings of Mort Kunstler, Volume 3: The Gettysburg Campaign
- Lowry, Thomas P. (2003), Curmudgeons, Drunkards, and Outright Fools: The Courts-Martial of Civil War Union Colonels
- McCoy, Sharolyn S (2013), Big Mountain to Washburn Prairie, The Sugar Creek Hills of Southwest M
