= Jefferson Davis: The Man and His Hour =

1991 book by William C. Davis

Jefferson Davis: The Man and His Hour is a 1991 book by William C. Davis, published by HarperCollins Publishers. It is a biography of Jefferson Davis.

The author is not a relative of Jefferson Davis.

== Background ==
William C. Davis wrote at least 25 books about the Southern United States and the U.S. Civil War.

The author used Rice University's "Papers of Jefferson Davis" collection for research.

== Contents ==
There are 706 pages.

According to Herman Hattaway of University of Missouri–Kansas City, Civil War coverage and coverage of pre-Civil War affairs make up around 48% and 42% of the book, and the time Davis was imprisoned is covered in 19 pages. John M. McCardell, Jr. of Middlebury College stated that the Civil War coverage is around 50% of the work. Gary Marotta of University of Southwest Louisiana stated that the pre-1861 content is almost 33%, and that the post-Civil War content is the "slimist" [sic] (meaning "slimmest") aspect. According to Hattaway, the conclusion is expressed in 18 pages.

Marotta stated that the author "sees through the Jefferson Davis myth", arguing that the author did not examine the reasons why Davis did his actions even though he presented superficial aspects of it.

According to the book, Jefferson Davis micromanaged, overall had poor overall actions as president, and as stated by Marotta, had a "character and personality" incompatible with his job.

== Reception ==
David Herbert Donald, in The New York Times, described the book as "richly textured", "a standard, authoritative account of" the subject's life, and "the fullest and best biography yet written".

Hattaway described the book as "the best extant biography of" Davis. Hattaway characterized the book as being imbalanced, with the amount of coverage of content other than the Civil War period and Davis' life prior to the Civil War as "disappointingly scant".

Marotta praised the "factual verification and reassessment" and characterized the book as being "thoroughly researched" and "heavily annotated". Marotta argued that the author should have focused on "uncovering meaning and significance" as opposed to "events of history".

McCardell described the book as a "fine biography".

Kirkus Reviews stated that the book is "dispassionate, well-researched, and skillful".

Publishers Weekly stated that the work is "pragmatic but sympathetic".

== See also ==
- Bibliography of Jefferson Davis
