= Statesmen of the Lost Cause =

American Civil War book

Statesmen of the Lost Cause: Jefferson Davis and His Cabinet is a 1939 non-fiction book by Burton Jesse Hendrick, published by Little, Brown and Company.

The thesis of the work is that the inability to acquire and develop competent politicians, as well as an inability to form a proper federal government due to too much emphasis on states' rights, caused the collapse of the Confederate States of America. Herschel Brickell, in The Atlantic, wrote that this gave the title irony. The author also wrote about conflict within the Cabinet of the Confederate States of America.

== Content ==
The author stated that the Confederate politicians were unable to gauge how politicians in France and the United Kingdom felt about the American Civil War.

There are 26 photographs. There are portraits made in pen.

The work has an index and a bibliography.

== Reception ==
Brickell wrote that the work is "exceptionally interesting", as well as "long" and "detailed".

A. J. Hanna of Rollins College wrote that the work overall "is a distinguished contribution", and that the "vivid treatment of" the international relations of the CSA, as well as the portraits, which Hanna described as "superb", are the "principal value of" the work. Hanna stated that there were some "defects and a number of minor errors".

Charles W. Ramsdell of the University of Texas at Austin stated that the work "is vivid, vigorous, and enjoyable", and argued that "vivid portraits of Confederate leaders and foreign diplomats" are the "best" aspect of the work. He also had a positive reception to the photography and the index, while he argued the bibliography was "fair".

Rupert B. Vance of the University of North Carolina described the book as a "brilliant contribution", and gave praise to the portraits, stating they had "vivid, incisive strokes."
