= Emory M. Thomas =

American historian

Emory Thomas (born November 3, 1939, in Richmond, Virginia) is a history professor emeritus at the University of Georgia and noted scholar of the American Civil War. He earned a Ph.D. from Rice University in 1966.

== Selected works ==
External videos
- Booknotes interview with Thomas on Robert E. Lee: A Biography, September 10, 1995, C-SPAN

- The Confederacy as a Revolutionary Experience (1970)
- Confederate State of Richmond: A Biography of the Capital (1971)
- The American War and Peace, 1860-1877 (1973)
- The Confederate Nation, 1861-1865 (1979)
- Bold Dragoon: The Life of J.E.B. Stuart (1986)
- Travels to Hallowed Ground: A Historian's Journey to the American Civil War (1987)
- Robert E. Lee: A Biography (1995)
- Robert E. Lee: An Album (2000)
