= Charles Banks (businessman) =

American bank founder, businessman (1873–1923)

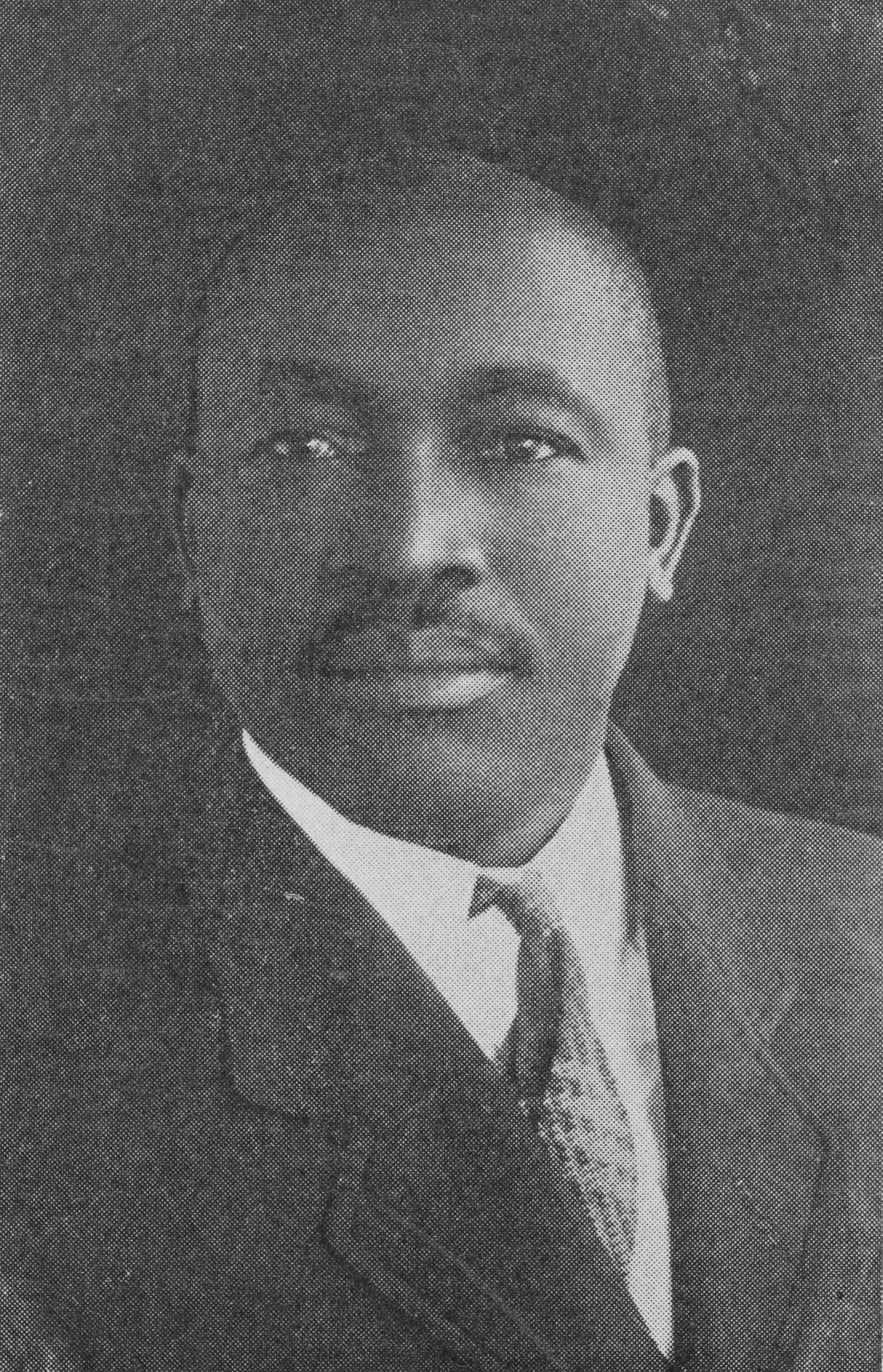
- Born: March 25, 1873; Clarksdale, Mississippi, U.S.
- Died: October 18, 1923 (aged 50); Memphis, Tennessee, U.S.
- Burial place: Clarksdale, Mississippi, U.S.
- Other name: "Wizard of Mound Bayou"
- Education: Rust University
- Occupations: Bank founder, businessman
- Political party: Black and tan Republican
- Spouse: Trenna Ophelia Booze (m. 1893–1923; his death)
- Relatives: Eugene P. Booze (brother in-law)

Charles Banks (March 25, 1873 – October 18, 1923) was an American bank founder and businessman. He founded the Bank of Mound Bayou, and the Mound Bayou Oil Mill and Manufacturing Company in Mound Bayou, Mississippi. Banks was a member of the executive committee of Booker T. Washington's National Negro Business League. He was nicknamed the “Wizard of Mound Bayou”.

== Early life and education ==
Charles Banks was born on March 25, 1873, in Clarksdale, Mississippi, to parents Sallie Ann and Daniel A. Banks. His father had previously been enslaved, and worked as a farmer. Charles was born on the property of Eliza and John Clark, a prominent white family and his namesake. His early education was at Coahoma County school.

Banks attended from 1887 to 1890, Rust University (now Rust College) in Holly Springs, Mississippi, and left without graduation.

In 1893, Banks married Trenna Ophelia Booze, a school teacher and the older sister of Eugene Parker Booze.

== Early career Clarksdale, Mississippi ==
While Banks attended college, Banks and Eugene Parker Booze opened a Clarksdale mercantile business called Banks and Bro. In 1900, Banks attend the first meeting of the National Negro Business League in Boston, and met the organization's founder Booker T. Washington.

== Career in Mound Bayou, Mississippi ==
=== Financial industry career ===
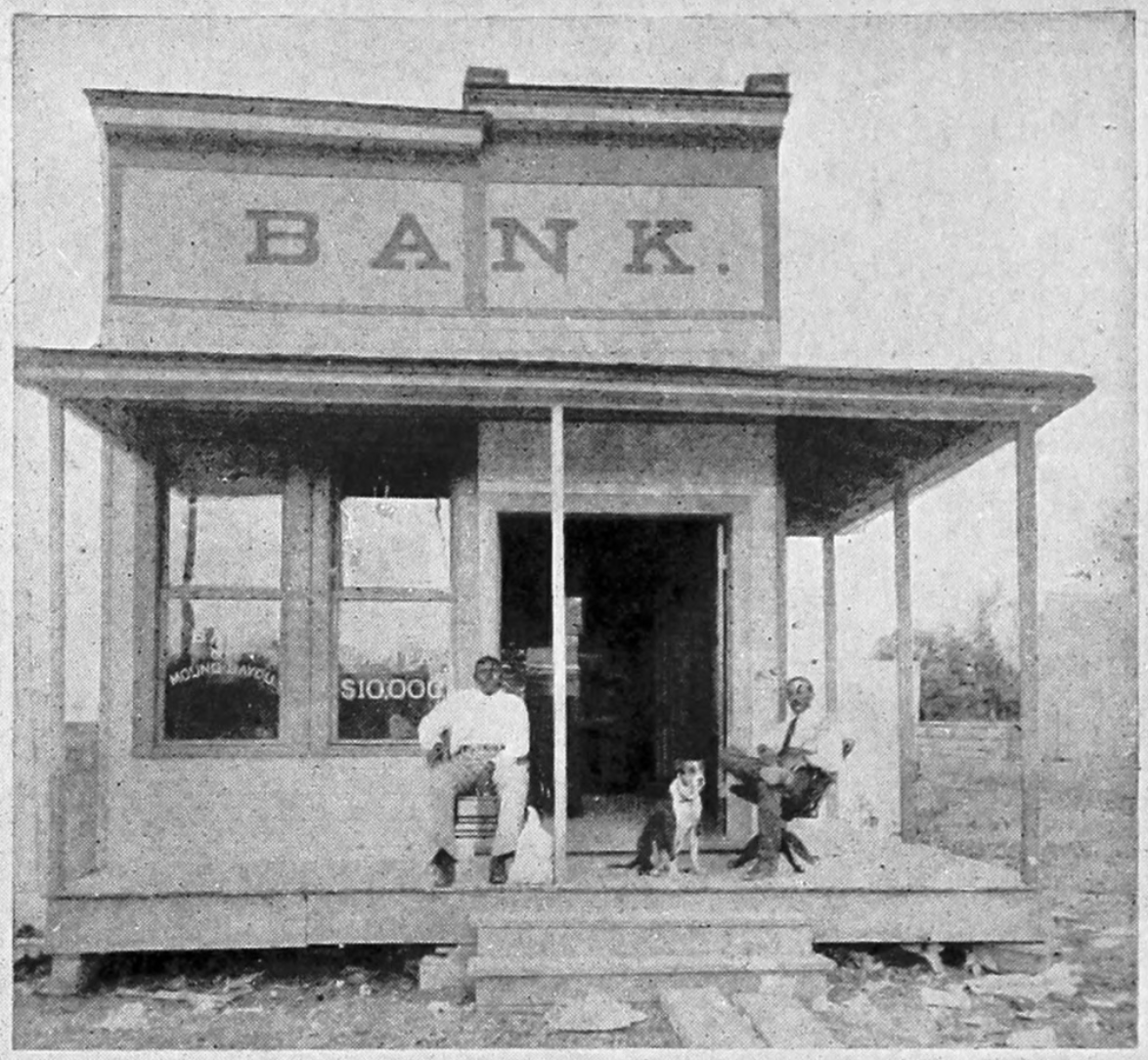
Bank of Mound Bayou, c. 1907

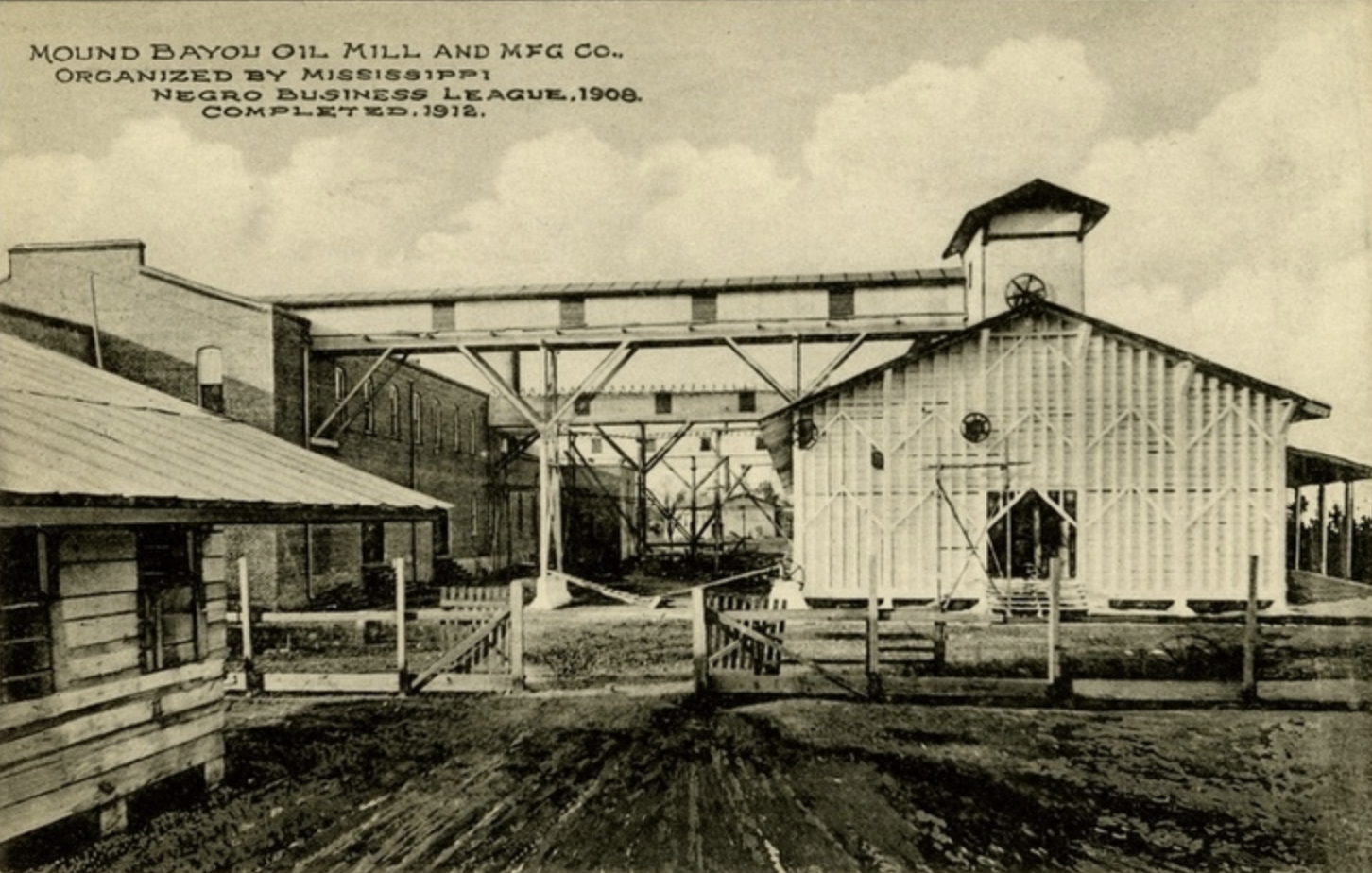
Mound Bayou Oil Mill and Manufacturing Company, c. 1918

Around 1903, Clark and Booze closed their mercantile and both moved to Mound Bayou, Mississippi, a community founded by Isaiah T. Montgomery. Montgomery was also a member of the National Negro Business League, and was Booze's father in-law. Mound Bayou is located in the Delta of Mississippi and was all-Black community established by African Americans, many of whom had been enslaved.

Booze and Banks founded the Bank of Mound Bayou in 1904, one of the first Black owned banks in the state. Banks held roughly two-thirds the stock, and served as the cashier and head of operations of the bank. In 1907, Booker T. Washington wrote an article in The World’s Work where he praised the Bank of Mound Bayou, and Charles Banks. In 1914, the Bank of Mound Bayou failed due to a recession. The former building is listed by the National Register of Historic Places, and is included in the Mound Bayou Historic District.

In June 1915, they reorganized and opened a new bank called the Mound Bayou State Bank, which remained open for about a decade.

Mound Bayou Loan and Investment Company was founded by Banks and William Thornton Montgomery, in order to maintain local land and farms within the African American community, and in turn prevented the intrusion of white ownership.

=== Other businesses ===
Banks served as 3rd vice president of the National Negro Business League from 1901 to 1905, and as 1st vice president from 1907. He was an active member of the African Methodist Episcopal Church; as well as the Knights of Pythias, Odd Fellows, National Negro Bankers Association, and the Negro Bankers Association of Mississippi.

In 1909, Banks and Eugene P. Booze founded the Farmer’s Cooperative Mercantile Company in Mound Bayou, a store to sell affordable items to farmers. The mercantile was managed by Booze, until its closure in 1922.

Banks with the Mississippi State Negro Business League, an auxiliary branch of the National Negro Business League, in 1907 founded the Mound Bayou Oil Mill and Manufacturing Company, a cottonseed oil mill operation was the goal of helping African Americans be economically independent. They started selling shares of the company in 1908, and in 1912 the building plant was completed. Julius Rosenwald, the head of Sears, Roebuck & Company, heavily invested in the company. During the 1913–1914 recession the company was struggling and brought in Benjamin B. Harvey, a white mill owner from Memphis, who ended up embezzling money. The oil mill closed, and the new plant remained empty for decades. It reopened during World War I, during a brief period when cotton prices were high. A historical marker is erected at the site in 2013 by Historic Mound Bayou Foundation and the AARP.

== Late life and death ==
In 1917, Isaiah T. Montgomery and Banks had a political dispute and ended their partnership; resulting in Montgomery no longer supported broader town ventures. Banks continued his efforts to improve the Mound Bayou economy, and lost his fortunes in the early 1920s.

Banks died from food poisoning on October 18, 1923, in Memphis, Tennessee, and was interned in Claksdale, Mississippi.

Banks was the subject of the David H. Jackson Jr.'s book, A Chief Lieutenant of the Tuskegee Machine: Charles Banks of Mississippi (2002).
