= Bank of Mound Bayou =

Historic building in Mississippi, US

- Mound Bayou Bank
- U.S. National Register of Historic Places
- Mississippi Landmark
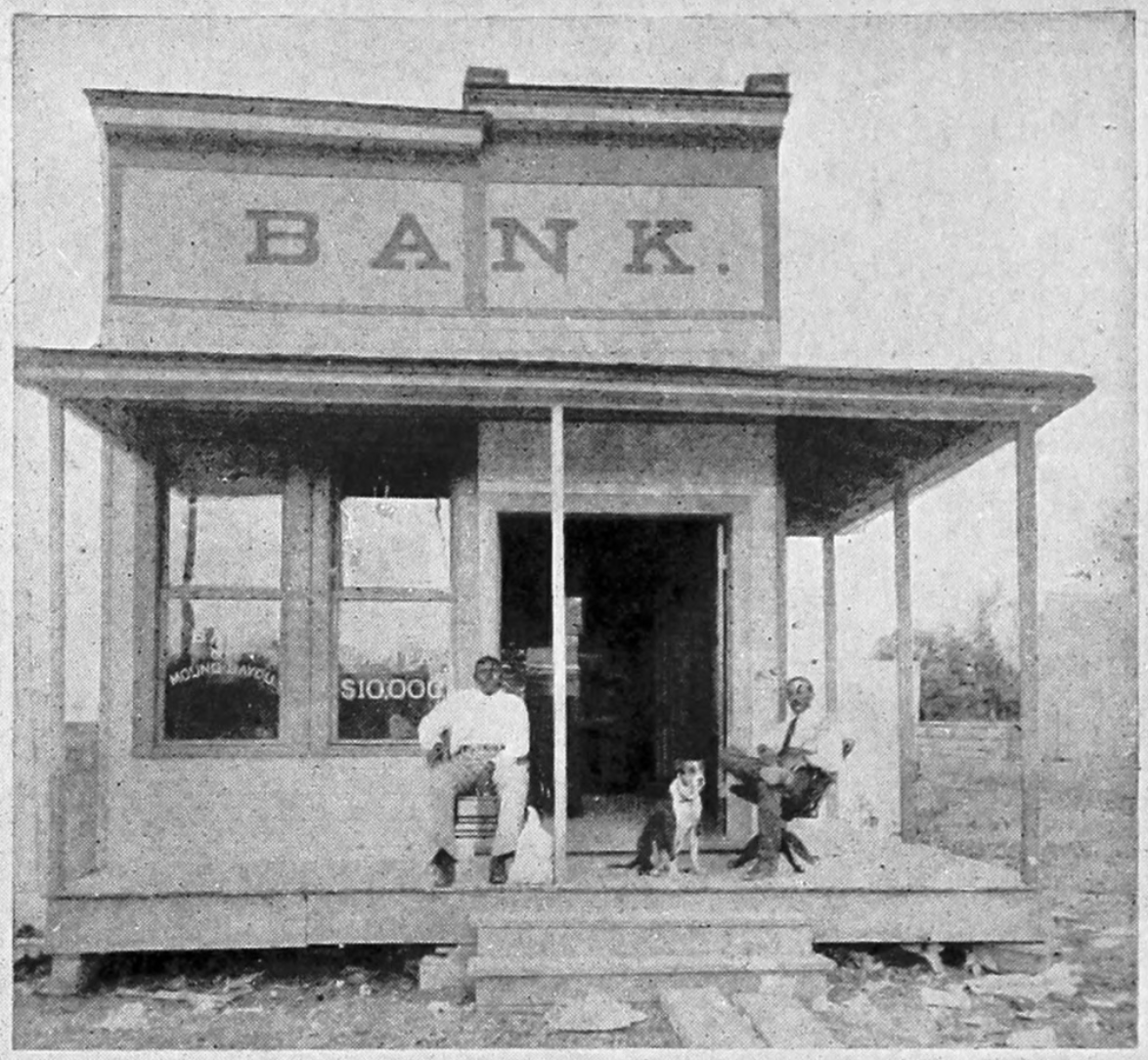
- c. 1907

- Location within Mississippi
- Location: W. Main Street, Mound Bayou, Mississippi, U.S.
- Coordinates: 33°52′32″N 90°43′43″W
- Area: less than one acre
- Built: 1904
- NRHP reference No.: 96000187
- USMS No.: V. M212

Significant dates
- Added to NRHP: March 1, 1996
- Designated USMS: November 1, 1995

Bank of Mound Bayou, also known as Mound Bayou Bank, was a financial institution and is a historic building in Mound Bayou, Mississippi, United States. It was founded in 1904 by African American businessmen Charles Banks and Eugene Parker Booze, and was one of the first Black-owned banks in the state. It remained active until 1914.

The former building is a contributing property of the Mound Bayou Historic District since September 11, 2013, is listed on the National Register of Historic Places since March 1, 1996, under the name "Mound Bayou Bank"; and is listed as a Mississippi Landmark since November 1, 1995.

== History ==
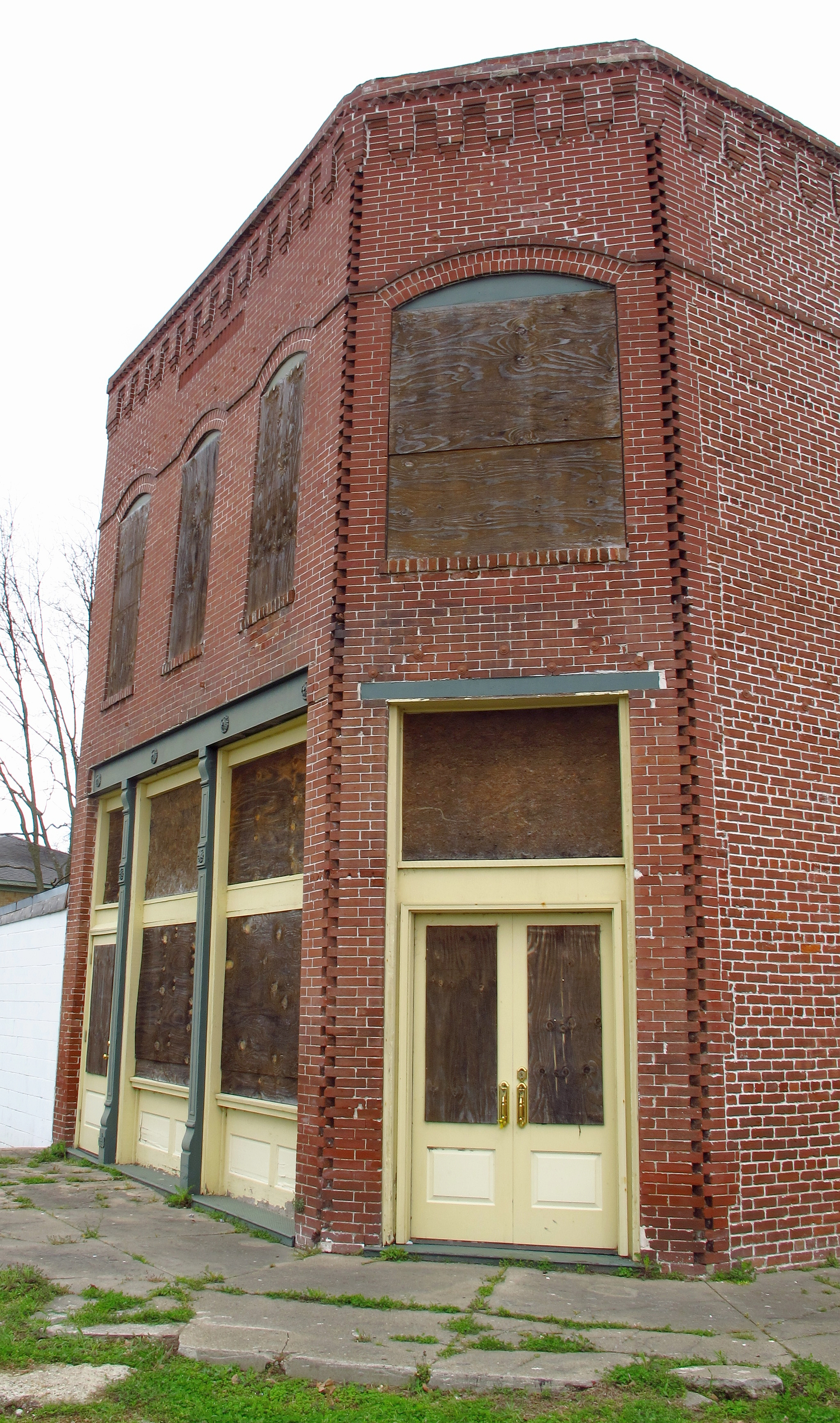
Former Bank of Mound Bayou building, 2014

The town of Mound Bayou was founded on the Delta of Mississippi as an independent all-Black community in 1887, led by Isaiah T. Montgomery. Many of the early residents had been enslaved prior to the end of the American Civil War in 1865.

Banks had attended the 1901 first meeting of the National Negro Business League in Boston, where he met Isaiah T. Montgomery; and Eugene P. Booze had recently married to one of Montgomery's daughters. Around 1903, businessmen Charles Banks and Eugene Parker Booze decided to move from Clarksdale, Mississippi to Mound Bayou.

Booze and Banks founded the Bank of Mound Bayou in 1904. Banks held roughly two-thirds the stock, and served as the cashier and head of operations of the bank. Booker T. Washington wrote an article in 1907 in The World’s Work magazine, where he praised the Bank of Mound Bayou.

The bank closed due to a recession and after a decline in cotton prices in 1914. In June 1915, they reorganized and opened a new bank called the Mound Bayou State Bank, which remained open for about a decade.

Over the years, the facade of the building has changes, but the layout has remained the same. The Mound Bayou Bank building is the only commercial building remaining in the town which links to the prosperity the thriving community experienced in the early years of the 20th century.

== See also ==
- National Register of Historic Places listings in Bolivar County, Mississippi
- Mound Bayou Historic District
