= Eugene P. Booze =

American businessman (1879–1939)

Eugene Parker Booze
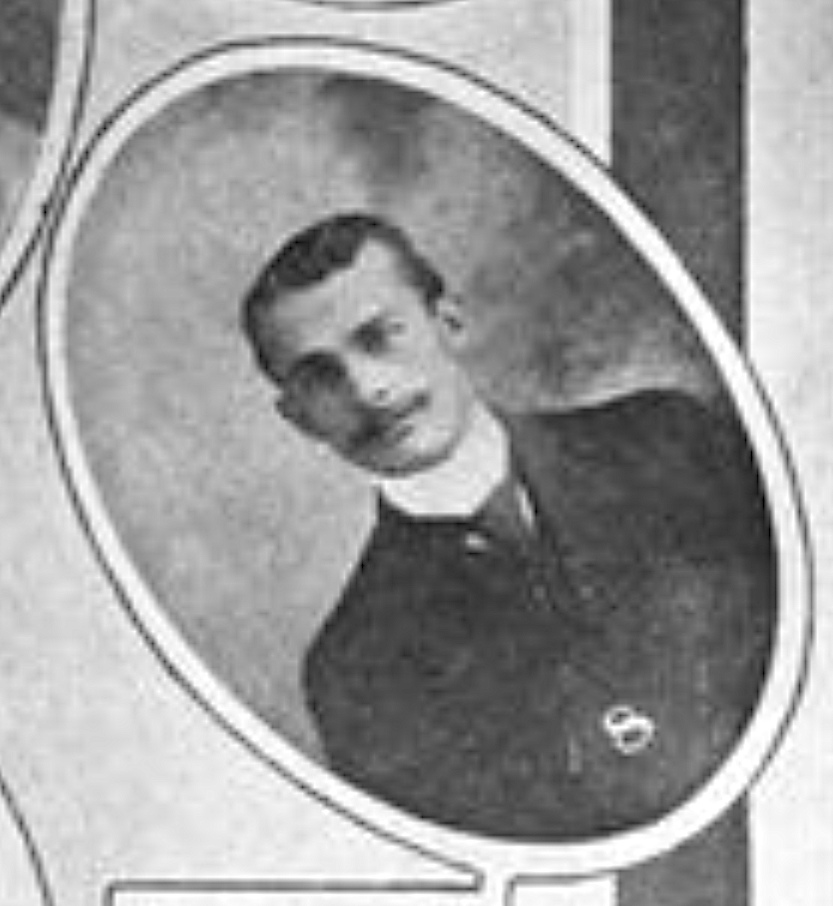
- Born: July 14, 1878; Adams County, Mississippi, U.S.
- Died: November 7, 1939 (aged 61); Greenville, Bolivar County, Mississippi, U.S.
- Education: Natchez Junior College
- Occupations: Businessman, planter, political organizer, Black community leader
- Political party: Republican
- Spouse: Mary Cordelia Montgomery (m. 1901–1939; his death)
- Children: 2
- Relatives: Isaiah Montgomery (father in-law); Charles Banks (brother in-law)

Eugene Parker Booze (July 14, 1878 – November 7, 1939) was an American businessman, planter, political organizer, and Black community leader from Clarksdale, Mississippi and later Mound Bayou, Mississippi. He was one of the wealthiest African American men in Mississippi at the time of his death. Booze was entangled in family drama during the last few years of his life which ended with his homicide. His former home, the Booze House (c. 1910), is part of the Mound Bayou Historic District. He also used the names E. P. Booze and Eugene Booze.

== Early life and family ==
Eugene Parker Booze was born on July 14, 1878, in Adams County, Mississippi. He was described as being light skinned, and being able to pass as White. His older sister Trenma Ophelia Booze was married in 1893, to Charles Banks (1873–1923). Booze attended Natchez Junior College, and apprenticed in merchandising and cotton trading.

He married Mary Cordelia Montgomery (later known as Mary Booze) in 1901, the daughter of the founder of Mound Bayou, Isaiah Thornton Montgomery. Together they had two children.

== Career ==
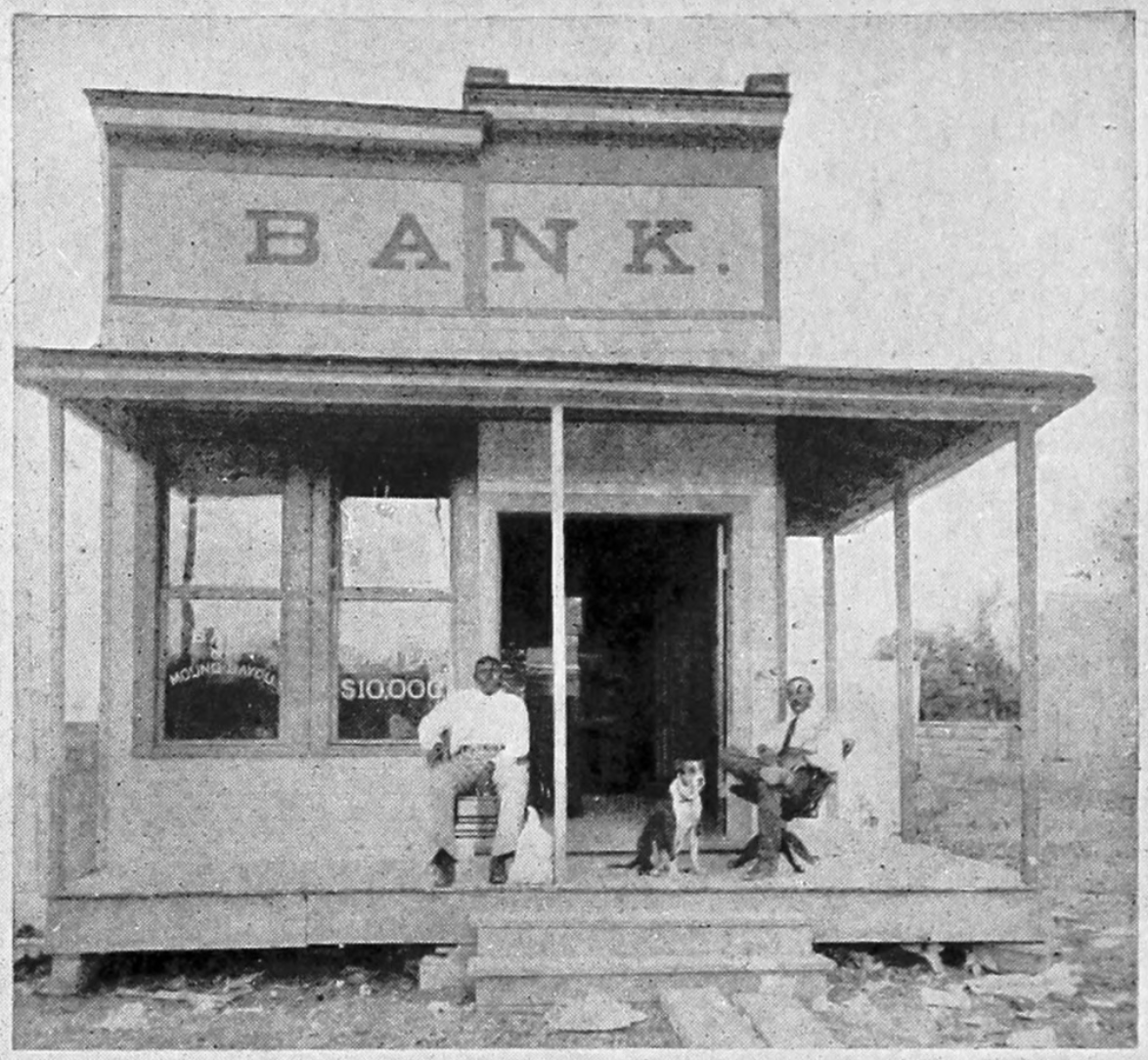
Bank of Mound Bayou, c. 1907

Booze was on the executive committee of the National Negro Business League in 1907, and 1910, representing Colorado Springs, Colorado.

Booze and his brother in-law Charles Banks opened a mercantile business called Banks and Bro. in Clarksdale, Mississippi.

Around 1903, Clark and Booze closed their mercantile and both moved to Mound Bayou, Mississippi. Booze and Banks founded in 1904 the Bank of Mound Bayou, one of the first Black owned banks in the state.

In 1909, Booze co-founded alongside Charles Banks the Farmer's Cooperative Mercantile Company in Mound Bayou, a store to sell affordable items to farmers. The store remained open until 1922.

Booze was a delegate at the 1924 Republican National Convention for the third district of Mound Bayou. His wife, Mary Booze, served on the Republican National Committee, and was the first African American woman to do so.

Booze owned extensive cotton lands, and was described at Mound Bayou's wealthiest citizen at the time of his death. The Booze House (c. 1910), 308 West Main South, is part of the Mound Bayou Historic District.

== Later years and estate issues ==
There was a Montgomery family feud over Isaiah Thornton Montgomery's estate after his death in 1924, Booze was the estate administrator. Some of the Montgomery daughters charged that they were not given fair shares of the estate, and one of them Estella Montgomery unsuccessfully mounted a legal challenge.

In 1927, Estella Montgomery charged that Booze and his wife Mary, and Mayor Benjamin A. Green, had participated in a plot to poison Isaiah Thornton Montgomery. The case never went to trial because of a lack of evidence.

Many citizens of Mound Bayou resented Booze for perceived subservience to the white Delta elite though he also brought some needed philanthropic improvements. He ran repeatedly for mayor but always lost. In his capacity as a Mississippi "Black and Tan" Republican notable, Booze maintained an active correspondence and cooperation with the NAACP and quietly pushed the national party to promote a more pro civil-rights stance.

In October 1939, his sister-in-law Estella Montgomery attempted to enter Eugene's house in Mound Bayou (which was formerly her own father's house), this was her second attempt to enter, and she had been banned from entering by court order. Eugene called the police and she resisted arrest, brandishing butcher knives. Estella was shot four times and killed by two deputies, in what newspapers described as possible "foul play".

Many citizens of Mound Bayou, including Mayor Benjamin A. Green, blamed Booze for his treatment of his sister-in-law, and demanded that he leave the community. A few weeks later Booze was ambushed and shot multiple times on November 6, 1939, in Mound Bayou. He died the next day in the hospital in Greenville, Mississippi.

== See also ==
- National Register of Historic Places listings in Bolivar County, Mississippi
