= Minnie L. Fisher =

American civic worker and community activist

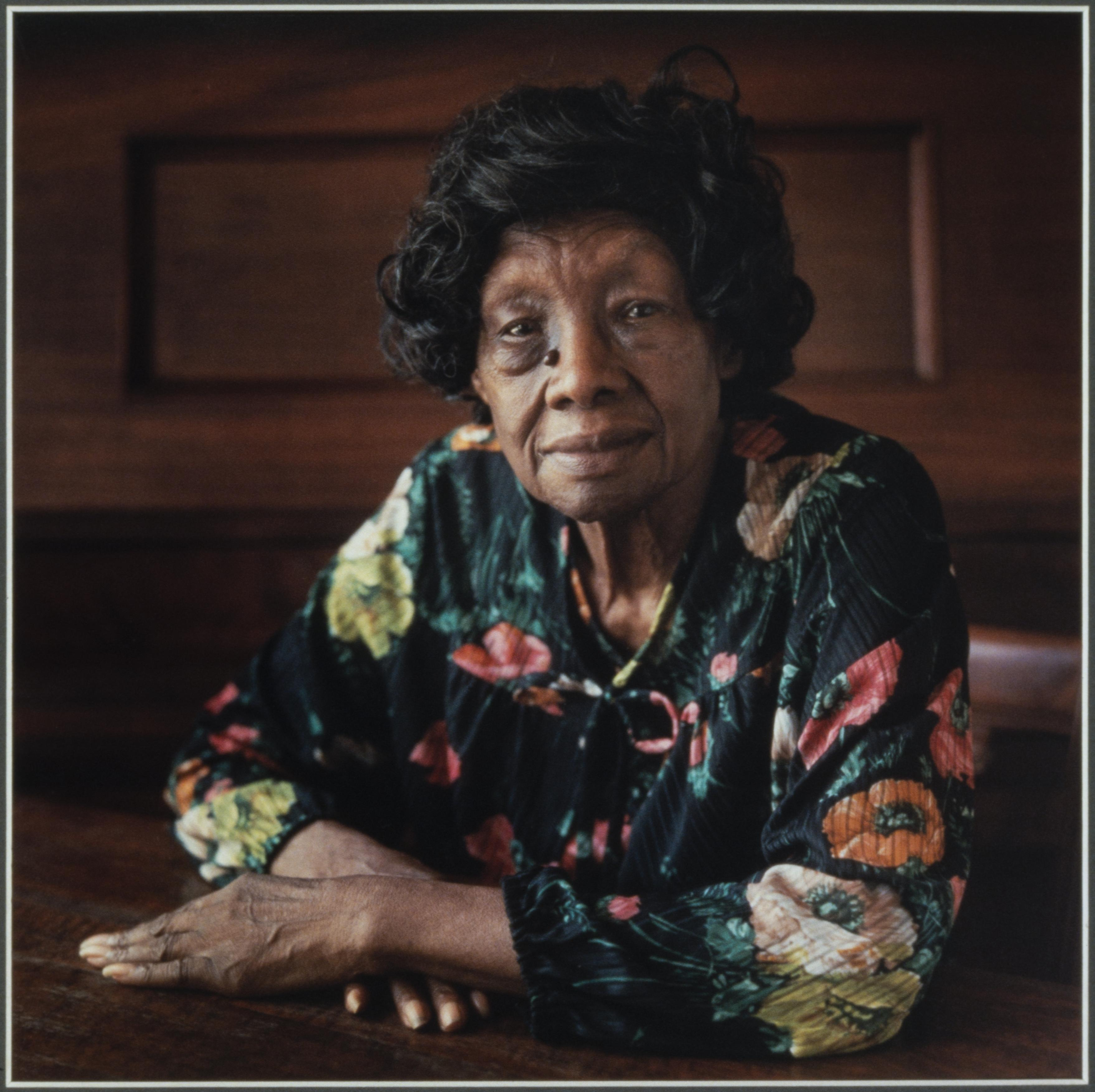
- Born: April 29, 1896; Mound Bayou, Mississippi
- Occupation(s): City Librarian; Town Clerk; Tax Collector; Election Commissioner
- Known for: Minnie Fisher Day (21 April 1979)

Minnie Lucinda Fisher (1896-1990) was a civic worker and community activist. She was a native-born citizen of the town of Mound Bayou, Mississippi, an all-Black town founded by Isaiah Montgomery in 1887.

== Biography ==
Minnie Fisher was born in 1896 to parents Warren and Mary Elizabeth Fisher of Vicksburg, Mississippi, who were among first group of settlers in Mound Bayou. Fisher went to Tougaloo College.

In Mound Bayou, Fisher has worked as the city librarian, the town clerk, a tax collector, and was on the election commission for the city. As city librarian, she put a focus on acquiring Black books. In a New York Times article, she said, "We have put in quite a number of black books in the last year or two. Our people are reading more black books now and the schools had to put in a whole department. . . .". She was a member of the Mound Bayou Civic Improvement Society. She briefly served as the editor of the Mound Bayou News. She was a life-long member of the International Order of Twelve Knights and Daughters of Tabor, an African American fraternal organization.

As an election commissioner, Fisher was involved in the appellate case of Fisher v. Crowe.

On April 21, 1979, Mound Bayou celebrated Fisher with Minnie Fisher Day.
