= Mound Bayou Historic District =

- U.S. National Register of Historic Places
- Location within Mississippi
- Location: Roughly bounded by Martin Luther King Ave., Mound Bayou Cemetery, South & Davis Sts., Mound Bayou, Bolivar County, Mississippi, U.S.
- Built: 1898
- Architectural style: Late 19th and 20th Century Revivals, Late 19th And Early 20th Century American Movements
- NRHP reference No.: 13000735
- Added to NRHP: September 11, 2013

Mound Bayou Historic District is a historic district located in the city of Mound Bayou in Bolivar County, Mississippi, U.S.. The area was founded by, developed and governed by African Americans in its early years, and is primarily residential with a small strip of commercial structures running for two blocks along Edwards Avenue. It is listed on the National Register of Historic Places on September 11, 2013, for architecture.

== History ==
The Mound Bayou Historic District contains 34 contributing properties, 17 noncontributing, and 3 already listed on the NRHP. Almost all of the surviving buildings in this district are vernacular in style.

The roughly eleven block district is flat. There are few formal records regarding Mound Bayou, including no Sanborn maps that cover the area. This town was founded and built by African Americans, and insurance companies did not insure any buildings.

== List of notable buildings ==
- 103 Burns Street (c. 1950)
- 113 East Main Street (c. 1960)
- 213 East Main Street (c. 1955)
- 600 East Main Street (c. 1950)
- Orin’s Variety Store, 107 South Edwards Street (c. 1920)
- Pichard’s, 200 South Edwards Street (c. 1930)
- Club Jabot, 204 South Edwards Street (c. 1950)
- U.S. Post Office, 206 South Edwards Street (c. 1960)
- 301 South Edwards Street (c. 1925)
- Taborian Hospital, 102 East M.L.K. Jr. Drive (1942); also NRHP-listed, designed by McKissack & McKissack
- Isaiah T. Montgomery House, 302 West Main Street, South (1910); also NRHP-listed
- Eugene Parker Booze House, 308 West Main Street, North (1910)
- Mound Bayou Cemetery, south side of Mound Bayou Road (c. 1890)
- Bank of Mound Bayou, West Main Street (1904); also NRHP-listed

== See also ==
- National Register of Historic Places listings in Bolivar County, Mississippi
