= Mound Bayou Normal Institute =

School in Mound Bayou, Mississippi, US (1892–?)

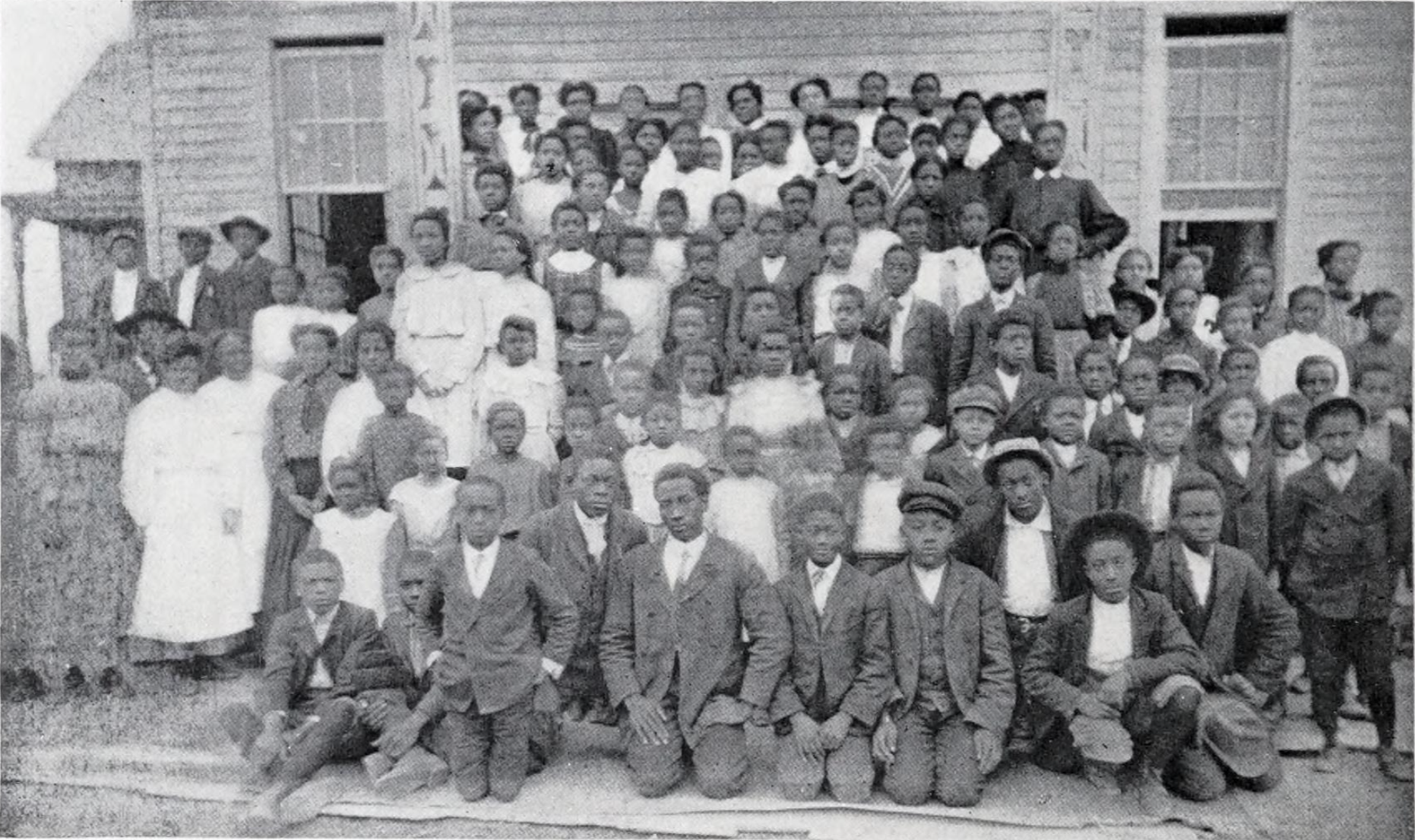
- Students at Mound Bayou Normal Institute, c. 1910
- Mound Bayou, Mississippi, U.S.

Information
- Other names: Colored School of Mound Bayou; Mound Bayou Normal and Industrial Institute
- Established: 1892
- Affiliation: American Missionary Association, Daniel Hand Fund

Mound Bayou Normal Institute was an elementary school and normal school for African American students founded in 1892, in Mound Bayou, Mississippi. It was also known as Mound Bayou Normal and Industrial Institute, and the Colored School of Mound Bayou.

== History ==
When the town of Mound Bayou was founded in 1887, students attended classes at the local Green Grove Baptist Church. Mound Bayou Normal Institute was founded in 1892, and funded by the American Missionary Association and the Daniel Hand Fund. The land for the campus was donated by Isaiah T. Montgomery and Benjamin Titus Green.

In 1908, the school had 5 teachers and 155 students. Former principals of the school included Fannie P. Ware, Minnie S. Washington–Jordan, Rev. B. F. Ousley (Benjamin Forsyth Ousley), and Frederick Madison Roberts. Notable former teachers included Mary Booze. Alumni included Benjamin A. Green.
