= Mabel Vernon Gray =

African American civil rights activist

- Born: October 10, 1895
- Died: November 26, 1981 (aged 86); Los Angeles, California, US
- Organizations: National Association of Colored Women's Clubs; YWCA; International Order of Twelve Knights and Daughters of Tabor; Heroines of Jericho; Congress of Racial Equality; Congress of American Women

Mabel Vernon Gray (1895–1981) was an African Americans civil rights activist, civic leader, and clubwoman. She was a Baptist and member of the National Association of Colored Women's Clubs and the Knights and Daughters of Tabor. Gray helped found the local chapter of the YWCA and actively participated in many charitable and club organizations around Los Angeles.

== Early life and education ==
Mabel V. Gray was the second daughter of James Dogans and Miranda Robinson Dogans. Her father worked as a pastor contractor in Los Angeles. She was reared by her grandparents in a religious atmosphere and was affiliated with both the Second Baptist Church and the New Hope Baptist Church (Los Angeles). Gray was educated in Los Angeles public schools.

== Career ==
=== Women's clubs ===
Mabel Vernon Gray served in leadership roles for multiple women's clubs and organizations. She was a member of the National Association of Colored Women's Clubs and held several posts throughout the organization, including the title of National Vice President, President and Vice President of the Southwest Regional Association of the NACWC. She was also a member of the affiliate organization, the California State Association of Colored Women (Southern Section). During her time with the Southwest Regional Association of the NACWC, she picketed the White House in Washington, D.C. to protest lynching and segregation. Gray was president of the Los Angeles Federation of Women's Clubs. She is also credited with organizing the Los Angeles chapter of the YWCA.

=== Community service and charity organizations ===
Gray held various memberships with charity organizations and was commonly seen performing community service. She was the International Grand High Perceptress of the Knights and Daughters of Tabor in the late 1940s. She was an active member in the Five-And-Over Charity Club, the Lafayette Junior High School PTA, Citizens Emergency Committee, Congress of Racial Equality, All-For-One Brotherhood, Eastside Settlement House, Los Angeles County Committee on Human Relations, Los Angeles Urban League, Avalon Community Center, Congress of American Women, and California Legislative Conference.

She was also a supporter of the Community Chest and Red Cross drives through selling war bonds. By 1948, she served over 5,000 hours of community service to United Service Organizations and earned the six star medal. She earned a plethora other awards from her dedication to community service and charitable organizations, including the Certificate for Meritorious Service from the Huge E. Macbeth and Historical Society, Certificate of Service from the Selective Service System, being elected the "Woman of the Week" and awarded a Meritorious Service Award (1947) by the Los Angeles Sentinel, and mentioned in the Los Angeles Neighborhood News. She was also honored at the Tuskegee Institute with Henry Wallace, previous Secretary of Agriculture, George Washington Carver, and the Governor of Tennessee.

== Personal life ==
Gray was married to Robert Vernon Gray, a chef in Los Angeles.
