= Estella Montgomery =

American homicide victim (1882–1939)

Estella Mary Montgomery Kent (née Estella Mary Montgomery; July 1882 – October 15, 1939) was an American homicide victim. She was the daughter of former slaves who founded the black community of Mound Bayou, Mississippi. She was killed by police in 1939 during a dispute over her father's estate.

== Biography ==
Estella Mary Montgomery was born in 1882 at Brierfield Plantation in Davis Bend, Mississippi, to parents Martha Robb and Isaiah Thornton Montgomery. Her parents were formerly enslaved by Joseph Emory Davis, the brother of Confederate President Jefferson Davis.

She graduated from Straight University. In 1904, she married James H. Kent, a prominent African barber in St. Louis and moved there. They divorced around 1920, she returned to her maiden name and moved back to Mound Bayou. When her father, Isaiah T. Montgomery died in 1924, she charged that the administrator of the estate, her brother-in-law Eugene P. Booze, had cheated her out of her inheritance. She mounted a legal challenge but without success.

In 1927, she charged that Booze and her sister Mary Montgomery Booze, had conspired in a plot along with Mayor Benjamin A. Green to poison her father. The charges were dismissed because of a lack of evidence. In 1939, Estella occupied the empty house of her late father in Mound Bayou which was then owned by Eugene and Mary Booze. Eugene Booze arranged for white deputies from a neighboring town to eject her from the house, but during the eviction process she was shot four times by the police and died. Nobody was ever charged.

Her homicide so angered residents of Mound Bayou, including Mayor Benjamin A. Green, that many demanded that Eugene P. Booze leave the community on account of how he dealt with his sister-in-law. Only weeks after her slaying, he was assassinated in Mound Bayou by parties unknown.
