= Frederick Madison Roberts =

American politician (1879–1952)

Frederick M. Roberts
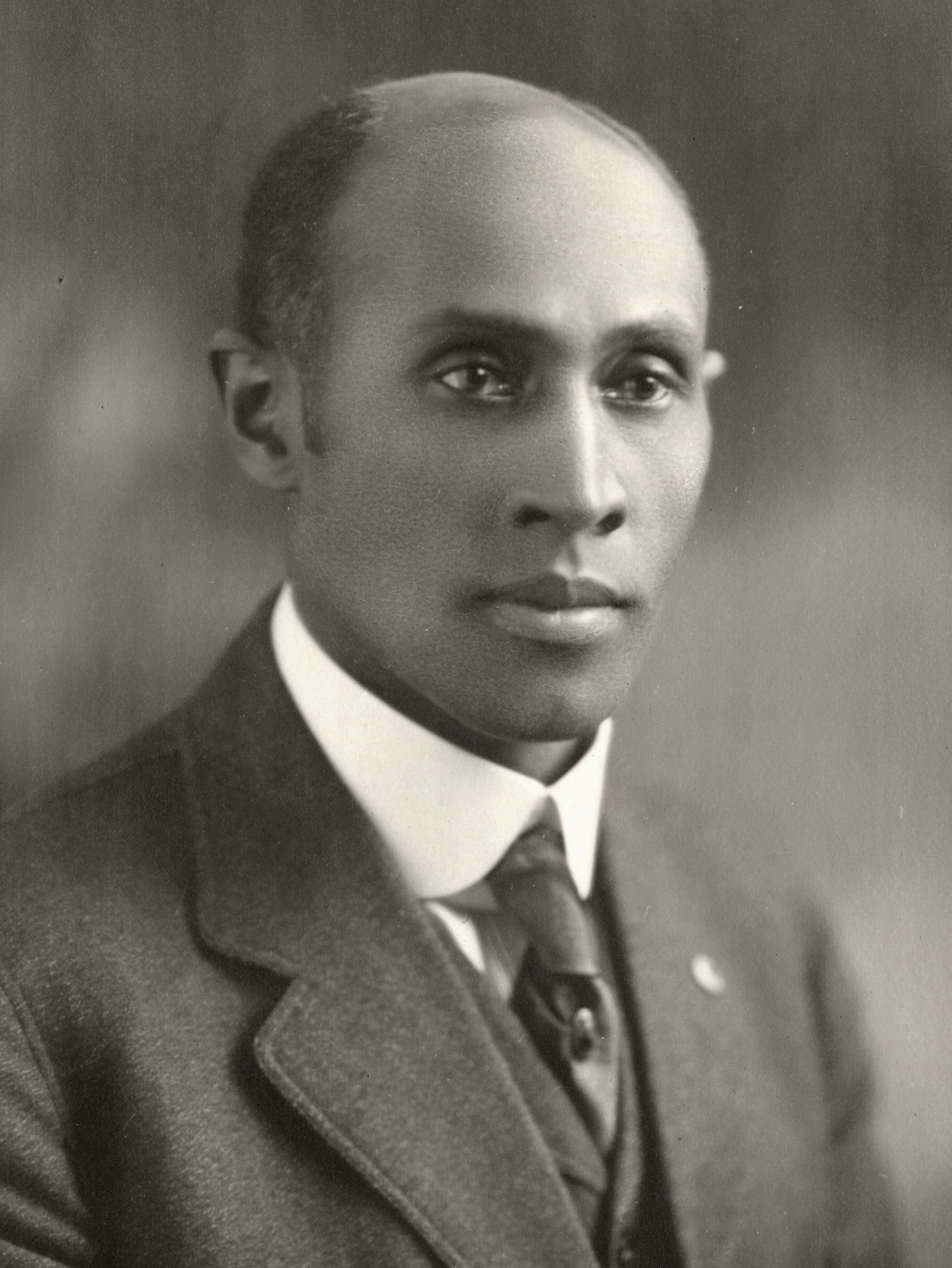
- Roberts in 1919

Member of the California State Assembly
- In office January 6, 1919 – January 7, 1935
- Preceded by: Frank H. Mouser
- Succeeded by: Augustus Hawkins
- Constituency: 74th district (1919–1931); 62nd district (1931–1935)

Personal details
- Born: September 14, 1879 Chillicothe, Ohio, U.S.
- Died: July 19, 1952 (aged 72) Los Angeles, California, U.S.
- Resting place: Evergreen Cemetery, Los Angeles
- Party: Republican
- Spouse: Pearl Hinds (m. 1921)
- Children: Gloria Roberts; Patricia Roberts
- Education: University of Southern California; Colorado College

Frederick Madison Roberts (September 14, 1879 – July 19, 1952) was an American newspaper owner and editor, educator and business owner; he became a politician, the first known man of African-American descent elected to the California State Assembly. He served there for 16 years and became known as "dean of the assembly." He has been honored as the first person of African-American descent to be elected to public office among the states on the West Coast.

Roberts was a great-grandson of Sally Hemings of Monticello and President Thomas Jefferson.

== Early life and education ==
Frederick Madison Roberts was born on September 14, 1879 in Chillicothe, Ohio to Ellen Wayles Hemings and Andrew Jackson Roberts. Ellen Wayles Hemings was the daughter of Madison Hemings, who was the son of Thomas Jefferson and Sally Hemings. Andrew was a graduate of Oberlin College and hailed from Chillicothe.

In 1865, the family moved to Los Angeles, where Andrew established A.J. Roberts and Son, the first black-owned mortuary in the city. The Roberts had a second son, William Giles Roberts. The family quickly became prosperous within the Los Angeles African American Community.

Roberts attended Los Angeles High School and was the first person of African-American descent to graduate from there. He attended the University of Southern California (USC), majoring in pre-law, and graduated from Colorado College. While in Colorado, he served as deputy assessor for El Paso County. Additionally, Roberts finished the Barnes-Worsham school of embalming and mortuary science.

== Career and civic life ==
In 1908, Roberts started editing the Colorado Springs Light newspaper. While in Colorado, he also served as deputy assessor for El Paso County. He went to Mound Bayou, Mississippi, where he served some years as principal of Mound Bayou Normal and Industrial Institute, one of a number of schools founded for African Americans in the segregated state system.

In 1912, Roberts returned to Los Angeles, where he founded The New Age Dispatch newspaper (later called New Age), which he edited until 1948. When he partnered with his father in the mortuary business, they named it A.J. Roberts & Son. Eventually he took it over.

Roberts, a newspaper editor and business owner, emerged as a prominent figure in the burgeoning African-American community of Los Angeles. During the 20th century, he witnessed the influx of people migrating from the South to various Northern, Midwestern, and Western states, known as the Great Migration. Additionally, Roberts actively participated in the Methodist church and held memberships in two influential organizations, the National Association for the Advancement of Colored People (NAACP) and the Urban League. These associations, established in the early 20th century, aimed to advocate for the political and civil rights of black people.

== Political career ==
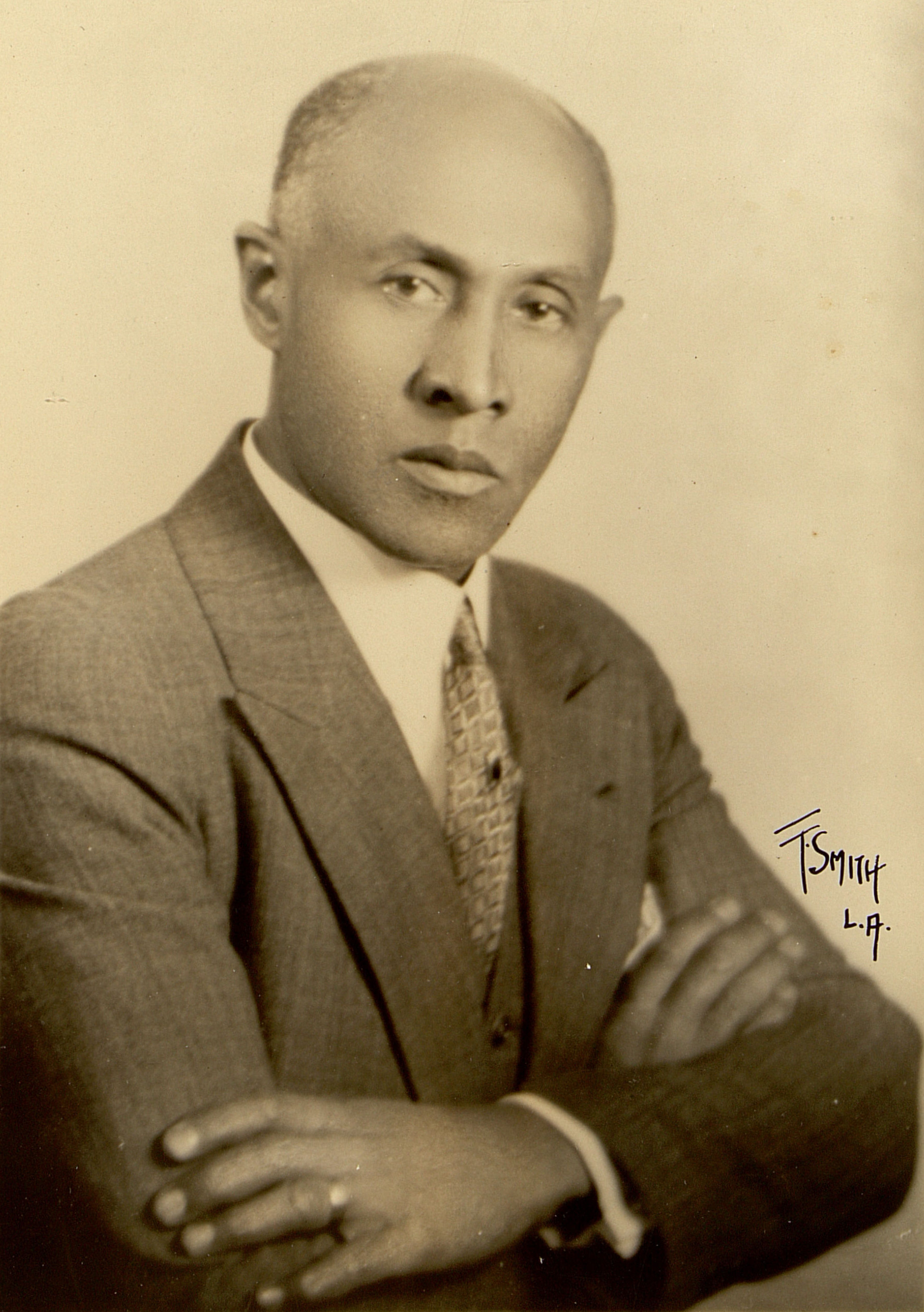
Roberts c. 1932.

In 1918, Roberts was elected to the California State Assembly from the 62nd District as a Republican in a hard-fought campaign, during which his chief rival made racial slurs against him. While in office, Roberts sponsored legislation to establish the University of California at Los Angeles and improve public education, and proposed several civil rights and anti-lynching measures. In June 1922, he welcomed Black Nationalist leader Marcus Garvey of the UNIA to Los Angeles and rode in his parade car.

Roberts was re-elected repeatedly and served a continuous total of 16 years, becoming known as the "dean of the assembly." He was friends with Earl Warren, the governor of California who later became Chief Justice of the United States. In the 1934 mid-term elections, after the election of Democrat Franklin Delano Roosevelt as president two years previously in the midst of the Great Depression, Roberts was defeated by a Democratic African-American candidate, Augustus F. Hawkins. Following his 1934 California State Assembly defeat, Roberts ran unsuccessfully for the United States House of Representatives on two occasions.

Beginning in the late 1930s and the early 1940s, the second wave of the Great Migration brought tens of thousands of African Americans from the Southern United States to the Los Angeles area for jobs in the growing defense industries. In 1946, Roberts campaigned for the 14th Congressional District against incumbent Helen Gahagan Douglas, but she kept her seat. A few years later, Douglas lost a hotly contested U.S. Senate race to Republican Richard M. Nixon.

== Personal life ==
In 1921, Roberts married Pearl Hinds Roberts (1892-1984), who had studied at the Boston Conservatory of Music and Oberlin Conservatory of Music. She was a pipe organist and founded a choral group that performed spirituals. They had two daughters, Gloria (1924-2011) and Patricia. Gloria was a concert pianist who performed across the United States and Europe. Patricia was a Los Angeles businesswoman.

== Death ==
On July 18, 1952, a few days after returning from the 1952 Republican National Convention, Roberts sustained serious injuries in a car crash in front of his Los Angeles home. He died the next day. Roberts is interred at Evergreen Cemetery.

== Legacy ==
- 1957 - The city of Los Angeles dedicated Frederick M. Roberts Park, in his memory.
- 2006 - Mervyn M. Dymally of the California State Legislature featured the Roberts' biography on his website to honor early political leaders as part of Black History Month.
- 2020 - Roberts was posthumously inducted into the California Newspaper Hall of Fame.

== See also ==
- List of African-American officeholders (1900–1959)

California Assembly
Preceded by Frank H. Mouser	Member of the California State Assembly from the 74th district January 6, 1919–January 5, 1931	Succeeded by Archibald E. Brock
Preceded by Walter J. Little	Member of the California State Assembly from the 62nd district January 5, 1931–January 7, 1935	Succeeded by Augustus Hawkins
