= Mary Booze =

African-American politician (1878–1955)

Mary Cordelia Montgomery Booze
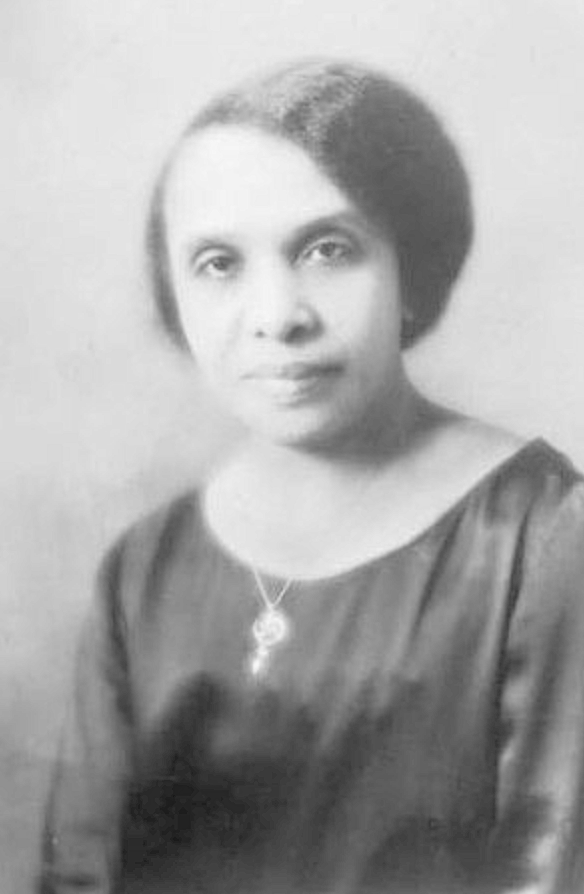
- Booze (c. 1920)

Member of the Republican National Committee from Mississippi
- In office 1924–1948 Serving with Perry Wilbon Howard II
- Preceded by: Office established
- Succeeded by: Edna Redmond

Personal details
- Born: Mary Cordelia Montgomery; March 1878 Davis Bend, Mississippi, U.S.
- Died: May 17, 1955 (aged 77) Hampton, Virginia, U.S.
- Party: Republican
- Spouse: Eugene P. Booze (m. 1901; died 1939)
- Children: 2
- Parent: Isaiah T. Montgomery (father)
- Relatives: Ben Montgomery (paternal grandfather), William Thornton Montgomery (paternal uncle) Estella Montgomery (sister)
- Education: Straight University
- Occupation: Businesswoman, political organizer, teacher at Mound Bayou Normal Institute, activist

Mary Cordelia Montgomery Booze (née Mary Cordelia Montgomery; March 1878 – May 17, 1955) was an American political organizer, teacher, businessperson, and activist. The daughter of former slaves, she was one of the first African-American women to sit on the Republican National Committee. From 1924 until 1948, she was the national committeewoman for her native state of Mississippi.

== Early life ==
Mary Cordelia Montgomery was born in 1878 at Brierfield Plantation to Isaiah Thornton Montgomery and Martha Robb Montgomery, former slaves of Joseph Emory Davis, brother of Confederate President Jefferson Davis. She was named for her maternal grandmother Mary Virginia Lewis Montgomery, wife of inventor Benjamin Montgomery. Montgomery lived most of her life in the black-controlled town of Mound Bayou in the Mississippi Delta which had been co-founded by her father.

== Late life and career ==
In 1924, Booze became a member of the Republican National Committee; she was one of the first African-American women to do so along with Mary Miller Williams of Georgia.

There was a Montgomery family feud over her father Isaiah T. Montgomery's estate after his death in 1924, and her husband Eugene Booze was the estate administrator. Some of the Montgomery daughters claimed they were not given fair shares of the estate, and the case was brought to court. On August 10, 1927, Mary and her husband, Eugene P. Booze were arrested and charged in a case brought by her sister Estella Montgomery with the poisoning of her father Isaiah T. Montgomery who died in 1924. Critics were immediately skeptical of the charges, which were dismissed without trial, and "further expressed the opinion that Mr. and Mrs. Booze are the victims of a frame-up designed to reflect discredit upon Mrs. Booze as National Republican Committee-woman".

During the 1928 presidential campaign, the notoriously racist Democratic Governor Theodore Bilbo, accused Republican candidate Herbert Hoover had danced with Booze, a “negress”, on the Mound Bayou train platform while he was Secretary of Commerce, during a brief stop as coordinator of Mississippi flood relief in 1927. Booze called the statement “ridiculous" adding that "I am upwards of 50 years of age, a consistent member of the Methodist church and do not dance. I have no idea whether Mr. Hoover dances or not”.

In her capacity as a member of the Republican National Committee, Booze also she did not hesitate to speak out about President Hoover's appointments. She led an ultimately successful campaign against three presidential nominees: Lester G. Fant (for district attorney for the Northern District of Mississippi), Edwin W. Holmes (for Circuit Court of Appeals) and B.B. Montgomery (for federal marshal for the Northern District of Mississippi) because of allegedly racist actions and comments. In the case of Montgomery, she worked in close cooperation with the NAACP and pro-civil rights senators to promote a successful filibuster against the nomination. Despite her criticism of Hoover, she supported him for reelection and was instrumental in getting him the overwhelming majority of the vote of Mound Bayou's residents in 1932.
