= Mound Bayou Industrial College =

College in Mound Bayou, Mississippi, US (1900–1936)

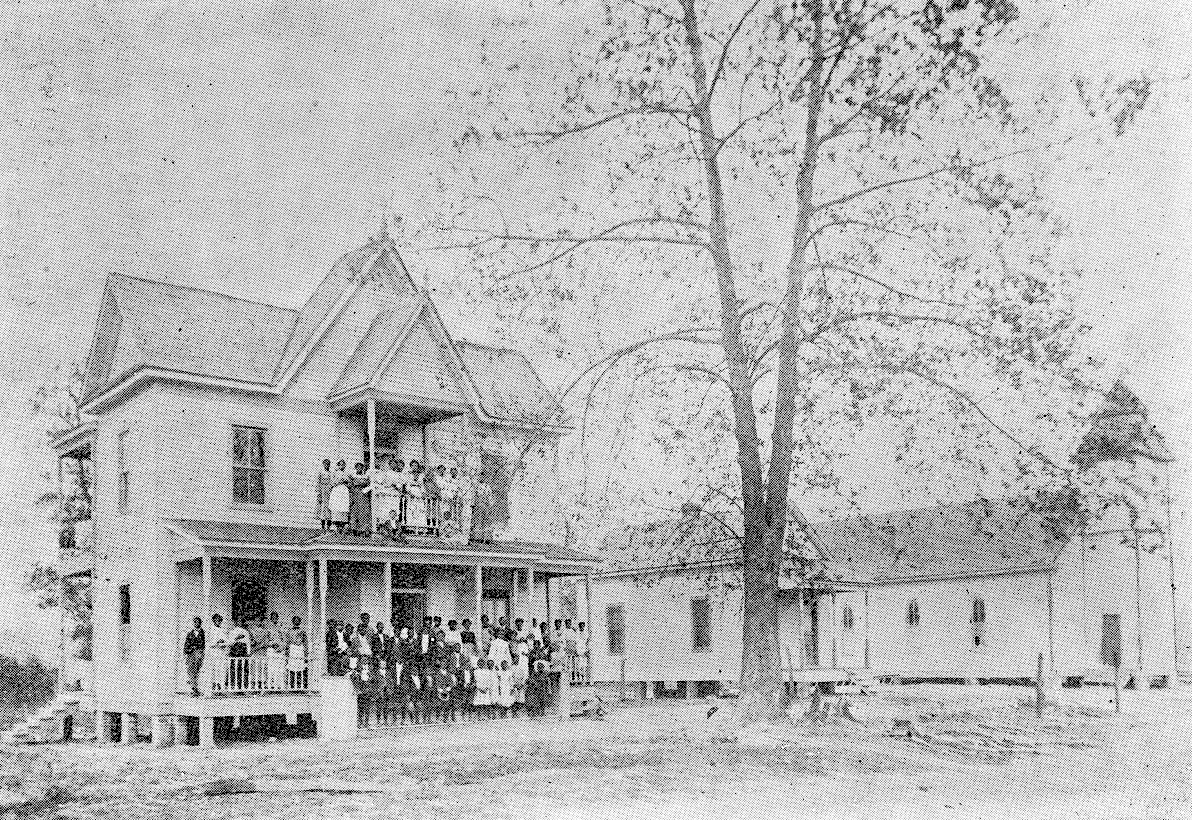
- Mound Bayou, Mississippi, U.S.

Information
- Other names: Baptist College
- Former name: Mound Bayou Baptist College
- Religious affiliation: Baptist Church
- Established: 1900
- Founder: A. A. Harris
- Closed: 1936

Mound Bayou Industrial College was a private Baptist industrial college for African American students active from 1900 until 1936 in Mound Bayou, Mississippi, United States. It was nicknamed "Baptist College", and also known as Mound Bayou Baptist College.

It was established in 1900 by A. A. Harris at the General Baptist State Convention, and opened by 1904. The school was financed by funds raised by the women workers of the General Baptist Convention. Mrs. L. V. Alexander was the president, and R. McCorkle was the principal.

The school closed in 1936.
