= National Register of Historic Places listings in Bolivar County, Mississippi =

Location of Bolivar County in Mississippi

This is a list of the National Register of Historic Places listings in Bolivar County, Mississippi.

This is intended to be a complete list of the properties and districts on the National Register of Historic Places in Bolivar County, Mississippi, United States. Latitude and longitude coordinates are provided for many National Register properties and districts; these locations may be seen together in a map.

There are 16 properties and districts listed on the National Register in the county, including 1 National Historic Landmark.

This National Park Service list is complete through NPS recent listings posted March 14, 2025.

== Current listings ==
| | Name on the Register | Image | Date listed | Location | City or town | Description |
|---|---|---|---|---|---|---|
| 1 | Adath Israel Temple | Adath Israel Temple | December 12, 2002 (#02001499) | 201 S. Bolivar Ave. 33°44′34″N 90°43′28″W | Cleveland | |
| 2 | Alligator Mounds | | July 24, 1974 (#74001056) | Northwestern quarter of the northeastern quarter of Section 32, Township 26 North, Range 5 West; 34°05′26″N 90°44′14″W | Alligator | |
| 3 | AMPCO Manufacturing Plant | | January 27, 2021 (#100006103) | 101 AMPCO Rd. 33°52′00″N 91°01′06″W | Rosedale | |
| 4 | Cleveland Founders Historic District | | November 14, 2007 (#07001179) | Roughly bounded by Victoria Ave., Sunflower Rd., Bolivar Ave., S. Bayou Ave., and Avery St. 33°44′42″N 90°43′35″W | Cleveland | |
| 5 | Donelson House | | August 13, 1976 (#76001091) | 2.5 miles southwest of Duncan; 34°01′35″N 90°46′46″W | Duncan | |
| 6 | Downtown Cleveland Historic District | Downtown Cleveland Historic District | May 4, 1999 (#98001332) | Roughly bounded by Bolivar Ave., 1 block north of 1st St., Commerce Ave., and Collins St.; also 201 S. Court St. and 200-215 N. Pearman Ave. 33°44′54″N 90°43′21″W | Cleveland | Court and Pearman addresses represent a boundary increase of July 7, 2003 |
| 7 | Grace Episcopal Church | Grace Episcopal Church | December 11, 1980 (#80002202) | 203 Main St. 33°51′22″N 91°01′38″W | Rosedale | |
| 8 | Hollywood | Hollywood | April 1, 1975 (#75001041) | South of Benoit on Mississippi Highway 448; 33°38′23″N 91°00′17″W | Benoit | |
| 9 | I. T. Montgomery House | I. T. Montgomery House | May 11, 1976 (#76001092) | W. Main St. 33°52′37″N 90°43′44″W | Mound Bayou | |
| 10 | Mound Bayou Bank | Mound Bayou Bank | March 1, 1996 (#96000187) | W. Main St. 33°52′32″N 90°43′43″W | Mound Bayou | |
| 11 | Mound Bayou Historic District | | September 11, 2013 (#13000735) | Roughly bounded by Martin Luther King Ave., Mound Bayou Cemetery, South & Davis Sts. 33°52′42″N 90°43′49″W | Mound Bayou | |
| 12 | Rosedale Historic District | | April 6, 2000 (#00000331) | Roughly along Main, Front, and Levee Sts., from Elizabeth Ave. to Brown St. 33°51′27″N 91°01′41″W | Rosedale | |
| 13 | Shaw Consolidated School | | January 11, 2017 (#100000536) | 214 Dean Blvd. 33°35′57″N 90°46′14″W | Shaw | |
| 14 | Walter Sillers Sr. House | | March 21, 1997 (#97000252) | 307 Levee St. 33°51′34″N 91°01′50″W | Rosedale | |
| 15 | Taborian Hospital | | August 1, 1996 (#96000827) | U.S. Route 61 at its junction with McGinnis St. 33°52′48″N 90°43′36″W | Mound Bayou | |
| 16 | U.S. Post Office | | April 7, 1981 (#81000326) | 301 S. Sharpe Ave. 33°44′32″N 90°43′18″W | Cleveland | Now a police station. |

== See also ==
- List of National Historic Landmarks in Mississippi
- National Register of Historic Places listings in Mississippi
