= A.C. Jackson =

African-American surgeon

Dr. A.C. Jackson
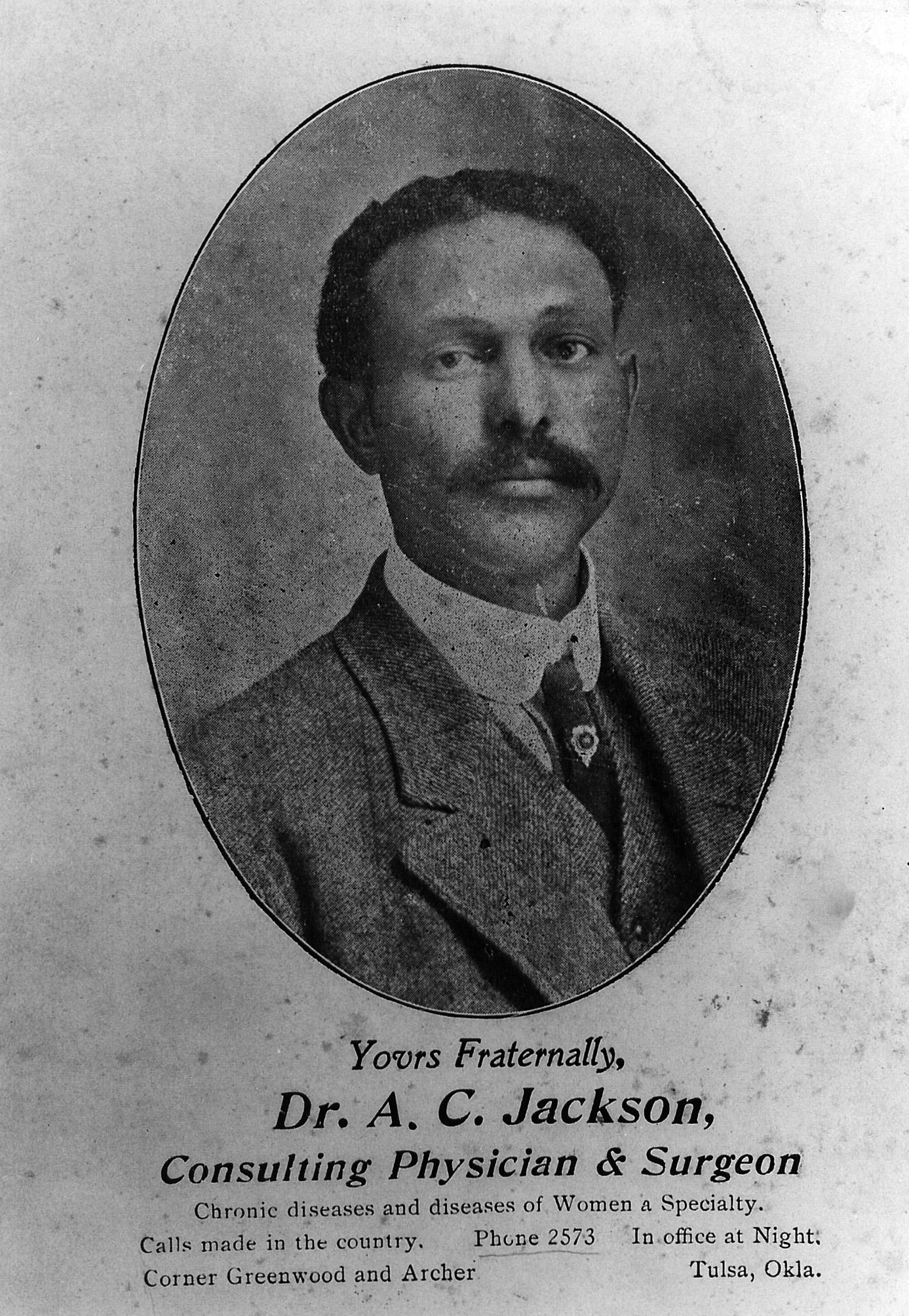
- Portrait of A. C. Jackson
- Born: February , 1879; Memphis, Tennessee
- Died: June 1, 1921 (aged 42); Tulsa, Oklahoma
- Education: Meharry Medical College
- Occupation: Surgeon
- Years active: 1910-1921
- Known for: Death in Tulsa Race Massacre

A.C. Jackson (February , 1879-June 1, 1921) was an African American surgeon who was murdered during the Tulsa race massacre in 1921 and is known as the most prominent victim of the massacre. Jackson was a leading member of the Oklahoma medical community and the African-American community in Tulsa, Oklahoma until his death.

Jackson was considered as the "most able Negro surgeon in America" by the Mayo brothers, founders of the Mayo Clinic.

== Early life and education ==
He was born in Memphis to Captain Townsend D. Jackson and Sophronia in February 1879. Townsend Jackson was a former slave from Georgia who had served in the Union Army during the American Civil War and Sophronia was a former slave from Texas. He was the youngest of three children. The family moved to Guthrie in 1889, where his father worked as the town jailer and was elected justice of the peace. Jackson graduated from Meharry Medical College in Nashville and trained as a surgeon in Memphis.

== Move to Tulsa ==
In 1910, he married his wife, Julia, and due to increasing segregation and racial animosity toward African-Americans in Guthrie the young couple moved to the Greenwood district in Tulsa. Jackson set up his practice in Greenwood and served as the president of the state medical association. In 1916, he expanded his practice opening up a location in Claremore and in 1918 he met with the then mayor of Tulsa about opening up the "Booker T. Washington Hospital for Negros" on the corner of Boston Ave. and Archer St. The hospital was not built. He was a member of the International Order of Twelve Knights and Daughters of Tabor, an African American fraternal organization, and served on the board of directors of the Colored Orphan Home for Tulsa. Some of the surgical tools he invented are still in use today.

== Death ==
Former police commissioner and retired judge John Oliphant reported that Jackson was fatally shot in 1921 during the Tulsa race massacre when he "came walking toward me with his hands in the air" saying "here am I. I want to go with you", surrendering. A mob of about seven armed men intercepted him and two of them shot him. One of the men shot him after he had fallen to the ground. He bled to death from his wounds at the Convention Hall.

=== Killer ===
Conflicting reports on the identity of the shooter exist, but sources agree no one was ever charged for the murder of A.C. Jackson. The Tulsa World reported in 2020 that his shooter was never positively identified, but John Oliphant named a former Tulsa Police Department officer named Brown as one of the armed men.

The Victory of Greenwood, a historical project by Tulsa Star editor Timantha Norman, identifies James “Cowboy” Long as Jackson's killer citing John Oliphant's testimony on July 21, 1921, to the State Attorney General's office.
