= Mound Bayou, Mississippi =

City in Mississippi, United States

- City
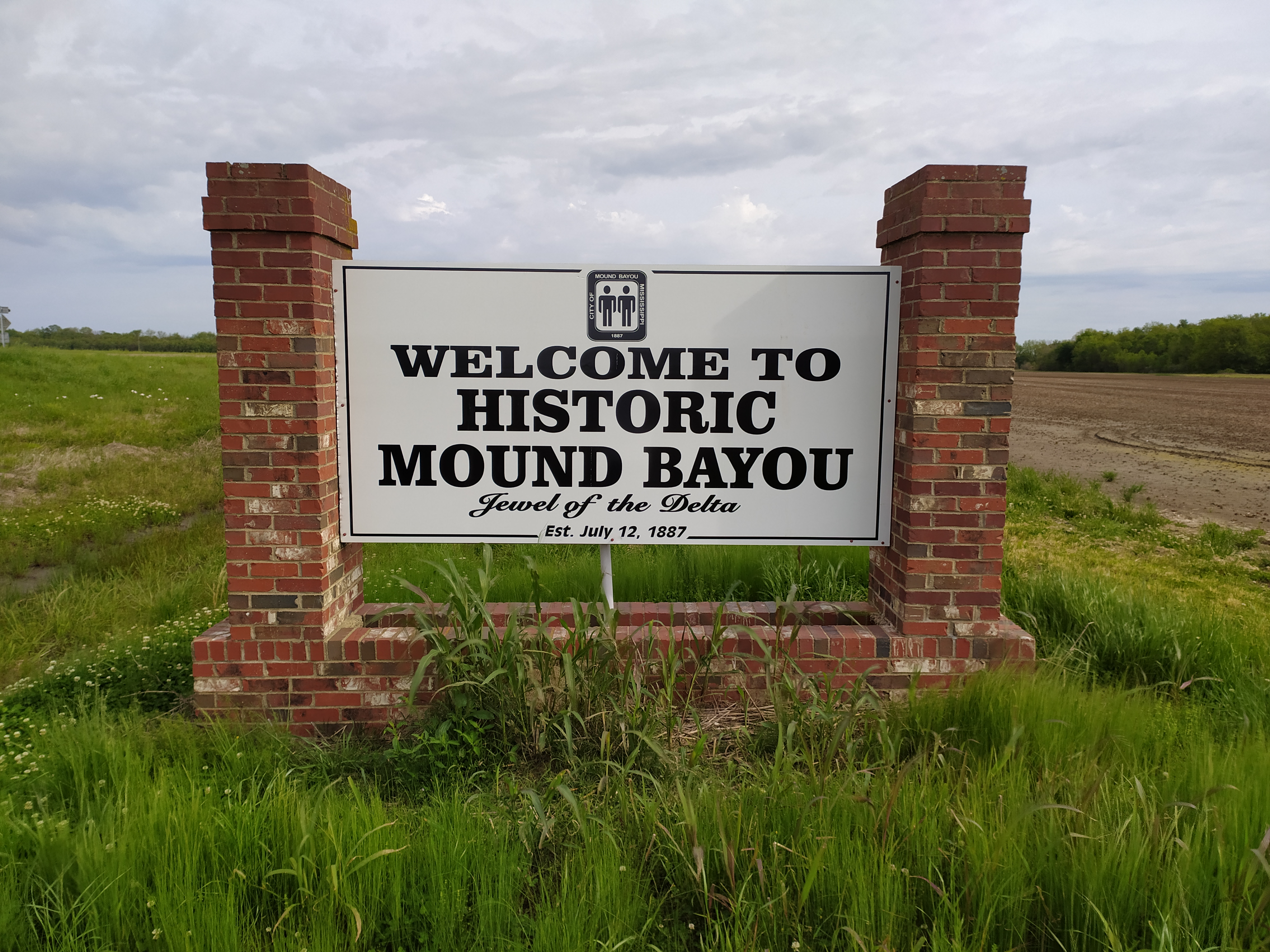
- Mound Bayou welcome sign in 2020

- Seal
- Nickname: Jewel of the Delta
- Location of Mound Bayou in Mississippi

- Location in the United States
- Coordinates: 33°52′50″N 90°43′41″W
- Country: United States
- State: Mississippi
- County: Bolivar
- Founded: July 12, 1887
- Incorporated -City status: February 23, 1898; May 12, 1972

Government
  - Mayor: Leighton Aldridge

Area
  - Total: 0.88 sq mi (2.27 km^{2})
  - Land: 0.88 sq mi (2.27 km^{2})
  - Water: 0 sq mi (0.00 km^{2})
- Elevation: 144 ft (44 m)

Population (2020)
  - Total: 1,534
  - Density: 1,749.8/sq mi (675.62/km^{2})
- Time zone: UTC-6 (CST)
  - Summer (DST): UTC-5 (CDT)
- ZIP code: 38762
- Area code: 662
- FIPS code: 28-49320
- GNIS feature ID: 2404316
- Website: cityofmoundbayou.com

Mound Bayou is a city in Bolivar County, Mississippi, United States. The population was 1,534 at the 2020 census, down from 2,102 in 2000. It was founded as an independent Black community in 1887 by former slaves led by Isaiah Montgomery. Mound Bayou Historic District is listed on the National Register of Historic Places.

Mound Bayou has a 96.8% African-American majority population in 2020, one of the highest percentages of any community in the United States.

== History ==
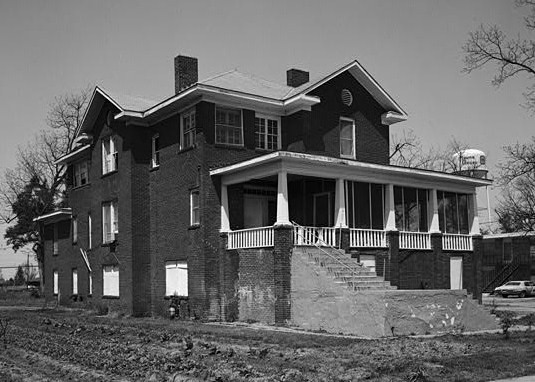
I. T. Montgomery House is one of three sites in Mound Bayou listed on the National Register of Historic Places.

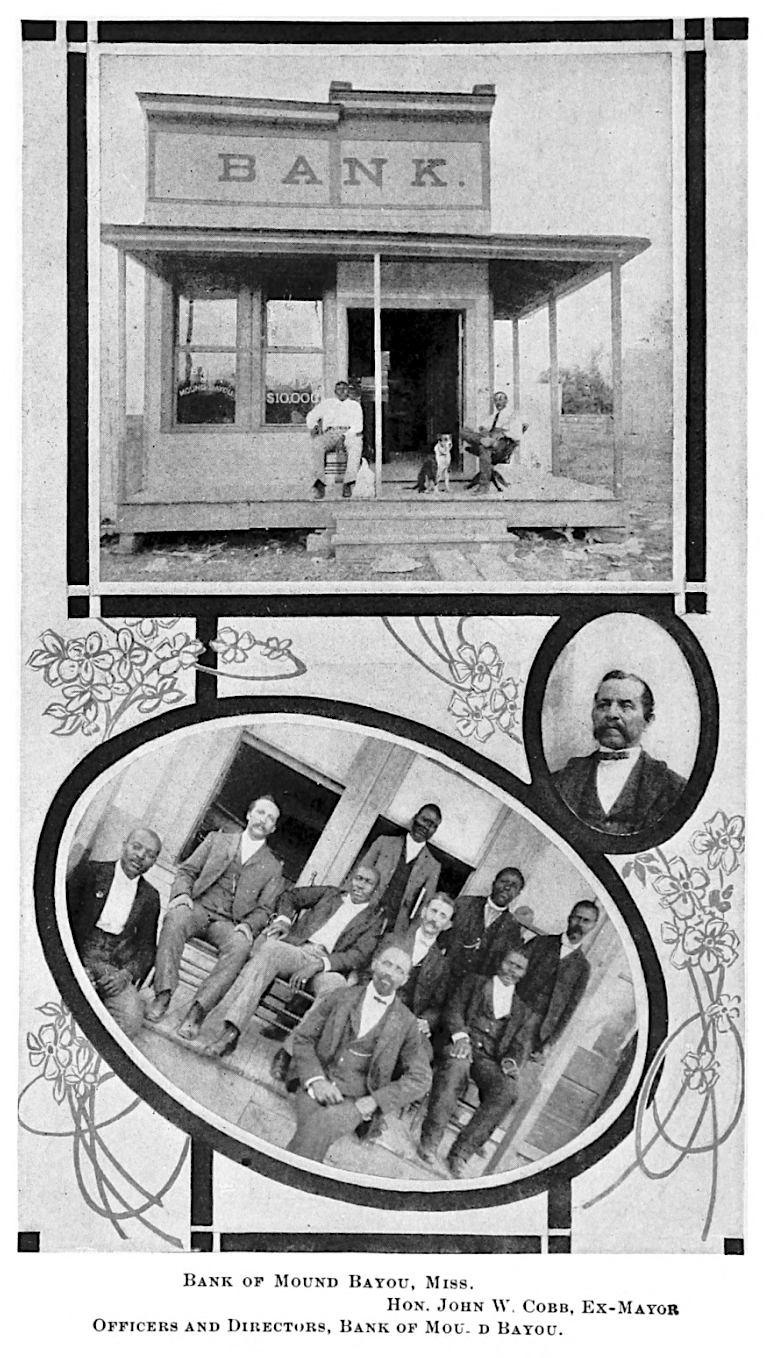
Bank of Mound Bayou, Mississippi (1907), picture of Hon. John W. Cobb, Ex-Mayor, and the officers and directors of the Bank of Mound Bayou

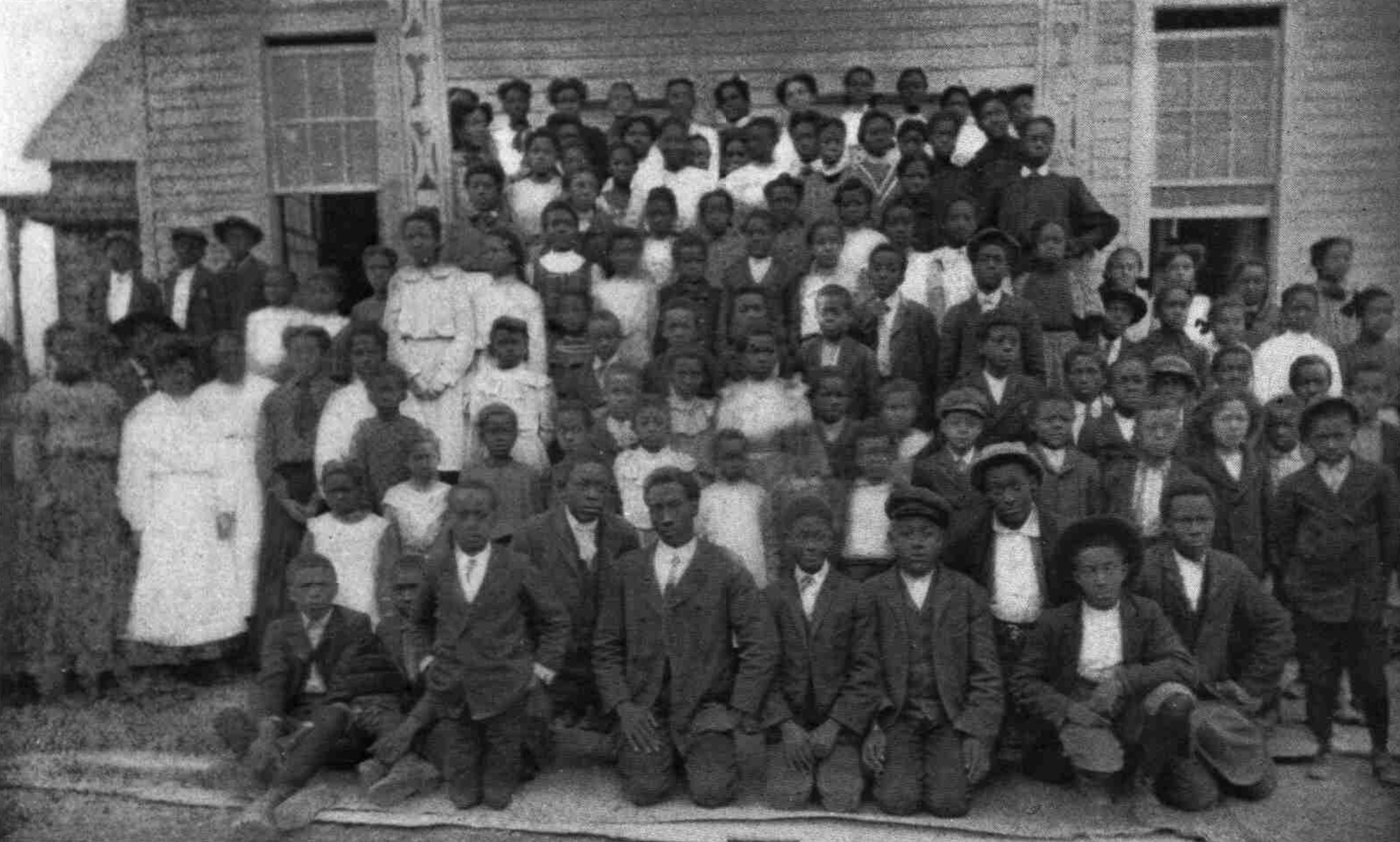
Mound Bayou Normal Institute, 1910

In the aftermath of the Civil War, Davis Bend became an autonomous free community when Joseph Emory Davis sold his property to former slave Benjamin Montgomery, who had run a store and been a prominent leader at Davis Bend. The prolonged agricultural depression, falling cotton prices, flooding by the Mississippi River, and white hostility in the region contributed to the economic failure of Davis Bend.

The two main founders of Mound Bayou in 1887 were Isaiah T. Montgomery, Benjamin's son, and Isaiah's cousin, Benjamin Titus Green. Montgomery also served as the first mayor.

The bottomlands of the Delta were a relatively undeveloped frontier, and freedmen had a chance to make money by clearing land and using the profits to buy land in such frontier areas. In 1892, the Mound Bayou Normal Institute, a Black school, was founded by the American Missionary Association.

African Americans throughout the United States celebrated the Mound Bayou example. In 1908, President Theodore Roosevelt ordered his train to make a special stop in the town. From the platform, he proclaimed that he was witnessing “an object lesson full of hope for the colored people and therefore full of hope for the white people, too.” Four years later, Booker T. Washington, in a speech to a crowd of thousands, hailed Mound Bayou as a “place where a Negro may get inspiration by seeing what other members of his race have accomplished...[and] where he has an opportunity to learn some of the fundamental duties and responsibilities of social and civic life.”

In 1900 the Mound Bayou Industrial College (also known as the "Baptist College") was established for African American students and was active until 1936.

The belief of Mound Bayou's citizens in their role as promoting a Black model of freedom and self-government was instrumental in weathering the decline in the two decades after World War I. No person was more effective in keeping the town afloat than Mayor Benjamin A. Green, a son of Benjamin Titus Green and the first person born in the community. A Harvard Law School graduate, he won overwhelmingly for mayor in 1919 and served until he died in 1960. Green's diplomatic skills proved crucial in navigating external threats and keeping internal peace.

In the 1920s, Green volunteered to be a possible attorney for use by the NAACP in legal cases. His willingness to publicly align with that organization was not an exception in the community. Mound Bayou had a greater NAACP membership as a percentage of the Black population than any other Mississippi community.

Shortly after a fire destroyed much of the business district, Mound Bayou began to revive in 1942 after the opening of the Taborian Hospital by the International Order of Twelve Knights and Daughters of Tabor, a fraternal organization. For more than two decades, under its Chief Grand Mentor Perry M. Smith, the hospital provided low-cost health care to thousands of Black people in the Mississippi Delta. The chief surgeon was T.R.M. Howard, who eventually became one of the wealthiest Black men in the state. Howard owned a plantation of more than 1,000 acres (4.0 km^{2}), a home-construction firm, and a small zoo, and he built the first swimming pool for black people in Mississippi.

In 1952, Medgar Evers moved to Mound Bayou to sell insurance for Howard's Magnolia Mutual Life Insurance Company. Howard introduced Evers to civil rights activism through the Regional Council of Negro Leadership, which organized a boycott against service stations that refused to provide restrooms for Black people. The RCNL's annual rallies in Mound Bayou between 1952 and 1955 drew crowds of 10,000 or more. During the trial of Emmett Till's killers, Black reporters and witnesses stayed in Howard's Mound Bayou home, and Howard gave them an armed escort to the courthouse in Sumner.

Author Michael Premo wrote:

"Mound Bayou was an oasis in turbulent times. While the rest of Mississippi was violently segregated, inside the city there were no racial codes ... At a time when Blacks faced repercussions as severe as death for registering to vote, Mound Bayou residents were casting ballots in every election. The city has a proud history of credit unions, insurance companies, a hospital, five newspapers, and a variety of businesses owned, operated, and patronized by Black residents. Mound Bayou is a crowning achievement in the struggle for self-determination and economic empowerment."

== Geography ==
U.S. Routes 61 and 278 bypass Mound Bayou to the west and lead south 9 miles (14 km) to Cleveland, the largest city in Bolivar County, and north 27 miles (43 km) to Clarksdale.

According to the United States Census Bureau, the city of Mound Bayou has a total area of 0.9 square miles (2.3 km^{2}), all land.

== Demographics ==
Historical population
Census	Pop.	Note	%±
1900	287		—
1910	537		87.1%
1920	803		49.5%
1930	834		3.9%
1940	806		−3.4%
1950	1,328		64.8%
1960	1,354		2.0%
1970	2,134		57.6%
1980	2,917		36.7%
1990	2,222		−23.8%
2000	2,102		−5.4%
2010	1,533		−27.1%
2020	1,534		0.1%
U.S. Decennial Census

=== Racial and ethnic composition ===
Mound Bayou city, Mississippi – Racial and ethnic composition Note: the US Census treats Hispanic/Latino as an ethnic category. This table excludes Latinos from the racial categories and assigns them to a separate category. Hispanics/Latinos may be of any race.
Race / Ethnicity (NH = Non-Hispanic)	Pop 2000	Pop 2010	Pop 2020	% 2000	% 2010	% 2020
White alone (NH)	17	14	7	0.81%	0.91%	0.46%
Black or African American alone (NH)	2,061	1,503	1,485	98.05%	98.04%	96.81%
Native American or Alaska Native alone (NH)	1	0	0	0.05%	0.00%	0.00%
Asian alone (NH)	5	1	0	0.24%	0.07%	0.00%
Native Hawaiian or Pacific Islander alone (NH)	0	0	0	0.00%	0.00%	0.00%
Other race alone (NH)	1	0	5	0.05%	0.00%	0.33%
Mixed race or Multiracial (NH)	9	1	26	0.43%	0.07%	1.69%
Hispanic or Latino (any race)	8	14	11	0.38%	0.91%	0.72%
Total	2,102	1,533	1,534	100.00%	100.00%	100.00%

=== 2020 census ===
As of the 2020 census, Mound Bayou had a population of 1,534. There were 376 families residing in the city. The median age was 35.9 years. 27.1% of residents were under the age of 18 and 17.3% of residents were 65 years of age or older. For every 100 females there were 83.7 males, and for every 100 females age 18 and over there were 72.0 males age 18 and over.

0.0% of residents lived in urban areas, while 100.0% lived in rural areas.

There were 629 households in Mound Bayou, of which 31.5% had children under the age of 18 living in them. Of all households, 13.8% were married-couple households, 24.3% were households with a male householder and no spouse or partner present, and 58.2% were households with a female householder and no spouse or partner present. About 39.2% of all households were made up of individuals and 13.9% had someone living alone who was 65 years of age or older.

There were 683 housing units, of which 7.9% were vacant. The homeowner vacancy rate was 1.1% and the rental vacancy rate was 4.3%.

=== 2010 census ===
As of the 2010 United States census, there were 1,533 people living in the city. The racial makeup of the city was 98.0% Black, 0.9% White, 0.1% Asian and 0.1% from two or more races. 0.9% were Hispanic or Latino of any race.

=== 2000 census ===
As of the census of 2000, there were 2,102 people, 687 households, and 504 families living in the city. The population density was 2,395.1 inhabitants per square mile (924.8/km^{2}). There were 723 housing units at an average density of 823.8 per square mile (318.1/km^{2}). The racial makeup of the city was 98.43% African American, 0.05% Native American, 0.24% Asian, 0.81% White, 0.05% from other races, and 0.43% from two or more races. Hispanic or Latino of any race were 0.38% of the population.

There were 687 households, of which 38.4% had children younger than age 18 in them, 24.7% were married couples living together, 43.7% had a female householder with no husband present, and 26.5% were non-families. 24.7% of all households were made up of individuals, and 9.8% had someone living alone who was 65 years of age or older. The average household size was 3.06, and the average family size was 3.66.

In the city, the population was spread out, with 34.7% younger than age 18, 12.9% from ages 18 to 24, 23.5% from ages 25 to 44, 19.1% from ages 45 to 64, and 9.8% who were 65 or older. The median age was 27 years. For every 100 females, there were 78.3 males. For every 100 females age 18 and older, there were 67.6 males.

The median income for a household in the city was $17,972, and the median income for a family was $19,770. Males had a median income of $21,700 versus $18,988 for females. The per capita income for the city was $8,227. About 41.9% of families and 45.6% of the population were below the poverty line, including 58.5% of those under age 18 and 34.5% of those age 65 and older.

== Education ==
=== Primary and secondary schools ===
The city of Mound Bayou is served by the North Bolivar Consolidated School District, which operates I.T. Montgomery Elementary School in Mound Bayou and Northside High School in Shelby. The elementary school is named after Mound Bayou cofounder Isaiah T. Montgomery.

In its earliest years, Mound Bayou struggled with inadequate public school infrastructure. According to a 1915 report in the Cincinnati Labor Advocate, Mound Bayou's public school (which was maintained by white-controlled Bolivar County) was attended by more than 300 students who were forced to make use of equipment held to be "inadequate for 50 pupils". Teachers at the school were "poorly paid" and the school year limited to only five months.

St. Gabriel Mission School in Mound Bayou was part of the Roman Catholic Diocese of Jackson, which was formerly the Roman Catholic Diocese of Natchez and Roman Catholic Diocese of Jackson-Natchez. The school opened as a K-8 facility on September 7, 1954. The high school opened in 1958 but closed in 1961. Its non-preschool grades ended in 1994 when it was converted into a preschool. The preschool closed in 2001.

On July 1, 2014, the North Bolivar School District consolidated with the Mound Bayou Public School District to form the North Bolivar Consolidated School District. John F. Kennedy Memorial High School in Mound Bayou, formerly the secondary school of the Mound Bayou district, closed in 2018.

=== Colleges and universities ===
Bolivar County residents have residency for two community colleges: Coahoma Community College and Mississippi Delta Community College. Their main campuses respectively are in unincorporated Coahoma County and Moorhead in Sunflower County.

== Health care ==
The last hospital in town closed in 1983.

A branch of Delta Health Center is located in Mound Bayou. Founded in Mound Bayou in 1967, Delta Health Center was the first rural community health center in the United States.

== Notable people ==
- Charles Banks (1873–1923) African-American businessman
- Eugene P. Booze (1879–1939) African-American businessman
- Mary Montgomery Booze (1878–1955), first African-American woman to sit on the Republican National Committee; born in Mound Bayou
- General Crook, musician; born in Mound Bayou
- Medgar Evers (1925–1963), civil rights leader and soldier
- Myrlie Evers-Williams (born 1933), widow of Medgar Evers; civil rights leader, journalist, NAACP Chair
- Minnie L. Fisher, local community activist
- Lorenzo Gray (born 1958), baseball player; born in Mound Bayou
- Katie Hall (1938–2012), politician, U.S. Representative from Indiana from 1982 to 1985; born in Mound Bayou
- Fannie Lou Hamer (1917–1977), civil rights leader
- Kevin Henry (born 1968), football player; born in Mound Bayou
- Russell Holmes, Massachusetts state representative (6th Suffolk); born in Mound Bayou
- T. R. M. Howard (1908–1976), physician, surgeon, leader of civil rights and fraternal organizations, and entrepreneur
- Estella Montgomery (1882–1939), homicide victim
- Isaiah Montgomery (1847–1924), politician, town founder, mayor
- Harold Robert Perry (1916–1991), first African-American to serve as a Catholic bishop in the 20th century
- Melvin "Mel" Reynolds, politician; born in Mound Bayou
- Kelly Miller Smith Sr., preacher, author, and civil rights leader; born in Mound Bayou
- Lewis Ossie Swingler, journalist, editor, and newspaper publisher
- Ed Townsend, singer, songwriter, producer, and attorney

== Cultural references ==
Mound Bayou was featured in the 2022 film, Till. The supporters of Emmett Till's mother, Mamie, were residents of the town and hosted her when she testified in the trial of her son's killers. Mound Bayou was also mentioned in the 2025 film Sinners and is referenced in a piece on the soundtrack album titled "Mound Bayou / Proper Black Folks".

Ed Townsend wrote the Marvin Gaye hit song "Let's Get It On" in Mound Bayou.

== See also ==
- Mound Bayou Historic District
- National Register of Historic Places listings in Bolivar County, Mississippi
