= Benjamin A. Green =

American lawyer, business person, mayor (1888–1960)

Benjamin Allen Morris Green (September 20, 1888 – November 10, 1960) was the African American mayor of the black community of Mound Bayou, Mississippi, a lawyer, businessman, and activist. He graduated from Harvard Law School. He was the son of Benjamin Titus Green, a former slave of Joseph Emory Davis, the brother of Confederate President Jefferson Davis. Green was a leading black elected official in Mississippi from the 1910s until 1960.

== Life and career ==
Benjamin Allen Green was born on September 20, 1888, in Mound Bayou, Mississippi, to parents Eva Pearl (née Frances) and Benjamin Titus Green. He was the first person born in Mound Bayou, soon after the founding of the community by his father Benjamin T. Green and Isaiah T. Montgomery. Green graduated from Fisk University (A.B. 1909) in Nashville; and Harvard Law School (LL.B. 1914).

He served with the Judge Advocate Office of the 92nd Division during World War I. In 1919, the voters of Mound Bayou overwhelming elected him as a mayor, and he served in that position until his death in 1960.

Green's diplomatic skills proved critical in navigating around external threats and keeping internal peace. A key accomplishment of his tenure was a very low crime rate, despite the closing of the town's jail in 1929 as a “needless expense” and the town had only part time police: a town marshal, who doubled as the local “hot-dog man,” and a black deputy delegated by the county sheriff.

In his capacity as attorney of the International Order of Twelve Knights and Daughters, Green was instrumental in the decision of that organization to build the Taborian Hospital in Mound Bayou. It was the leading black hospital in that part of the state.

Although he was a Republican, Green led a quiet effort in the late 1940s to encourage blacks to vote in the Democratic Party primary (which was then tantamount to election). The effort was so successful that more African Americans voted in the primary in the small town of Mound Bayou than in Jackson, Mississippi.
