= I. T. Montgomery House =

Historic house in Mississippi, United States

- U.S. National Register of Historic Places
- U.S. National Historic Landmark
- Mississippi Landmark
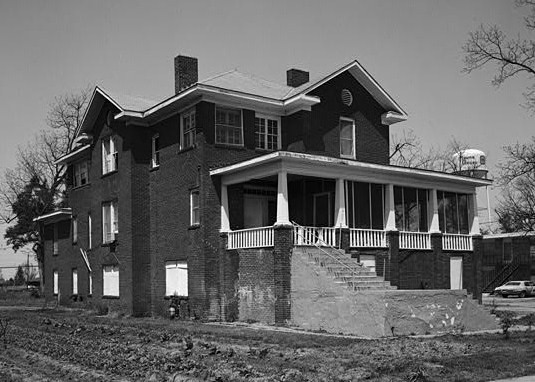
- I. T. Montgomery House (circa 1980)

- Location within Mississippi Location within the United States
- Location: 302 West Main Street, Mound Bayou, Mississippi, U.S.
- Coordinates: 33°52′37.25″N 90°43′43.6″W
- Built: 1910
- NRHP reference No.: 76001092
- USMS No.: 011-MBU-0001-NHL-ML

Significant dates
- Added to NRHP: May 11, 1976
- Designated NHL: May 11, 1976
- Designated USMS: August 13, 2003

The I. T. Montgomery House is a historic house on 302 West Main Street in Mound Bayou, Mississippi, United States. Built in 1910, it was the home of Isaiah Montgomery (1847–1924), a former slave of Jefferson Davis who was instrumental in founding Mound Bayou, one of the first economically successful towns established by freed slaves.

It was declared a National Historic Landmark in 1976, and a Mississippi Landmark in 2003.

== Description and history ==
The I.T. Montgomery House is located in an residential area south of the Mound Bayou town center, on the west side of South Main Avenue midway between Green Street West and West South Street. It is a two-story brick building, with a hip roof and an elevated brick foundation. It has a single-story porch extending across its front, with a hip roof supported by sloped square Doric columns set on brick piers. The porch is reached by a long stair with a right-angle turn. Sections project from several of the house's sides, capped by gables with deep eaves.

Isaiah Thomas Montgomery was a leading figure in the founding of Mound Bayou, one of Mississippi's most successful communities established by slaves freed by the American Civil War. He and a cousin, both former slaves from the plantation of Confederate President Jefferson Davis, had been part of an unsuccessful attempt to establish such a community at one corner of Davis's plantation. After a railroad line was built through Bolivar County in the 1880s, this land, granted to the railroad, was considered a more suitable site for such a settlement. Montgomery was instrumental in recruiting settlers and helping to build the new community, which was given a town charter by the state in 1912. This house was built for Montgomery in 1910, and was his home until his death.

After Montgomery's death in 1924, the home was used as a private residence; and later used by nurses, and teachers.

== See also ==
- List of National Historic Landmarks in Mississippi
- National Register of Historic Places listings in Bolivar County, Mississippi
