= International Order of Twelve Knights and Daughters of Tabor =

African American fraternal organization

- IOT
- Founded: 1872; 154 years ago Independence, Missouri, US
- Type: Fraternal order
- Affiliation: Independent
- Status: Active
- Emphasis: African American
- Scope: Local (previously international)
- Motto: In Solo Deo Salus "In God Alone is Safety"
- Pillars: Justice, Equity, Benevolence, Prudence, Loyalty, Unity, and Impartiality
- Colors: Red, Black and Green
- Publication: The Taborian
- Philanthropy: Taborian Hospital
- Chapters: 1 active
- Headquarters: Mound Bayou, Mississippi; United States

The International Order of Twelve Knights and Daughters of Tabor (IOT) is an international co-ed African American fraternal organization best known as the sponsor of the Taborian Hospital.

== History ==
The International Order of Twelve Knights and Daughters of Tabor was founded by Moses Dickson, an abolitionist, soldier, and clergyman of the African Methodist Episcopal Church, as the International Order of Twelve in 1846 as an antislavery society.

The Order was re-organized in 1872 as a general fraternal organization in Independence, Missouri. It was a benevolence and financial aid group, providing death and sickness benefits to members. In the 1890s, the group claimed to have 100,000 members in thirty US states, the West Indies, England and Africa.

Though the organization was co-ed, men and women met separately locally. Men's lodges were called Temples and women's lodges were Tabernacles. The men were called Knights and the women Daughters. There were also juvenile lodges called Tents. Male and female junior members were known as Pages of Honor and Maid, respectively.

The relationship between the Taborians and another group, the Princes and Princesses of the Royal House of Media, who met in Palatiums for social and literary purposes is unclear.

In 1915, the Order was involved in a widely publicized lawsuit in Texas. A man named Smith Johnson tripped and fell during his initiation, causing a sword to enter his body. The Order claimed that the ritual did not specify the use of a sword by the participating officer and that the individual should be held accountable for the accident. The case went up to the Texas Supreme Court, which favored the plaintiff and ordered the Order to pay him the $12,000 awarded by a lower court.

As of 2017, the coed fraternity operates as a 501(c)3 non-profit organization that works on revitalization and renovation projects in Mound Bayou, Mississippi.

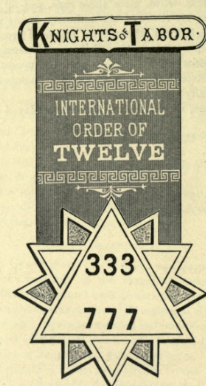
Badge of the International Order of Twelve Knights and Daughters of Tabor, 1891

== Symbols ==
The name Knights and Daughters of Tabor refers to Mount Tabor in Israel. Mount Tabor is a significant locations in the Bible's Book of Judges, the source of the fraternity's ritual. The fraternity's motto is In Solo Deo Salus or "In God Alone is Safety".

The fraternity's badge is a silver twelve-pointed star with the numbers 333 and 777, attached to a scarlet ribbon bearing the name, "International Order of Twelve". The numbers were selected for their significance to the Bible. The number 777 also symbolizes "the triple perfection of the International Order of Twelve, founded upon the solid principles of justice, equity, benevolence, prudence, loyalty, unity, and impartiality." Other badges exist for various officers.

The fraternity's colors are red, black, and green. Red symbolizes the blood of Jesus, black represents death and green stands for eternity.

Its print publication was The Taborian.

== Taborian Hospital ==
After years of decline, membership surged after 1938, when Perry M. Smith, the Chief Grand Mentor, persuaded the Mississippi Jurisdiction of the order to build a hospital in the all-black town of Mound Bayou, Mississippi. To pay for it, each member paid an annual assessment into a hospital fund. In addition, Smith visited sharecroppers and tenants on plantations throughout Mississippi to raise funds. The Mississippi Jurisdiction owned and operated the hospital from 1942 to 1966. The Taborian Hospital merged with the Sarah Brown Hospital, becoming the Mound Bayou Community Hospital in 1966. It closed in 1983.

== Notable members ==
- Minnie L. Fisher, civic worker and community activist
- A.C. Jackson, surgeon
- Scipio Africanus Jones, lawyer, judge, and Republican politician
- John Angelo Lester, physician

== See also ==
- List of general fraternities
- List of friendly and benefit societies
- List of North American ethnic and religious fraternal orders
