= Financial crisis of 1914 =

European selloff of American securities following the outbreak of WWI

The financial crisis of 1914 was a financial crisis resulting from the sell-off of about $3 billion (equivalent to $96 billion in 2025) of foreign portfolio investments, primarily by the British who needed funds for the war effort, during the July Crisis at the start of World War I. It led to the U.S. stock market being closed for four months and the London stock market for five months. It also marked a change in the international economic order whereby the U.S. became a leader in the global financial markets. The financial crisis is relatively unknown since it was overshadowed by the concurrent political crisis.

== Events ==
The assassination of Archduke Franz Ferdinand occurred on June 28, 1914. War appeared unavoidable after the Ultimatum of July 23, 1914. Between that date and July 27, 1914, banks in London called in their loans, hoarded gold, and withdrew funding; shipments of gold from the U.S. to Europe reached a record high as Europeans exchanged dollars for gold and the pound sterling surged in value on increased demand to repay British loans. Austria-Hungary declared war on Serbia on July 28, 1914, starting World War I.

=== Response in United States ===
With the Federal Reserve in its infancy, the response to the crisis in the United States was led by United States Secretary of the Treasury William Gibbs McAdoo. Although the values of both the dollar and the pound sterling were both pegged to gold and thus normally did not fluctuate much, as the value of the pound sterling rose from $4.87 to $6.75; some believed that U.S. would be forced to abandon the gold standard. On July 30, 1914, McAdoo distributed gold to Treasury offices to protect the dollar and maintain the gold standard. On July 31, 1914, after several days of sell offs, McAdoo closed the New York Stock Exchange for four months to prevent the sale of American securities by the British. On August 3, McAdoo increased the supply of paper money to avoid a run on the banks that would force them to suspend deposit convertibility, as they had in the Panic of 1907. On August 4, 1914, the United States Congress passed a bill allowing banks to issue currency at up to 125% of capital. Ocean traffic was disorganized because of the danger of attacks by submarines and the absence of insurance; consequently, supplies of grain and food for export built up at ports and an embargo on further deliveries by railroads was implemented. At a meeting with business leaders on August 14, 1914, McAdoo organized ships to transport the supplies; he then pushed for the passage of the War Risk Insurance Act. McAdoo also used the Aldrich-Vreeland Act to allow banks to issue national bank notes without the required collateral of U.S. government bonds. On September 4, 1914, in partnership with Wall Street banks, McAdoo led a U.S. Treasury-subsidized bailout of New York City, which he deemed too big to fail; the city neared bankruptcy because its debts to the British government were denominated in appreciating pound sterling. On November 11, 1914, the dollar no longer traded at a discount, marking the day when the U.S. emerged as a financial leader. By January 1915, countries visited New York City, instead of London, to raise capital.

=== Response in United Kingdom ===
The response to the crisis in the United Kingdom was led by David Lloyd George, then Chancellor of the Exchequer. The Bank of England raised the bank rate from 3% to 4% on July 30, to 8% on July 31, and then to 10% on August 1. It then became the lender of last resort. Fearing defaults by institutions in France, Germany, and Italy, the Bank of England bought financial assets held by banks which had plunged in value, while the UK government agreed to provide guarantees against any losses incurred by the Bank of England. The The British declared war on Germany on August 4, 1914. The following day, the Currency and Bank Notes Act 1914 was implemented, suspending the gold standard in the UK, with the expectation that it would be reinstated after the war. In August 1914, the Treasury printed a large supply of new currency (the notes were signed by Sir John Bradbury, 1st Baron Bradbury, Permanent Secretary to the Treasury and known as "Bradbury Notes"), increasing the money supply. The monetary base was expanded from £288 million in 1914 to £531 million in 1918, leading to inflation. Taxes on property, personal income, and business income were raised significantly. Defense spending rose from 3.1% of GDP in the 1912–1913 fiscal year to 14.9% of GDP in the 1914–1915 fiscal year, while spending on education, transportation, and other civilian services was reduced. Government deficits and debts reached unprecedented levels.

=== International developments and reopening ===
Most international stock markets closed for an extended period beginning on August 1. Many major economies declared a moratorium on all required payments of negotiable instruments. The State Bank of the Russian Empire suspended payments in gold on July 27, 1914, the Reichsbank did so on August 4, 1914, and the Bank of France did so on August 5, 1914.

On November 28, 1914, the New York Stock Exchange reopened for bond trading only, and on December 12, 1914, it reopened for stock trading; on that day, the Dow Jones Industrial Average fell 24.39% (when calculated retroactively based on the 20 components in 1916), from 71 to 54, its worst drop since inception. However, when calculated using the 12 components actually in the index on that day, the index rose when it reopened. While the stock market did recover later that year by any calculations, it fell 40% between late 1916 and early 1917.

The London Stock Exchange reopened on January 4, 1915 but the international economic order had changed.
