= Taborian Hospital =

- U.S. National Register of Historic Places
- Location within Mississippi Location within the United States
- Location: US 61, jct. of McGinnis St., Mound Bayou, Mississippi
- Coordinates: 33°52′48″N 90°43′36″W
- Area: 2.1 acres (0.85 ha)
- Built: 1942
- Architect: McKissack & McKissack
- Architectural style: Art Deco
- NRHP reference No.: 96000827
- Added to NRHP: August 1, 1996

Taborian Hospital is a former hospital in Mound Bayou, Mississippi, U.S. It opened in 1942 to great fanfare by the International Order of Twelve Knights and Daughters of Tabor. Everyone on the staff, including doctors and nurses, was Black. The facilities included two major operating rooms, an x-ray machine, incubators, electrocardiograph, blood bank, and laboratory. Operating costs came almost entirely from membership dues and other voluntary contributions.

== History ==
The first chief surgeon of the hospital was T. R. M. Howard, who later became an important civil rights leader in Mississippi and mentor to both Medgar Evers and Fannie Lou Hamer, who was often a patient at the hospital.

After years of financial pressure, the hospital lost its fraternal status in 1967 when the federal government took it over and put it under the authority of the Office of Economic Opportunity. The hospital, renamed as the Mound Bayou Community Hospital, finally closed in 1983.

During the 1990s, the Knights and Daughters of Tabor began a continuing campaign to renovate the original hospital building which has been empty for many years.

In 2011, work began to restore the hospital and create a regional medical center. When completed, half of the building will serve as an urgent care facility, which will utilize telemedicine in collaboration with the University of Mississippi Medical Center. During construction, effort will be placed on maintaining the historic integrity of the building.
