= Isaiah Montgomery =

American community leader, politician (1847–1924)

Isaiah Thornton Montgomery
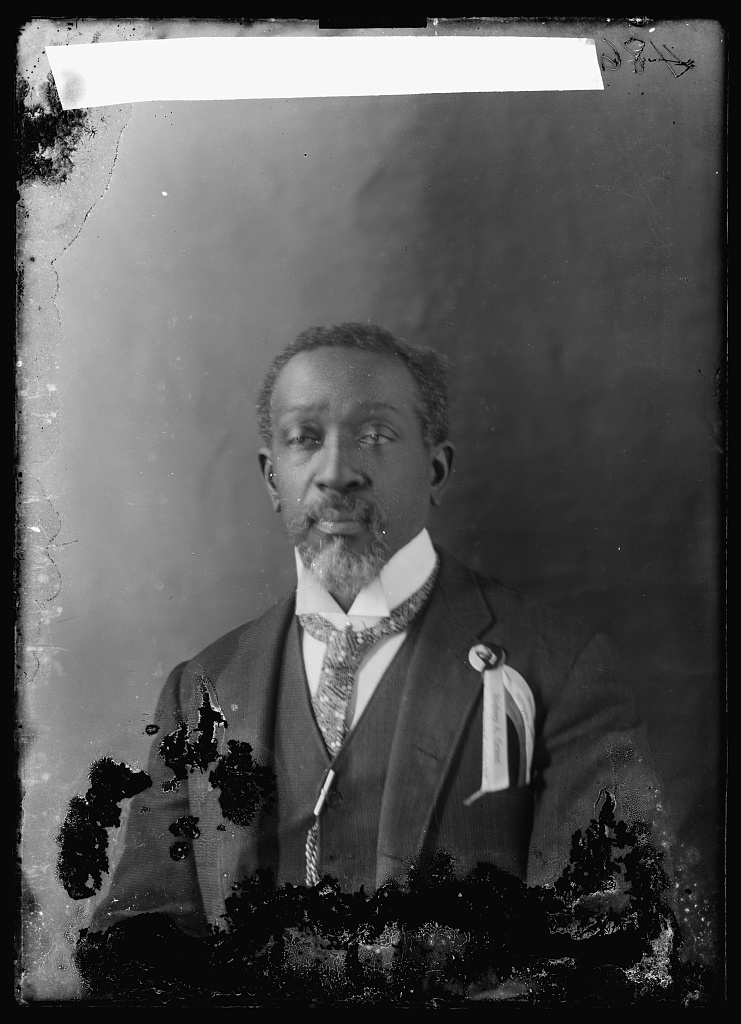

Mayor of Mound Bayou
- In office 1888–1902

Personal details
- Born: May 21, 1847 Davis Island, Mississippi, U.S.
- Died: March 5, 1924 (aged 76) Mound Bayou, Mississippi, U.S.
- Party: Republican
- Spouse: Martha Robb
- Relations: Ben Montgomery (father), William Montgomery (brother), Eugene P. Booze (son-in-law)
- Children: 11, including Mary Cordelia Montgomery Booze and Estella Montgomery
- Occupation: Community leader, politician, mayor, founder of city

Isaiah Thornton Montgomery (May 21, 1847 – March 5, 1924) was an American community leader, politician, and the founder of Mound Bayou, Mississippi, an all-black community. He was a Republican delegate to the 1890 Mississippi Constitutional Convention, and served as the mayor of Mound Bayou.

He participated in the 1890 Mississippi constitutional convention as a delegate from Bolivar County and voted for the adoption of a state constitution that included the utilization of poll taxes and literacy tests to maintain general standards, at that time, for voter registration. Montgomery promoted an accommodationist position for African Americans. The I. T. Montgomery House in Mound Bayou is a National Landmark.

He has been described as "Mississippi's Booker T. Washington". He is also known as I. T. Montgomery, and Isaiah Montgomery.

== Early life and education ==
Isaiah Thornton Montgomery was born on May 21, 1847, in Davis Island, Mississippi. He was born into slavery, the son of Mary Lewis Montgomery and Ben Montgomery, whom was enslaved by Joseph Emory Davis at Hurricane Plantation at Davis Bend. They had a second son, William Thornton Montgomery. His father Ben had been promoted to overseer of the property. The Montgomery children learned to read and write due to their father's influential position on the Hurricane Plantation at Davis Bend; and because Davis wanted to establish a more positive working environment for slaves and encouraged education.

Montgomery married Martha Robb; they had 11 children and their daughter Mary Cordelia Montgomery Booze was a political organizer.

== Career ==
Following the end of the American Civil War, Montgomery began a business with his father. It lasted until his fathers death in 1877. His father had long dreamed of establishing an independent black colony; by the time of his death, the Reconstruction era had ended and African Americans struggled to maintain themselves against white supremacists.

After his father's death in 1877, Montgomery worked to realize his father's dream. With his cousin Benjamin T. Green, he bought property in 1887 in the northwest frontier of Mississippi Delta bottomlands to found Mound Bayou. Bolivar County was the largest in area in the Delta. As farmers cleared land, they started cultivating cotton. Montgomery worked to gain freedmen protection of the law, and to keep their work and lives separate from supervision by whites.

Montgomery and Green donated land for the creation of the campus for Mound Bayou Normal Institute in 1887.

Montgomery attended Mississippi's 1890 constitutional convention as its only black or Republican delegate. Convened in Jackson in August, the convention drafted a new constitution which was designed to secure white domination of state politics, including the adoption of an "understanding clause" which required any prospective voter to be able to read and interpret any section of the state constitution. With little ability to challenge it, Montgomery accepted the clause, arguing that while it was "apparently one of unfriendliness" to blacks it was in the public interest to prevent illiterates from voting.

In what the Washington Post termed "A Notable Address Delivered by the Colored Statesman," Frederick Douglass gave a speech in October 1890 before the Bethel Literary and Historical Society of Washington, D.C.'s Metropolitan African Methodist Episcopal Church. He strongly condemned Montgomery's stance regarding suffrage in Mississippi. Douglass had spoken of Montgomery numerous times before and on the occasion cited his position as an act of "treason, to the cause of the colored people, not only of his own state, but of the United States," referring to the effect Montgomery's act would have in other states. He also lamented having heard in Montgomery "a groan of bitter anguish born of oppression and despair" and a voice of a "soul from which all hope had vanished."

Nevertheless, Douglass had great respect for Montgomery’s integrity and did not minimize the tremendous pressures he faced. “Such a man,” he declared, “is not to be dismissed by calling him a traitor, nor a self-seeking hypocrite for he is neither the one nor the other...Like a general on the field of battle, he has retreated when he could no longer fight and has surrendered a post which he thought he could no longer successfully defend.”

Although Montgomery resigned as the first mayor in 1902, he continued to be a key leader in the community. In this capacity, he went to New York and Washington, D.C. to recruit wealthy white investors of the Mound Bayou [Cotton] Oil Mill, Montgomery. He worked closely with Booker T. Washington in this effort to persuade Julius Rosenwald, the president and chair of the board of Sears-Robuck, to subscribe to 25,000 dollars in bonds. The black press described the Mill as “the largest thing of the kind ever undertaken by Negro people."

Montgomery, along with his daughter Mary Booze and son-in-law Eugene Booze, was an important figure in the black-controlled Republican Party of Mississippi. In 1921, for example, Montgomery attended (and was promoted as the "inspirational spirit" of) a meeting of the executive committee of the GOP Third Congressional District of Mississippi (an area which included Mound Bayou). The meeting applauded President Warren G. Harding’s endorsement of the Dyer Bill to “curb the lynching and burning of human beings." Taking this stand in Mississippi carried some risk. For example, one of the states U.S. senators, Pat Harrison, was a leader of a tightly coordinated” successful Democratic filibuster which ultimately killed the Dyer Bill after it had prevailed in the House.

== Legacy ==
The I. T. Montgomery Elementary School of the North Bolivar Consolidated School District (formerly the Mound Bayou School District) is named after Montgomery.

== Works cited ==
- Hermann, Janet Sharp (1981). The Pursuit of a Dream (1st ed.). New York: Oxford University Press. ISBN 9780195028874.
- Krane, Dale; Shaffer, Stephen D. (1992). Mississippi Government and Politics: Modernizers Versus Traditionalists. University of Nebraska Press. ISBN 9780803277588.
