= Interstate 59 in Mississippi =

Interstate Highway in Mississippi, United States

Interstate 59
- I-59 highlighted in red

Route information
- Maintained by MDOT
- Length: 171.72 mi (276.36 km)
- Existed: August 14, 1957–present
- History: Completed August 29, 1968
- NHS: Entire route

Major junctions
- South end: I-59 / US 11 at the Louisiana state line south of Nicholson
- US 11 (multiple times); US 98 in Hattiesburg; US 49 in Hattiesburg; US 84 in Laurel; I-20 / US 80 in Meridian
- North end: I-20 / I-59 at the Alabama state line near Kewanee

Location
- Country: United States
- State: Mississippi
- Counties: Pearl River, Lamar, Forrest, Jones, Jasper, Clarke, Lauderdale

Highway system
- Interstate Highway System; Main; Auxiliary; Suffixed; Business; Future; Mississippi State Highway System; Interstate; US; State
← MS 57	→ US 61

Interstate 59 (I-59) is a part of the Interstate Highway System that runs 445.23 miles (716.53 km) from Slidell, Louisiana, to just outside of Wildwood, Georgia. In the U.S. state of Mississippi, I-59 travels 171.72 miles (276.36 km) from the Louisiana state line south of Nicholson northward to the Alabama state line northeast of the city of Meridian. Other cities it connects to include Picayune, Hattiesburg, and Laurel. Outside of these cities, however, I-59 is a largely rural road, providing access to other civilized areas via U.S. and state highways. Continuing from Louisiana, I-59 parallels and even shares a few concurrencies with the older U.S. Route 11 (US 11) corridor for its entire route, and it has largely supplanted that route as a major highway for long-haul traffic. At Meridian, I-59 meets I-20, and the two routes are cosigned for the remainder of their length through the state.

Of the four states which I-59 passes through, the segment in Mississippi is the second-longest. I-59 was signed into the Interstate Highway System in 1960, with the first segment of it being a small section from the Louisiana state line to Picayune, then from Hattiesburg to Laurel, built in 1963. Unfinished segments of the highway were later completed through incremental extensions and bids, and the highway was entirely finished by 1968.

== Route description ==
=== Louisiana to Laurel ===
I-59, along with US 11, enters Pearl River County, Mississippi, from St. Tammany Parish, Louisiana, southeast of Nicholson across the Pearl River. As the highway proceeds north, US 11 immediately splits from I-59 at the northern terminus of MS 607 to head northwest through the central portion of town while I-59 continues northeast and passes a truck weigh station. Approximately 1.25 miles (2.01 km) after the weigh station, I-59 reaches a rest area accessible from northbound. Shortly after, it enters Picayune where it has an interchange with MS 43, which serves the downtown area. MS 43 shares a brief concurrency with I-59, about two miles (3.2 km) as the route crosses Hobolochitto Creek, before splitting off at the next interchange for North Picayune. I-59 continues on its own through wooded areas and skirts around the community of Hide-A-Way Lake as well as the shoreline of Lake Hide-A-Way as it encounters a closed rest area on the northbound side. The Interstate then comes within close proximity of Anchor Lake as the southbound lanes also have another closed rest area. I-59 then continues on for another 10 miles (16 km) as it intersects MS 53 for Poplarville. Bypassing the city to the east, I-59 then has an interchange with MS 26, also serving Poplarville, two miles (3.2 km) later. As I-59 continues through rural areas, it approaches a wildlife area to the east and crosses the Wolf River. It proceeds for another six miles (9.7 km) before passing nearby a lake and crossing the Red Creek. Reaching Lumberton, I-59 has an interchange with MS 13 for the city's main district, bypassing it to the east. Curving slightly northward, the Interstate next crosses two small creeks before entering Lamar County and reaching an interchange with MS 589 for Purvis.

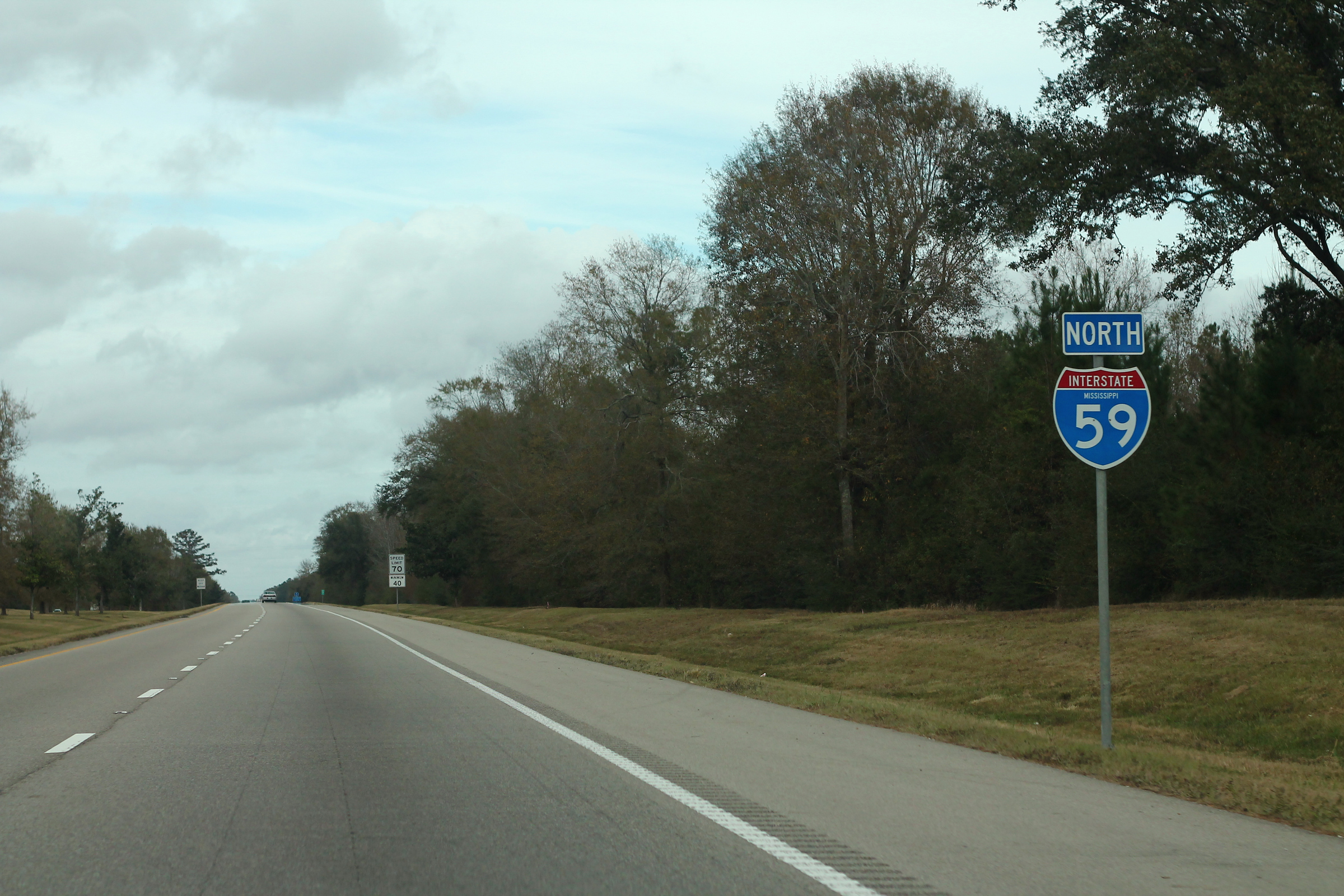
I-59 northbound after its split with MS 43

Crossing the Black Creek and into Forrest County some distance later, I-59 makes a slight turn northeast and approaches another rest area yet again accessible northbound, while a parking area is accessible southbound. I-59 reaches Hattiesburg as it makes a turn to the north and meets US 98. The two highways curve northwest and meet US 11 at another interchange, and then the highway enters Lamar County once again. I-59/US 98 begins entering the commercial developments of Hattiesburg, and at milepost 65, the Interstate splits from US 98 at a partial cloverleaf interchange (parclo), which heads west along Hardy Street for Columbia. I-59 heads in a relatively straight northward direction for a short distance before entering Forrest County again and turning northeast to meet US 49 and MS 42 at a cloverleaf interchange. MS 42 begins a concurrency with I-59, and the highway proceeds northeast and crosses the Bouie River. It enters rural areas once more and splits from MS 42 at milepost 69. I-59 turns back north and enters Jones County, where it continues through forest and has an exit for the Hattiesburg–Laurel Regional Airport at milepost 76. Shortly thereafter, it turns northeast and crosses the Leaf River, then turns a bit north and parallels US 11 again. The Interstate has its next interchange with MS 590 near Ellisville and very briefly parallels it before MS 590 turns eastward. I-59 bypasses Ellisville to the northwest and has an interchange with MS 29 and MS 588 (Hill Street) for the town's main district. Turning in a nearly eastward direction, I-59 then bridges the Tallahoma Creek and reaches its next interchange with US 11 at milepost 90. The Interstate curves northward and meets US 11 shortly after once more, immediately turning completely east after entering Laurel and meeting US 84 and MS 15 at a parclo interchange. These two routes form another concurrency with I-59 and the three highways proceed through the city center.

=== Laurel to Alabama ===
The highway continues in a perfectly eastward direction south of Laurel, meeting US 11 shortly after the concurrency with US 84/MS 15 begins. The Interstate begins to turn northeast slightly as MS 15 leaves I-59/US 84 via Cook Avenue. The highway turns entirely north and cuts around the shoreline of a nearby lake as US 84 also exits off of I-59 at the east side of town on Chantilly Street in a parclo interchange. I-59 turns northeast again and crosses over the Tallahala Creek before meeting US 11 at a single-point urban interchange. The surroundings return to wilderness as the freeway slants north and bypasses Sandersville to the west. The Interstate has a parking area on the northbound lanes and then one on the southbound lanes as it continues to head north. It then enters Jasper County and slants northeast yet again at an interchange with MS 528 before proceeding through more rural areas and bridging the Castaffa Creek. Next, it passes over the Shubuta Creek before gently making a curve northward and crossing the Pachuta Creek, then enters Clarke County. Its first interchange within the county is with MS 18 serving Pachuta to the southeast as it slides northeast, then north before making another cross over the Chicwillasaw Creek. It turns northeast to bridge the Souenlovie Creek and begins paralleling a smaller road to the west of it. At milepost 134, MS 513 branches off to the east for Enterprise. I-59 turns northward and the surroundings remain forested as it enters its final county in the state, Lauderdale County.

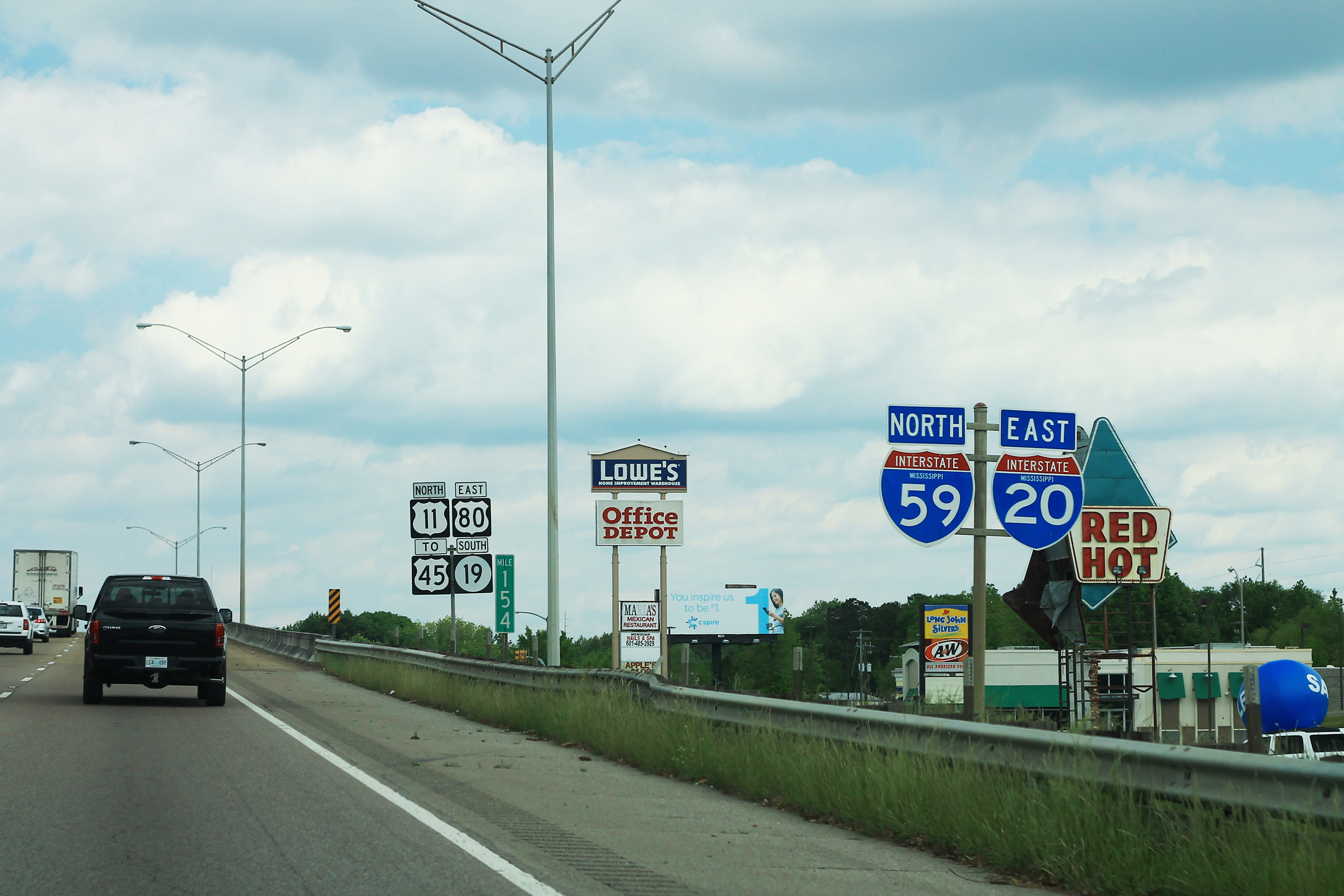
I-20 eastbound/I-59 northbound and three other concurrent routes in downtown Meridian

Immediately upon entering the county, I-59 crosses the Chunky River. It proceeds northeast through more wooded areas for the next eight miles (13 km) before reaching the large interchange with I-20 and US 80 right outside of Meridian. From here, the exit numbers continue to follow I-59 as it merges with I-20 and US 80 for a concurrency. Eastward, the highway crosses the Okatibbee Creek and has an interchange with US 11 and MS 19 for the Meridian Regional Airport as it approaches the city. US 11 and MS 19 both converge with I-20/I-59/US 80 as the highway proceeds underneath the Meridian Southern Railway. Through the city center, the highway turns slightly northeast and intersects with MS 145 and MS 493 (22nd Avenue) at a parclo interchange for Quitman. From this interchange, the highway parallels a nearby frontage road on both the southbound and northbound directions before the next interchange, where US 11/US 80/MS 19 all split off while I-20 remains connected with I-59. The highway continues on fully eastward and encounters a cloverleaf interchange with US 45 heading south of Russell before proceeding into rural areas yet again with the southbound lanes having a welcome center for travelers coming into the state. I-20/I-59 crosses the Toomsuba Creek south of Toomsuba before curving northeast. The last major interchange I-20/I-59 has is a parclo interchange with US 80 before reaching a truck weigh station on both sides of the highway and crossing the state line into Sumter County, Alabama.

== History ==
=== Predecessor highways ===
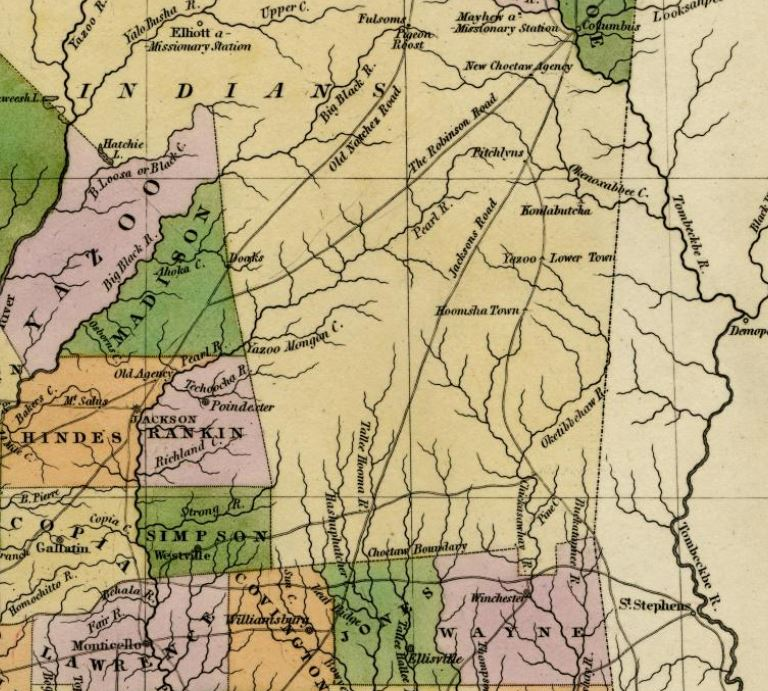
An 1828 map showing the routing of Jackson's Military Road in Mississippi

The highway of which would become I-59 initially existed as a road running from New Orleans, Louisiana, to Nashville, Tennessee, along a 19th-century route, known as Jackson's Military Road, or simply Jackson Military Road, built over 200 years ago. Concluding the Battle of New Orleans in 1815, general (later president) Andrew Jackson proposed two easy routes for military officers to travel. One route was an east-west road running between Fort Benjamin Hawkins in Georgia to Fort Stoddert on the Tombigbee River south of Mobile, Alabama. The other route was between Nashville and New Orleans. Jackson was selected by the U.S. War Department to appoint an engineer as well as receive building equipment by April 27, 1816, and Congress appropriated $10,000 for the initial construction. With a final cost of approximately $300,000, the Military Road was built by over 300 soldiers and covered a distance of about 392 miles (631 km). Along this entire route, over 35 bridges with a length from 60 feet (18 m) to as much as 300 feet (91 m) with an additional 20,000 feet (6,100 m) of causeway were laid across the marshland of the state, while the road had an estimated width of only 40 feet (12 m).

On July 30, Jackson announced to Congress that the survey line from Columbia, Tennessee, to Madisonville, Louisiana, part of the Nashville-to-New Orleans link, was close to completion. On May 17, 1820, the road was opened. Pioneers made their way through the unpaved road via foot, horseback, or wagon, some of the few methods of transportation. Trips were guaranteed to take several days, and historians raised comments that the road built by engineers and the soldiers closely paralleled the Interstate Highway of today, I-59. Although the road was one of the most used during the 1820s era, by the mid 1830s, it was nearly abandoned completely south of Columbus. This was mainly due to the fact that the road was rather underutilized in the later eras and it did not serve many important population centers along its route. Despite this, I-59, which was built more than a century after, solved most of the road's problems and proved to be a success, as since its construction, it presently serves as a major hub and a faster alternative to the older U.S. Route 11 for long-distance travelers.

=== Planning and construction ===
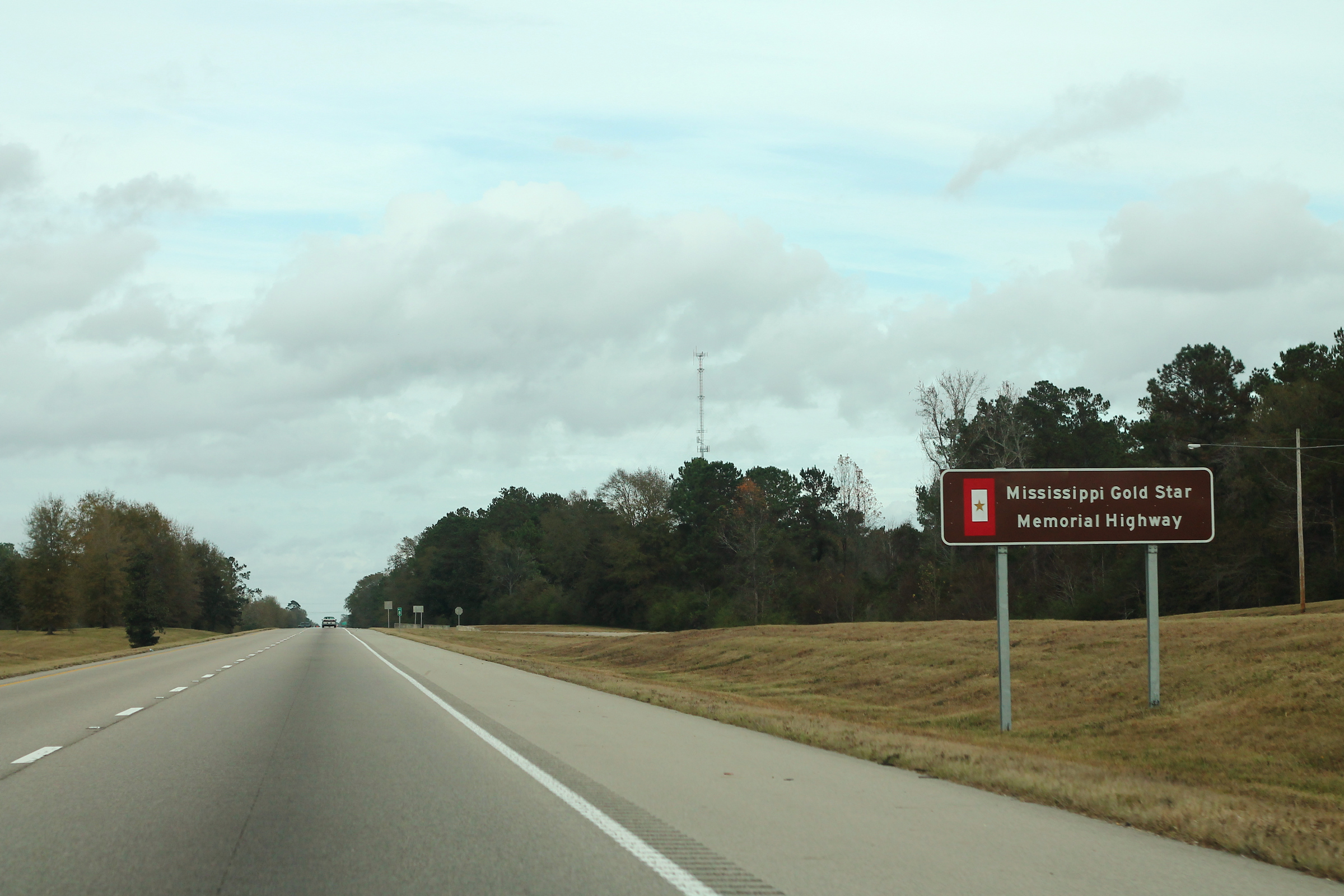
I-59 designated as the "Gold Star Memorial Highway"

I-59 was not part of the plans in the Federal-Aid Highway Act of 1956, which created the Interstate Highways around the nation; however, in route logs as early as 1957, it was part of a series of contracts awarded by the Mississippi Department of Transportation (MDOT), which included a total of 543 miles (874 km) of road for work, or approximately $46,800,000 in value. However, while the contractors had completed 356 miles (573 km), which was more than half of the awarded miles by the department, adverse weather conditions brought severe weather such as heavy rain and freezing, which delayed the amount of miles by 35 percent, as discussed by director T. C. Robbins. I-59 was one of four Interstate Highways planned to be built in the state, of which the entire mileage of all highways would total 691 miles (1,112 km). As it was one of four highways along with I-10, I-20, and I-55, MDOT chose the selected route that I-59 would supplant, and that was US 11, serving as a major route through the state. This continued into 1958, where 133.3 miles (214.5 km) of Interstate Highways were under construction. Despite the adverse weather conditions and what the highway officials considered "the worst construction weather in the history of the Mississippi Highway department", the state pushed to finish building the Interstate Highways to stretch throughout the entire state. All of the highways were planned to have at least four lanes, with construction planned to continue until around 1969, with an estimated cost of $440 million. The present route of I-59 roughly matches what it was proposed to go through, from Hattiesburg to join I-20 at Meridian, though the length was slightly shorter than what was stated, at 147 miles (237 km) instead of 171 miles (275 km) like what its length actually was.

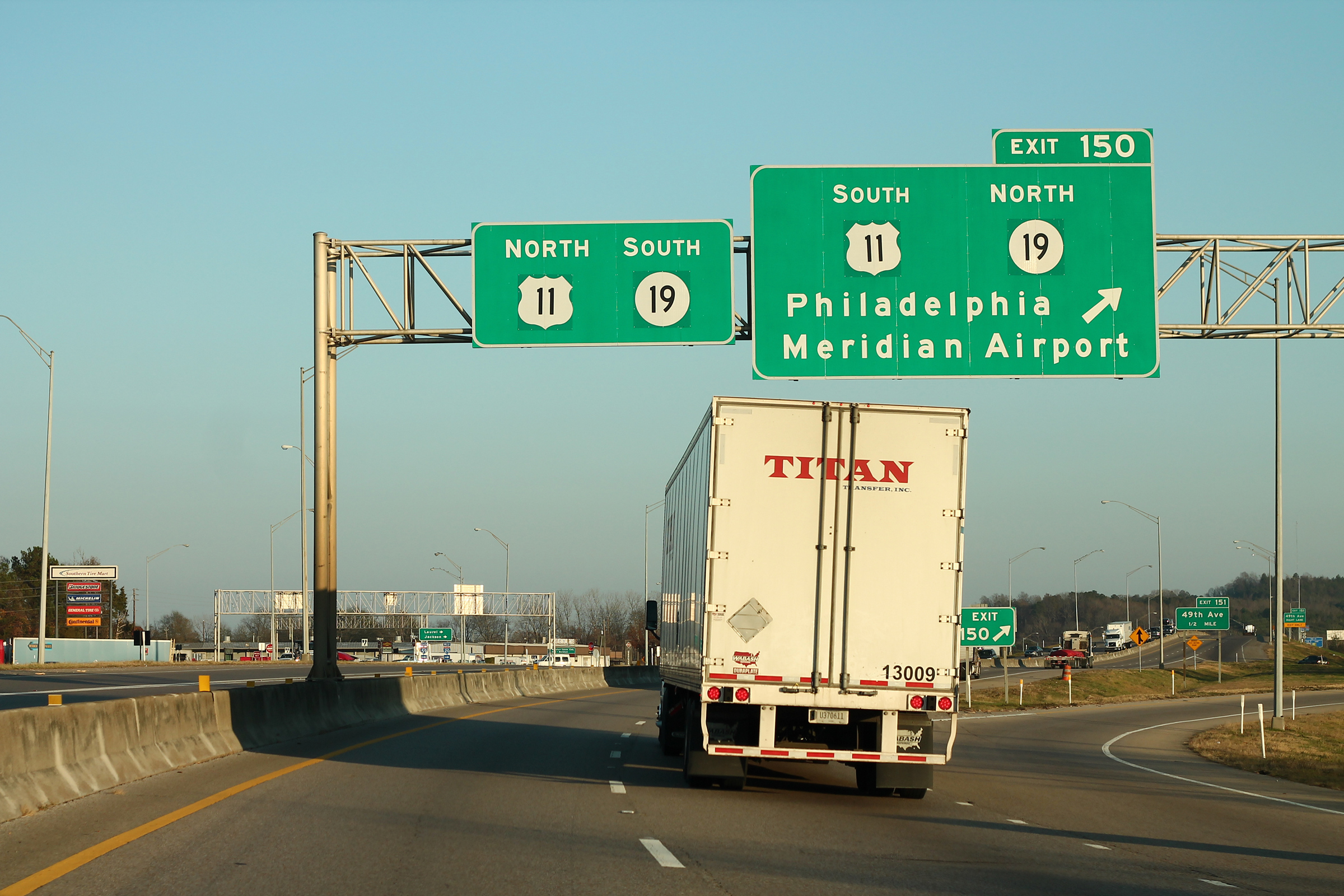
I-20/I-59/US 80 concurrent with US 11/MS 19 in Meridian. I-20/I-59/US 80 are not shown on this sign, however.

In 1959, MDOT considered that the year would be one of the biggest for highway construction. Robbins stated that work was underway for more than $72 million and the department would presumably award contracts for another $52 million. For I-59, work was underway in an "advanced state" in the city of Laurel as well as varying stages from Laurel to Hattiesburg and the remainder of Forrest County. The department was projected to complete the roadway through Laurel as well as let grading and draining contracts from the Forrest-Lamar county line into Lamar County wholly. On May 27 of that year, work began on construction of 6.5 miles (10.5 km) of road between Purvis and the Forrest-Lamar county line. At an estimated bid cost of $1,142,371.95, this job included grading, drainage, culverts, a one-box bridge with incidental bases, double bituminous surface treatment, and eight-inch (20 cm) reinforced cement concrete pavement for the interchanges. Two miles (3.2 km) of the Interstate had been opened in Laurel and a contract would be let in October in order to pave three miles (4.8 km) of more roadway. The highway from Laurel to the Forrest-Lamar county line was presumed to be under contract for paving by the middle of 1960. Additionally, work was still progressing on three interchanges within Hattiesburg, and the total cost for the entire project was $2.5 million. By 1960, I-59 had another 3.8 miles (6.1 km) of grading, drainage, and paving scheduled for completion in Laurel. On July 25, 1961, the State Highway Commission accepted bids for a paving project along I-59, as it was authorized to begin paving another section of it between Purvis and Hattiesburg. Signs were to be placed along the Interstate in this segment, which ran a total distance of approximately 32.5 miles (52.3 km), with the paving from Laurel to Hattiesburg already under contract.

The dedication for the Laurel-to-Hattiesburg segment of I-59 occurred on November 15, 1962, after 33 miles (53 km) of the newly paved segment between Purvis and Hattiesburg was completed. Governor Ross Barnett and many other government officials took part in the ceremony, with lunch being served directly on the highway. In addition to this portion of I-59, construction was still progressing on the segment south of Hattiesburg to the Louisiana state line, as well as the segment from Meridian to the Alabama state line. These portions were planned to be completed by the next summer. On October 22, 1963, the Mississippi Highway Department awarded two contracts for $8 million on I-55 and I-59, respectively. 13.69 miles (22.03 km) between Picayune and Poplarville went for $3,295,424. Another contract for 7.09 miles (11.41 km) of grading and surfacing went out between the Jones and Jasper county line. Lastly, 14.14 miles (22.76 km) of the concurrency between I-20/I-59 between Meridian and Kewanee were let to contract at $30,301. By March 24, 1964, a $9.5 million bid on construction of I-59 between Meridian and the Louisiana line were let. The two projects were located in Clarke and Lauderdale counties. Upon being under contract, the two projects would be one continuous route from the I-20 interchange to Laurel, and Hattiesburg to the Louisiana state line; 40 miles (64 km) between Laurel and Hattiesburg as well as 15 miles (24 km) between Meridian and the Alabama state line. In Lauderdale County, the project advertised for the letting included building 8.3 miles (13.4 km) of roadway and bridges, and in Clarke County, the project was 6.4 miles (10.3 km) of roadway and bridges as well.

In 1965, as warmer weather arose on the horizon, engineers and contractors resumed work on I-59 in southern Mississippi between McNeill and Nicholson within about one month, with contracts scheduled to bid at $4,487,000. This project, as announced by the contractor, T. L. James and Co. Inc, was in the process of setting up a material plant east of Carriere, and the project would commence on April 1. The McNeill-Nicholson project would complete surfacing of I-59 near Slidell to north of Laurel, with the Laurel-to-Poplarville segment being opened the fall before. This construction was finished on February 7, 1966, where 30 miles (48 km) more were opened, giving travelers 100 miles (160 km) of continuous pavement from north of Laurel to the south shore of Lake Pontchartrain. The dedication began with a ribbon-cutting that occurred in Picayune to open up the section that links Poplarville with Nicholson which was proposed the year prior. 13 contracts were let to construction in 1967, which included paving I-59 between Clarke County and Meridian. However, two of the contracts were not let due to the bids being too expensive. The I-59 project would allow paving and other work on 8.1 miles (13.0 km) in Lauderdale County, with the contract being received on a bid of $1,712,386. On August 29, 1968, a final 19-mile (31 km) stretch of I-59 between Enterprise and Meridian was opened, fully completing the Interstate and allowing drivers to travel from New Orleans to Meridian along a four-lane road.

=== Later history ===
At 4:00 pm on August 27, 2005, for the first time in its history, the southbound lanes of I-59 were temporarily redirected northward to accommodate evacuation for Hurricane Katrina. This was a previously agreed to joint plan by the states of Mississippi and Louisiana called contraflow lane reversal. The program began at the Louisiana–Mississippi state line and continued 21 miles (34 km) north to Poplarville.

A notoriously sharp S-curve, at milepost 96 in Laurel, was the subject of a large reconstruction project that began in 2006. Those sharp curves were the legacy of an overpass over the Southern Railway on a town bypass with design dating from before the Interstate Highways, and they featured a 40-mile-per-hour (64 km/h) speed limit, one of the lowest anywhere on the Interstate Highway System. This work was completed in 2009.

== Exit list ==
County	Location	mi	km	Exit	Destinations	Notes
Pearl River		0.0	0.0		I-59 south / US 11 south – Slidell, New Orleans	Continuation into Louisiana
Pearl River		0.5	0.80	1	US 11 north / MS 607 south – Nicholson, John C. Stennis Space Center	Northern end of US 11 concurrency; northern end of MS 607
Pearl River	Picayune	4.0	6.4	4	MS 43 south – Picayune, Kiln	Southern end of MS 43 concurrency
Pearl River	Picayune	6.0	9.7	6	MS 43 north – North Picayune	Northern end of MS 43 concurrency
Pearl River		10.5	16.9	10	Carriere	
Pearl River		14.9	24.0	15	McNeill	
Pearl River		19.5	31.4	19	Millard	
Pearl River		26.7	43.0	27	MS 53 – Necaise, Poplarville	
Pearl River		29.6	47.6	29	MS 26 – Poplarville, Wiggins	
Pearl River		35.4	57.0	35	Hillsdale Road	
Pearl River	Lumberton	41.1	66.1	41	MS 13 – Lumberton	
Lamar	Purvis	51.3	82.6	51	MS 589 – Purvis	
Forrest		58.6	94.3	59	US 98 east – Lucedale, Mobile	Southern end of US 98 concurrency
Forrest		60.5	97.4	60	US 11 – South Hattiesburg, Downtown Hattiesburg	
Lamar	Hattiesburg	64.8	104.3	65	US 98 west (MS 198 east) / Hardy Street – Columbia	Northern end of US 98 concurrency; signed as exits 65A (MS 198) and 65B (US 98) northbound
Forrest	Hattiesburg	67.4	108.5	67	US 49 / MS 42 west – Hattiesburg, Jackson	Southern end of MS 42 concurrency; signed as exits 67A (south) and 67B (north)
Forrest	Hattiesburg	69.6	112.0	69	MS 42 east (Evelyn Gandy Parkway) – Petal	Northern end of MS 42 concurrency
Forrest		73.1	117.6	73	Monroe Road	
Jones		75.6	121.7	76	Hattiesburg–Laurel Regional Airport	
Jones		78.0	125.5	78	Sanford Road	
Jones		80.3	129.2	80	Moselle	
Jones		85.6	137.8	85	MS 590 – Ellisville	
Jones	Ellisville	88.2	141.9	88	MS 29 / MS 588 – Ellisville	
Jones		90.3	145.3	90	US 11 (Ellisville Boulevard)	
Jones	Laurel	92.9	149.5	93	US 11 – South Laurel	
Jones	Laurel	94.5	152.1	95A–B	US 84 west / MS 15 north (16th Avenue)	Southern end of US 84/MS 15 concurrency; signed as exits 95A (south) and 95B (north)
Jones	Laurel	95.0	152.9	95C	Leontyne Price Boulevard	Formerly Beacon Street
Jones	Laurel	95.6	153.9	96A	4th Avenue / Masonite Road	
Jones	Laurel	96.0	154.5	96B	MS 15 south (Cook Avenue) – Richton	Northern end of MS 15 concurrency
Jones	Laurel	96.8	155.8	97	US 84 east (Chantilly Street) – Waynesboro	Northern end of US 84 concurrency
Jones	Laurel	98.6	158.7	99	US 11	
Jones		104.1	167.5	104	Sandersville	
Jasper		113.3	182.3	113	MS 528 – Heidelberg, Bay Springs	
Jasper		118.2	190.2	118	Vossburg, Paulding	
Clarke		125.9	202.6	126	MS 18 – Rose Hill, Pachuta	
Clarke		133.6	215.0	134	MS 513 – South Enterprise, Rose Hill	Rose Hill not on northbound sign
Clarke		136.8	220.2	137	North Enterprise	
Lauderdale		141.6	227.9	142	Savoy	
Lauderdale		147.9	238.0	149	I-20 west / US 80 west – Jackson	Southern end of I-20/US 80 concurrency
Lauderdale	Meridian	149.9	241.2	150	US 11 south / MS 19 north – Philadelphia, Meridian Airport	Southern end of US 11/MS 19 concurrency
Lauderdale	Meridian	150.5	242.2	151	James Chaney Drive	
Lauderdale	Meridian	151.4	243.7	152	29th Avenue	
Lauderdale	Meridian	152.8	245.9	153	MS 145 south / MS 493 north (22nd Avenue) – Quitman	
Lauderdale	Meridian	153.7	247.4	154	US 11 north / US 80 east / MS 19 south / MS 39 north – De Kalb, Butler	Northern end of US 11/US 80/MS 19 concurrency; signed as exits 154A (south) and 154B (north) northbound; northern end of MS 39
Lauderdale	Meridian	155.4	250.1	156	Jimmie Rodgers Parkway	
Lauderdale	Meridian	156.5	251.9	157	US 45 – Quitman, Macon	Signed as exits 157A (south) and 157B (north)
Lauderdale		160.0	257.5	160	Russell	
Lauderdale		164.6	264.9	165	Toomsuba	
Lauderdale		168.2	270.7	169	US 11 / US 80 – Kewanee	
Lauderdale		171.72	276.36		I-20 east / I-59 north – Tuscaloosa	Continuation into Alabama
1.000 mi = 1.609 km; 1.000 km = 0.621 mi: Concurrency terminus
