= U.S. Route 11 in Mississippi =

Section of U.S. Highway in Mississippi, United States

U.S. Highway 11
- US 11 highlighted in red

Route information
- Maintained by MDOT
- Length: 173.1 mi (278.6 km)
- Existed: 1926–present

Major junctions
- South end: I-59 / US 11 near Pearl River, LA
- US 49 / US 98 in Hattiesburg; US 84 in Laurel; I-20 / I-59 / US 80 in Meridian; US 45 in Meridian
- North end: US 11 / US 80 near Cuba, AL

Location
- Country: United States
- State: Mississippi
- Counties: Pearl River, Lamar, Forrest, Jones, Jasper, Clarke, Lauderdale

Highway system
- United States Numbered Highway System; List; Special; Divided; Mississippi State Highway System; Interstate; US; State
← I-10	→ MS 12

U.S. Highway 11 (US 11) is a major north–south United States Numbered Highway that runs from New Orleans, Louisiana, to Rouses Point, New York. In Mississippi, US 11 runs for approximately 170 miles (270 km) from near Nicholson to Cuba, Alabama. The Mississippi section of US 11 is defined in Mississippi Code Annotated § 65-3-3.

== Route description ==
Throughout the state of Mississippi, US 11 closely parallels Interstate 59 (I-59).

=== Pearl River County ===
US 11 enters the state of Mississippi along I-59. After a short distance, US 11 and I-59 interchange at exit 1 with Mississippi Highway 607 (MS 607), where MS 607 ends and US 11 takes over its northeastern alignment. US 11 heads to the northeast in the community of Nicholson, where it parallels the Norfolk Southern Railway tracks.

The highway progresses northward along with the railroad tracks. The three are connected soon after at an intersection with Section Line Road, which runs westbound from US 11. Several miles north of the interchange from I-59, I-59 begins to parallel once again to the far east. After a while, US 11 intersects with South Haugh Avenue. US 11 continues northward where the highway enters the city of Picayune.

A short distance into Picayune, US 11 intersects with a divided highway segment of MS 43. US 11 and the railroad tracks continue to the north and intersects with West and East Canal streets in the center of Picayune. After the intersection with East 4th Street, US 11 continues northeastward.

After a short distance, US 11 intersects with East Sycamore Road, an alignment of MS 43. North of MS 43, the highway continues northward, entering the community of Richardson. US 11 continues northward into the community of Ozona, paralleling an original alignment, which is signed to the east. After the intersection the US 11 heads toward the community of Carriere. US 11 soon afterward enters the community of Hawthorne. The US 11 then enters the community of McNeill. After McNeill, US 11 turns to the northeast once again. US 11 passes through the communities of Tyler and Millard.

US 11 heads to the east and enters the community of Derby. There, US 11 turns to the northeast, intersecting with MS 26. After that intersection, US 11 continues northward into Poplarville. In Poplarville, the highway intersects with a short, original alignment of itself. As the highway continues northward, it begins to parallel I-59 once again. After a short distance, US 11 leaves Pearl River County for Lamar County. After the county crossing, Red Top Road merges in, and the route begins paralleling the nearby railroad tracks. After a short distance, US 11 enters the city of Lumberton.

=== Lamar County ===
US 11 enters the city of Lumberton once crossing the county line then heads to the local community of Seneca. The highway continues to the northeast, entering the community of Talowah and passes through the city of Purvis. Paralleling the original alignment, the two roads eventually intersect and switch directions; eventually, it will intersect with MS 589, which becomes concurrent. US 11 enters the community of Richburg before crossing the county line and into Forrest County.

=== Forrest County ===
In the community of Richburg, US 11 crosses the county line from Lamar County and into Forrest County. The highway interchanges with exit 60 on I-59 and US 98 then enters the community of Bonhome. At an intersection with Richburg Road, US 11 leaves Bonhome and enters the city of Hattiesburg.

In Hattiesburg, US 11 makes a curve to the north and takes the name Broadway Drive. US 11 becomes a divided highway and, turning northeast, reaches an interchange with US 49 at a complete cloverleaf interchange, one of very few in the South to lack merging lanes between loop ramps, thus exacerbating the weaving patterns which plague many cloverleaf interchanges. After the interchange ends, US 11 continues to the northeast, meeting Pine Street and adopting its name. US 11 next enters the downtown area, the route surrounded by commercial buildings and paralleled by nearby railroad tracks. Near the city hall, the northeast-bound route follows Hardy Street, Front Street and Mobile Street, while the southeast-bound route remains on Pine Street.

The northeast-bound and southeast-bound routes merge back onto Pine Street; shortly thereafter, US 11 turns to the north as Bouie Street, then intersects with Old Highway 42. Again heading northeast, US 11 is concurrent with Old Highway 42 across the Leaf River into Petal; the routes then split, with US 11 heading to the north and Old Highway 42 heading to the east. Paralleling nearby railroad tracks, US 11 crosses under the MS 42 expressway, which has an interchange with US 11; the route soon becomes less developed and leaves Petal.

US 11 continues northward and comes to the community of Dragon. The route leaves Dragon and begins a slight curve to the northwest, still paralleling the railroad tracks. At an intersection near Eastabutchie, US 11 crosses the county line and into Jones County.

=== Jones County ===
In Jones County, US-11 passes through the community of Moselle before entering Ellisville. US 11 first intersects MS-29 and MS-590 in Ellisville. North of Ellisville, US-11 meets Interstate 59 and then meets again. US-11 goes through the downtown of Laurel. It intersects I-59 for the final time outside of Laurel. US-11 passes Sandersville before entering Jasper County.

=== Jasper County ===
US 11 enters Jasper County after passing through Sandersville. It bypasses the town of Heidelberg to the east before meeting Mississippi Highway 528. The route then goes through the unincorporated community of Stafford Springs. US-11 parallels the Jasper-Clarke county line before finally entering into Clarke County

=== Clarke County ===
The highway goes through rural forests before entering Pachuta. Here it intersects MS 18, which meets I-59 a few miles west. Soon after, US 11 enters the town of Enterprise. In Enterprise, US 11 has a small concurrency with MS 513 until it splits off. North of town, US 11 crosses the Chunky River. US 11 takes a windy path up to the county line and enters Lauderdale County.

=== Lauderdale County ===
US 11 goes through the southwest section of the county, crossing the Okatibbee River before entering into Meridian.

The highway passes by the Meridian Regional Airport before meeting I-59 and I-20. Here it joins the two interstates in a concurrency along with US 80 and MS 19. These highways pass through the south side of Meridian having several exits including one with MS 145, the old alignment of US 45. At Exit 154A, MS 19 exits and goes south. At Exit 154B, US 11 and 80 exits onto MS 39 before shortly ending the concurrency and turning east.

The two routes pass under US 45 and goes through the small community of Russell. US 11 and US 80 go through Toomsuba and intersects I-59 and I-20 soon after. The two routes go through the community of Kewanee and a few miles later, cross the state line and enter the state of Alabama

== Major intersections ==
County	Location	mi	km	Destinations	Notes
Pearl River	Nicholson	0.0	0.0	I-59 south / US 11 south – New Orleans	Continuation into Louisiana
Pearl River	Nicholson	0.5	0.80	I-59 north / MS 607 south – Stennis Space Center, Hattiesburg	Northern end of I-59 concurrency; Exit 1 on I-59
Pearl River	Picayune	6.3	10.1	MS 43 – Hattiesburg, Crossroads	
Pearl River	Poplarville	28.1	45.2	MS 26 – Wiggins, Bogalusa	
Lamar	Lumberton	41.8	67.3	MS 13 – Maxie, Columbia	
Lamar	Purvis	52.4	84.3	MS 589 – Sumrall	
Forrest	Hattiesburg	61.1	98.3	I-59 / US 98 – Laurel, New Orleans	Exit 60 on I-59
Forrest	Hattiesburg	64.7	104.1	US 49 – Gulfport, Jackson	
Forrest	Petal	69.8	112.3	MS 42 to I-59	
Jones	Ellisville	87.5	140.8	MS 590 west – Seminary	Eastern terminus of MS 590
Jones	Ellisville	89.0	143.2	MS 29 to MS 588 west / I-59 – Soso, Runnelstown	Eastern terminus of MS 588
Jones	Walters	91.1	146.6	I-59 – Laurel, Hattiesburg	Exit 90 on I-59
Jones	Laurel	93.6	150.6	I-59 – Hattiesburg, Meridian	Exit 93 on I-59
Jones	Laurel	99.4	160.0	I-59 – Hattiesburg, Sandersville, Meridian	Exit 99 on I-59
Jasper	Heidelberg	112.6	181.2	MS 528 north	Southern terminus of MS 528
Clarke	Pachuta	125.9	202.6	MS 18 – Quitman, Bay Springs	
Clarke	Enterprise	135.8	218.5	MS 513 south	Southern end of MS 513 concurrency
Clarke	Enterprise	136.1	219.0	MS 513 north – Stonewall, Quitman	Northern end of MS 513 concurrency
Lauderdale	Meridian	150.4	242.0	I-20 west / I-59 south / US 80 west / MS 19 north – Jackson, Philadelphia	Western end of I-20/I-59/US 80/MS 19 concurrency; I-20/59 exit 150
Lauderdale	Meridian	151.1	243.2	James Chaney Drive, Valley Road, 49th Avenue	I-20/59 exit 151
Lauderdale	Meridian	152.0	244.6	29th Avenue	I-20/59 exit 152
Lauderdale	Meridian	153.3	246.7	MS 145 south / MS 493 north (22nd Avenue) – Quitman	Northern terminus of MS 145; southern terminus of MS 493; I-20/59 exit 153
Lauderdale	Meridian	155.0	249.4	I-20 east / I-59 north / MS 19 south / MS 39 – Tuscaloosa, Butler	Eastern end of I-20/I-59/MS 19 concurrency; southern end of MS 39 concurrnecy; southern terminus of MS 39; I-20/59 exit 154
Lauderdale	Meridian	155.9	250.9	MS 39 north – De Kalb	Northern end of MS 39 concurrency
Lauderdale		170.3	274.1	I-20 / I-59 – Meridian, Tuscaloosa	I-20/59 exit 169
Lauderdale		173.1	278.6	US 11 north / US 80 east	Alabama state line
1.000 mi = 1.609 km; 1.000 km = 0.621 mi: Concurrency terminus

U.S. Route 11
Previous state: Louisiana	Mississippi	Next state: Alabama
