= Mississippi Highway 29 =

State Highway in Mississippi

Mississippi Highway 29

Route information
- Maintained by MDOT
- Length: 78.7 mi (126.7 km) (78.009 mi excluding concurrency with MS 149)
- Existed: 1950–present

Major junctions
- South end: MS 26 / MS 149 in Wiggins
- US 98 in New Augusta; US 11 in Ellisville; I-59 in Ellisville; US 84 near Calhoun
- North end: MS 28 in Soso

Location
- Country: United States
- State: Mississippi
- Counties: Stone, Perry, Jones

Highway system
- Mississippi State Highway System; Interstate; US; State
← MS 28	→ MS 30

Mississippi Highway 29 (MS 29) is a state highway in southern Mississippi. It runs from north to south for 78.7 miles (126.7 km) and serves three counties: Jones, Perry, Stone.

== Route description ==
MS 29 begins in Stone County at an interchange between MS 26 (W Central Avenue) and MS 149 (Magnolia Drive) in Wiggins. It heads north concurrent (overlapped) with MS 149 and they head straight up through the center of downtown for several blocks before MS 29 splits off and heads east through neighborhoods along E Hatten Avenue. MS 29 merges onto Parkway Drive to pass by the Flint Creek Water Park before leaving the Wiggins city limits and traveling northeast through a mix of farmland and woodlands for a few miles to cross into Perry County.

MS 29 travels through farmland for several miles before entering the Black Creek Wilderness portion of De Soto National Forest, where it crosses Black Creek and winds its way through remote woodlands for several miles, exiting only briefly to pass through the community of Janice. The highway finally exits the forest as it passes through the town of New Augusta, where it has an intersection with US 98, before crossing the Leaf River. MS 29 begins paralleling Tallahala Creek as it heads north through mostly rural wooded areas, with some farmland here and there, for several miles to pass through Runnelstown, where it has an intersection with MS 42. The highway winds its way through more woodlands before crossing into Jones County at the community of Whitfield.

MS 29 travels northwest through farmland for several miles to pass through Johnson and cross Tallahala Creek before entering the Ellisville city limits at an intersection with MS 590. It passes through some neighborhoods before merging onto S Church Street as it passes by Jones College. The highway heads north through neighborhoods before turning left onto Holly Street to pass along the northern edge of downtown, as well as cross a railroad track. MS 29 immediately has an intersection with US 11, where it becomes Hill Street as well as begins a concurrency with MS 588. The travel northwest through a business district for several blocks to have an interchange with I-59 (Exit 88) before MS 588 splits off and heads west. MS 29 leaves Ellisville shortly thereafter and travels northwest through rural farmland for several miles, where it has an interchange with US 84, before entering the town of Soso and coming to an end at an intersection with MS 28.

The entire length of Mississippi Highway 29 is a rural two lane state highway.

== Major intersections ==
County	Location	mi	km	Destinations	Notes
Stone	Wiggins	0.0	0.0	MS 26 / MS 149 south to US 49 – Poplarville, Lucedale	Southern terminus; interchange; south end of MS 149 overlap
Stone	Wiggins	0.7	1.1	MS 149 north	North end of MS 149 overlap
Stone	Wiggins	2.0	3.2	Flint Creek Water Park main entrance	Access road into park
Perry	De Soto National Forest	20.3	32.7	Progress Road (FS 385) - McLain	
Perry	De Soto National Forest	23.5	37.8	Beaumont-Brooklyn Road - Beaumont	
Perry	New Augusta	32.7	52.6	US 98 – Hattiesburg, Lucedale	
Perry		34.6	55.7	Buck Creek Road to Old Augusta Road - McSwain, Richton	
Perry		35.4	57.0	Old River Road - Hattiesburg	
Perry	Runnelstown	46.1	74.2	MS 42 – Hattiesburg, Richton	
Jones		65.0	104.6	MS 590 west to I-59 – Seminary	Eastern terminus of MS 590
Jones	Ellisville	66.5	107.0	US 11 – Laurel, Hattiesburg MS 588 begins	Eastern terminus of MS 588; south end of MS 588 overlap
Jones	Ellisville	67.2– 67.4	108.1– 108.5	I-59 – Hattiesburg, Laurel	I-59 exit 88
Jones	Ellisville	67.7	109.0	MS 588 west – Collins	North end of MS 588 overlap
Jones		72.5– 72.9	116.7– 117.3	US 84 – Collins, Laurel	Interchange
Jones	Soso	78.7	126.7	MS 28 – Taylorsville, Laurel	Northern terminus
1.000 mi = 1.609 km; 1.000 km = 0.621 mi: Concurrency terminus
