= Mississippi Highway 604 =

Highway in Mississippi

Mississippi Highway 604
- MS 604 highlighted in red

Route information
- Maintained by MDOT
- Length: 5.071 mi (8.161 km)
- Existed: 1950–present

Major junctions
- South end: US 90 in Pearlington
- North end: MS 607 near Pearlington

Location
- Country: United States
- State: Mississippi
- Counties: Hancock

Highway system
- Mississippi State Highway System; Interstate; US; State
| ← MS 603 | → MS 605 |

Mississippi Highway 604 (MS 604) is a 5.071-mile-long (8.161 km) state highway on the Mississippi Gulf Coast. Its southern terminus is at U.S. Route 90 (US 90). MS 604 travels northward through Pearlington to its northern terminus at MS 607. The route was designated in 1950, after US 90 was realigned off of it in 1939 onto a new road built in 1936.

== Route description ==
All of the undivided, two-laned route is located in western Hancock County. MS 604 starts at US 90 south of Pearlington and travels north. The road goes through a small forest, before turning northwest and entering Pearlington. MS 604 goes through the center of Pearlington, and turns north at Levee Street. The route soon travels northeast as it leaves Pearlington. MS 604 enters into larger forests for around three miles (4.8 km). About 0.5 miles (0.80 km) south of MS 607, MS 604 travels northward. The road soon ends at MS 607 at a T-intersection.

In 2013, Mississippi Department of Transportation (MDOT) calculated as many as 1,000 vehicles traveling north of Birch Drive, and as few as 840 vehicles traveling south of MS 607. MS 604 is legally defined in Mississippi Code § 65-3-3. MS 604 is maintained by the Mississippi Department of Transportation. The route is part of the Westonia Scenic Byway to Space, which starts at MS 607, travels on MS 604, and ends at Stennis Space Center's buffer zone near Pearlington.

== History ==
Since 1928, US 90 was routed through Santa Rosa, and concurrent with US 11 before crossing into Louisiana. In 1936, a new, paved road was built from US 90 to south of Slidell, bypassing the town. Three years later, US 90 was realigned south on this new road. This caused the southern terminus to be US 90, and the northern terminus at an unsigned highway, which would become MS 11-90 a year later. In 1948, the route was renumbered to MS 43, and by 1950, the former alignment of US 90 bypassed in 1936 became signed as MS 604. In 1967, MS 43 was rerouted to its east, and the old alignment became MS 607.

== Major intersections ==
The entire route is in Hancock County.

| Location | mi | km | Destinations | Notes |
|---|---|---|---|---|
| Pearlington | 0.000 | 0.000 | US 90 – Bay St. Louis, New Orleans, LA | Southern terminus |
| | 5.071 | 8.161 | MS 607 – Picayune, Bay St. Louis | Northern terminus; provides access to John C. Stennis Space Center |
1.000 mi = 1.609 km; 1.000 km = 0.621 mi
