= Janice, Mississippi =

- Unincorporated community
- Location within Mississippi Location within the United States
- Coordinates: 31°01′32″N 89°02′12″W
- Country: United States
- State: Mississippi
- County: Perry
- Elevation: 236 ft (72 m)
- Time zone: UTC-6 (Central (CST))
  - Summer (DST): UTC-5 (CDT)
- ZIP code: 39425
- Area code: 601
- GNIS feature ID: 693601

Janice is an unincorporated community located in Perry County, Mississippi, United States. Janice is approximately 10 miles (16 km) east-southeast of Brooklyn and approximately 15 miles (24 km) northeast of Wiggins on Mississippi Highway 29 and a part of the Hattiesburg, Mississippi Metropolitan Statistical Area. Janice is located within the Black Creek Wilderness portion of De Soto National Forest.

A post office operated under the name Janice from 1901 to 1915.
