= Mississippi Highway 590 =

State highway in Mississippi

Mississippi Highway 590

Route information
- Maintained by MDOT
- Length: 22.233 mi (35.781 km)
- Existed: 1950–present

Major junctions
- West end: US 49 near Seminary
- I-59 near Ellisville; US 11 in Ellisville
- East end: MS 29 near Ellisville

Location
- Country: United States
- State: Mississippi
- Counties: Covington, Jones

Highway system
- Mississippi State Highway System; Interstate; US; State
← MS 589	→ MS 591

Mississippi Highway 590 (MS 590) is a state highway that runs for 22 miles (35 km) from the Seminary area at U.S. Route 49 (US 49) to just outside of Ellisville at MS 29 in the southern portion of Mississippi.

== Route description ==
MS 590's western terminus is located just west of the town of Seminary along US 49, just north of its intersection with MS 589. Heading east along Main Street into town (just past its crossing of the Okatoma Creek, the road passes some stores, homes, and churches. In the center of Seminary, MS 590 has the road name of Main Street and crosses a railroad at-grade. Towards the east side of town, it intersects MS 535 at its southern terminus. Once leaving town, the highway heads east through a mix of woods, open fields, poultry farms, and houses. The road transitions from Covington County to Jones County with similar surroundings from before. In rural Jones County, MS 590 crosses Leaf River. Starting to approach Ellisville, MS 590 has an interchange with Interstate 59 I-59) at its exit 85. MS 590 briefly parallels I-59 but then turns to the east to head around the north side of Jaycee Evaluation Center and Ellisville State School. Soon after, a quadrant road provides access to US 11 within the town limits of Ellisville. The highway crosses US 11, a railroad, and Rocky Creek on a 2,000-foot-long (610 m) bridge and then heads around the south side of Jones County Junior College with a driveway providing access to the college. Now curving slightly to the northeast, MS 590 ends southeast of downtown Ellisville at an intersection with MS 29.

== History ==
The general routing of MS 590 had existed in the state highway system since at least 1928. By 1950, the MS 590 designation was applied to this road with a small portion of the road around Seminary being paved. The road was slowly improved over the next few years until it had been fully improved by 1964. Beginning in 2011, the Mississippi Department of Transportation constructed a 2.3-mile-long (3.7 km) extension of MS 590 from just west of its original terminus at US 11 to MS 29 southeast of Ellisville. The construction also included a new entrance to Jones County Junior College. The extension was completed in September 2013.

== Major intersections ==
County	Location	mi	km	Destinations	Notes
Covington		0.000	0.000	US 49 – Hattiesburg, Collins, Jackson	Western terminus
Covington	Seminary	1.174	1.889	MS 535 north	Southern terminus of MS 535
Jones		18.711– 18.869	30.112– 30.367	I-59 – Laurel, Hattiesburg	Exit 85 (I-59)
Jones	Ellisville	20.394	32.821	US 11 – Ellisville, Ellisville State School, Moselle	Quadrant interchange
Jones		22.233	35.781	MS 29 (Church Street) – Ellisville, Johnson	Eastern terminus
1.000 mi = 1.609 km; 1.000 km = 0.621 mi
