= Mississippi Highway 589 =

Highway in Mississippi

Mississippi Highway 589

Route information
- Maintained by MDOT
- Length: 35.818 mi (57.643 km)
- Existed: 1956–present

Major junctions
- South end: I-59 in Purvis
- US 11 in Purvis; US 98 near Oak Grove
- North end: US 49 in Seminary

Location
- Country: United States
- State: Mississippi
- Counties: Lamar, Covington

Highway system
- Mississippi State Highway System; Interstate; US; State
← MS 588	→ MS 590

Mississippi Highway 589 (MS 589) runs north–south from Interstate 59 (I-59) east of Purvis, Mississippi to U.S. Highway 49 (US 49) near Seminary, Mississippi. Portions of this highway run parallel to the Longleaf Trace.

== History ==
MS 589 first appeared on maps in 1956, connecting from US 11 to US 49 and MS 590. Only a small section in Lamar County, and between US 98 and Sumrall were paved. More of the route in Lamar County was paved a year later. By 1958, a small part of MS 589 north of US 98 was rerouted west, connecting with the route south of US 98. All of the route south of Sumrall was paved by 1960. In 1967, MS 589 was extended to I-59, and the remaining unpaved section was removed from the map, until a year later.

== Major intersections ==
County	Location	mi	km	Destinations	Notes
Lamar	Purvis	0.0	0.0	I-59 – Hattiesburg, New Orleans, LA	I-59 exit 51; southern terminus
Lamar	Purvis	2.2	3.5	US 11 – Hattiesburg, Lumberton	
Lamar	Oak Grove	15.2	24.5	US 98 – Columbia, Hattiesburg	
Lamar	Sumrall	24.7	39.8	MS 42 – Rawls Springs, Bassfield	
Covington	Seminary	35.9	57.8	US 49 – Collins, Jackson, Hattiesburg	Northern terminus
1.000 mi = 1.609 km; 1.000 km = 0.621 mi
