= Mississippi Highway 513 =

State highway in Mississippi

Mississippi Highway 513

Route information
- Maintained by MDOT
- Length: 23.692 mi (38.129 km)
- Existed: 1950–present

Major junctions
- South end: MS 145 in Quitman
- US 11 in Enterprise; I-59 near Enterprise
- North end: MS 18 in Rose Hill

Location
- Country: United States
- State: Mississippi
- Counties: Clarke, Jasper

Highway system
- Mississippi State Highway System; Interstate; US; State
← MS 512	→ MS 514

Mississippi Highway 513 (MS 513) is a 23.7-mile-long (38.1 km) state highway running between Quitman and Rose Hill. Established in 1950, it is signed as a north–south highway, though it generally runs from east to west.

== Route description ==
The state highway begins at an intersection with MS 145 in the northern reaches of Quitman, Clarke County. MS 513 heads northwest, briefly passing through a residential neighborhood, before heading through a mostly wooded rural area. The highway provides access to Clarke County Airport northwest of Quitman. It briefly curves to the west, then to the north as MS 513 enters the town of Stonewall. MS 513, known as Erwin Road, passes a factory, then travels through the center of the town. Heading out of the town towards the north, MS 513 soon enters the town of Enterprise passing a middle school and turning to the west. It intersects MS 514 at its western terminus while MS 513 continues west into the center of the town, crossing two railroads. After the second railroad crossing, MS 513 curves to the south, intersects the unsigned MS 952, and makes another 90-degree turn to the west at Main Street to reach U.S. Route 11 (US 11).

US 11 and MS 513 form a concurrency and head south for about 1/4 mile (0.40 km). The concurrency ends when MS 513 turns off US 11 to head west again. After exiting the town limits of Enterprise, the highway heads through a rural wooded area. MS 513 has an interchange with Interstate 59 at its exit 134. The road makes some winding curves until it reaches the Jasper County line. After crossing into Jasper County, MS 513 begins to travel more southwesterly. The highway ends at an intersection with MS 18 in the unincorporated community of Rose Hill.

== History ==
A state road connecting Quitman and Enterprise was first established in 1942 along a gravel road. This road was numbered MS 513 in 1950 and was fully paved. Six years later in 1956, the route was extended west to Rose Hill first as a gravel road. This western portion of the highway was improved with construction being completed in July 1960. The highway has generally maintained its alignment since then.

== Major intersections ==
County	Location	mi	km	Destinations	Notes
Clarke	Quitman	0.000	0.000	MS 145 (North Archusa Avenue) / East Lynda Street – Meridian, Waynesboro	Southern terminus
Clarke	Enterprise	11.059	17.798	MS 514 east	Western terminus of MS 514
Clarke	Enterprise	12.149	19.552	MS 952 north (Old Mill Creek Road)	Southern terminus of MS 952
Clarke	Enterprise	12.291	19.780	US 11 north / CR 360 (Helm Road) – Meridian	Southern end of US 11 concurrency
Clarke	Enterprise	12.567	20.225	US 11 south – Pachuta	Northern end of US 11 concurrency
Clarke		14.601– 14.805	23.498– 23.826	I-59 – Meridian, Laurel	Exit 134 (I-59)
Jasper	Rose Hill	23.692	38.129	MS 18	Northern terminus
1.000 mi = 1.609 km; 1.000 km = 0.621 mi: Concurrency terminus
