= Mississippi Highway 528 =

State highway in Mississippi

Mississippi Highway 528

Route information
- Maintained by MDOT
- Length: 23.682 mi (38.112 km)
- Existed: 1952–present

Major junctions
- West end: MS 15 in Bay Springs
- I-59 in Heidelberg
- East end: US 11 near Heidelberg

Location
- Country: United States
- State: Mississippi
- Counties: Jasper

Highway system
- Mississippi State Highway System; Interstate; US; State
← MS 514	→ MS 529

Mississippi Highway 528 (MS 528) is a state highway in Jasper County, Mississippi. It is 23.7 miles (38.1 km) long and travels between Bay Springs at MS 15 to U.S. Route 11 (US 11) outside of Heidelberg. An interchange with Interstate 59 (I-59) is located along the highway within the town limits of Heidelberg.

== Route description ==
The highway begins in Bay Springs at the intersection of MS 15 and West 6th Avenue where MS 528 heads east. This portion of the road is located one block south of MS 18. MS 528 heads past some buildings, crosses a railroad at-grade, and continues into a residential portion of the city. The road makes a sharp curve to the southeast where it begins to travel through more surroundings, but still within the city limits of Bay Springs. MS 528 turns to the east again at an intersection with County Road 17 (CR 17). The road makes another brief southeasterly jog before passing Thigpen Field Airport and exits Bay Springs city limits. Heading along a more curvy alignment east, MS 528 heads through mostly wooded areas passing the small settlements of Lake Como, Acme, and Waldrup.

The road curves to the southeast heading through more wooded areas. It had a brief straight section heading due east before reaching MS 503 at its southern terminus. MS 528 curves to the south where it enters the town limits of Heidelberg and reaches a diamond interchange with I-59 at its exit 113. Past the Interstate, the road passes some gas stations and fast food restaurants. Approaching the center of Heidelberg, MS 528 becomes known as North Pine Avenue, passes Heidelberg High School, some stores, and churches. After a brief southerly heading, MS 528 turns to the east to travel along Main Street to head through the town center. It crosses a railroad at-grade to head through a wooded residential area of down traveling southeast. Shortly after exiting the town limits, MS 528 ends at US 11 where the road continues south as CR 37.

== History ==
MS 528 was designed by the state in late 1952. The State Highway Commission improved about eight miles (13 km) of roads in 1952 with construction complete by December of that year. Since its completion, the highway had always been asphalt-paved.

== Major intersections ==
The entire route is in Jasper County.

Location	mi	km	Destinations	Notes
Bay Springs	0.000	0.000	MS 15 to MS 18 / West 6th Avenue – Laurel, Newton, Raleigh, Pachuta	Western terminus
	18.669	30.045	MS 503 north – Paulding	Southern terminus of MS 503
Heidelberg	19.476– 19.614	31.344– 31.566	I-59 – Laurel, Meridian	Exit 113 (I-59)
	23.682	38.112	US 11 / CR 37	Eastern terminus
1.000 mi = 1.609 km; 1.000 km = 0.621 mi
