= Mississippi Highway 588 =

State highway in Mississippi

Mississippi Highway 588

Route information
- Maintained by MDOT
- Length: 21.378 mi (34.405 km)
- Existed: 1956–present

Major junctions
- West end: US 84 near Collins
- East end: MS 29 in Ellisville

Location
- Country: United States
- State: Mississippi
- Counties: Covington, Jones

Highway system
- Mississippi State Highway System; Interstate; US; State
← MS 587	→ MS 589

Mississippi Highway 588 (MS 588) is a 21-mile-long (34 km) state highway running from U.S. Route 84 (US 84) outside of Collins to MS 29 in Ellisville in southern Mississippi.

== Route description ==
MS 588 begins at an intersection with US 84 and Salem School Road, less than one mile (1.6 km) east of the center of Collins. The two lane road generally heads east through wooded areas though within the first two miles (3.2 km), it passes facilities for various oil pipeline companies including TransMontaigne, Colonial Pipeline, and Plantation Pipeline. Continuing east from here, MS 588 passes through the settlements of Willowtown and Eminence. In the latter location, MS 588 intersects MS 535 at its northern terminus. Heading east, through a mix of open fields and woods, the highway enters Jones County from Covington County. MS 588 goes through the community of Oak Bowery, crosses the Oakey Woods Creek and Leaf River, and reaches Sand Hill. Near its end, the highway enters the town of Ellisville. It generally heads east until sharply curving to the north at Interstate 59 (I-59). About 1,000 feet (300 m) later, MS 588 ends at an intersection with MS 29, immediately adjacent to I-59's exit 88, and Hal Crocker Road.

== History ==
MS 588 was designated in 1956 generally running along the alignment it has today. The only change was made when its eastern terminus was shifted northwest along MS 29 due to the construction of I-59.

== Major intersections ==
County	Location	mi	km	Destinations	Notes
Covington		0.000	0.000	US 84 / Salem School Road – Collins, Laurel	Western terminus
Covington	Eminence	7.702	12.395	MS 535 south – Seminary	Northern terminus of MS 535
Jones	Ellisville	21.378	34.405	MS 29 to I-59 / Hal Crocker Road – Ellisville, Soso, David Merchant Memorial Park	Eastern terminus
1.000 mi = 1.609 km; 1.000 km = 0.621 mi
