= Castaffa Creek =

Stream in Mississippi, United States

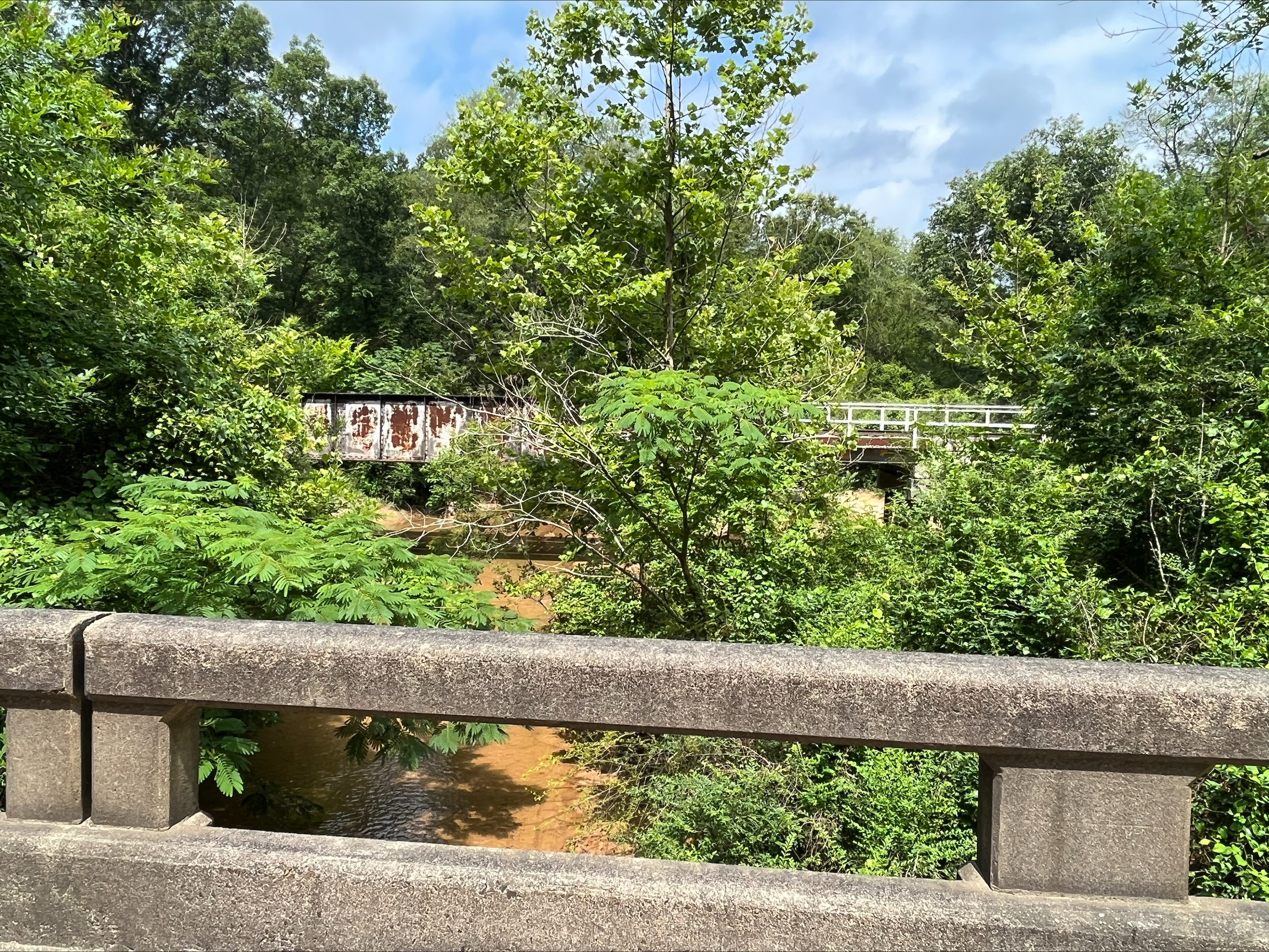
- Castaffa Creek with Norfolk Southern Railway crossing in Clarke County

Location
- Country: United States
- State: Mississippi

Physical characteristics
- Source
  - coordinates: 31.9897222°N 88.9855556°W
- Mouth
  - coordinates: 31.9762636°N 88.9042173°W
- Length: 4.8 mi (7.7 km)

Castaffa Creek is a stream in the U.S. state of Mississippi. It is a tributary to Shubuta Creek.

Castaffa is a name derived from the Choctaw language. Variant names are "Castaffy Creek" and "Chaslaffa Creek".
