= Mississippi Highway 607 =

Highway in Mississippi

Mississippi Highway 607
- Shuttle Parkway; Hospitality Highway
- MS 607 highlighted in red

Route information
- Maintained by MDOT
- Length: 9.776 mi (15.733 km)
- Existed: 1967–present

Major junctions
- South end: US 90 near Waveland
- I-10 near Pearlington
- North end: I-59 / US 11 near Nicholson

Location
- Country: United States
- State: Mississippi
- Counties: Hancock, Pearl River

Highway system
- Mississippi State Highway System; Interstate; US; State
← MS 606	→ MS 609

Mississippi Highway 607 (MS 607) is a state highway in the Mississippi Gulf Coast region. The route starts at U.S. Route 90 (US 90), and it travels westward to Interstate 10 (I-10). The route has a gap as the road travels through the Stennis Space Center, but resumes north of the center to end at I-59 and US 11 south of Picayune. The road was part of US 11 and US 90, before MS 43 was designated in 1948. MS 607 was created in 1967, after MS 43 was rerouted, and Stennis Space Center was built.

== Route description ==
All of the route is located in Hancock and Pearl River counties. MS 607 starts at a T-intersection with US 90 and travels westward. The route goes through a forest as a divided highway. Nearly five miles (8.0 km) later, MS 607 intersects MS 604 as it turns northwest. After passing by two electrical substations, it crosses a road that leads to the Mississippi welcome center and INFINITY Science Center, a NASA visitor center. The route then intersects I-10 at a diamond interchange, and state maintenance ends just north of it along with the formal designation of MS 607. United States government maintenance begins, and the road soon turns north. About two miles (3.2 km) later, MS 607 travels through an access gate and enters Stennis Space Center.

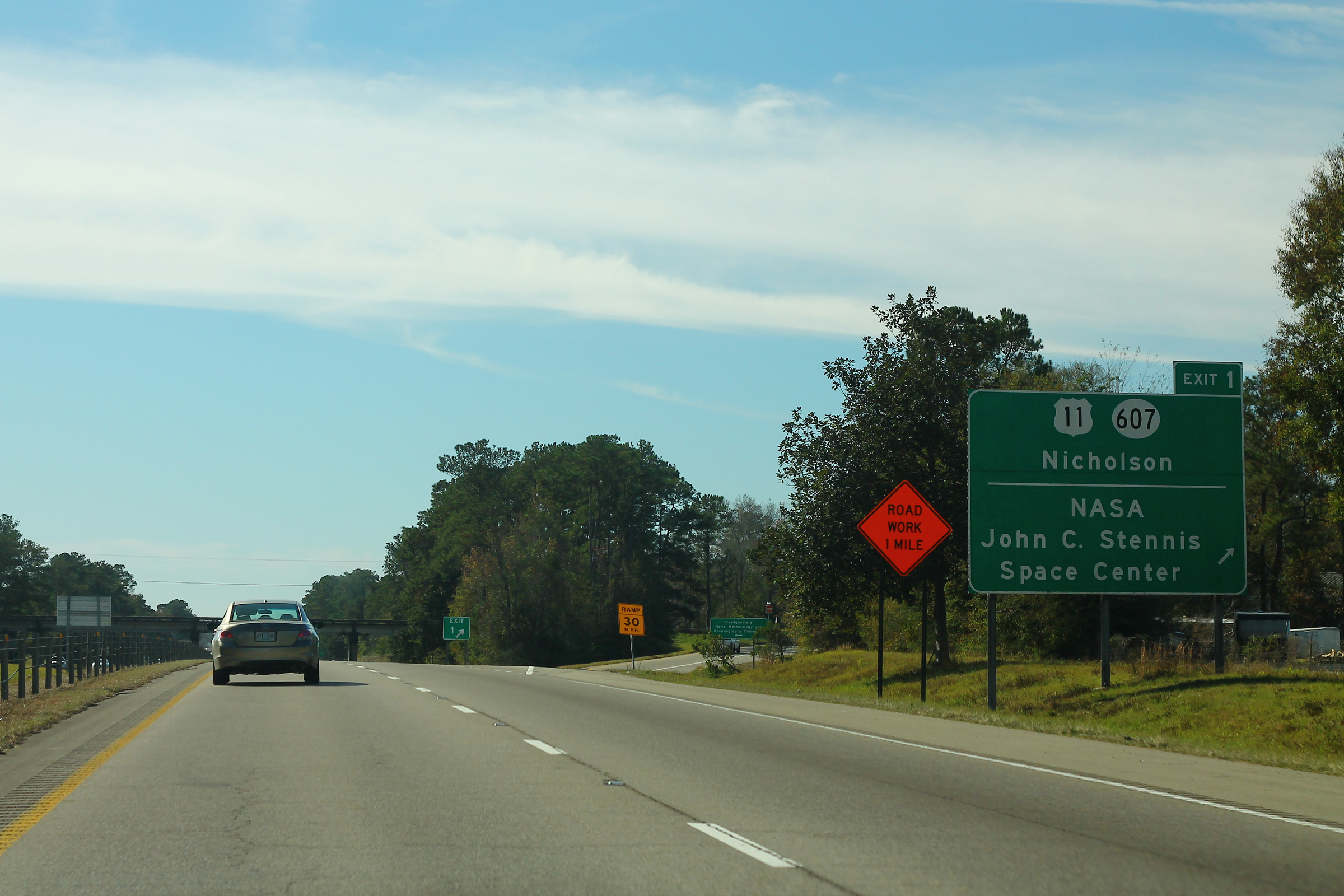
Exit sign on I-59 for MS 607 and US 11 near Nicholson

Past the access gate, the road crosses over a canal and intersects road that leads to an old alignment of MS 43. MS 607 later shifts northwest until it meets H Road. It then travels north through thick forests for more than two mi (3.2 km), until it reaches Gravel Pit Road, where it begins traveling northwest. South of Turtleskin Creek, MS 607 reaches to an access gate. State maintenance and the MS 607 designation resumes at the intersection of Texas Flat Road and the old alignment of US 11. The route continues traveling northwest as a divided highway through the forest, entering Pearl River County and intersecting Asa McQueen Road. Small houses soon appear, and the route necks down to two lanes and meets US 11 and I-59 at a diamond interchange. The road continues on into Picayune as US 11.

In 2019, Mississippi Department of Transportation (MDOT) calculated as many as 8,700 vehicles traveling west of US 90, and as few as 2,900 vehicles traveling south of Texas Flat Road. All of the road is maintained by MDOT and the United States Government. MS 607 is part of two scenic routes and memorial designations: Hospitality Highway, which is designated from I-10 to US 90, and NASA Scenic Byway to Space, starting at the intersection of MS 607 and MS 604 to the south gate of the center, then from the north gate to Texas Flat Road.

== History ==
The road that became part of MS 607 was part of US 90 and US 11 since 1928, and all of it became paved by 1934. In 1936, a new road was built from US 90 to south of Slidell, and US 90 was soon rerouted to it. The road between US 11 and US 90 became MS 11-90. By 1939, US 90 was moved to another new road, bypassing the old one. The MS 11-90 designation was temporarily removed in 1942, and was restored the next year. In 1948, MS 11-90's designation was removed, and the road became part of MS 43. Between 1958 and 1960, I-59 and I-10 were proposed. Meanwhile, the United States Army Corps of Engineers began buying land in Hancock County for the Mississippi Test Operations in 1962, which later became Stennis Space Center. In 1967, MS 43's alignment was moved around NASA's test site, and the old alignment became MS 607. Only north and south of the test area were state maintained. Construction at the test facility was completed later that year. By January 1971, I-10 was connected to MS 607. One month later, MS 607 south of the Stennis Space Center was upgraded to a four-lane divided highway, after it was proposed in 1969. A project to widen MS 607 from Texas Flat Road to I-59 began in 2013, and construction continued through 2015.

== Major intersections ==
County	Location	mi	km	Destinations	Notes
Hancock		0.000	0.000	US 90 – Pearlington, Bay St. Louis	Southern terminus
Hancock		4.565	7.347	MS 604 west – Pearlington	Northern terminus of MS 604
Hancock		5.353– 6.010	8.615– 9.672	I-10 – New Orleans, LA, Mobile, AL	I-10 exit 2; Diamond interchange
Hancock		6.084	9.791	Old Napolean–Westonia Road	End state maintenance
Hancock	Gap in route				
Hancock	Santa Rosa	6.084	9.791	Old US 11 / Texas Flat Road	Begin state maintenance
Pearl River		9.687– 9.776	15.590– 15.733	I-59 / US 11 – Hattiesburg, New Orleans, LA	I-59 exit 1; northern terminus; diamond interchange
1.000 mi = 1.609 km; 1.000 km = 0.621 mi

== See also ==
- Mississippi Highway 602 – A former state highway that also passed through what is now Stennis Space Center
