= Sand Hill, Jones County, Mississippi =

Sand Hill, Mississippi
- Unincorporated community
- Location within Mississippi Location within the United States
- Coordinates: 31°37′15″N 89°16′54″W
- Country: United States
- State: Mississippi
- County: Jones
- Elevation: 308 ft (94 m)
- Time zone: UTC-6 (Central (CST))
  - Summer (DST): UTC-5 (CDT)
- Area codes: 601 & 769
- GNIS feature ID: 692205

Sand Hill is an unincorporated community in Jones County, Mississippi, United States. Sand Hill is located on Mississippi Highway 588 5.2 miles (8.4 km) west-northwest of Ellisville.
