= Purvis, Mississippi =

- City
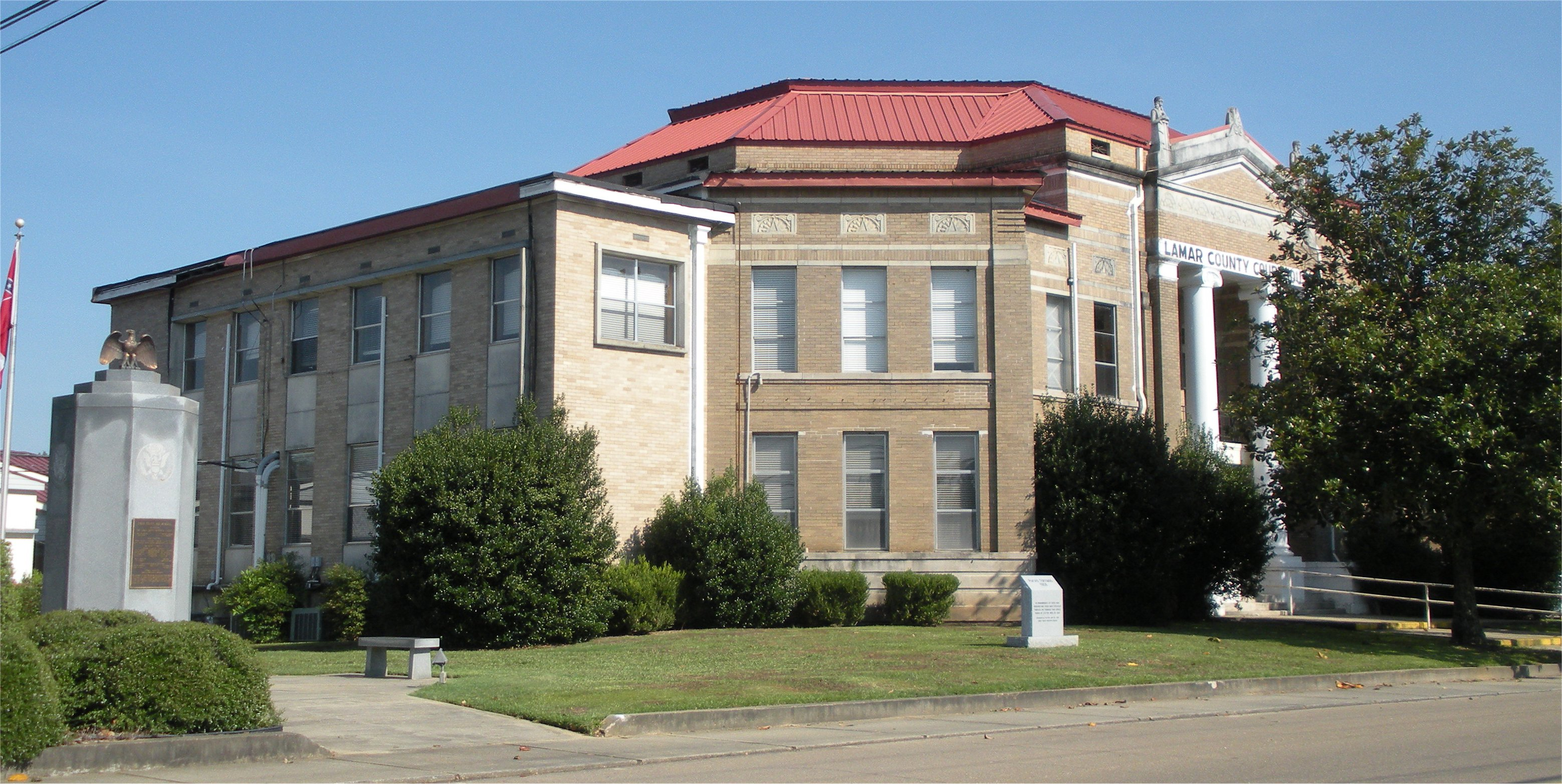
- Current Lamar County Courthouse in Purvis, Mississippi, circa 1956.

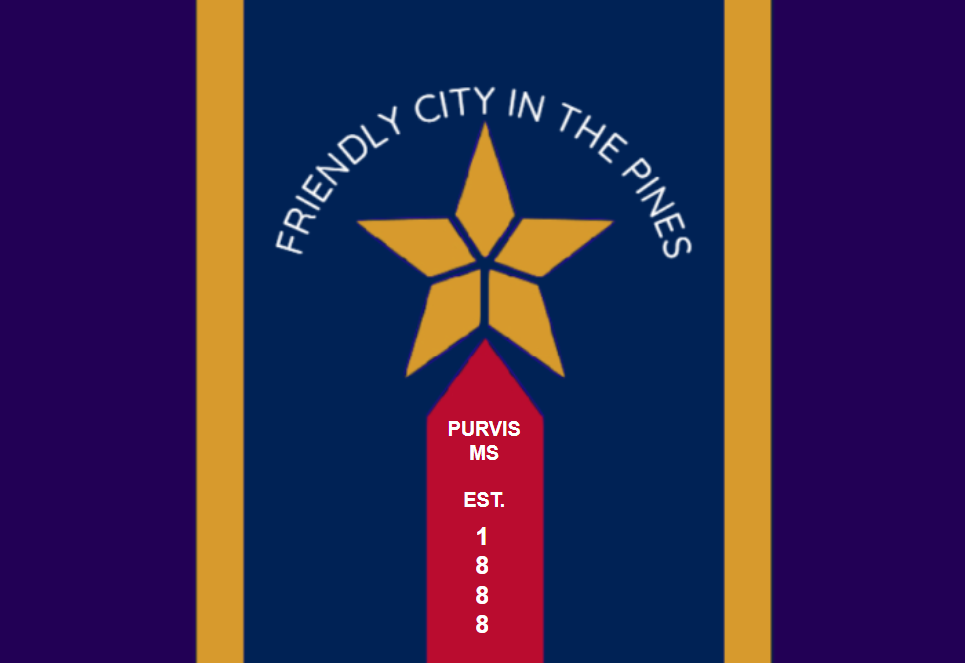
- Flag

- Location of Purvis, Mississippi
- Coordinates: 31°8′33″N 89°24′28″W
- Country: United States
- State: Mississippi
- County: Lamar

Government
  - Mayor: Roger H. Herrin
  - Alderman: Ward 1: Nancy Pylant; Ward 2: Vernon Hartfield; Ward 3: Allen Stuart; Ward 4: John W. Jordan; At-Large: Milton Bourn
  - State Senator: John Polk (R)
  - State Representative: Ken Morgan
  - U.S. Rep.: Mike Ezell (R)

Area
  - Total: 4.20 sq mi (10.88 km^{2})
  - Land: 4.19 sq mi (10.85 km^{2})
  - Water: 0.012 sq mi (0.03 km^{2})
- Elevation: 387 ft (118 m)

Population (2020)
  - Total: 1,909
  - Density: 455.8/sq mi (175.98/km^{2})
- Time zone: UTC-6 (Central (CST))
  - Summer (DST): UTC-6 (CDT)
- ZIP code: 39475
- Area code: 601
- FIPS code: 28-60480
- GNIS feature ID: 0676425

Purvis is a U.S. city in and the county seat of Lamar County, Mississippi. It is part of the Hattiesburg, Mississippi Metropolitan Statistical Area. As of the 2020 census, Purvis had a population of 1,909. The Town of Purvis was incorporated on February 25, 1888 and was founded by and named after Thomas Melville Purves, originally of Marion County, Alabama. Purves, born March 8, 1820, was a second generation Scottish-American; his grandfather emigrated to Charleston, South Carolina in 1765.

== History ==
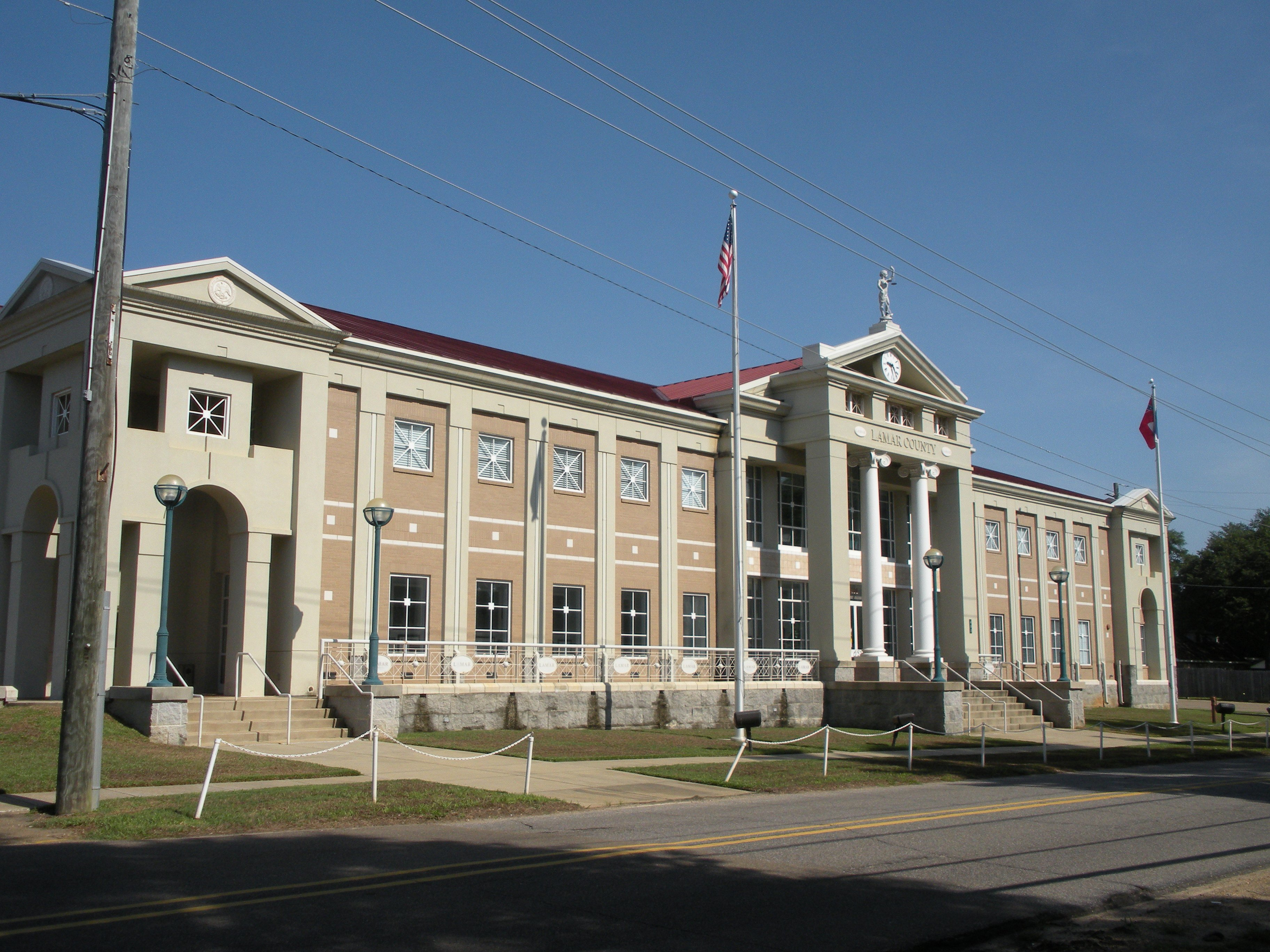
New Lamar County Courthouse

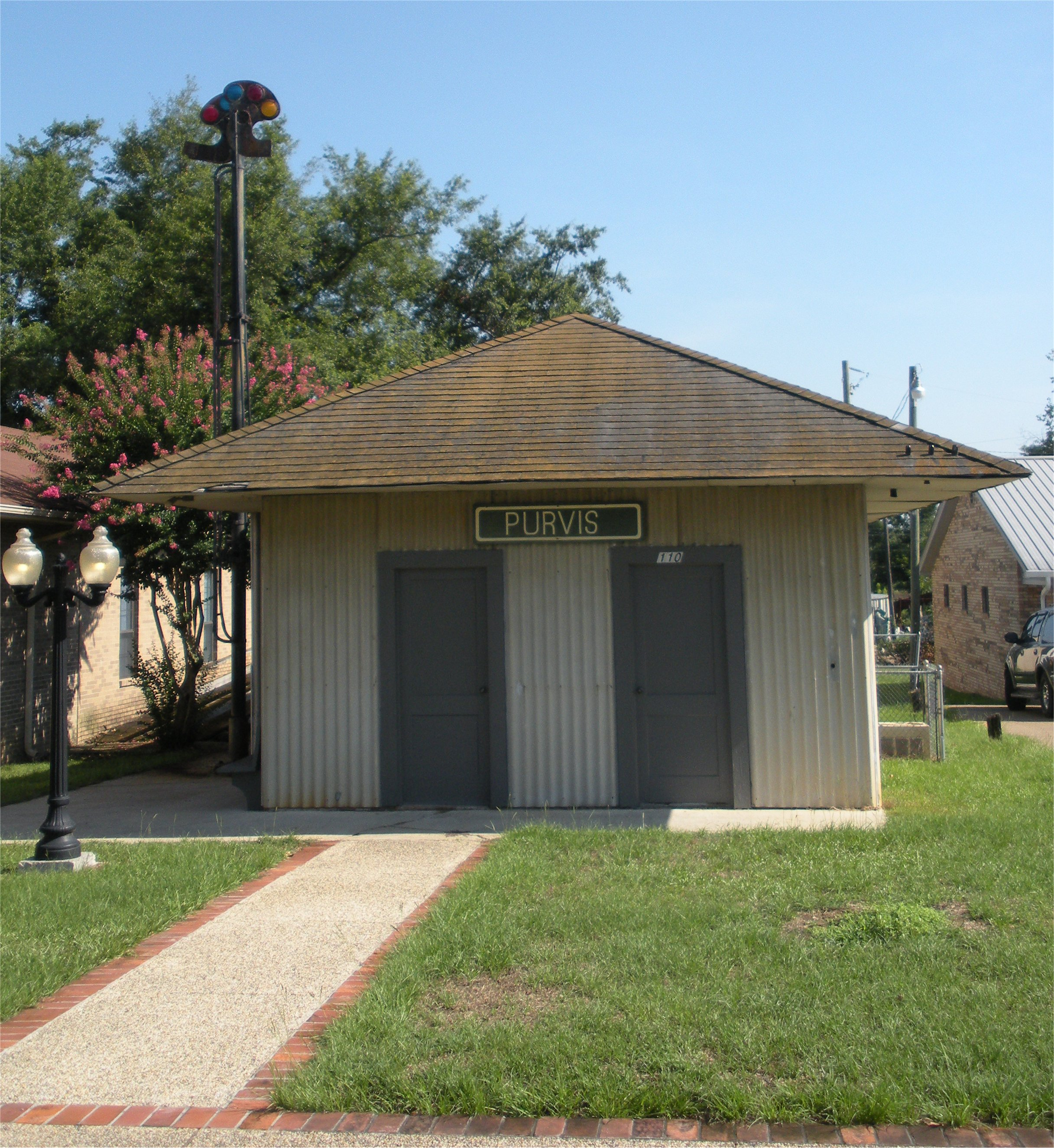
Historic Purvis Depot

Purves acquired a land grant in 1870 for a parcel of real estate which was located, at that time, in Marion County, Mississippi. In 1871, Purves moved from his home in Greene County and homesteaded the 160 acres (0.65 km^{2}), along with his wife, Dorothy Abney, born May 14, 1826, in Hinds County, and their five surviving children, to the rural property. Dorothy, also known as Dollie or Dolly, was a doctor who tended the sick of the area and delivered babies. Purves built a two-room log cabin for his family with an open fireplace in one room used for cooking and heating. John, Thomas Purves' third surviving child, was the town's first Mayor.

In 1884, the New Orleans and Northeastern Railroad gained right-of-way on Purves' property and a depot was erected, along with a marker, reading "Purvis". There were various recognized spellings of Scottish Clan Purves (surname) with both names previously listed being only a few of many. Purves eventually changed the spelling of his surname to match the town's depot marker which you can see evidenced on his tombstone located in Fillingame Cemetery in Purvis. Purves built and ran the first boarding house for the men who were working on laying rails for the New Orleans and Northeastern Railroad. This building was called a "section house" because that is what a house built for railroad crew was termed at that time. Mrs. Anna Bufkin was a member of one of the first families to live in the section house as her husband was one that helped grade and build that part of the railroad in Purvis. There were around fifty men in the crew working in that area and the water supply was inadequate for that many additional people. They found a second source of water from a spring across the railroad track that was originally used by Thomas Purves (Grandpa Purvis) years before the town sprang into existence.

Lamar became a county on February 19, 1904, in House Bill 166 and was formed from the second Judicial District of Marion County. The county was named after Lucius Quintus Cincinnatus Lamar II, who was elected to Mississippi Congress in 1872 and has one county each in Mississippi, Alabama and Georgia named after him. The town of Purvis was designated as the county seat of the county Lamar with the depot of the New Orleans and Northeastern Railroad listed as the town's center and the lines to run with the cardinal points of the compass.

Purvis began as a sawmill town and is noted to be located on the highest point on the Southern Railroad between Meridian and New Orleans by James Bounds, land surveyor, MS REG # L.S.1021. The first homesteaders of the area farmed and would only have to make 2-3 trips to "town" for supplies a year. The best route and the trading post most used was the Pass Christian trading post, some ninety miles south of the area which took eleven days in ox-cart to travel.

James Bounds, surveyor, stated:

It may be of interest to note the location of the old Pass Christian Road on a map of Stone and Pearl River Counties. This road was used very much by the early settlers of Lamar County to travel south to the coast for supplies. This road followed a natural divide between the water-sheds of Wolf River and Big Black Creek, of which the head waters originate in Lamar County. This road was one of necessity. It crossed no branches or streams of any kind and was one of the main roads of travel until modern means of transportation came into use after the American Civil War.

When the town was in its infancy, lumber companies bought large tracts of virgin pine forested land and erected sawmills at sites along the newly developing rail line. A special meeting of the board of supervisors was held in January 1905, for the purpose of giving a contract for a new courthouse to be built for the sum of $43,516 to P.H. Weathers (architect) of Jackson, Mississippi. This two-story brick and stone building was to replace the frame courthouse that in use at the time. The new Lamar County Courthouse was completed in 1905 at a cost of $50,000 only to be damaged by the 1908 Dixie tornado outbreak, then subsequently demolished by fire in 1934. The building was reconstructed and expanded in 1956 but has fallen into disrepair in recent years. Lamar County Administrator Chuck Bennett stated on December 30, 2008, that the courthouse is slated for a complete renovation that could cost up to $44,000,000 and could take up to four years to complete. Preliminary work began in 2006 and some items have already been paid in full, such as engineering services and an asbestos study.

== Geography ==
According to the United States Census Bureau, the city has a total area of 3.9 square miles (10 km^{2}), of which 3.9 square miles (10 km^{2}) is land and 0.25% is water. Because of a well-known system of aquifers and sand mines, this area was selected for "project dribble" to be the site of nuclear tests by the US government during 1961 to 1968 to measure seismic activity.

Purvis is part of the area known as the Pine Belt due to the overwhelming number of longleaf pine trees that populate the forests.

=== Climate ===
Purvis is located in the Deep South, in a humid subtropical area of the country with hot summers and mild winters. Located in USDA Hardiness Zone 8, the climate supports a large variety of foliage and plants. Purvis receives about 62 inches of rain annually, January being the wettest month averaging 6.63 inches (168 mm), which provides for the lush growth of native plants and trees. January is also the coldest month of the year with an average temperature of 60 degrees during the daytime and 36 degrees at night.

Summers are long, with 80 degree temperatures beginning in May or sometimes sooner, and lasting normally until the first weeks of October. Night temperatures do not usually vary greatly from daytime temperatures, usually dropping only 21 -24 degrees. Heat indexes can soar during the summer months, due to high humidity and long hours of sunshine, causing a 93 degree day to feel as if it were 101 degrees. Afternoon showers and thunderstorms are to be expected during summer months but are often short lived. July is, on average, the hottest month of the year at 92 degrees, without counting the varying heat index.

Snowfall is rare, and when it does occur it usually is only 3 inches (76 mm) or less. Purvis averages freezing temperatures only a few times a winter. The record high was in 1951 at 106 degrees and the record low in 1985 at 4 degrees. On February 23, 2016, a tornado hit Purvis, killing one.

Climate data for Purvis, Mississippi
Month	Jan	Feb	Mar	Apr	May	Jun	Jul	Aug	Sep	Oct	Nov	Dec	Year
Mean daily maximum °F (°C)	67 (19)	68 (20)	72 (22)	79 (26)	86 (30)	94 (34)	92 (33)	93 (34)	88 (31)	81 (27)	69 (21)	63 (17)	79 (26)
Mean daily minimum °F (°C)	43 (6)	44 (7)	48 (9)	53 (12)	66 (19)	69 (21)	70 (21)	70 (21)	64 (18)	52 (11)	40 (4)	39 (4)	55 (13)
Average precipitation inches (mm)	5.5 (140)	6.4 (160)	8.8 (220)	5.3 (130)	4.8 (120)	4.8 (120)	5.8 (150)	4.9 (120)	4.4 (110)	3.7 (94)	4.5 (110)	5.6 (140)	64.5 (1,640)
Source: Weatherbase

== Demographics ==
Historical population
Census	Pop.	Note	%±
1890	287		—
1900	564		96.5%
1910	724		28.4%
1920	919		26.9%
1930	881		−4.1%
1940	1,000		13.5%
1950	1,270		27.0%
1960	1,614		27.1%
1970	1,860		15.2%
1980	2,256		21.3%
1990	2,140		−5.1%
2000	2,164		1.1%
2010	2,175		0.5%
2020	1,909		−12.2%
U.S. Decennial Census

=== 2020 census ===
As of the 2020 census, Purvis had a population of 1,909. The median age was 37.4 years. 24.1% of residents were under the age of 18 and 17.0% of residents were 65 years of age or older. For every 100 females there were 93.6 males, and for every 100 females age 18 and over there were 90.8 males age 18 and over.

0.0% of residents lived in urban areas, while 100.0% lived in rural areas.

There were 743 households in Purvis, including 496 family households. Of all households, 33.6% had children under the age of 18 living in them. Of all households, 37.6% were married-couple households, 17.2% were households with a male householder and no spouse or partner present, and 40.1% were households with a female householder and no spouse or partner present. About 29.8% of all households were made up of individuals and 13.1% had someone living alone who was 65 years of age or older.

There were 863 housing units, of which 13.9% were vacant. The homeowner vacancy rate was 2.4% and the rental vacancy rate was 8.5%.

Purvis racial composition as of 2020
Race	Num.	Perc.
White (non-Hispanic)	1,274	66.74%
Black or African American (non-Hispanic)	491	25.72%
Native American	3	0.16%
Asian	2	0.1%
Pacific Islander	2	0.1%
Other/Mixed	65	3.4%
Hispanic or Latino	72	3.77%

== Government ==
The United States Postal Service operates the Purvis Post Office in Purvis.

The Mississippi Department of Mental Health operates the South Mississippi State Hospital in unincorporated Lamar County, near Purvis.

== Education ==
The Purvis School System's mascot is a tornado as a testament of the courage of those who endured the Tornadoes of 1908, which changed the face of the emerging town, and in honor of those who lost their lives that day.

The city of Purvis is serviced by the Lamar County School District, which includes the following:

- Purvis Lower Elementary School K-2
- Purvis Upper Elementary School 3-5
- Purvis Middle School 6-8
- Purvis High School 9-12

Private Schools include:

- Lamar Christian School
- Bass Memorial Academy

== Infrastructure ==
Highways include:

- I-59
- US 11
- MS 589

== Notable people ==
- William Andrews III, former member of the Mississippi House of Representatives
- Lacey Chabert, film and television actress.
- Lillian McMurry, record producer and owner of Trumpet Records
- Johnny Rawls, soul blues singer and guitarist
- Willie Shelby, collegiate and NFL football player.
- Ronald J. Slay, first head football coach for the University of Southern Mississippi
- Walter Young, major league baseball player.
