= Chicwillasaw Creek =

Stream in Mississippi, United States

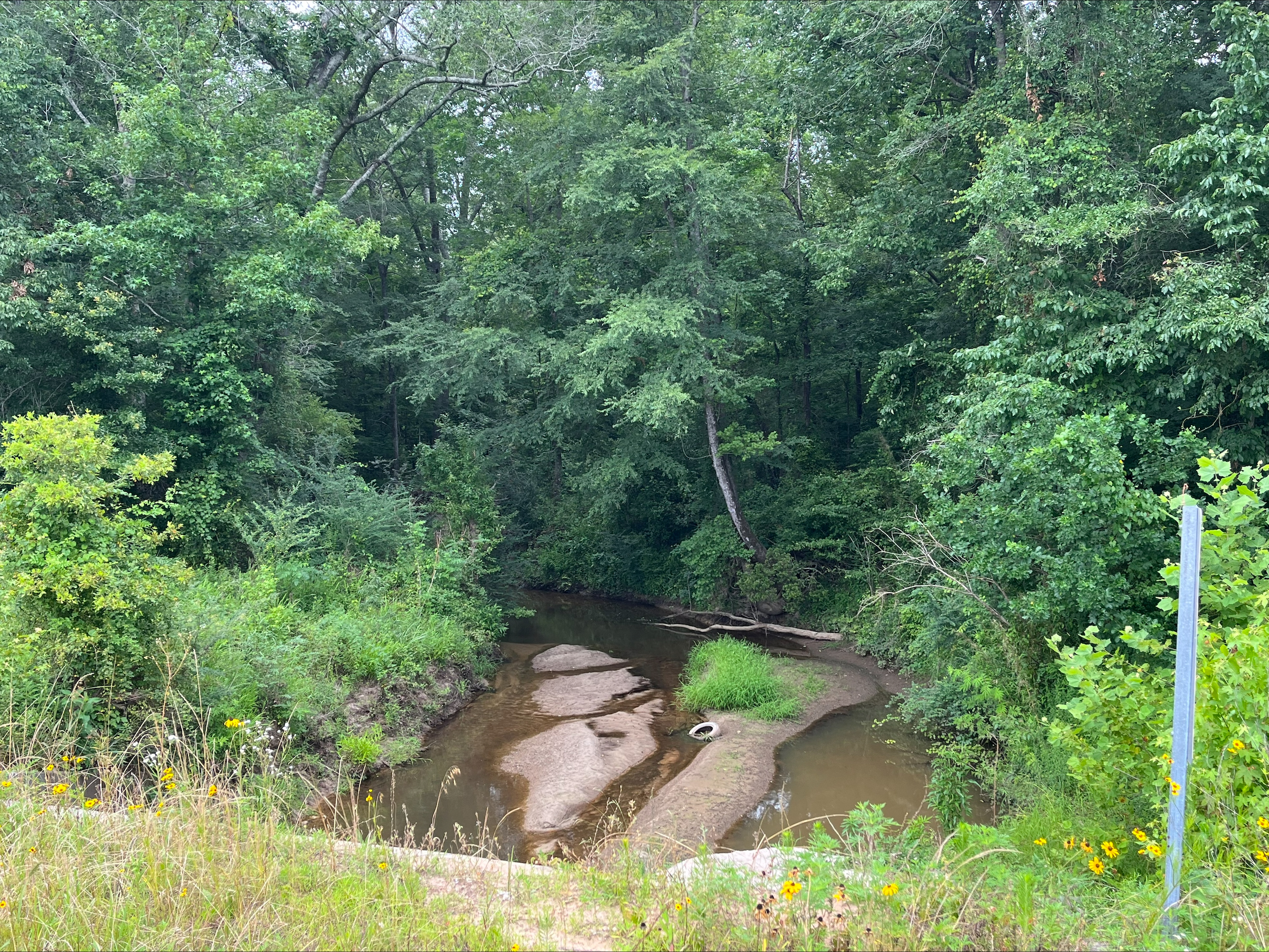
- Chicwillasaw Creek in Jones County

Location
- Country: United States
- State: Mississippi

Physical characteristics
- Source
  - coordinates: 32.0911111°N 89.9816667°W
- Mouth
  - coordinates: 32.0668348°N 88.8865334°W
- Length: 6.9 mi (11.1 km)

Chicwillasaw Creek is a stream in the U.S. state of Mississippi. It is a tributary to Souenlovie Creek.

Chicwillasaw is a name derived from the Choctaw language meaning "deserted house". A variant name is "Chukillissa Creek".
