= Sandersville, Mississippi =

- Town
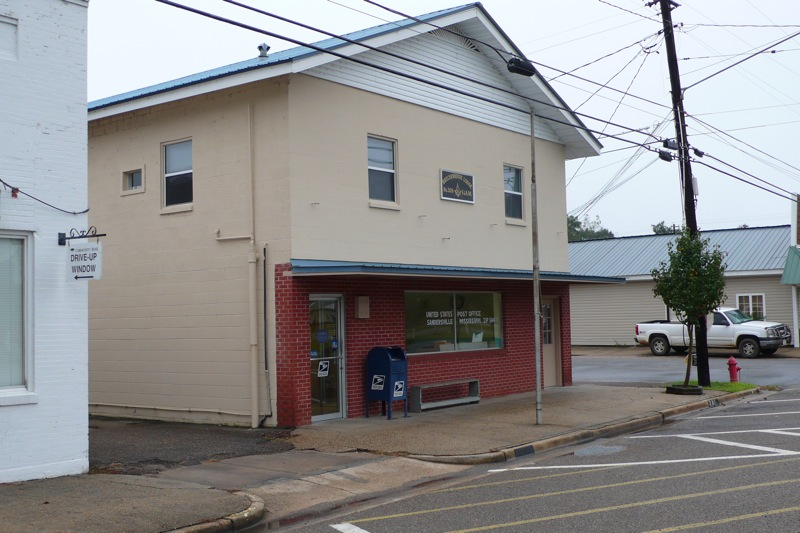
- The U.S. Post Office in Sandersville, Mississippi

- Location of Sandersville, Mississippi

- Location in the United States
- Coordinates: 31°47′8″N 89°2′4″W
- Country: United States
- State: Mississippi
- County: Jones

Area
  - Total: 4.99 sq mi (12.92 km^{2})
  - Land: 4.95 sq mi (12.82 km^{2})
  - Water: 0.039 sq mi (0.10 km^{2})
- Elevation: 276 ft (84 m)

Population (2020)
  - Total: 636
  - Density: 128/sq mi (49.6/km^{2})
- Time zone: UTC-6 (Central (CST))
  - Summer (DST): UTC-5 (CDT)
- ZIP code: 39477
- Area code: 601
- FIPS code: 28-64920
- GNIS feature ID: 0677364

Sandersville is a town in Jones County, Mississippi, United States. The population was 636 at the 2020 census, down from 731 at the 2010 census. It is part of the Laurel micropolitan area.

== History ==
Scottish settlers migrated here during the 1820s and built the Good Hope Presbyterian Church. In 1855, the town was named after the Sanders, a pioneer family.

Home construction was influenced by the Victorian era, as there are a noticeable number of cupolas on buildings in the town.

Hunt Refining Company has a refinery northeast of Sandersville which processes crude oil acquired primarily from local Mississippi fields. The refinery produces distillate feedstock, paving grade asphalt, heavy gas oils, naphtha, and roofing grade asphalt.

== Geography ==
Sandersville is located in northeastern Jones County at 31°47′8″N 89°2′4″W (31.785455, -89.034572). U.S. Route 11 (Front Street) passes through the center of town, leading southwest 9 miles (14 km) to Laurel, the county's largest city, and northeast 10 miles (16 km) to Stafford Springs. Interstate 59 passes just west of the town limits, with access from Exit 104 (West Main Street). I-59 leads northeast 48 miles (77 km) to Meridian and southwest 39 miles (63 km) to Hattiesburg.

According to the United States Census Bureau, Sandersville has a total area of 5.0 square miles (12.9 km^{2}), of which 0.04 square miles (0.1 km^{2}), or 0.77%, is water.

== Demographics ==
Historical population
Census	Pop.	Note	%±
1900	357		—
1910	604		69.2%
1920	559		−7.5%
1930	565		1.1%
1940	562		−0.5%
1950	681		21.2%
1960	657		−3.5%
1970	694		5.6%
1980	800		15.3%
1990	853		6.6%
2000	789		−7.5%
2010	731		−7.4%
2020	636		−13.0%
U.S. Decennial Census

Sandersville racial composition as of 2020 (NH = Non-Hispanic) (Note: Note: the US Census treats Hispanic/Latino as an ethnic category. This table excludes Latinos from the racial categories and assigns them to a separate category. Hispanics/Latinos can be of any race.)
Race	Number	Percentage
White (NH)	530	83.33%
Black or African American (NH)	42	6.6%
Native American or Alaska Native (NH)	29	4.56%
Asian (NH)	1	0.16%
Mixed/Multi-Racial (NH)	25	3.93%
Hispanic or Latino	9	1.42%
Total	636	

As of the 2020 United States census, there were 636 people, 268 households, and 218 families residing in the town.

As of the census of 2000, there were 789 people, 317 households, and 231 families residing in the town. The population density was 159.2 inhabitants per square mile (61.5/km^{2}). There were 350 housing units at an average density of 70.6 per square mile (27.3/km^{2}). The racial makeup of the town was 92.14% White, 6.84% African American, 0.89% Native American, and 0.13% from two or more races. Hispanic or Latino of any race were 0.13% of the population.

There were 317 households, out of which 31.9% had children under the age of 18 living with them, 56.8% were married couples living together, 12.9% had a female householder with no husband present, and 27.1% were non-families. 23.3% of all households were made up of individuals, and 13.6% had someone living alone who was 65 years of age or older. The average household size was 2.49 and the average family size was 2.94.

In the town, the population was spread out, with 23.2% under the age of 18, 9.8% from 18 to 24, 28.1% from 25 to 44, 22.2% from 45 to 64, and 16.7% who were 65 years of age or older. The median age was 39 years. For every 100 females, there were 92.9 males. For every 100 females age 18 and over, there were 84.8 males.

The median income for a household in the town was $26,538, and the median income for a family was $34,167. Males had a median income of $27,614 versus $20,313 for females. The per capita income for the town was $14,429. About 12.8% of families and 16.2% of the population were below the poverty line, including 18.3% of those under age 18 and 28.9% of those age 65 or over.

== Education ==
Sandersville is served by the Jones County School District.

Jones County is in the zone of Jones College.

== Notable people ==
- Doug Satcher, former National Football League linebacker
- Shad White, State Auditor of Mississippi
