= Stafford Springs, Mississippi =

- Unincorporated community
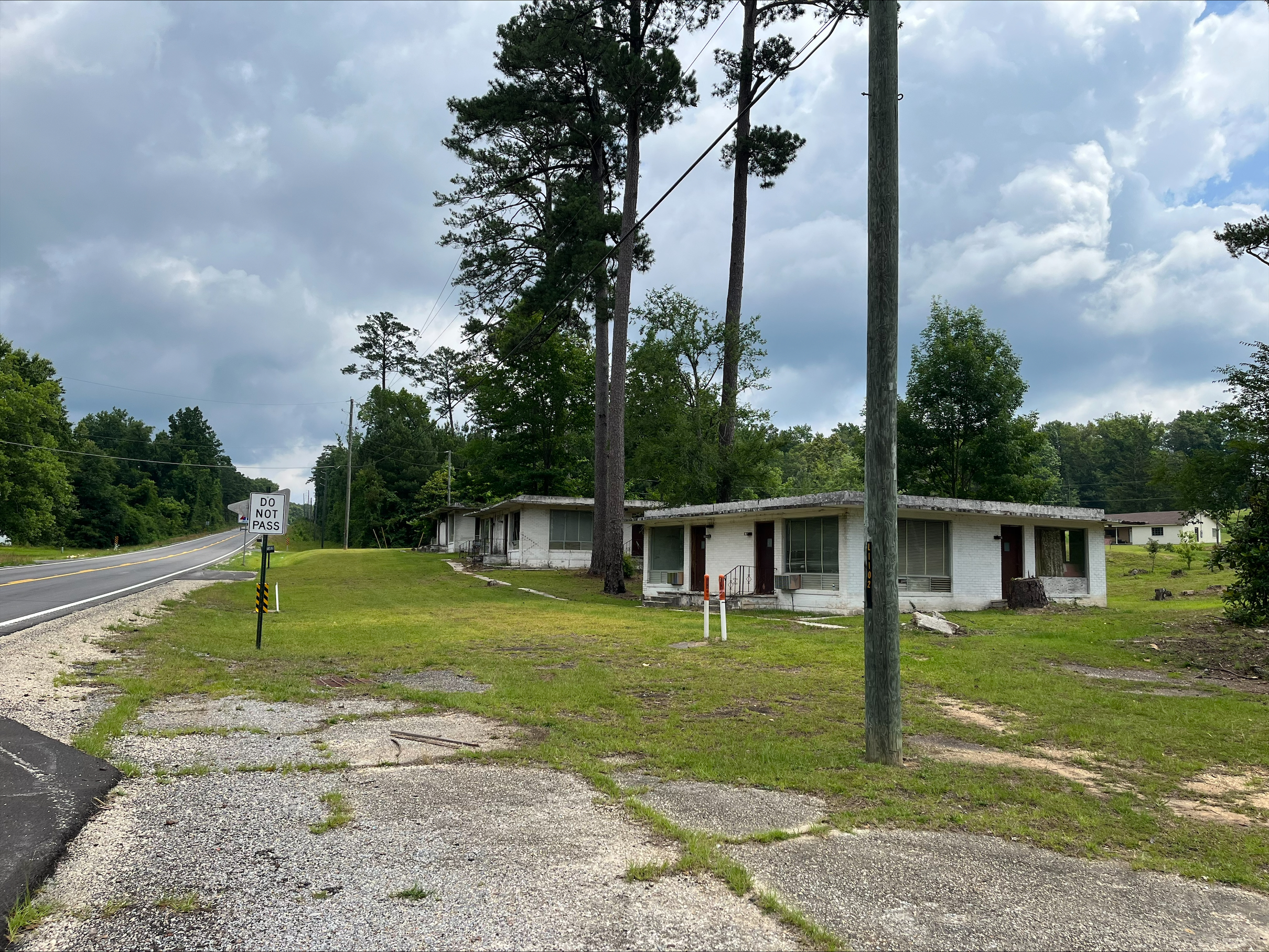
- Abandoned buildings that were part of the Stafford Springs Motor Lodge

- Location within Mississippi Location within the United States
- Coordinates: 31°54′18″N 88°56′00″W
- Country: United States
- State: Mississippi
- County: Jasper
- Elevation: 413 ft (126 m)
- Time zone: UTC-6 (Central (CST))
  - Summer (DST): UTC-5 (CDT)
- Area codes: 601 & 769
- GNIS feature ID: 678203

Stafford Springs, Mississippi is an unincorporated community located in Jasper County, Mississippi, United States, along U.S. Route 11.

== History ==
The community was named for Edward Stafford, who settled in the area in the late 19th century. Stafford was alerted to the presence of a mineral spring in the area by Choctaws, who took their wounded and sick there for its purported healing powers.

On May 19, 1892, the Stafford Mineral Springs and Hotel Company was organized in New Orleans. A bottling works was founded the next year, and the spring water was soon shipped throughout the country. The Stafford Springs Hotel opened in 1899. The shareholders sold the company in 1918, and visitors stopped arriving to the springs during the Great Depression. The hotel continued to be opened yearly from April to September. In 1952, the Stafford Springs Hotel was demolished. The area was then briefly used for a dude ranch.

The Mississippi Art Colony was located in Stafford Springs from 1962 to 1970.

A post office operated under the name Stafford Springs from 1919 to 1955.
