= Black Creek Wilderness =

Wilderness area in Mississippi, US

- IUCN category Ib (wilderness area)
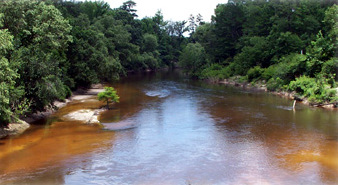
- Wild and Scenic Black Creek

- Location within the United States
- Location: Perry County, Mississippi, US
- Nearest city: Wiggins, Mississippi
- Coordinates: 30°58′47″N 089°01′41″W
- Area: 5,052 acres (20 km^{2})
- Established: 1984
- Governing body: U.S. Forest Service

Black Creek Wilderness is a 5,052-acre (20 km^{2}) wilderness area in the U.S. state of Mississippi. Located within the De Soto National Forest, Mississippi's largest wilderness lies in the broad valley of Black Creek, stained a deep caramel color by the tannic acid of decaying vegetation. The upland areas protect significant areas of longleaf pine forest, while the river creates bottomland hardwoods and shorelines with sand bars. It is therefore an important representation of typical coastal plain ecosystems that existed before forests were cleared and the rivers dammed. The Pascagoula River is nationally significant as one of the largest unimpeded rivers remaining in the lower 48 states. Rare species include the Pearl darter and the Yellow-blotched map turtle, both found only in this river and its tributaries. This wilderness area is surrounded by De Soto National Forest, which is also one of the nation's most important areas of coastal plain ecosystems.

== Wild and Scenic River ==
Black Creek, a tributary of the Pascagoula River, is Mississippi's only designated National Wild and Scenic River. Designated in 1986, 21 miles (34 km) of the creek are classified as "scenic".

Black Creek bisects Black Creek Wilderness, creating a hardwood floodplain of oxbow lakes and thick stands of sweet gum, sweet bay, red maple, oak, pine, and bald cypress. These represent the sort of forests that form when natural levels of water, including spring flooding and summer drought, control the distribution of species.

== Recreation ==
The primary recreational uses of the Wild and Scenic reach of Black Creek include fishing, hiking, hunting, swimming, camping, and floating. White sandbars along the creek are commonly used for picnicking and primitive camping. Canoeing is a popular way to explore the corridor; several public landings provide boat access. The 41-mile (66 km) Black Creek Trail follows the creek drainage, with about 10 miles (16 km) passing through the wilderness. Summer weekends are the busiest season for day trips and floating.

== See also ==
- List of U.S. Wilderness Areas
- Wilderness Act
