= Russell, Mississippi =

- Unincorporated community
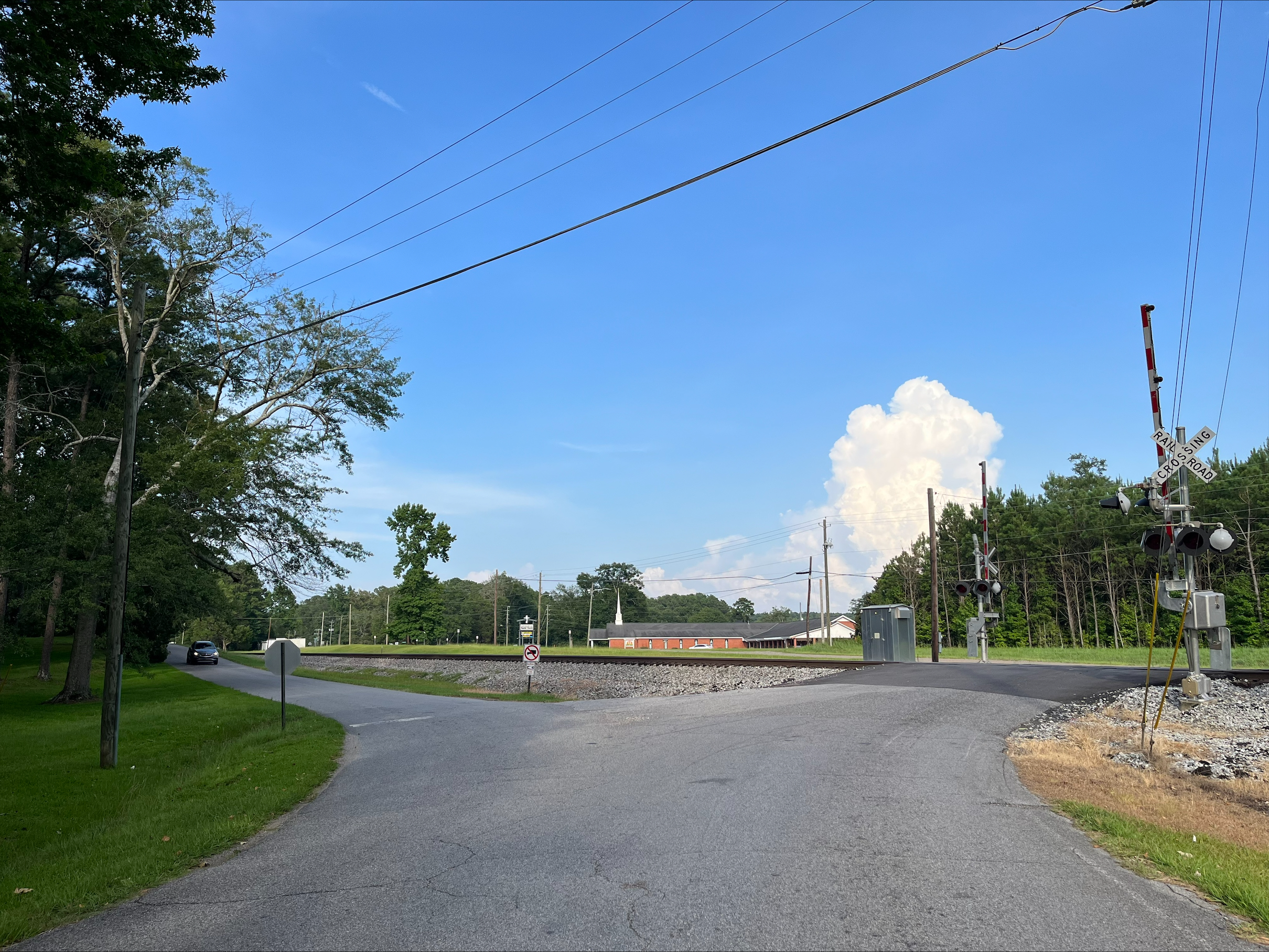
- Norfolk Southern Railway crossing and Russell Baptist Church in Russell

- Location within Mississippi Location within the United States
- Coordinates: 32°24′41″N 88°35′38″W
- Country: United States
- State: Mississippi
- County: Lauderdale
- Elevation: 420 ft (130 m)
- Time zone: UTC-6 (Central (CST))
  - Summer (DST): UTC-5 (CDT)
- ZIP code: 39301
- Area code: 601
- GNIS feature ID: 676963

Russell is an unincorporated community located in Lauderdale County, Mississippi. Russell is 7 miles (11 km) east-northeast of Meridian and approximately 5.1 miles (8.2 km) west-southwest of Toomsuba on U.S. Route 80 and is part of Meridian, Mississippi Micropolitan Statistical Area. A post office operated under the name Russell from 1867 to 1976.
