= Runnelstown, Mississippi =

- Census-designated place
- Location within Mississippi Location within the United States
- Coordinates: 31°22′33″N 89°06′42″W
- Country: United States
- State: Mississippi
- County: Perry

Area
  - Total: 1.90 sq mi (4.91 km^{2})
  - Land: 1.90 sq mi (4.91 km^{2})
  - Water: 0 sq mi (0.00 km^{2})
- Elevation: 157 ft (48 m)

Population (2020)
  - Total: 320
  - Density: 168.7/sq mi (65.14/km^{2})
- Time zone: UTC-6 (Central (CST))
  - Summer (DST): UTC-5 (CDT)
- ZIP code: 39465 and 39476
- Area code: 601
- GNIS feature ID: 694631

Runnelstown is a census-designated place and unincorporated community located in Perry County, Mississippi.

A post office operated in Runnelstown from 1909 to 1914.

Per the 2020 Census, the population was 320.

== Demographics ==
Historical population
Census	Pop.	Note	%±
2020	320		—
U.S. Decennial Census; 2020

Runnelstown was first listed as a census designated place in the 2020 U.S. census.

=== 2020 census ===
Runnelstown CDP, Mississippi – Racial and ethnic composition Note: the US Census treats Hispanic/Latino as an ethnic category. This table excludes Latinos from the racial categories and assigns them to a separate category. Hispanics/Latinos may be of any race.
Race / Ethnicity (NH = Non-Hispanic)	Pop 2020	% 2020
White alone (NH)	296	92.50%
Black or African American alone (NH)	8	2.50%
Native American or Alaska Native alone (NH)	3	0.94%
Asian alone (NH)	9	2.81%
Pacific Islander alone (NH)	0	0.00%
Some Other Race alone (NH)	0	0.00%
Mixed Race/Multi-Racial (NH)	1	0.31%
Hispanic or Latino (any race)	3	0.94%
Total	320	100.00%

== Education ==
It is in the Perry County School District.

The county is in the zone for Jones College.
