= Shubuta Creek =

Stream in Mississippi, United States

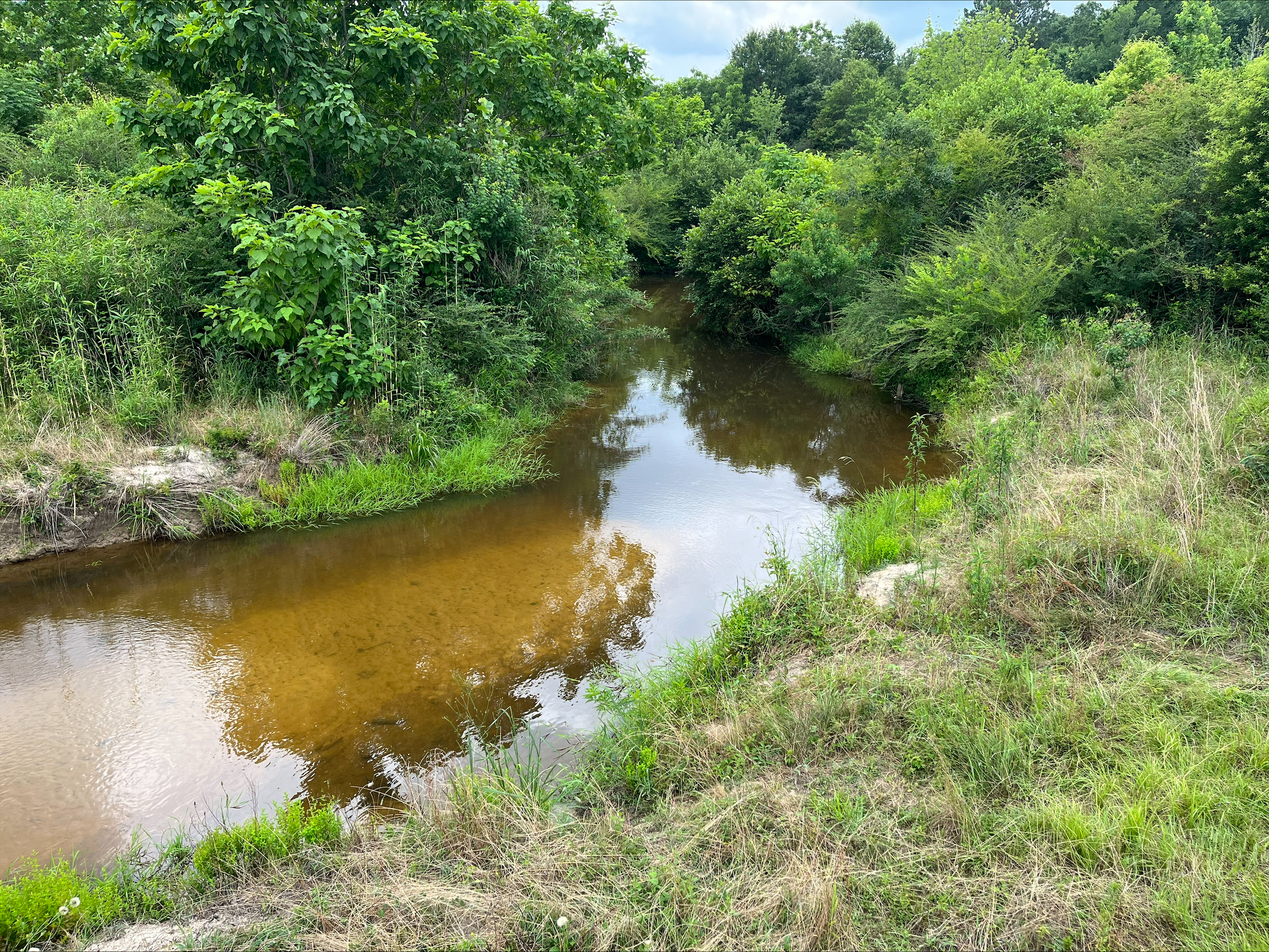
- Shubuta Creek in Clarke County

Location
- Country: United States
- State: Mississippi

Physical characteristics
- Source
  - coordinates: 32.0298737°N 88.9989432°W
- Mouth
  - coordinates: 31.8748771°N 88.7069858°W
- Length: 20.5 mi (33.0 km)
- Basin size: 75.5 sq mi (196 km^{2})

Shubuta Creek is a stream in the U.S. state of Mississippi.

Shubuta is a name derived from the Choctaw language meaning "smoke, smoky, smoking". Variant names are "Bok Shubuta", "Cheehootee Creek", "Chobota", "Shoboti Creek", and "Shoebootee Creek".
