= Pachuta Creek =

Stream in Mississippi, U.S.

Coordinates: 32.0112622°N 88.8336594°W

Pachuta Creek is a stream in the U.S. state of Mississippi.

Pachuta is a name derived from the Choctaw language purported to mean "pigeons roost there". A variant transliteration is "Patchuta Creek".
