= Pachuta, Mississippi =

- Town
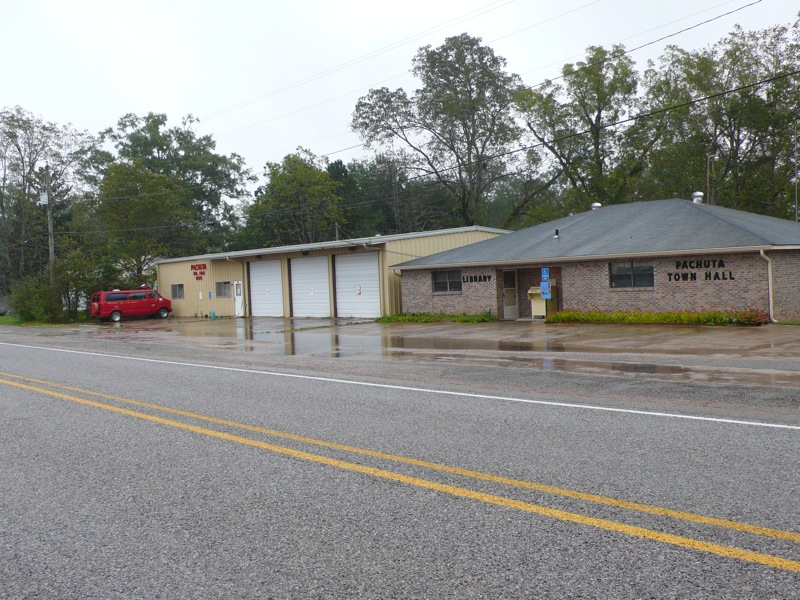
- Town hall, library, and fire department of Pachuta

- Location of Pachuta, Mississippi

- Location in the United States
- Coordinates: 32°2′28″N 88°53′1″W
- Country: United States
- State: Mississippi
- County: Clarke

Area
  - Total: 2.44 sq mi (6.32 km^{2})
  - Land: 2.44 sq mi (6.32 km^{2})
  - Water: 0 sq mi (0.00 km^{2})
- Elevation: 282 ft (86 m)

Population (2020)
  - Total: 207
  - Density: 84.9/sq mi (32.77/km^{2})
- Time zone: UTC-6 (Central (CST))
  - Summer (DST): UTC-5 (CDT)
- ZIP code: 39347
- Area code: 601
- FIPS code: 28-54960
- GNIS feature ID: 0675371

Pachuta is a town in Clarke County, Mississippi, United States. As of the 2020 census, Pachuta had a population of 207.

== History ==
Pachuta was founded in the 1880s, and named after Pachuta Creek.

== Geography ==
Pachuta is located in western Clarke County at 32°2′28″N 88°53′1″W (32.041081, -88.883636). U.S. Route 11 passes through the center of town, leading north 27 miles (43 km) to Meridian and south 29 miles (47 km) to Laurel. Mississippi Highway 18 crosses US 11 at the town center, leading east 13 miles (21 km) to Quitman, the county seat (taking Highway 512 cuts the distance to 10 mi or 16 km), and west 31 miles (50 km) to Bay Springs. Exit 126 of Interstate 59 is 2 miles (3 km) northwest of town on Highway 18.

According to the United States Census Bureau, the town has a total area of 2.4 square miles (6.3 km^{2}), all land.

== Demographics ==
Historical population
Census	Pop.	Note	%±
1900	131		—
1910	187		42.7%
1920	332		77.5%
1930	338		1.8%
1940	313		−7.4%
1950	273		−12.8%
1960	271		−0.7%
1970	271		0.0%
1980	256		−5.5%
1990	268		4.7%
2000	245		−8.6%
2010	261		6.5%
2020	207		−20.7%
U.S. Decennial Census

=== 2020 census ===
Pachuta racial composition (NH = Non-Hispanic) (Note: Note: the US Census treats Hispanic/Latino as an ethnic category. This table excludes Latinos from the racial categories and assigns them to a separate category. Hispanics/Latinos can be of any race.)
Race	Number	Percentage
White (NH)	120	57.97%
Black or African American (NH)	76	36.71%
Native American or Alaska Native (NH)	1	0.48%
Mixed/Multi-Racial (NH)	7	3.38%
Hispanic or Latino	3	1.45%
Total	207	

As of the 2020 United States census, there were 207 people, 78 households, and 43 families residing in the town.

=== 2000 census ===
As of the census of 2000, there were 245 people, 106 households, and 71 families residing in the town. The population density was 107.0 inhabitants per square mile (41.3/km^{2}). There were 126 housing units at an average density of 55.0 per square mile (21.2/km^{2}). The racial makeup of the town was 66.12% White, 33.06% African American, 0.82% from other races.

There were 106 households, out of which 24.5% had children under the age of 18 living with them, 48.1% were married couples living together, 17.9% had a female householder with no husband present, and 32.1% were non-families. 28.3% of all households were made up of individuals, and 14.2% had someone living alone who was 65 years of age or older. The average household size was 2.31 and the average family size was 2.81.

In the town, the population was spread out, with 21.6% under the age of 18, 6.5% from 18 to 24, 26.9% from 25 to 44, 24.9% from 45 to 64, and 20.0% who were 65 years of age or older. The median age was 43 years. For every 100 females, there were 71.3 males. For every 100 females age 18 and over, there were 67.0 males.

The median income for a household in the town was $30,938, and the median income for a family was $35,313. Males had a median income of $26,750 versus $21,250 for females. The per capita income for the town was $12,181. About 20.0% of families and 17.8% of the population were below the poverty line, including 34.5% of those under the age of eighteen and 5.0% of those 65 or over.

== Education ==
The town of Pachuta is served by the Quitman School District.

The county is in the zone for Jones College.

== Notable person ==
- Bob Hicks, activist during the Civil Rights Movement
