= Seminary, Mississippi =

- Town
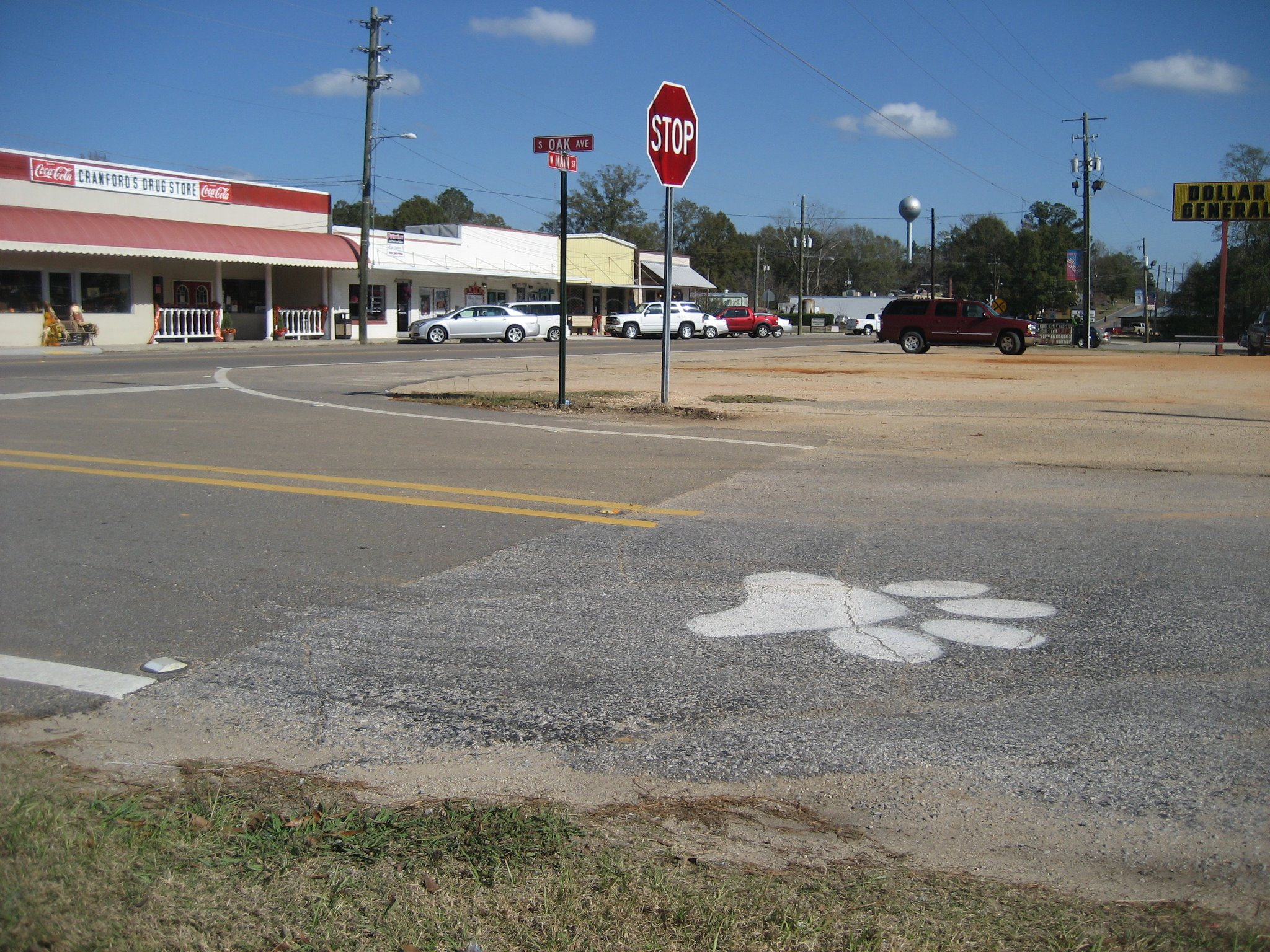
- Main Street in 2011

- Location of Seminary, Mississippi

- Location in the United States
- Coordinates: 31°33′44″N 89°29′49″W
- Country: United States
- State: Mississippi
- County: Covington

Government
  - Mayor: Rick Hux

Area
  - Total: 1.54 sq mi (3.99 km^{2})
  - Land: 1.53 sq mi (3.97 km^{2})
  - Water: 0.0077 sq mi (0.02 km^{2})
- Elevation: 253 ft (77 m)

Population (2020)
  - Total: 305
  - Density: 198.9/sq mi (76.79/km^{2})
- ZIP code: 39479
- Area code: 601
- FIPS code: 28-66400
- GNIS feature ID: 0677510

Historic photo of a school campus in Seminary

Seminary is a town in Covington County, Mississippi, United States. As of the 2020 census, Seminary had a population of 305.

Okatoma Creek, part of the Pascagoula River watershed, runs through Seminary, and is popular for canoeing and kayaking.

== History ==
=== 1846–1890 ===
The area was sparsely populated prior to the Civil War. In the same location as where the town sits today, Covington County resident and Presbyterian pastor A. R. Graves opened Zion Seminary, a boarding school for men and women, in 1845. The seminary offered courses in law, medicine, and religious studies. At its largest, the seminary had more than 500 students. Dormitories and cottages housed them. During the Civil War, all but one building of Zion Seminary burned. Local legend has it that the buildings were burned by Union sympathizers, but it is not clear if this is true. The seminary was in operation until it burned again in 1890. The site of the Zion Seminary was then used to build Seminary Attendance Center; the school still sits today upon this location in the center of town.

=== 1899: The town is born ===
In the late 1800s, across the Piney Woods region of South Mississippi, lumber companies cut the virgin timber from these areas. Towns began springing up along railroads, then the main means of transportation. The population of Seminary began to boom in the late 1800s, but when the timber had been cut, the boom continued on to the next community. In the late 1800s, the residents petitioned the state of Mississippi to incorporate into a municipality, and the charter was granted in 1899. The newborn town's citizens chose the name "Seminary" to keep alive the memory of the Zion Seminary.

=== Modern-day Seminary ===
Seminary is still a very small town, with only a handful of businesses, including stores, two banks, two doctor's offices, a pharmacy, an art studio, a hardware store, a barber shop, and one restaurant. The rural area around Seminary, however, is growing significantly. The population of the area, including the town of Seminary and the rural, unincorporated communities of Okahay, Eminence, Sanford, Lux, Foxtrot, Ora, Lone Star, and Richmond, grew by more than 10% between the 2000 and 2010 censuses

This significant growth is likely a result of a good school system and the area's proximity to Hattiesburg, which lies 10–20 minutes south of the Seminary area. New businesses are springing up on Highway 49 just outside the town's corporate limits.

== Geography ==
Seminary is located in south-central Covington County. U.S. Highway 49 passes west of the town, leading northwest 7 miles (11 km) to Collins, the county seat, and southeast 22 miles (35 km) to Hattiesburg.

According to the United States Census Bureau, the town has a total area of 1.5 square miles (3.9 km^{2}), of which 0.008 square miles (0.02 km^{2}), or 0.44%, is water. Okatoma Creek travels along the western edge of the town.

== Demographics ==
Historical population
Census	Pop.	Note	%±
1910	526		—
1920	360		−31.6%
1930	325		−9.7%
1940	291		−10.5%
1950	345		18.6%
1960	288		−16.5%
1970	269		−6.6%
1980	327		21.6%
1990	231		−29.4%
2000	335		45.0%
2010	314		−6.3%
2020	305		−2.9%
U.S. Decennial Census

=== 2010 Census ===
As of the census of 2010, there were 314 people, and 148 households. The racial makeup of the town was 94.9% White, 3.5% African American, 0.60% from other races, and 0.30% from two or more races. Hispanic or Latino of any race were 1.6% of the population.

In the town, the population was spread out, with 23.2% under the age of 18, 19.7% from 18 to 35, 18.2% from 35 to 49, 20.4% from 50 to 64, and 21.7% over age 65. For every 100 females, there were 73.6 males. For every 100 females age 18 and over, there were 73.8 males.

The median income for a household in the town was $32,500, and the median income for a family was $46,250. Males had a median income of $33,750 versus $24,250 for females. The per capita income for the town was $15,857. About 3.6% of families and 12.5% of the population were below the poverty line, including 12.3% of those under age 18 and 16.9% of those age 65 or over.

=== 2000 Census ===
As of the census of 2000, there were 335 people, 141 households, and 97 families residing in the town. The population density was 352.9 inhabitants per square mile (136.3/km^{2}). There were 150 housing units at an average density of 158.0 per square mile (61.0/km^{2}). The racial makeup of the town was 97.31% White, 1.19% African American, 0.90% from other races, and 0.60% from two or more races. Hispanic or Latino of any race were 1.19% of the population.

There were 141 households, out of which 31.2% had children under the age of 18 living with them, 56.0% were married couples living together, 12.1% had a female householder with no husband present, and 31.2% were non-families. 29.8% of all households were made up of individuals, and 17.7% had someone living alone who was 65 years of age or older. The average household size was 2.38 and the average family size was 2.96.

In the town, the population was spread out, with 26.9% under the age of 18, 6.9% from 18 to 24, 27.5% from 25 to 44, 23.0% from 45 to 64, and 15.8% who were 65 years of age or older. The median age was 38 years. For every 100 females, there were 73.6 males. For every 100 females age 18 and over, there were 73.8 males.

The median income for a household in the town was $32,500, and the median income for a family was $46,250. Males had a median income of $33,750 versus $24,250 for females. The per capita income for the town was $15,857. About 3.6% of families and 12.5% of the population were below the poverty line, including 12.3% of those under age 18 and 16.9% of those age 65 or over.

== Arts and culture ==
=== Religion ===
Churches within the town limits include St. Paul Baptist Church, Seminary Church of Christ, Seminary Methodist Church, and Grace Outreach Baptist Church.

== Government ==
On October 8, 2015, six-term Mayor Billy Karolyi, Mayor Pro-Tem David Daniels, the city clerk, and the public works director all submitted their resignations.

== Education ==
The city of Seminary is served Covington County School District. There are three schools within Seminary:

- Seminary Elementary (K–4)
- Seminary Middle School (5–8)
- Seminary High School (9–12)

== Notable people ==
- Martin Sennet Conner, governor of Mississippi (1932–1936)
- Dale Houston, country music singer-songwriter
- Sarah Cothran, singer-songwriter
