= List of United States tornadoes from November to December 2024 =

United States tornadoes from November to December 2024
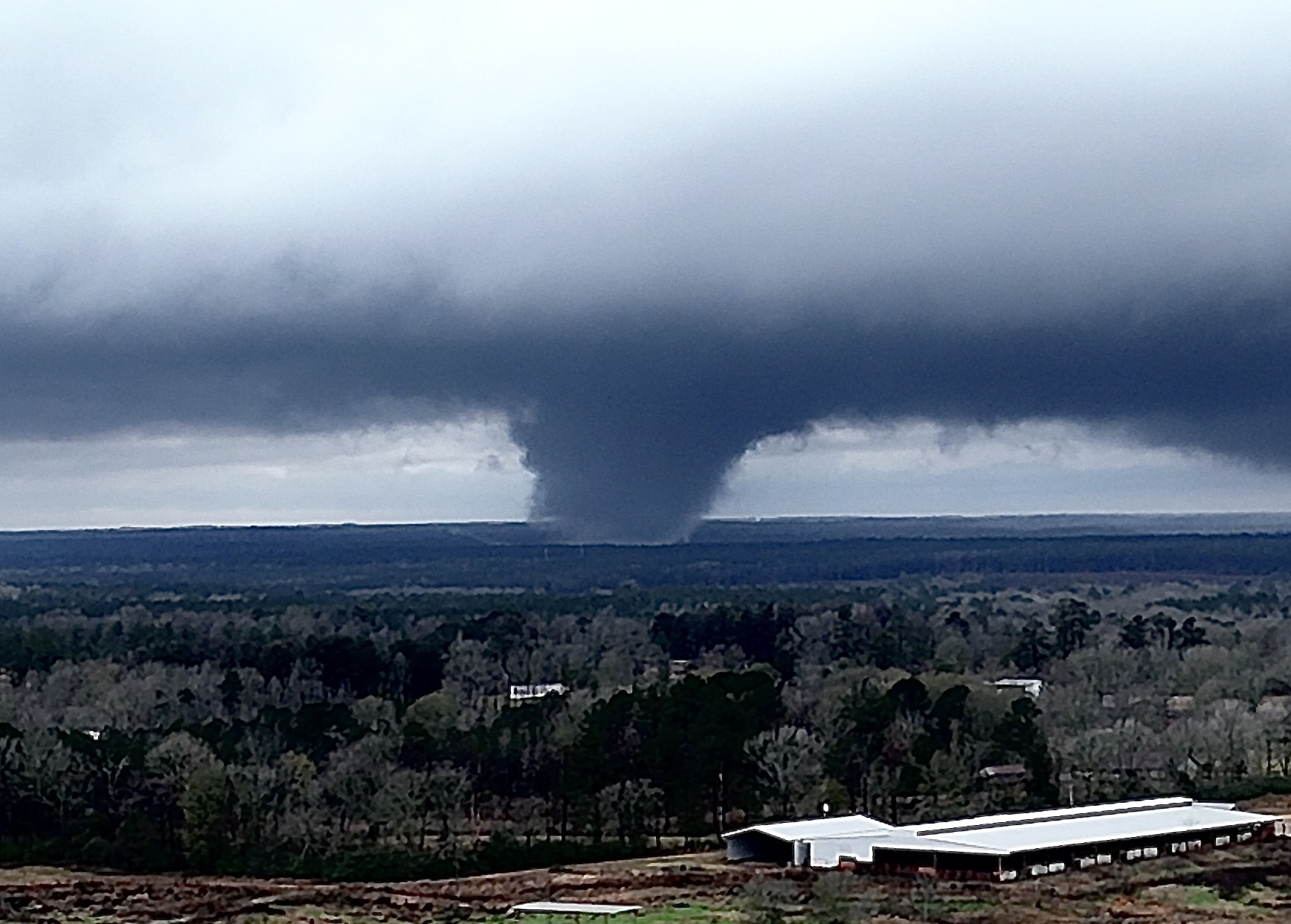
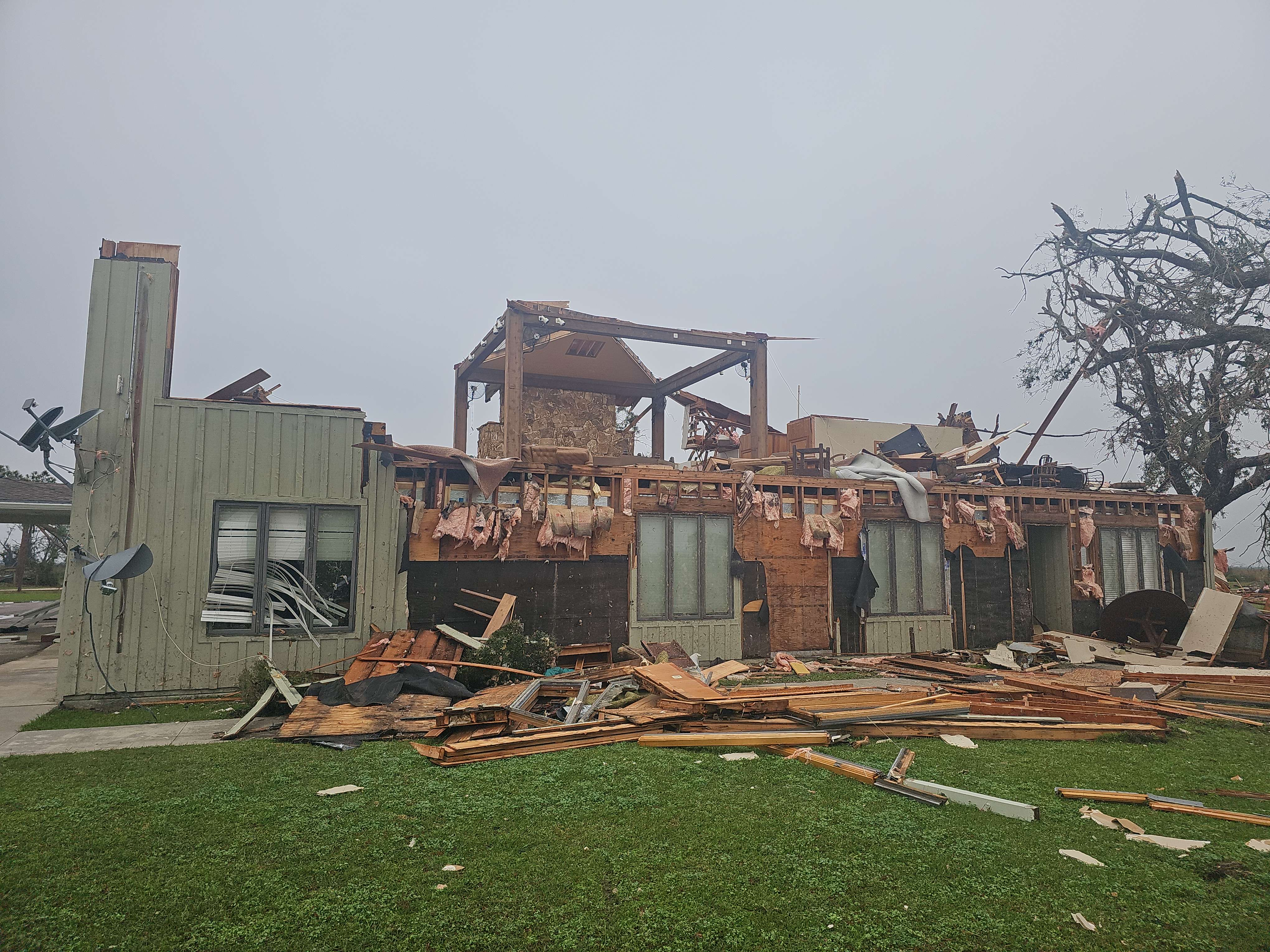
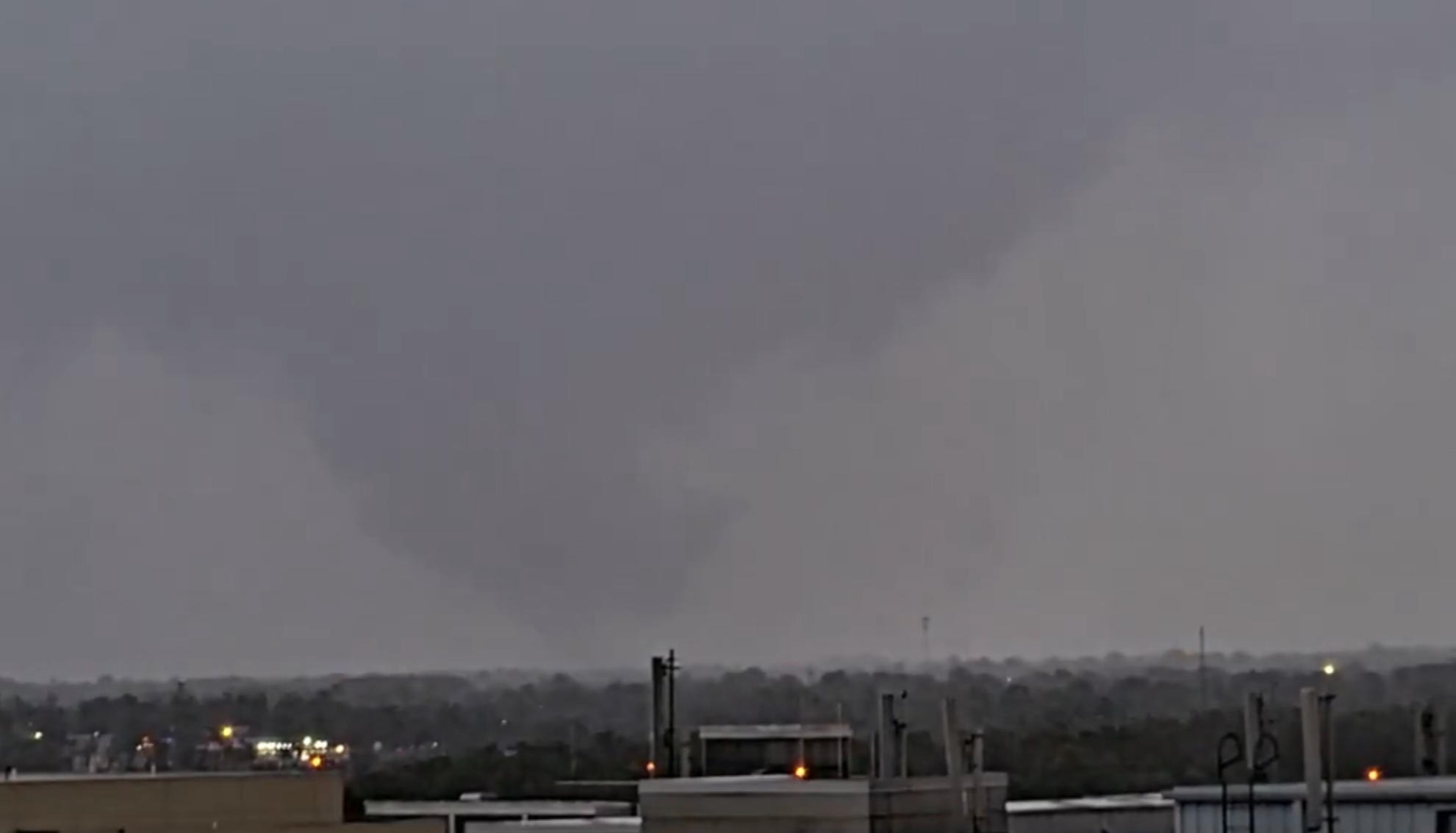
- Clockwise from top: An EF3 tornado near Bude, Mississippi on December 28; An EF2 tornado near Little Flock, Arkansas on November 4; Damage to a house after a long-tracked EF3 tornado in Texas on December 28
- Timespan: November 2 – December 29
- Maximum rated tornado: EF3 tornado: Oklahoma City, Oklahoma on November 3; Comanche, Oklahoma on November 3; Oklahoma City–Harrah, Oklahoma on November 3; Porter Heights, Texas on December 28; Chambers County, Texas on December 28; Bude, Mississippi on December 28
- Tornadoes: 194
- Fatalities: 9
- Injuries: 33

This page documents all tornadoes confirmed by various weather forecast offices of the National Weather Service in the United States during November and December 2024. Tornado counts are considered preliminary until final publication in the database of the National Centers for Environmental Information. On average, there are 54 tornadoes in November and 28 tornadoes in December. These tornadoes are more likely in the southern states due to their proximity to the unstable airmass and warm waters of the Gulf of Mexico, with occasional incursions farther north into the Midwest, particularly in November.

November ended with a slightly above average amount of 61 tornadoes, with most of them occurring in an outbreak at the beginning of the month. Much of December was quiet and well below average before two outbreaks occurred in short succession at the end of the month. The second one, which was much larger than the first one, produced at least 110 tornadoes, pushing the month to well above average. With 133 confirmed tornadoes, it was the second most active December on record, behind only 2021 (which had 227 tornadoes).

== November ==
Confirmed tornadoes by Enhanced Fujita rating
EFU	EF0	EF1	EF2	EF3	EF4	EF5	Total
19	18	18	3	3	0	0	61

=== November 2 event ===
List of confirmed tornadoes – Saturday, November 2, 2024 (Note: All dates are based on the local time zone where the tornado touched down; however, all times are in Coordinated Universal Time for consistency.)
EF#	Location	County / Parish	State	Start Coord.	Time (UTC)	Path length	Max width
EFU	NW of Eunice	Lea	NM	32.53°N 103.35°W	21:04–21:08	1.29 mi (2.08 km)	50 yd (46 m)
EFU	A weak tornado was observed over open fields near Oil Center, causing no known damage. This is the first tornado ever documented in New Mexico in the month of November.						
EFU	E of Eunice	Lea	NM	32.45°N 103.41°W	22:50–23:07	6.27 mi (10.09 km)	200 yd (180 m)
EFU	A tornado traveled slowly over open terrain, causing no damage. It was documented by numerous storm chasers.						
EF0	NNE of Wanette	Pottawatomie	OK	34.983°N 97.028°W	04:10–04:12	1 mi (1.6 km)	30 yd (27 m)
EF0	A barn was damaged.						
EFU	E of Tribbey	Pottawatomie	OK	35.08°N 96.991°W	04:24	0.3 mi (0.48 km)	30 yd (27 m)
EFU	A tornadic debris signature was noted on radar but no damage was reported.						

=== November 3 event ===
List of confirmed tornadoes – Sunday, November 3, 2024
EF#	Location	County / Parish	State	Start Coord.	Time (UTC)	Path length	Max width
EF3	Eastern Oklahoma City	Cleveland, Oklahoma	OK	35.364°N 97.438°W	06:20–06:25	2.4 mi (3.9 km)	400 yd (370 m)
EF3	This tornado developed in southeast Oklahoma City, and moved north-northeast. A number of homes were damaged, including at least one with most of the exterior walls collapsed and significant roof damage. The tornado moved through neighborhoods, damaging dozens of homes. The tornado turned more north as it approached I-240 and quickly dissipated. Six people were injured, and the tornado caused $16 million in property damage.						
EF1	S of Byers	Clay	TX	34.05°N 98.187°W	06:33–06:46	8.4 mi (13.5 km)	250 yd (230 m)
EF1	At least two homes experienced significant roof damage, a couple of barns were significantly damaged and a few large trees were snapped or uprooted.						
EFU	Midwest City	Oklahoma	OK	35.454°N 97.357°W	06:37	0.1 mi (0.16 km)	10 yd (9.1 m)
EFU	A tornadic debris signature was noted on radar but no damage could be found.						
EF3	S of Comanche to NW of Velma	Stephens	OK	34.291°N 97.969°W	07:05–07:35	21.7 mi (34.9 km)	500 yd (460 m)
EF3	This intense tornado damaged at least two dozen buildings, including a number of homes that were destroyed. Hundreds of trees were reported downed along the path as well as numerous power lines and power poles. Numerous large trees were destroyed and debarked at the tornado moved over the Comanche Golf Course and Comanche Lake. After crossing the lake, the tornado continued northeast crossing SH-7 and dissipated a few miles southwest of Lake Fuqua. Six people were injured.						
EF1	NE of Blanchard to Newcastle	McClain	OK	35.171°N 97.638°W	07:13–07:21	7 mi (11 km)	200 yd (180 m)
EF1	A high-end EF1 tornado touched down in the northern part of Blanchard and moved north-northeast. The tornado initially did some tree limb damage and damage to one house. The tornado then moved into Newcastle, damaging trees and homes as it moved through neighborhoods in town. Newcastle Elementary School received significant roof damage as the tornado continued to move north just west of US-62, where it ultimately lifted.						
EF1	ENE of Duncan to SSW of Bray	Stephens	OK	34.534°N 97.869°W	07:28–07:30	1.3 mi (2.1 km)	50 yd (46 m)
EF1	A mobile home was pushed off of its foundation.						
EF2	SW of Purdy	Stephens, Garvin	OK	34.63°N 97.65°W	07:50–07:54	4.85 mi (7.81 km)	300 yd (270 m)
EF2	This strong tornado damaged the roof of a home significantly. Multiple trees and power poles were also damaged.						
EF3	Southeastern Oklahoma City to western Harrah to Warwick	Oklahoma, Lincoln	OK	35.4°N 97.242°W	07:57–08:28	25.1 mi (40.4 km)	1,000 yd (910 m)
EF3	An intense tornado developed in southeastern Oklahoma City and then moved north and northeast causing damage to trees, power lines and a few homes. The tornado then moved through neighborhoods causing strong to intense damage throughout them. The tornado continued moving northeast across western Harrah and Horseshoe Lake producing more strong damage before weakening as it entered Lincoln County. The tornado then entered the western portion of Warwick destroying at least one mobile home and significantly damaging a couple others. A few homes suffered roof damage, and numerous trees and power poles also had damage inflicted before the tornado lifted. Seven people were injured.						
EF0	Western Norman	Cleveland	OK	35.215°N 97.513°W	07:58–08:01	1.05 mi (1.69 km)	30 yd (27 m)
EF0	A sporadic, weak tornado damaged the sunroom of a home and caused minor damage to trees.						
EF1	NNW of Elmore City	Garvin	OK	34.68°N 97.434°W	08:17–08:18	0.79 mi (1.27 km)	50 yd (46 m)
EF1	An outbuilding was destroyed, and trees and power poles were damaged.						
EF1	W of Pauls Valley	Garvin	OK	34.738°N 97.364°W	08:22–08:25	2.5 mi (4.0 km)	300 yd (270 m)
EF1	One home suffered roof damage, a barn suffered roof and siding damage, and numerous trees were damaged.						
EF1	NNE of Konawa	Seminole	OK	35.024°N 96.722°W	09:04–09:06	1 mi (1.6 km)	30 yd (27 m)
EF1	Approximately fifteen to twenty trees were snapped or uprooted.						
EF0	W of Kellyville	Creek	OK	35.916°N 96.321°W	09:46–09:52	4.6 mi (7.4 km)	400 yd (370 m)
EF0	Several outbuildings were severely damaged, a couple of trees were uprooted, numerous large tree limbs were snapped, and power poles were blown down.						
EFU	WSW of Waldron	Scott	AR	34.8914°N 94.1103°W	14:35–14:36	0.17 mi (0.27 km)	30 yd (27 m)
EFU	A tornado was recorded over open field. No known damage occurred.						
EFU	WNW of Tupelo	Coal	OK	34.626°N 96.461°W	23:15	0.3 mi (0.48 km)	30 yd (27 m)
EFU	A storm spotter reported a tornado.						
EFU	ESE of Coalgate	Coal	OK	34.516°N 96.14°W	00:39	0.5 mi (0.80 km)	50 yd (46 m)
EFU	A storm chaser observed a cone tornado. No damage was reported.						

=== November 4 event ===
List of confirmed tornadoes – Monday, November 4, 2024
EF#	Location	County / Parish	State	Start Coord.	Time (UTC)	Path length	Max width
EF0	E of Lexington	Cleveland	OK	35.019°N 97.21°W	16:26–16:28	1.3 mi (2.1 km)	30 yd (27 m)
EF0	A shed had its roof damaged.						
EF0	S of Wynnewood	Murray	OK	34.619°N 97.161°W	17:49	0.2 mi (0.32 km)	10 yd (9.1 m)
EF0	An off-duty SPC employee observed a small, weak tornado do minor damage to tree limbs.						
EF1	WSW of Sperry	Osage	OK	36.266°N 96.084°W	18:20–18:26	2.2 mi (3.5 km)	100 yd (91 m)
EF1	This tornado caused tree damage and removed much of the roof of a metal building.						
EF1	NE of Vera	Washington	OK	36.494°N 95.84°W	18:47–18:48	0.6 mi (0.97 km)	150 yd (140 m)
EF1	A roof was blown off an outbuilding, and trees were uprooted.						
EF1	NE of Vera to W of Watova	Rogers, Nowata	OK	36.508°N 95.812°W	18:49–19:04	9.6 mi (15.4 km)	400 yd (370 m)
EF1	This tornado caused tree damage and passed a Mesonet site where a wind gust of 94 mph (151 km/h) was recorded.						
EFU	SW of Plainview	Yell	AR	34.8478°N 93.4856°W	20:33–20:36	2.38 mi (3.83 km)	190 yd (170 m)
EFU	Satellite imagery showed uprooted and/or snapped trees in inaccessible areas. A tornado debris signature was also observed on two radars.						
EFU	W of Haskell	Muskogee	OK	35.8184°N 95.7505°W	20:34	0.2 mi (0.32 km)	75 yd (69 m)
EFU	A brief tornado was recorded. No damage was reported.						
EFU	SW of Webbers Falls	Muskogee	OK	35.4764°N 95.1579°W	20:42	0.1 mi (0.16 km)	75 yd (69 m)
EFU	A storm chaser recorded a brief tornado.						
EFU	SSW of Paradise Hill	Sequoyah	OK	35.5929°N 95.0705°W	20:57	0.2 mi (0.32 km)	100 yd (91 m)
EFU	A brief tornado was recorded by storm chasers as it remained over open country.						
EF2	NNE of Cookson, OK to Tenkiller, OK to NW of Norwood, AR	Cherokee (OK), Adair (OK), Washington (AR), Benton (AR)	OK, AR	35.785°N 94.861°W	21:21–22:11	32.9 mi (52.9 km)	1,200 yd (1,100 m)
EF2	This long-tracked tornado formed near Tenkiller, where tree damage occurred, and outbuildings were destroyed. More trees, outbuildings, and homes were damaged as the tornado continued to track northeast through rural Oklahoma. The tornado then reached its peak width as it approached the state line with Arkansas, where trees were uprooted before the tornado dissipated after passing over AR 16.						
EFU	NE of Oark to SW of Nail	Johnson, Newton	AR	35.7289°N 93.4415°W	22:09–22:11	0.9 mi (1.4 km)	30 yd (27 m)
EFU	A tornado debris signature was observed on three radars, but no known damage could be found due to it being in inaccessible areas.						
EF1	E of Siloam Springs	Benton	AR	36.153°N 94.488°W	22:11–22:19	4.6 mi (7.4 km)	550 yd (500 m)
EF1	This tornado developed and moved northeastward, crossing US 412 along its path. Numerous trees were uprooted, a few trees and power poles were snapped, outbuildings were destroyed, and a few homes were damaged.						
EF2	Northern Rogers to Little Flock	Benton	AR	36.351°N 94.146°W	22:53–23:02	3.8 mi (6.1 km)	375 yd (343 m)
EF2	A low-end EF2 tornado damaged trees and apartment buildings after touching down in Rogers before entering Little Flock. In Little Flock, businesses and multiple homes were damaged, and trees were uprooted. Further northeast in town, a home was severely damaged, with an outbuilding also damaged nearby, and some trees snapped. The tornado dissipated after damaging the roofs of two more homes.						
EF1	NE of Idabel to S of Broken Bow	McCurtain	OK	33.9463°N 94.7729°W	23:01–23:08	3.08 mi (4.96 km)	150 yd (140 m)
EF1	Video from a storm chaser confirmed a weak tornado that snapped the trunk of a tree and downed a few large tree limbs.						
EF1	S of Annona to NW of Avery	Red River	TX	33.5104°N 94.911°W	23:40–23:47	7.47 mi (12.02 km)	275 yd (251 m)
EF1	An erratic tornado caused damage to numerous trees, some of which had their branches snapped or were uprooted.						
EF0	N of Elsey	Stone	MO	36.8563°N 93.5548°W	00:15–00:20	1.4 mi (2.3 km)	50 yd (46 m)
EF0	The roof of an outbuilding was lifted, trees were uprooted, a storage shed had its roof tossed, and more roof damage occurred to a church and a home. Some large tree branches were snapped as well.						
EF0	SW of Sweden	Douglas	MO	36.8524°N 92.54°W	00:26–00:27	0.01 mi (0.016 km)	50 yd (46 m)
EF0	A brief tornado downed tree limbs.						
EF0	NNE of Denlow	Douglas	MO	37.0065°N 92.3536°W	00:47–00:48	0.01 mi (0.016 km)	50 yd (46 m)
EF0	Tree branches were snapped and downed.						
EF0	S of Mountain Grove	Douglas	MO	37.0596°N 92.2601°W	00:55–00:56	0.01 mi (0.016 km)	50 yd (46 m)
EF0	Small tree limbs were downed.						
EF0	W of Truxton	Montgomery	MO	38.9842°N 91.3047°W	03:28–03:30	1.87 mi (3.01 km)	25 yd (23 m)
EF0	A brief tornado produced sporadic tree damage and lofted crop debris.						
EF0	N of Foristell to N of Flint Hill	St. Charles, Lincoln	MO	38.8355°N 90.9519°W	03:39–03:49	6.08 mi (9.78 km)	75 yd (69 m)
EF0	This weak tornado damaged several trees, a pole barn, and inflicted minor damage to a residence.						

=== November 5 event ===
List of confirmed tornadoes – Tuesday, November 5, 2024
EF#	Location	County / Parish	State	Start Coord.	Time (UTC)	Path length	Max width
EF1	w of Basile	Acadia, Evangeline	LA	30.4752°N 92.6223°W	14:07–14:11	0.99 mi (1.59 km)	150 yd (140 m)
EF1	A tornado initially damaged a few trees, rolled a camper, and ripped an awning off a house. A meat market was then struck, injuring three people. A cinder block wall fell over and the market lost a quarter of its roofing. An old barn behind the market was damaged. Minor tree and power pole damage continued for a few minutes afterwards before the tornado lifted.						
EF1	N of Kaplan to S of Rayne	Vermilion, Lafayette, Acadia	LA	30.1118°N 92.3001°W	14:41–14:50	4.99 mi (8.03 km)	300 yd (270 m)
EF1	A garage was destroyed, a mobile home was shifted off its foundation, and part of the roof of a home was removed. Another old frame home was completely destroyed.						
EF0	ESE of Belknap	Davis	IA	40.803°N 92.3482°W	17:01–17:02	0.33 mi (0.53 km)	50 yd (46 m)
EF0	Two metal buildings were damaged from a high-end EF0 tornado.						

=== November 7 event ===
List of confirmed tornadoes – Thursday, November 7, 2024
EF#	Location	County / Parish	State	Start Coord.	Time (UTC)	Path length	Max width
EFU	NNW of Benoit	Runnels	TX	31.8°N 99.84°W	01:18–01:20	0.65 mi (1.05 km)	20 yd (18 m)
EFU	A tornado touched down and no damage was reported.						

=== November 10 event ===
List of confirmed tornadoes – Sunday, November 10, 2024
EF#	Location	County / Parish	State	Start Coord.	Time (UTC)	Path length	Max width
EF0	N of Middleton to N of Perrinton	Gratiot	MI	43.2193°N 84.7174°W	22:50–22:53	2.4 mi (3.9 km)	10 yd (9.1 m)
EF0	This tornado uprooted a tree which fell onto a chain-link fence and a few headstones in a cemetery, damaging them.						
EF0	Holly	Oakland	MI	42.79°N 83.62°W	23:56–23:58	1.23 mi (1.98 km)	50 yd (46 m)
EF0	A weak tornado moved through Holly, causing sporadic damage to trees and tree limbs. It also inflicted roofing loss to several facilities, damaged a construction site, and caused minor damage to siding and fascia on homes.						

=== November 11 event ===
List of confirmed tornadoes – Monday, November 11, 2024
EF#	Location	County / Parish	State	Start Coord.	Time (UTC)	Path length	Max width
EF0	Rockaway Beach	Tillamook	OR	45.6149°N 123.9435°W	05:24–05:26	0.25 mi (0.40 km)	150 yd (140 m)
EF0	This high-end EF0 originated as a waterspout and moved onshore, inflicting minor damage to the roofs and windows of buildings. Trees and fences were also damaged. One person was injured.						

=== November 18 event ===
List of confirmed tornadoes – Monday, November 18, 2024
EF#	Location	County / Parish	State	Start Coord.	Time (UTC)	Path length	Max width
EFU	N of Kirkland to NE of Childress	Childress	TX	34.44°N 100.06°W	08:35–08:45	4.6 mi (7.4 km)	unknown
EFU	While no official survey was conducted, some possible tree damage was noted along the radar-indicated path using satellite imagery. The extent of damage remains uncertain.						
EF1	WNW of Eldorado to S of Gould	Jackson, Harmon	OK	34.493°N 99.782°W	08:48–08:52	3.44 mi (5.54 km)	50 yd (46 m)
EF1	Utility poles were broken.						
EF1	SW of Gould	Harmon	OK	34.612°N 99.775°W	08:58–09:04	4 mi (6.4 km)	150 yd (140 m)
EF1	Numerous power poles were snapped and broken and several central pivot irrigation units were damaged.						
EF0	NE of Duke to SSW of Mangum	Jackson, Greer	OK	34.669°N 99.558°W	09:09–09:19	7.55 mi (12.15 km)	50 yd (46 m)
EF0	Light damage was reported.						
EFU	N of McQueen	Harmon, Greer	OK	34.746°N 99.7°W	09:11–09:14	2.72 mi (4.38 km)	30 yd (27 m)
EFU	A tornadic debris signature was noted on radar. No damage was reported.						
EF0	E of Mangum	Greer	OK	34.82°N 99.465°W	09:23–09:29	4.43 mi (7.13 km)	75 yd (69 m)
EF0	A trailer was overturned and tree limbs were damaged.						
EFU	W of Granite	Greer	OK	34.959°N 99.431°W	09:30–09:37	1.45 mi (2.33 km)	30 yd (27 m)
EFU	No damage was reported. A tornadic debris signature was observed on radar.						
EFU	S of Retrop	Kiowa	OK	35.054°N 99.356°W	09:44–09:48	3 mi (4.8 km)	30 yd (27 m)
EFU	A tornadic debris signature was noted on radar.						
EFU	SE of Retrop	Kiowa, Washita	OK	35.09°N 99.294°W	09:48–09:51	2.42 mi (3.89 km)	30 yd (27 m)
EFU	A tornado was recorded from its tornadic debris signature on radar. No damage occurred.						
EFU	E of Burns Flat	Washita	OK	35.346°N 99.084°W	10:20–10:21	1 mi (1.6 km)	50 yd (46 m)
EFU	No damage was reported.						
EF1	Western Watonga	Blaine	OK	35.829°N 98.42°W	11:36–11:38	1.66 mi (2.67 km)	100 yd (91 m)
EF1	At least five homes and two outbuildings were damaged along with trees and power poles.						

=== November 19 event ===
List of confirmed tornadoes – Tuesday, November 19, 2024
EF#	Location	County / Parish	State	Start Coord.	Time (UTC)	Path length	Max width
EF1	W of Terry	Hinds	MS	32.0835°N 90.3438°W	08:08–08:09	1.11 mi (1.79 km)	50 yd (46 m)
EF1	A few trees and a power pole were snapped. A shed was destroyed and some shingles were ripped off a home. Across the street, a porch covering and part of a roof of a home was ripped off. Another house lost a large section of roofing off of a shed and a carport awning. Several large tree limbs were also downed.						

=== November 20 event ===
List of confirmed tornadoes – Wednesday, November 20, 2024
EF#	Location	County / Parish	State	Start Coord.	Time (UTC)	Path length	Max width
EF0	Northeastern Pittsburgh	Allegheny	PA	40.4713°N 79.9113°W	22:00–22:02	1 mi (1.6 km)	75 yd (69 m)
EF0	This tornado occurred in the Lincoln–Lemington–Belmar neighborhood of Pittsburgh, sporadically downing trees, snapping tree limbs and tossing shingles.						

== December ==
Confirmed tornadoes by Enhanced Fujita rating
EFU	EF0	EF1	EF2	EF3	EF4	EF5	Total
3	50	74	3	3	0	0	133

=== December 10 event ===
List of confirmed tornadoes – Tuesday, December 10, 2024
EF#	Location	County / Parish	State	Start Coord.	Time (UTC)	Path length	Max width
EF0	WSW of Babbie	Covington	AL	31.2678°N 86.3575°W	06:06–06:07	0.3 mi (0.48 km)	20 yd (18 m)
EF0	An awning and carport were ripped off a home and some trees were uprooted. This tornado's path length may have been longer but will need to be assessed later with high-resolution satellite imagery.						

=== December 14 event ===
List of confirmed tornadoes – Saturday, December 14, 2024
EF#	Location	County / Parish	State	Start Coord.	Time (UTC)	Path length	Max width
EF1	Scotts Valley	Santa Cruz	CA	37.0483°N 122.0343°W	21:39–21:44	0.31 mi (0.50 km)	30 yd (27 m)
EF1	This tornado stripped a few trees of their branches and downed several more, knocked over power poles, overturned numerous vehicles and damaged multiple street signs in town. Three people were injured.						
EF0	NW of Zora	Benton	MO	38.2862°N 93.1104°W	21:41–21:46	1.69 mi (2.72 km)	75 yd (69 m)
EF0	An outbuilding and trees were damaged.						
EFU	NNW of Linn Creek	Camden	MO	38.0634°N 92.7322°W	22:20–22:21	0.17 mi (0.27 km)	50 yd (46 m)
EFU	A waterspout occurred over Linn Creek Cove on Lake of the Ozarks and remained over water.						

=== December 24 event ===
List of confirmed tornadoes – Tuesday, December 24, 2024
EF#	Location	County / Parish	State	Start Coord.	Time (UTC)	Path length	Max width
EF0	S of Teague	Freestone	TX	31.5321°N 96.2815°W	23:32–23:33	0.51 mi (0.82 km)	75 yd (69 m)
EF0	A brief, high-end EF0 tore a portion of a residence's roof off and a nearby outbuilding and wellhouse were damaged as well. A manufactured home was pushed slightly off its foundation and the porch roof was damaged. Some large limbs on trees were also damaged before the tornado dissipated in an open field.						

=== December 26 event ===
List of confirmed tornadoes – Thursday, December 26, 2024
EF#	Location	County / Parish	State	Start Coord.	Time (UTC)	Path length	Max width
EF1	ENE of El Campo	Wharton	TX	29.2159°N 96.2288°W	20:15–20:20	0.51 mi (0.82 km)	50 yd (46 m)
EF1	A well-constructed barn was destroyed.						
EF1	Southwestern Houston	Harris	TX	29.67°N 95.59°W	21:30–21:31	0.05 mi (0.080 km)	25 yd (23 m)
EF1	This brief tornado damaged a couple of residential homes.						
EF0	N of Dayton Lakes	Liberty	TX	30.25°N 94.92°W	21:44–21:52	6.87 mi (11.06 km)	25 yd (23 m)
EF0	Some manufactured homes and trees were damaged.						
EF0	Northeastern Houston to Huffman	Harris	TX	30.02°N 95.12°W	21:51–21:54	2.11 mi (3.40 km)	25 yd (23 m)
EF0	A tornado was observed but no damage was found.						
EF0	N of Eastgate	Liberty	TX	30.07°N 95.02°W	22:04–22:09	1.11 mi (1.79 km)	25 yd (23 m)
EF0	No damage was found after a tornado was spotted over open land.						
EF1	SSW of Zwolle	Sabine	LA	31.5144°N 93.7087°W	23:49–23:33	1.85 mi (2.98 km)	220 yd (200 m)
EF1	This tornado likely began as a waterspout over the Toledo Bend Reservoir, where it eventually made landfall ripping sheet metal roof panels from several boat docks. A floating boat house was flipped with a boat still inside. A porch awning was damaged and a couple of manufactured homes had their roofs damaged. Numerous large tree limbs were damaged. Some more trees and roof damage occurred before the tornado lifted.						
EF1	NNE of Quitman to SSE of Grambling	Jackson	LA	32.4287°N 92.6943°W	01:59–02:01	1.29 mi (2.08 km)	100 yd (91 m)
EF1	A brief tornado caused minor damage to mobile homes, including shifting one several feet off its foundation. Other poorly anchored buildings in the area were destroyed or tossed.						
EF1	N of Pitkin	Vernon	LA	31.015°N 92.9476°W	02:30–02:38	3.72 mi (5.99 km)	100 yd (91 m)
EF1	Several trees were uprooted. The entire track was unable to be surveyed due to the location in Fort Johnson.						
EF1	NNW of Hineston to SW of Gardner	Rapides	LA	31.2013°N 92.7725°W	02:32–02:36	1.93 mi (3.11 km)	150 yd (140 m)
EF1	A frame home was damaged, an outbuilding was destroyed, and numerous trees and power lines were damaged.						
EF1	NW of Gardner	Rapides	LA	31.278°N 92.728°W	02:41–02:48	1.38 mi (2.22 km)	100 yd (91 m)
EF1	This low-end EF1 tornado initially snapped several trees and tore a metal roof off a shed. The tornado continued north-northeast, destroying a metal outbuilding and tossing it 100 yd (91 m) downstream and a nearby table was tossed 300 yd (270 m) northwest of where it originally was. A frame home was also minorly damaged along with some trees before the tornado lifted.						

=== December 27 event ===
List of confirmed tornadoes – Friday, December 27, 2024
EF#	Location	County / Parish	State	Start Coord.	Time (UTC)	Path length	Max width
EF0	Maxie	Forrest	MS	30.97°N 89.2°W	13:36–13:37	0.6 mi (0.97 km)	60 yd (55 m)
EF0	A weak but high-end EF0 tornado damaged few trees and a downed a power line in the northern section of the De Soto National Forest.						
EF0	NW of Pearl River to WSW of Picayune	St. Tammany	LA	30.4633°N 89.8296°W	13:45–13:52	1.82 mi (2.93 km)	50 yd (46 m)
EF0	This weak tornado did minor damage to a roof of a home and caused minor damage to trees, snapping one of them. The tornado may have started further southwest than currently indicated, but the area was inaccessible to surveyors.						
EFU	NW of Wade	Jackson	MS	30.68°N 88.64°W	18:21–18:32	3.02 mi (4.86 km)	
EFU	A weak tornado was discovered via high-resolution satellite imagery. Weak tree debranching and defoliation occurred.						
EF1	N of Grand Bay to W of Tillmans Corner	Mobile	AL	30.5283°N 88.3504°W	20:04–20:18	5.27 mi (8.48 km)	100 yd (91 m)
EF1	A tornado began in a forested area, snapping pine trees and bringing down power lines. It weakened slightly as it moved northeast, continuing to snap large tree limbs, toss metal roofing, and uproot trees. The tornado caused minor roof damage and broken tree limbs in a neighborhood where sheds were flipped and debris, including metal, damaged property before dissipating in open fields.						
EF1	E of Laurel to NW of Waynesboro	Jones, Wayne	MS	31.6573°N 88.943°W	21:03–21:22	12.33 mi (19.84 km)	330 yd (300 m)
EF1	This high-end EF1 tornado initially caused sporadic tree damage before intensifying near a farm. At the farm, metal buildings were heavily damaged and some cattle were tossed. Large trees were snapped or uprooted as the tornado continued northeast, crossing US 84 and lifting the roofs off of two houses. The tornado then moved through heavily forested areas, leaving a convergent pattern of tree damage and sporadic destruction further northeast before dissipating.						
EF0	NW of Ten Mile	Stone	MS	30.778°N 89.172°W	22:10–22:13	1.12 mi (1.80 km)	200 yd (180 m)
EF0	A high-end EF0 tornado damaged several homes shingles and vinyl siding. Several trees were also snapped or uprooted to the west of the Mississippi Gulf Coast Community College, where the tornado lifted.						
EF0	Western Mobile (1st tornado)	Mobile	AL	30.679°N 88.267°W	02:20–02:23	1.65 mi (2.66 km)	80 yd (73 m)
EF0	This tornado touched down just west of the Mobile Regional Airport and moved east across its southern portion. Palm fronds were stripped and thrown downwind, and a large oak branch was snapped near the airport’s long-term parking area. Entry and exit gates to the parking lot were broken and displaced, and a light pole was knocked over near the USPS facility. Numerous tree limbs were scattered along the path. A nearby weather station recorded a peak wind gust of 55 mph (89 km/h). The tornado ended near the eastern edge of the airport.						
EF0	Western Mobile (2nd tornado)	Mobile	AL	30.696°N 88.181°W	02:32–02:34	0.18 mi (0.29 km)	30 yd (27 m)
EF0	A very brief tornado touched down on the University of South Alabama campus. It overturned portable restrooms and metal barricades, all blown to the west or northwest, indicating tornadic winds. A softwood tree was uprooted with a fall direction to the north. A tornado debris signature on radar confirmed the damage was tornadic in nature.						

=== December 28 event ===
List of confirmed tornadoes – Saturday, December 28, 2024
EF#	Location	County / Parish	State	Start Coord.	Time (UTC)	Path length	Max width
EF1	N of Oretta	Beauregard	LA	30.5622°N 93.4394°W	14:22–14:28	1.54 mi (2.48 km)	100 yd (91 m)
EF1	A tornado snapped trees.						
EF1	NE of Brookshire to N of Katy	Waller, Harris	TX	29.8176°N 95.9242°W	16:30–16:55	10.91 mi (17.56 km)	150 yd (140 m)
EF1	Several homes were damaged.						
EF3	Porter Heights to WNW of Splendora	Montgomery	TX	30.1505°N 95.3288°W	18:05–18:30	10.34 mi (16.64 km)	1,675 yd (1,532 m)
EF3	This large, intense tornado reached EF3 intensity almost immediately after touching down and destroyed two homes with roofs removed and most of their exterior walls knocked down. Some people were trapped in one of the homes but walked away uninjured. Several homes and mobile homes were heavily damaged or destroyed along the rest of the path and many trees were snapped or uprooted as well. One person was injured.						
EF2	WNW of Liverpool to southern Hillcrest	Brazoria	TX	29.33°N 95.3373°W	18:53–19:12	8.78 mi (14.13 km)	300 yd (270 m)
EF2	1 death – This tornado initially heavily damaged or destroyed outbuildings, mobile homes, and warehouses with a fatality occurring in a mobile home that was obliterated. Homes suffered roof damage, a small plane was thrown, a vehicle was flipped into a home, trees were snapped or uprooted, and power poles were damaged. After crossing SH 35 and FM 2403, the tornado strengthened to its peak intensity as it passed south of Hillcrest and struck an elementary school at EF2 strength. The school was severely damaged with most of its roof being torn off and multiple exterior walls being damaged or knocked down. The tornado then severely damaged another home and an outbuilding before dissipating. Four people were injured.						
EF1	Eastern Dickinson to Western San Leon	Galveston	TX	29.45°N 95.06°W	19:37–19:54	7.40 mi (11.91 km)	850 yd (780 m)
EF1	This tornado passed just southeast of Dickinson, causing mainly minor damage to homes and mobile homes, uprooting trees, snapping tree branches. A small area of EF1 damage occurred on the eastern side of town where homes had severe roof damage and fences were blown over. The tornado then passed west of San Leon, inflicting minor roof damage to homes, blowing over power poles, and destroying a small trailer before moving out over the Galveston Bay.						
EF3	S of Oak Island, TX to S of Port Arthur, TX to eastern Sabine National Wildlife Refuge	Chambers (TX), Jefferson (TX), Cameron (LA)	TX, LA	29.609°N 94.6904°W	20:35–22:33	68.42 mi (110.11 km)	880 yd (800 m)
EF3	This tornado touched down on the east coast of the Galveston Bay and tracked through rural Chambers County, snapping wooden power lines and destroying a mobile home. Two steel transmission lines were blown down and a pickup truck was tossed, injuring the driver. The tornado entered Jefferson County and tracked through the northern portions of McFaddin National Wildlife Refuge, where high-end EF3 damage was inflicted to two large single-story buildings that were almost completely destroyed. Other buildings nearby had their roofs removed and demolished. One car containing 2 individuals was flipped, injuring one of the two occupants. The tornado then passed just south of Port Arthur, entering Sabine Lake as a large waterspout before crossing into Louisiana. After moving back onto land, the tornado entered the eastern portions of Sabine National Wildlife Refuge before dissipating after almost two hours on the ground. Two people were injured.						
EF1	NE of Gloster	Amite	MS	31.245°N 90.9605°W	20:56–20:57	0.36 mi (0.58 km)	50 yd (46 m)
EF1	Several pine trees were downed. This tornado likely had a longer path but was inaccessible to survey.						
EF3	S of Bude to SE of McCall Creek to S of Midway	Franklin, Lincoln	MS	31.3773°N 90.8606°W	21:13–21:57	28.29 mi (45.53 km)	1,500 yd (1,400 m)
EF3	This large, intense tornado touched down south of Bude, within the northeastern sections of Homochitto National Forest and moved northeastward, snapping trees. Southeast of the town, the tornado reached low-end EF3 intensity, completely destroying the O'Zion Baptist Church, inflicting severe damage to some homes, and causing widespread tree damage in the area. A mobile home in the area was also rolled on its side, injuring the two occupants. The tornado then continued northeastward, rolling another mobile home and snapping additional trees and a power pole. It then passed just barely southeast of McCall Creek, blowing the roof off of a modular home, damaging or destroying outbuildings, and snapping or uprooting trees. The tornado then crossed US 84 just west of Lucien, and continued northeastward, snapping or uprooting more trees, rolling a small mobile home, and inflicting severe roof damage to another home. Just before crossing into Lincoln County, the tornado reached low-end EF3 intensity again and blew down multiple large transmission towers. After crossing the county line, the tornado caused additional damage to the roofs of homes as well as to power lines and trees before dissipating.						
EF1	SW of New Llano to NNE of Rosepine	Vernon	LA	31.0332°N 93.3392°W	21:20–21:28	6.55 mi (10.54 km)	100 yd (91 m)
EF1	Numerous trees were damaged.						
EF0	S of Leander	Vernon	LA	31.0643°N 92.8474°W	21:25–21:26	0.32 mi (0.51 km)	50 yd (46 m)
EF0	A very brief tornado downed several trees.						
EF0	SSE of New Llano	Vernon	LA	31.0819°N 93.2693°W	21:27–21:32	3.31 mi (5.33 km)	50 yd (46 m)
EF0	This tornado touched down just east of US 171, pulling the roof and metal panels off of an outbuilding. Southeast of the outbuilding, the tornado caused minor roof damage to the shingles of two homes. The tornado snapped pine trees as it moved into western Fort Johnson before dissipating.						
EF1	N of Fullerton	Vernon	LA	31.0204°N 92.9878°W	21:49–21:51	1.2 mi (1.9 km)	50 yd (46 m)
EF1	Several trees were snapped on the southern edge of Fort Johnson.						
EF1	ENE of Delhi to W of Transylvania	Madison, East Carroll	LA	32.4768°N 91.4357°W	22:15–22:38	16.2 mi (26.1 km)	280 yd (260 m)
EF1	A tornado damaged the roof of a house, peeled the roof off an outbuilding and snapped several trees before moving over open fields. As it tracked through the fields, a few trees were downed, large tree limbs were snapped and minor damage occurred to outbuildings. The tornado then began damage to the exterior of homes, including pushing a mobile home off its foundation before lifting.						
EF1	E of Warden to ENE of Epps	Richland, West Carroll	LA	32.5357°N 91.4892°W	22:19–22:26	5.7 mi (9.2 km)	130 yd (120 m)
EF1	This tornado touched down at a golf club north of Poverty Point Reservoir State Park, downing large tree limbs, partially blowing out a garage wall, and displacing outdoor furniture.						
EF1	ESE of Delhi	Madison	LA	32.4207°N 91.4017°W	22:25–22:28	1.9 mi (3.1 km)	200 yd (180 m)
EF1	A tornado crossed I-20 and US 80, snapping and uprooting trees.						
EF1	S of Transylvania, LA to NNE of Fitler, MS	East Carroll (LA), Issaquena (MS)	LA, MS	32.6157°N 91.1955°W	22:49–23:10	15.4 mi (24.8 km)	300 yd (270 m)
EF1	A low-end EF1 tornado downed large hardwood limbs, which blocked railroad tracks along US 65. One house sustained significant shingle loss, but structural damage was minimal. The tornado then crossed the Mississippi River into Mississippi, where it destroyed a shed, damaged a carport, and shifted a mobile home off its foundation. The tornado continued to break branches and snap small trees before dissipating.						
EF1	E of Bayou Chicot to NW of Lebeau	Evangeline, St. Landry	LA	30.846°N 92.2572°W	23:06–23:18	15.6 mi (25.1 km)	200 yd (180 m)
EF1	This tornado started in the small community of St. Landry, damaging and snapping some trees. The tornado moved southeast, damaging some power lines near St. Louis. The tornado continued damaging trees before dissipating and crossing US 71.						
EF1	ESE of Ridgecrest	Concordia	LA	31.593°N 91.5123°W	23:12–23:13	0.4 mi (0.64 km)	80 yd (73 m)
EF1	A brief tornado uprooted some trees, broke a fence, snapped large branches, and shifted a shed off its foundation.						
EFU	N of Creole	Cameron	LA	29.9128°N 93.1592°W	23:17–23:28	4.33 mi (6.97 km)	330 yd (300 m)
EFU	A tornado was confirmed via satellite and radar. It caused damage to vegetation, which is not a damage indicator that could be rated.						
EF1	NW of East Lincoln	Lincoln	MS	31.519°N 90.2802°W	23:33–23:50	9.9 mi (15.9 km)	400 yd (370 m)
EF1	A high-end EF1 snapped and uprooted numerous trees throughout its path. A home had its roof and a nearby shed minorly damaged from the tornado as well.						
EF1	NW of Fayette	Jefferson	MS	31.7151°N 91.1949°W	23:37–23:46	8.9 mi (14.3 km)	750 yd (690 m)
EF1	Numerous trees were uprooted or snapped. One tree fell on a power line and several houses had shingle damage.						
EF0	SW of Innis to NNW of Batchelor	Pointe Coupee	LA	30.85°N 91.7°W	23:40–23:44	2.02 mi (3.25 km)	50 yd (46 m)
EF0	Scattered tree damage occurred.						
EF1	ENE of Fort Adams to E of Woodville	Wilkinson	MS	31.14°N 91.42°W	23:42–23:58	11.32 mi (18.22 km)	50 yd (46 m)
EF1	Several hundred trees were damaged.						
EF0	S of Doloroso to SW of Wilkinson	Wilkinson	MS	31.21°N 91.37°W	23:46–23:50	4.65 mi (7.48 km)	25 yd (23 m)
EF0	A high-end EF0 tornado snapped branches and downed a tree. Most of tornado's path was inaccessible to ground surveyors and was extended through the use of high-resolution satellite imagery.						
EF1	N of Pattison	Claiborne	MS	31.88°N 90.97°W	23:54–00:01	5 mi (8.0 km)	300 yd (270 m)
EF1	A manufactured home and a tin carport were shifted, and the home sustained roof damage as well. Many trees were snapped or uprooted.						
EF1	E of Red Lick to WNW of Payton	Jefferson, Claiborne	MS	31.79°N 90.97°W	23:55–00:03	9.2 mi (14.8 km)	400 yd (370 m)
EF1	A portion of a manufactured home's roof was peeled off, and some tin was peeled from another residence as well. Numerous trees were snapped or uprooted.						
EF1	E of Yokena to NW of Cayuga	Warren	MS	32.1623°N 90.8792°W	23:58–00:07	4.6 mi (7.4 km)	500 yd (460 m)
EF1	Numerous trees were snapped and uprooted.						
EF0	NW of Centreville to WSW of Gloster	Wilkinson	MS	31.18°N 91.16°W	00:00–00:06	3.96 mi (6.37 km)	75 yd (69 m)
EF0	An intermittent tornado damaged tree branches and treetops as it moved eastward through densely forested areas. Part of tornado's path was inaccessible to ground surveyors and was extended through the use of high-resolution satellite imagery.						
EF1	ENE of Oldenburg to WNW of Brookhaven	Franklin, Lincoln	MS	31.61°N 90.93°W	00:03–00:27	20.1 mi (32.3 km)	1,055 yd (965 m)
EF1	Numerous trees were snapped or uprooted across a long, wide path. Power poles were snapped as well. This tornado likely crossed the track of the previous EF3 tornado.						
EF0	NNW of Cayuga to SSW of Edwards	Warren, Hinds	MS	32.2378°N 90.7363°W	00:09–00:13	4.2 mi (6.8 km)	250 yd (230 m)
EF0	Several large tree branches were broken and some trees were uprooted. This tornado may have been part of the 2358 UTC tornado.						
EF1	SSW of Edwards to NW of Bolton	Hinds	MS	32.3111°N 90.6164°W	00:18–00:28	9.5 mi (15.3 km)	350 yd (320 m)
EF1	Numerous large tree branches were broken and several trees were snapped and uprooted north and south I-20.						
EF1	W of Pinola	Simpson	MS	31.8343°N 90.0272°W	00:24–00:32	4.33 mi (6.97 km)	350 yd (320 m)
EF1	Trees were snapped and uprooted.						
EF1	NE of Lynchburg to Vernon to S of Scotland	Hinds, Madison	MS	32.4766°N 90.5248°W	00:25–00:48	22.1 mi (35.6 km)	570 yd (520 m)
EF1	This long-track tornado began by snapping and uprooting trees before intensifying and causing extensive tree and a nearby barn also sustained roof damage. It continued northeast, crossing US 49 and causing sporadic home and tree damage in Vernon and Kearney Park before reintensifying and uprooting hardwood trees. The tornado dissipated shortly after exiting the two communities.						
EF1	NE of Satartia	Yazoo	MS	32.7028°N 90.4876°W	00:28–00:30	1.2 mi (1.9 km)	250 yd (230 m)
EF1	Some small branches were broken and a few trees were snapped and uprooted.						
EF1	NW of Brookhaven	Lincoln	MS	31.636°N 90.5517°W	00:33–00:36	3.04 mi (4.89 km)	300 yd (270 m)
EF1	This low-end EF1 tornado uprooted several trees.						
EF1	W of Crystal Springs to ESE of Terry	Copiah, Hinds	MS	31.9915°N 90.4475°W	00:36–00:51	13.06 mi (21.02 km)	1,500 yd (1,400 m)
EF1	This large tornado snapped and uprooted numerous trees, one of which fell onto and damaged a home.						
EF1	Marinsville	Copiah	MS	31.7728°N 90.438°W	00:38–00:43	2.74 mi (4.41 km)	500 yd (460 m)
EF1	This tornado touched down west of I-55 and caused minor tree damage before crossing the interstate into Martinsville. In town, several trees were uprooted with others receiving minor damage before the tornado dissipated.						
EF1	NNW of Gillsburg	Amite	MS	31.0588°N 90.6637°W	00:41–00:42	0.28 mi (0.45 km)	25 yd (23 m)
EF1	A few trees were snapped. This tornado likely had a longer path but was inaccessible to survey.						
EF1	N of Gillsburg to NW of Chatawa	Amite, Pike	MS	31.13°N 90.65°W	00:42–00:53	7.4 mi (11.9 km)	100 yd (91 m)
EF1	This tornado initially caused sporadic swaths of tree damage as it tracked east-southeast. Scattered to widespread tree damage was visible on high-resolution satellite for most of the tornado's path. Drone photos helped to identify a swath of numerous snapped pines which was used to rate the tornado despite the majority of the path being inaccessible and analyzed via high-resolution satellite imagery.						
EF1	SW of Chatawa	Amite, Pike	MS	31.03°N 90.57°W	00:48–00:53	3.77 mi (6.07 km)	—N/a
EF1	Trees were snapped and uprooted.						
EF1	ENE of Sardis to Georgetown to WNW of Union	Copiah, Simpson	MS	31.813°N 90.3093°W	00:49–01:02	12 mi (19 km)	1,232 yd (1,127 m)
EF1	This large tornado touched down just outside of Sardis and moved northeastward, inflicting minor damage to a home and snapping or uprooting dozens of trees. The tornado then moved through Georgetown, snapping or uprooting trees and inflicting minor roof damage to many homes in the town. The tornado then crossed the Pearl River into Simpson County before dissipating shortly afterward.						
EF0	Monticello	East Baton Rogue	LA	30.52°N 91.07°W	00:51–00:55	2.16 mi (3.48 km)	50 yd (46 m)
EF0	This brief, high-end EF0 tornado uprooted trees in residentials areas, causing scattered damage to homes which the trees fell on.						
EF1	E of Bogue Chitto	Lincoln	MS	31.4379°N 90.3669°W	00:53–00:59	2.6 mi (4.2 km)	400 yd (370 m)
EF1	Trees were snapped, one of which caused damage to a shed upon falling.						
EF1	NE of Scotland to SE of Vaughan	Yazoo	MS	32.7362°N 90.1667°W	00:55–01:04	7.4 mi (11.9 km)	800 yd (730 m)
EF1	The tornado began by breaking large branches before intensifying near MS 16, where it uprooted trees, rolled a shed, and damaged a roof. It continued causing extensive tree damage, snapping pines and uprooting hardwoods, while also damaging a carport, shed, and mobile home skirting. The tornado tracked toward I-55, with its path beyond that point remaining uncertain due to inaccessibility. Further surveying is expected.						
EF1	Flowood to Lena to SW of Tuscola	Rankin, Scott, Leake	MS	32.3182°N 90.1046°W	01:04–01:44	38.3 mi (61.6 km)	880 yd (800 m)
EF1	This large, long-tracked QLCS tornado began in a park in Flowood, causing damage to large tree limbs and small trees. The tornado tracked northeast downing dead pine trees just north of Jackson–Medgar Wiley Evers International Airport before entering the Dogwood Festival shopping area, causing minor damage to businesses and downing small trees before strengthening as it moved northeast. Many homes sustained substantial structural damage from fallen trees and large limbs while roofs and sidings suffered lighter impacts. The tornado caused significant damage in neighborhoods near the southern edge of the Ross Barnett Reservoir, downed utility poles at Pelahatchie Creek along MS 25, and removed shingles from homes further east. The tornado damaged sheds, outbuildings, and chicken houses south of Ludlow and caused major damage to a manufactured home along MS 483. The tornado continued into the northern edge of the Bienville National Forest before entering Lena. In Lena, a small antenna at the town's fire department was collapsed and a shed was partially destroyed in town. A few large branches were snapped off of trees east of Lena before the tornado lifted.						
EF1	ESE of New Hebron	Jefferson Davis	MS	31.7213°N 89.9558°W	01:15–01:16	0.2 mi (0.32 km)	200 yd (180 m)
EF1	A brief tornado snapped and uprooted trees in a concentrated area.						
EF1	SW of D'Lo to Mendenhall to NNE of Weathersby	Simpson	MS	31.9382°N 89.9617°W	01:15–01:26	10.7 mi (17.2 km)	800 yd (730 m)
EF1	A tornado began west of Mendenhall, snapping trees and damaging multiple chicken houses before reaching the city. As the tornado entered town, numerous trees and power lines were downed, some falling on homes, while power poles were snapped. A shed was pushed over, roofs were peeled from buildings, and a church's brick façade was blown down. East of the city, the tornado crossed US 49 and continued causing tree and structural damage before lifting.						
EF1	NNE of Mount Olive to SSW of Mize	Smith	MS	31.7929°N 89.6277°W	01:39–01:43	3.4 mi (5.5 km)	200 yd (180 m)
EF1	Large portions of the roof of two chicken houses were removed and numerous trees were snapped and uprooted.						
EF0	NW of Raleigh	Smith	MS	32.0733°N 89.5857°W	01:44–01:45	0.56 mi (0.90 km)	75 yd (69 m)
EF0	A short-lived high-end EF0 tornado downed a few pine trees.						
EF1	W of Shongelo to WNW of Montrose	Smith	MS	32.1046°N 89.5739°W	01:46–01:59	13.18 mi (21.21 km)	700 yd (640 m)
EF1	This tornado tracked through the southern portions of the Bienville National Forest, downing numerous pine trees. Portions of a chicken house were damaged with tin panels strewn along a county road and another shed was mostly destroyed with large branches downed nearby.						
EF0	SSE of Bay Springs	Jasper	MS	31.9274°N 89.2551°W	02:08–02:09	0.99 mi (1.59 km)	50 yd (46 m)
EF0	A high-end EF0 tornado left a narrow corridor of convergently downed pine trees.						
EF0	SSW of Lawrence	Newton	MS	32.2473°N 89.2553°W	02:09–02:10	0.65 mi (1.05 km)	50 yd (46 m)
EF0	A weak tornado occurred in the eastern edge of the Bienville National Forest, damaging a barn and minorly damaging trees.						
EF2	Lake Como to W of Paulding	Jasper	MS	31.9609°N 89.2135°W	02:12–02:22	9.27 mi (14.92 km)	900 yd (820 m)
EF2	This large tornado destroyed multiple chicken houses along a county road with parts of the houses being tossed up to a quarter mile away. Vegetation was damaged, pine trees were snapped, a tree fell onto a mobile home, and a nearby carport was thrown a few dozen yards from its original location. Homes also sustained damage to their roof flashing and gutters along the tornado's path and a shed was damaged near Lake Como as well.						
EF1	SSE of Newton to WSW of Hickory	Newton	MS	32.264°N 89.1469°W	02:19–02:25	4.61 mi (7.42 km)	700 yd (640 m)
EF1	Many trees were uprooted or snapped and several barns and farm outbuildings were damaged.						
EF0	Western Hickory	Newton	MS	32.3164°N 89.0336°W	02:27–02:29	0.49 mi (0.79 km)	165 yd (151 m)
EF0	A few buildings were damaged and minor tree damage occurred.						
EF1	NW of Chunky	Newton	MS	32.3366°N 88.97°W	02:34–02:38	2.58 mi (4.15 km)	650 yd (590 m)
EF1	A home lost its roof, a shed was damaged, and numerous trees were uprooted or damaged.						
EF1	NW of Pachuta to ENE of Enterprise	Jasper, Clarke	MS	32.0931°N 89.9187°W	02:36–02:49	12 mi (19 km)	500 yd (460 m)
EF1	This low-end EF1 touched down in the small community of Orange, uplifting the tin roof of a shed and causing minor damage to trees. The tornado caused minor tree damage as it moved northeast crossing I-59. Just south of Enterprise, the tornado uprooted large trees and snapped large branches before lifting just east of the town.						
EF1	Eastern Lacombe	St. Tammany	LA	30.3°N 89.8976°W	02:47–02:51	1.15 mi (1.85 km)	50 yd (46 m)
EF1	This low-end EF1 tornado immediately snapped trees and caused significant damage to a mobile home as soon as it touched down. The mobile home suffered partial roof failure, broken windows, and was shifted off its foundation. Debris from the roof of the mobile home was thrown over 100 yd (91 m). The tornado continued eastward, snapping some more trees in yards and wooded areas before dissipating.						
EF1	E of Clayton Village	Oktibbeha	MS	33.4638°N 88.7488°W	02:49–02:51	2.1 mi (3.4 km)	300 yd (270 m)
EF1	A high-end EF1 tornado touched down in a neighborhood just outside of Starkville, damaging the roofs of several townhomes. Tree damage was also noted by the townhomes. Further along the tornado's path, it snapped power poles and trees and damaged several more roofs. The tornado dissipated after crossing US 82.						
EF1	N of Quitman	Clarke	MS	32.0402°N 88.7347°W	02:53–02:55	2.4 mi (3.9 km)	400 yd (370 m)
EF1	Numerous trees and a power pole were snapped. One tree fell onto a home. A garage door was blown in. A shed was destroyed.						
EF1	ENE of Enterprise	Clarke	MS	32.2086°N 88.6954°W	02:55	0.4 mi (0.64 km)	80 yd (73 m)
EF1	Several trees were uprooted and minor damage to siding and shingles occurred.						
EF0	E of Tibbee to WNW of Waverly	Clay	MS	33.5221°N 88.5789°W	02:59–03:03	4.7 mi (7.6 km)	200 yd (180 m)
EF0	A high-end EF0 tornado began just north of the Lowndes-Clay County line, snapping several trees. The tornado tracked northeast, damaging the roof of a mobile home and a porch, uprooting trees, and blowing down a fence. Tree damage continued to occur until the tornado dissipated.						
EF1	SE of Meridian Station	Lauderdale	MS	32.4902°N 88.6365°W	03:01–03:11	9.21 mi (14.82 km)	630 yd (580 m)
EF1	A tornado moved through the Meridian Naval Air Station, damaging several buildings, one of which suffered extensive roof damage, partial collapse of the brick veneer, broken windows, and subsequent interior water damage. The fire station doors were blown in and some vehicles were damaged. Some trees were uprooted and snapped in and around the air station.						
EF1	SW of Increase to S of Alamucha	Lauderdale	MS	32.2418°N 88.6134°W	03:01–03:14	10.3 mi (16.6 km)	700 yd (640 m)
EF1	Several trees were uprooted and multiple large branches were snapped.						
EF1	NE of Quitman	Clarke	MS	32.0914°N 88.6174°W	03:03–03:12	8.8 mi (14.2 km)	450 yd (410 m)
EF1	Numerous trees were snapped or uprooted; one fell onto a home. A shed sustained roof damage.						
EF1	W of Vernon	Lamar	AL	33.71°N 88.21°W	03:27–03:32	5.07 mi (8.16 km)	300 yd (270 m)
EF1	A home lost its roof and dozens of trees were snapped and uprooted.						
EF2	SE of Winchester	Wayne	MS	31.5803°N 88.5904°W	03:33–03:39	4.38 mi (7.05 km)	500 yd (460 m)
EF2	This low-end EF2 tornado touched down and damaged several greenhouses at a nursery and snapped or uprooted trees nearby. The tornado intensified as it moved east-northeast, completely rolling a manufactured home off its foundation, injuring four people, and inflicting significant tree and roof damage in the same area. Numerous large trees were snapped, and several vehicles were destroyed by falling debris. The tornado continued across US 45, damaging a church and several long chicken houses, with roofs peeled off and one of the chicken houses partially destroyed. Additional tree and roof damage occurred along rural roads before the tornado dissipated in an inaccessible forested area near Buckatunna Creek. Future adjustments to the track may refine its extent due to limited access for surveys.						
EF0	NW of Sulligent	Lamar	AL	33.9441°N 88.2174°W	03:40–03:41	1.45 mi (2.33 km)	100 yd (91 m)
EF0	Tree limbs were downed and several trees were snapped and uprooted.						
EF0	N of Beaverton	Lamar	AL	33.9421°N 88.0175°W	03:45–03:47	1.63 mi (2.62 km)	150 yd (140 m)
EF0	A house had its shingles damaged and a cluster of trees were snapped and uprooted.						
EF0	NE of Brilliant	Marion	AL	34.0598°N 87.7171°W	04:05–04:07	2.09 mi (3.36 km)	150 yd (140 m)
EF0	This tornado initially snapped a power pole and removed the roof covering off of a manufactured home. Moving northeastward, a few trees were uprooted, another home sustained shingle loss, and a trampoline was tossed into the woods. The tornado then produced significant tree damage for a short period before lifting.						
EF1	NE of Forkland to Sawyerville to SSW of Havana	Greene, Hale	AL	32.6733°N 87.819°W	04:13–04:32	14.77 mi (23.77 km)	1,760 yd (1,610 m)
EF1	This very large tornado began northeast of Forkland, uprooting large hardwood trees that damaged a home and vehicle, while also tearing metal panels from a farm outbuilding. A well-defined area of significant tree damage followed, with dozens to hundreds of pine trees snapped, suggesting multiple vortices. As the tornado widened to nearly a mile, it destroyed a hay barn, damaged homes, and snapped trees. The tornado then turned northward through Sawyerville, causing only minor damage before intensifying again with sporadic tree damage along its path before eventually dissipating north-northeast of town. No tornado warning was ever issued for this tornado.						
EF1	NW of Foshee	Escambia	AL	31.1936°N 87.3245°W	04:13–04:15	2.36 mi (3.80 km)	50 yd (46 m)
EF1	This tornado touched down just north of I-65, leaning several trees and snapping some small tree branches. The tornado continued damaging trees, snapping and uprooting them. The tornado began to occlude, where it impacted some small cabins, snapped multiple trees, and destroyed most of a tree stand.						
EF1	SW of Range	Conecuh	AL	31.28°N 87.27°W	04:22–04:25	1.38 mi (2.22 km)	120 yd (110 m)
EF1	A tornado remained completely within forests, uprooting trees and breaking tree branches.						
EF0	N of Range to ENE of Repton	Conecuh	AL	31.3463°N 87.2387°W	04:30–04:40	5.19 mi (8.35 km)	30 yd (27 m)
EF0	A high-end EF0 tornado damaged several trees.						
EF1	Burnt Corn	Monroe, Conecuh	AL	31.5239°N 87.1659°W	04:55–05:01	2.84 mi (4.57 km)	150 yd (140 m)
EF1	A few trees were uprooted and a Baptist church was shifted slightly off its foundation.						
EF1	NE of Loree to W of Lyeffion	Conecuh	AL	31.5°N 87.05°W	05:04–05:18	7.31 mi (11.76 km)	700 yd (640 m)
EF1	A trailer was tossed, three log cabins had their metal roofs peeled back, a chapel was shifted off its foundation, and hundreds of trees were snapped or uprooted.						
EF1	Athens	Limestone	AL	34.7753°N 86.9782°W	05:15–05:20	3.87 mi (6.23 km)	160 yd (150 m)
EF1	This damaging EF1 tornado began in southern Athens, snapping tree branches and uprooting several trees as it moved northward. The tornado caused its first significant building damage at a restaurant near US 72, where part of the roof was blown off and debris scattered across the area. It strengthened as it entered downtown Athens, snapping power poles and uprooting trees, with the most notable damage occurring around the square near the Limestone County courthouse. Multiple buildings in the area lost portions of their roofs, including a bookstore whose roof was completely torn off, and debris was scattered blocks away. A historic oak tree by the courthouse was uprooted and major damage occurred at Veterans Memorial Park where fencing was downed and a helicopter display was hurled approximately 60 ft (18 m). The tornado then reached peak intensity as it impacted an old warehouse, completely destroying it due to poor structural anchoring. Additional roof damage was noted along CSX's S&NA North Subdivision as the tornado exited downtown, with sporadic tree damage observed until it dissipated. No tornado warning was issued for this tornado.						
EF1	W of Providence	Butler	AL	31.69°N 86.89°W	05:29–05:38	4.98 mi (8.01 km)	800 yd (730 m)
EF1	A high-end EF1 tornado snapped and uprooted numerous trees throughout its path.						
EF0	E of Thorsby to SE of Jumbo	Chilton	AL	32.9193°N 86.6622°W	05:57–06:05	6.01 mi (9.67 km)	150 yd (140 m)
EF0	This weak tornado tore a few metal roof panels off of a barndominium and did minor damage to trees.						
EF0	S of Belle Fontaine	Mobile	AL	30.4315°N 88.107°W	05:59–06:00	0.16 mi (0.26 km)	30 yd (27 m)
EF0	This tornado pulled a home's back patio wall down, tossing it and the contents of the patio south of the home. Large tree limbs were knocked down, outdoor furniture was thrown, and minor cosmetic damage occurred to piers. A fence was blown over before the tornado moved offshore into Mobile Bay.						

=== December 29 event ===
List of confirmed tornadoes – Sunday, December 29, 2024
EF#	Location	County / Parish	State	Start Coord.	Time (UTC)	Path length	Max width
EF1	NW of Harpersville	Shelby	AL	33.3551°N 86.4716°W	06:11–06:14	1.53 mi (2.46 km)	175 yd (160 m)
EF1	A horse farm had four buildings on its property damaged and several trees were uprooted, some of which had their large branches snapped.						
EF0	SE of Mount Willing	Lowndes	AL	32.0121°N 86.6604°W	06:15–06:18	1.71 mi (2.75 km)	100 yd (91 m)
EF0	This high-end EF0 tornado damaged a few structures, including rolling a mobile home onto its roof and another with minor roof damage. A large shed lost roof panels and some power lines were downed. Numerous trees were also downed with limbs broken and uprooted trunks along with smaller trees that were snapped.						
EF0	ESE of New London	St. Clair	AL	33.4609°N 86.3355°W	06:25–06:28	2.26 mi (3.64 km)	150 yd (140 m)
EF0	A high-end EF0 tornado tracked along the south shore of Logan Martin Lake, snapping or uprooting numerous trees, many of which fell onto homes along the lake.						
EF1	WSW of Pell City	St. Clair	AL	33.5678°N 86.3477°W	06:30–06:33	1.52 mi (2.45 km)	325 yd (297 m)
EF1	A chicken farm had five structures damaged with debris from the farm being thrown at least 300 yd (270 m) downstream. Multiple trees were snapped or uprooted along the path as well.						
EF0	NW of Pintlala	Lowndes, Montgomery	AL	32.2233°N 86.4239°W	06:39–06:41	1.17 mi (1.88 km)	100 yd (91 m)
EF0	Several cedar trees had their limbs snapped and numerous other trees were uprooted or downed. Solar panels were blown off a house and siding was removed from a nearby outbuilding. The tornado briefly crossed into Montgomery County, removing most of a small barn's roof and flipping a wooden playground set as the tornado lifted.						
EF1	Northeastern Hope Hull	Montgomery	AL	32.2615°N 86.3715°W	06:43–06:48	3.94 mi (6.34 km)	250 yd (230 m)
EF1	This tornado began just west of I-65 and quickly crossed it, causing roof and siding damage to warehouses, flipping semi-trailers, and collapsing a cinderblock wall. The tornado scattered the debris across the interstate and damaged businesses, including Hooper Academy, near US 31 and I-65 interchange. Moving east-northeast, the tornado uprooted trees, stripped a greenhouse-style building of its covering, and caused roof damage to a house, shed, and small metal building before dissipating west of US 331.						
EF1	NNE of Summerdale	Baldwin	AL	30.5001°N 87.6923°W	06:47–06:50	2.38 mi (3.83 km)	50 yd (46 m)
EF1	A tornado initially touched down near a home and significantly damaged the roof, destroyed the home's patio, and destroyed a shed roof near the home along with downing large tree branches and fencing. At an RV park, an RV was overturned, some outdoor items were displaced, and minor tree damage occurred. At a nearby mobile home community, skirting was torn from homes and loose items like furniture and toys were scattered. The tornado intensified again further northeast, damaging a metal outbuilding by removing and twisting roofing and support beams, launching debris and overturning a small tractor. The tornado lifted shortly after damaging the outbuilding.						
EF1	NE of Ada to SW of Mathews	Montgomery	AL	32.1316°N 86.2238°W	06:53–07:05	10.01 mi (16.11 km)	500 yd (460 m)
EF1	A tornado initially caused minor tree damage with one pine tree falling on a home. Numerous other trees were snapped or uprooted and a double-wide trailer and nearby sheds also sustained damage. Tree damage continued across wooded areas and pastures before the tornado reached US 231, where a business lost part of its roof and many pine tree were snapped or uprooted. Additional tree and outbuilding damage continued until the tornado dissipated.						
EF0	N of Mathews	Montgomery	AL	32.283°N 86.0376°W	07:11–07:13	2.5 mi (4.0 km)	100 yd (91 m)
EF0	A tornado caused convergent tree damage, snapping and uprooting trees, and partially removing a garage roof. The damage continued eastward, affecting wooded areas and structures before dissipating.						
EF0	Western Shorter	Macon	AL	32.3852°N 85.9811°W	07:18–07:21	1.86 mi (2.99 km)	175 yd (160 m)
EF0	Several trees and tree limbs were downed or snapped.						
EF0	S of Shorter to ESE of Milstead	Macon	AL	32.3759°N 85.9362°W	07:18–07:27	5.55 mi (8.93 km)	200 yd (180 m)
EF0	A tornado uprooted trees and snapped limbs near homes and a church as it crossed US 80, causing its most significant damage near a school. The damage diminished further east, with smaller trees and limbs downed before the tornado dissipated.						
EF0	NW of Franklin	Macon	AL	32.4729°N 85.8696°W	07:30–07:32	2.17 mi (3.49 km)	75 yd (69 m)
EF0	Several trees were snapped and uprooted in a densely wooded area.						
EF0	NNE of Franklin	Macon	AL	32.4839°N 85.7918°W	07:31–07:32	0.76 mi (1.22 km)	50 yd (46 m)
EF0	A few small trees and tree limbs were downed.						
EF1	Durand to Harris City to ESE of Haralson	Meriwether	GA	32.9168°N 84.7633°W	08:54–09:20	24.62 mi (39.62 km)	200 yd (180 m)
EF1	A long-tracked EF1 tornado traversed most of central Meriwether County, snapping and uprooting thousands of trees throughout its path. One large tree fell on an unoccupied home, completely destroying it, and a manufactured home had its metal roofing blown off.						
EF1	NNE of Campbellton	Douglas	GA	33.6959°N 84.6465°W	09:15–09:16	0.25 mi (0.40 km)	100 yd (91 m)
EF1	This brief tornado downed several trees that fell onto and severely damaged multiple homes. A resident of one of the homes was injured.						
EF0	E of Haralson to SE of Senoia	Meriwether, Coweta	GA	33.2174°N 84.5236°W	09:22–09:26	3.2 mi (5.1 km)	100 yd (91 m)
EF0	This high-end EF0 downed hundreds of trees on both sides of the Meriwether-Coweta county line.						
EF0	E of Starr's Mill to SW of Woolsey	Fayette	GA	33.3379°N 84.4562°W	09:38–09:41	1.58 mi (2.54 km)	100 yd (91 m)
EF0	A few trees were downed and numerous large tree branches were snapped.						
EF1	SE of Noonday	Cobb	GA	34.0332°N 84.4893°W	09:40–09:41	0.26 mi (0.42 km)	
EF1	A brief tornado damaged approximately a dozen homes due to downing large trees on top of them. One home was nearly destroyed by a large pine tree, injuring two people.						
EF0	Western Dunwoody	DeKalb	GA	33.9398°N 84.3353°W	09:46–09:47	0.51 mi (0.82 km)	
EF0	This high-end EF0 tornado damaged an apartment unit, partially ripping the roof off. Approximately ten homes were damaged and roughly 50 to 100 trees and several power poles were snapped or uprooted, falling onto several homes, two of which had significant damage.						
EF0	SSE of Gowensville	Spartanburg	SC	35.0304°N 82.2151°W	12:55–12:57	1.72 mi (2.77 km)	30 yd (27 m)
EF0	Multiple trees were uprooted and large tree limbs were snapped.						
EF0	ENE of Mill Spring	Polk	NC	35.3059°N 82.1215°W	13:13–13:14	0.89 mi (1.43 km)	75 yd (69 m)
EF0	An EF0 tornado briefly touched down east of Mill Spring, uprooting dozens of trees before dissipating.						
EF0	NE of Cross Anchor	Union	SC	34.662°N 81.824°W	13:15–13:19	2.24 mi (3.60 km)	30 yd (27 m)
EF0	Several large tree limbs were snapped and trees were uprooted.						
EF0	ESE of Monarch Mills	Union	SC	34.7102°N 81.5533°W	13:27–13:36	6.99 mi (11.25 km)	50 yd (46 m)
EF0	Several large tree limbs were snapped and trees were uprooted and downed.						
EF0	WNW of Buffalo	Union	SC	34.7606°N 81.7538°W	13:28–13:31	1.74 mi (2.80 km)	25 yd (23 m)
EF0	Numerous large tree limbs were snapped and trees were uprooted and downed.						
EF0	E of Chapin to SSW of Winnsboro Mills	Richland, Fairfield	SC	34.1534°N 81.3024°W	13:35–13:49	11.2 mi (18.0 km)	150 yd (140 m)
EF0	This weak but long-lived tornado damaged several trees.						
EF0	S of Winnsboro Mills	Fairfield	SC	34.284°N 81.1391°W	13:52–13:57	3.72 mi (5.99 km)	200 yd (180 m)
EF0	Minor shingle damage occurred to homes, a few large tree limbs were snapped, and a tree was uprooted.						
EF1	SE of Winnsboro Mills	Fairfield	SC	34.3339°N 81.088°W	13:56–14:04	4.89 mi (7.87 km)	250 yd (230 m)
EF1	A tornado began just north of a manufacturing plant to the west of US 321, overturning four empty trailers and snapping multiple utility poles. The tornado crossed the highway, collapsed a large garage door on the east side of a food plant, and snapped numerous trees nearby. Several more trees and power poles were snapped as the tornado tracked east and dissipated.						
EF0	Bethany	York	SC	35.1125°N 81.3056°W	14:09–14:13	3.24 mi (5.21 km)	50 yd (46 m)
EF0	Several trees were uprooted and tree limbs were snapped.						
EF0	Belmont	Mecklenburg	NC	35.2013°N 80.9734°W	14:22–14:23	1.55 mi (2.49 km)	20 yd (18 m)
EF0	A tree was downed and several large tree limbs were snapped.						
EF0	SW of Marysville	Union	OH	40.2158°N 83.4027°W	20:08–20:09	0.35 mi (0.56 km)	50 yd (46 m)
EF0	A weak tornado toppled a small silo, damaged several trees, and caused minor damage to an older barn and a few roof shingles. Another large metal barn had its roof damaged and a partial collapse of its walls.						

== See also ==
- Tornadoes of 2024
- List of United States tornadoes from August to October 2024
- List of United States tornadoes from January to March 2025
