= Tornado outbreak of November 2–5, 2024 =

Late season United States tornado outbreak

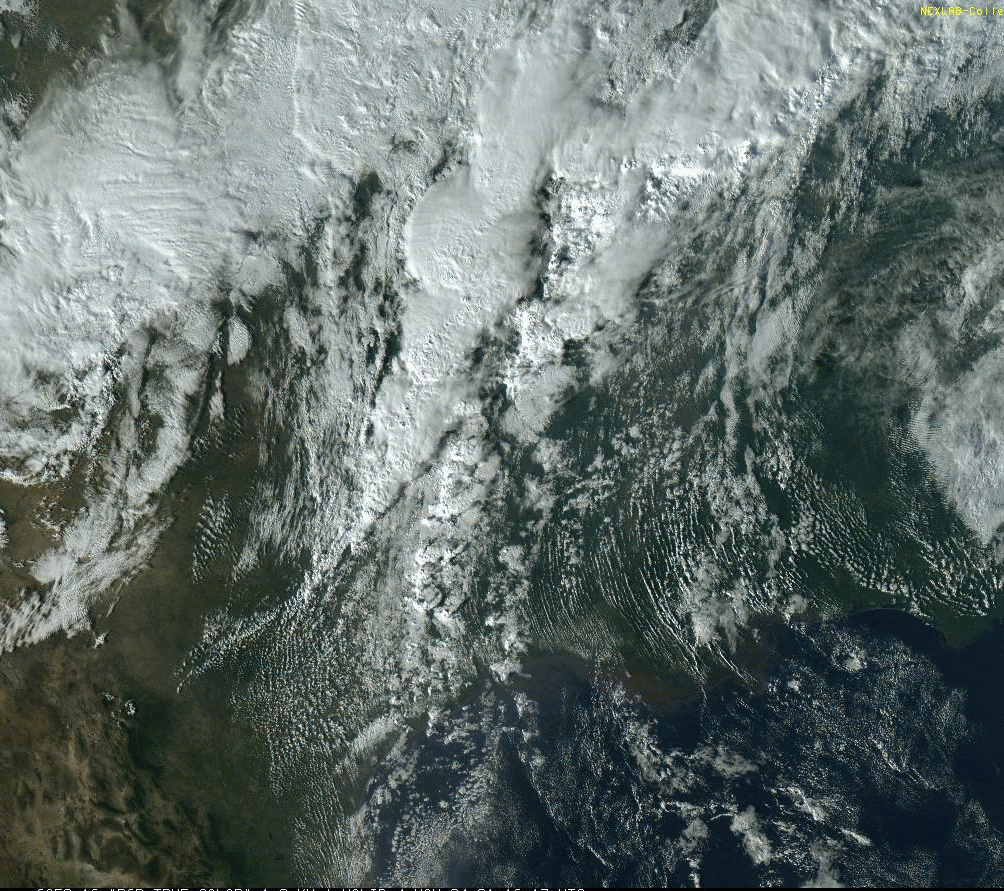
- The system responsible for the outbreak, as seen on true color satellite data on November 4

Meteorological history
- Date: November 2–5, 2024
- Duration: 4 days

Tornado outbreak
- Tornadoes: 44
- Max. rating: EF3 tornado
- Highest winds: 94 mph (151 km/h) Rogers County, Oklahoma on November 2
- Largest hail: 2.5 in (6.4 cm) Sanderson, Texas on November 2

Overall effects
- Fatalities: 6 All non-tornadic
- Injuries: 22
- Damage: $122.571 million (2024 USD)
- Areas affected: West South Central states
- Part of the Tornadoes of 2024

Between November 2–5, 2024, a tornado outbreak and flood event took place across the South-Central United States. The outbreak, late in the 2024 tornado season, produced multiple tornadoes across Oklahoma, Arkansas, and Texas, resulting in 11 injuries. Storms brought heavy rainfall to Missouri, resulting in 5 deaths attributed to flash flooding.

== Meteorological synopsis ==
=== November 2 ===
On November 1, a conditionally severe shortwave trough developed in the late evening across Arizona into New Mexico, which set the stage for the development of a mesoscale convective system the next day. On November 2, the Storm Prediction Center outlined a Slight (2/5) risk for severe weather over southwest Oklahoma, western Texas, and extreme southeastern New Mexico. A threat primarily existed for large hail, with gusty winds and tornadoes being possible, where outflow from the weak thunderstorms earlier in the day moved into the Permian Basin. A trough existed over California and moved into the Four Corners. The storm mode was expected to converge into a squall line as the evening continued, with the potential for severe conditions to persist overnight into Oklahoma being noted.

At 1930Z, a tornado watch was issued in New Mexico and Texas, where supercells were expected to develop and bring large hail up to 2.5 in (6.4 cm) and severe wind gusts of up to 70 mph (110 km/h), with tornadic potential being likely to develop later that evening. That evening, tornadoes developed in rural Lea County, New Mexico, but most severe impacts occurred after midnight. After dark, forecasters noted airmass recovery on the back side of an outflow boundary over Texas, as well as the possibility of semi-discrete supercells that did develop being capable of all hazards if they extended to the surface.

=== November 3 ===
As the previous night's storm system moved into Oklahoma, tornadoes would be reported in the very early morning. All hazards appeared possible, as strong storms within the warm sector continued to develop, aided by shear values of 40–50 knots and MLCAPE values between 1000 and 1500 J/kg.

=== November 4 ===
A deep trough was located over the southern Rocky Mountains, with ample moisture located in east-central Oklahoma and parts of north TX. The Storm Prediction Center issued an Enhanced(3/5) risk for parts of Oklahoma, Texas, Arkansas, and Missouri, warning of damaging winds, hail, and potentially strong tornadoes. A warm front advancing northeast through Oklahoma allowed for severe weather to erupt across the region.

== Confirmed tornadoes ==
Confirmed tornadoes by Enhanced Fujita rating
EFU	EF0	EF1	EF2	EF3	EF4	EF5	Total
12	12	14	3	3	0	0	44

=== November 2 event ===
List of confirmed tornadoes – Saturday, November 2, 2024 (Note: All dates are based on the local time zone where the tornado touched down; however, all times are in Coordinated Universal Time for consistency.)
EF#	Location	County / Parish	State	Start Coord.	Time (UTC)	Path length	Max width
EFU	NW of Eunice	Lea	NM	32.53°N 103.35°W	21:04–21:08	1.29 mi (2.08 km)	50 yd (46 m)
EFU	A weak tornado was observed over open fields near Oil Center, causing no known damage. This is the first tornado ever documented in New Mexico in the month of November.						
EFU	E of Eunice	Lea	NM	32.45°N 103.41°W	22:50–23:07	6.27 mi (10.09 km)	200 yd (180 m)
EFU	A tornado traveled slowly over open terrain, causing no damage. It was documented by numerous storm chasers.						
EF0	NNE of Wanette	Pottawatomie	OK	34.983°N 97.028°W	04:10–04:12	1 mi (1.6 km)	30 yd (27 m)
EF0	A barn was damaged.						
EFU	E of Tribbey	Pottawatomie	OK	35.08°N 96.991°W	04:24	0.3 mi (0.48 km)	30 yd (27 m)
EFU	A tornadic debris signature was noted on radar but no damage was reported.						

=== November 3 event ===
List of confirmed tornadoes – Sunday, November 3, 2024
EF#	Location	County / Parish	State	Start Coord.	Time (UTC)	Path length	Max width
EF3	Eastern Oklahoma City	Cleveland, Oklahoma	OK	35.364°N 97.438°W	06:20–06:25	2.4 mi (3.9 km)	400 yd (370 m)
EF3	This tornado developed in southeast Oklahoma City, and moved north-northeast. A number of homes were damaged, including at least one with most of the exterior walls collapsed and significant roof damage. The tornado moved through neighborhoods, damaging dozens of homes. The tornado turned more north as it approached I-240 and quickly dissipated. Six people were injured, and the tornado caused $16 million in property damage.						
EF1	S of Byers	Clay	TX	34.05°N 98.187°W	06:33–06:46	8.4 mi (13.5 km)	250 yd (230 m)
EF1	At least two homes experienced significant roof damage, a couple of barns were significantly damaged and a few large trees were snapped or uprooted.						
EFU	Midwest City	Oklahoma	OK	35.454°N 97.357°W	06:37	0.1 mi (0.16 km)	10 yd (9.1 m)
EFU	A tornadic debris signature was noted on radar but no damage could be found.						
EF3	S of Comanche to NW of Velma	Stephens	OK	34.291°N 97.969°W	07:05–07:35	21.7 mi (34.9 km)	500 yd (460 m)
EF3	This intense tornado damaged at least two dozen buildings, including a number of homes that were destroyed. Hundreds of trees were reported downed along the path as well as numerous power lines and power poles. Numerous large trees were destroyed and debarked at the tornado moved over the Comanche Golf Course and Comanche Lake. After crossing the lake, the tornado continued northeast crossing SH-7 and dissipated a few miles southwest of Lake Fuqua. Six people were injured.						
EF1	NE of Blanchard to Newcastle	McClain	OK	35.171°N 97.638°W	07:13–07:21	7 mi (11 km)	200 yd (180 m)
EF1	A high-end EF1 tornado touched down in the northern part of Blanchard and moved north-northeast. The tornado initially did some tree limb damage and damage to one house. The tornado then moved into Newcastle, damaging trees and homes as it moved through neighborhoods in town. Newcastle Elementary School received significant roof damage as the tornado continued to move north just west of US-62, where it ultimately lifted.						
EF1	ENE of Duncan to SSW of Bray	Stephens	OK	34.534°N 97.869°W	07:28–07:30	1.3 mi (2.1 km)	50 yd (46 m)
EF1	A mobile home was pushed off of its foundation.						
EF2	SW of Purdy	Stephens, Garvin	OK	34.63°N 97.65°W	07:50–07:54	4.85 mi (7.81 km)	300 yd (270 m)
EF2	This strong tornado damaged the roof of a home significantly. Multiple trees and power poles were also damaged.						
EF3	Southeastern Oklahoma City to western Harrah to Warwick	Oklahoma, Lincoln	OK	35.4°N 97.242°W	07:57–08:28	25.1 mi (40.4 km)	1,000 yd (910 m)
EF3	An intense tornado developed in southeastern Oklahoma City and then moved north and northeast causing damage to trees, power lines and a few homes. The tornado then moved through neighborhoods causing strong to intense damage throughout them. The tornado continued moving northeast across western Harrah and Horseshoe Lake producing more strong damage before weakening as it entered Lincoln County. The tornado then entered the western portion of Warwick destroying at least one mobile home and significantly damaging a couple others. A few homes suffered roof damage, and numerous trees and power poles also had damage inflicted before the tornado lifted. Seven people were injured.						
EF0	Western Norman	Cleveland	OK	35.215°N 97.513°W	07:58–08:01	1.05 mi (1.69 km)	30 yd (27 m)
EF0	A sporadic, weak tornado damaged the sunroom of a home and caused minor damage to trees.						
EF1	NNW of Elmore City	Garvin	OK	34.68°N 97.434°W	08:17–08:18	0.79 mi (1.27 km)	50 yd (46 m)
EF1	An outbuilding was destroyed, and trees and power poles were damaged.						
EF1	W of Pauls Valley	Garvin	OK	34.738°N 97.364°W	08:22–08:25	2.5 mi (4.0 km)	300 yd (270 m)
EF1	One home suffered roof damage, a barn suffered roof and siding damage, and numerous trees were damaged.						
EF1	NNE of Konawa	Seminole	OK	35.024°N 96.722°W	09:04–09:06	1 mi (1.6 km)	30 yd (27 m)
EF1	Approximately fifteen to twenty trees were snapped or uprooted.						
EF0	W of Kellyville	Creek	OK	35.916°N 96.321°W	09:46–09:52	4.6 mi (7.4 km)	400 yd (370 m)
EF0	Several outbuildings were severely damaged, a couple of trees were uprooted, numerous large tree limbs were snapped, and power poles were blown down.						
EFU	WSW of Waldron	Scott	AR	34.8914°N 94.1103°W	14:35–14:36	0.17 mi (0.27 km)	30 yd (27 m)
EFU	A tornado was recorded over open field. No known damage occurred.						
EFU	WNW of Tupelo	Coal	OK	34.626°N 96.461°W	23:15	0.3 mi (0.48 km)	30 yd (27 m)
EFU	A storm spotter reported a tornado.						
EFU	ESE of Coalgate	Coal	OK	34.516°N 96.14°W	00:39	0.5 mi (0.80 km)	50 yd (46 m)
EFU	A storm chaser observed a cone tornado. No damage was reported.						

=== November 4 event ===
List of confirmed tornadoes – Monday, November 4, 2024
EF#	Location	County / Parish	State	Start Coord.	Time (UTC)	Path length	Max width
EF0	E of Lexington	Cleveland	OK	35.019°N 97.21°W	16:26–16:28	1.3 mi (2.1 km)	30 yd (27 m)
EF0	A shed had its roof damaged.						
EF0	S of Wynnewood	Murray	OK	34.619°N 97.161°W	17:49	0.2 mi (0.32 km)	10 yd (9.1 m)
EF0	An off-duty SPC employee observed a small, weak tornado do minor damage to tree limbs.						
EF1	WSW of Sperry	Osage	OK	36.266°N 96.084°W	18:20–18:26	2.2 mi (3.5 km)	100 yd (91 m)
EF1	This tornado caused tree damage and removed much of the roof of a metal building.						
EF1	NE of Vera	Washington	OK	36.494°N 95.84°W	18:47–18:48	0.6 mi (0.97 km)	150 yd (140 m)
EF1	A roof was blown off an outbuilding, and trees were uprooted.						
EF1	NE of Vera to W of Watova	Rogers, Nowata	OK	36.508°N 95.812°W	18:49–19:04	9.6 mi (15.4 km)	400 yd (370 m)
EF1	This tornado caused tree damage and passed a Mesonet site where a wind gust of 94 mph (151 km/h) was recorded.						
EFU	SW of Plainview	Yell	AR	34.8478°N 93.4856°W	20:33–20:36	2.38 mi (3.83 km)	190 yd (170 m)
EFU	Satellite imagery showed uprooted and/or snapped trees in inaccessible areas. A tornado debris signature was also observed on two radars.						
EFU	W of Haskell	Muskogee	OK	35.8184°N 95.7505°W	20:34	0.2 mi (0.32 km)	75 yd (69 m)
EFU	A brief tornado was recorded. No damage was reported.						
EFU	SW of Webbers Falls	Muskogee	OK	35.4764°N 95.1579°W	20:42	0.1 mi (0.16 km)	75 yd (69 m)
EFU	A storm chaser recorded a brief tornado.						
EFU	SSW of Paradise Hill	Sequoyah	OK	35.5929°N 95.0705°W	20:57	0.2 mi (0.32 km)	100 yd (91 m)
EFU	A brief tornado was recorded by storm chasers as it remained over open country.						
EF2	NNE of Cookson, OK to Tenkiller, OK to NW of Norwood, AR	Cherokee (OK), Adair (OK), Washington (AR), Benton (AR)	OK, AR	35.785°N 94.861°W	21:21–22:11	32.9 mi (52.9 km)	1,200 yd (1,100 m)
EF2	This long-tracked tornado formed near Tenkiller, where tree damage occurred, and outbuildings were destroyed. More trees, outbuildings, and homes were damaged as the tornado continued to track northeast through rural Oklahoma. The tornado then reached its peak width as it approached the state line with Arkansas, where trees were uprooted before the tornado dissipated after passing over AR 16.						
EFU	NE of Oark to SW of Nail	Johnson, Newton	AR	35.7289°N 93.4415°W	22:09–22:11	0.9 mi (1.4 km)	30 yd (27 m)
EFU	A tornado debris signature was observed on three radars, but no known damage could be found due to it being in inaccessible areas.						
EF1	E of Siloam Springs	Benton	AR	36.153°N 94.488°W	22:11–22:19	4.6 mi (7.4 km)	550 yd (500 m)
EF1	This tornado developed and moved northeastward, crossing US 412 along its path. Numerous trees were uprooted, a few trees and power poles were snapped, outbuildings were destroyed, and a few homes were damaged.						
EF2	Northern Rogers to Little Flock	Benton	AR	36.351°N 94.146°W	22:53–23:02	3.8 mi (6.1 km)	375 yd (343 m)
EF2	A low-end EF2 tornado damaged trees and apartment buildings after touching down in Rogers before entering Little Flock. In Little Flock, businesses and multiple homes were damaged, and trees were uprooted. Further northeast in town, a home was severely damaged, with an outbuilding also damaged nearby, and some trees snapped. The tornado dissipated after damaging the roofs of two more homes.						
EF1	NE of Idabel to S of Broken Bow	McCurtain	OK	33.9463°N 94.7729°W	23:01–23:08	3.08 mi (4.96 km)	150 yd (140 m)
EF1	Video from a storm chaser confirmed a weak tornado that snapped the trunk of a tree and downed a few large tree limbs.						
EF1	S of Annona to NW of Avery	Red River	TX	33.5104°N 94.911°W	23:40–23:47	7.47 mi (12.02 km)	275 yd (251 m)
EF1	An erratic tornado caused damage to numerous trees, some of which had their branches snapped or were uprooted.						
EF0	N of Elsey	Stone	MO	36.8563°N 93.5548°W	00:15–00:20	1.4 mi (2.3 km)	50 yd (46 m)
EF0	The roof of an outbuilding was lifted, trees were uprooted, a storage shed had its roof tossed, and more roof damage occurred to a church and a home. Some large tree branches were snapped as well.						
EF0	SW of Sweden	Douglas	MO	36.8524°N 92.54°W	00:26–00:27	0.01 mi (0.016 km)	50 yd (46 m)
EF0	A brief tornado downed tree limbs.						
EF0	NNE of Denlow	Douglas	MO	37.0065°N 92.3536°W	00:47–00:48	0.01 mi (0.016 km)	50 yd (46 m)
EF0	Tree branches were snapped and downed.						
EF0	S of Mountain Grove	Douglas	MO	37.0596°N 92.2601°W	00:55–00:56	0.01 mi (0.016 km)	50 yd (46 m)
EF0	Small tree limbs were downed.						
EF0	W of Truxton	Montgomery	MO	38.9842°N 91.3047°W	03:28–03:30	1.87 mi (3.01 km)	25 yd (23 m)
EF0	A brief tornado produced sporadic tree damage and lofted crop debris.						
EF0	N of Foristell to N of Flint Hill	St. Charles, Lincoln	MO	38.8355°N 90.9519°W	03:39–03:49	6.08 mi (9.78 km)	75 yd (69 m)
EF0	This weak tornado damaged several trees, a pole barn, and inflicted minor damage to a residence.						

=== November 5 event ===
List of confirmed tornadoes – Tuesday, November 5, 2024
EF#	Location	County / Parish	State	Start Coord.	Time (UTC)	Path length	Max width
EF1	w of Basile	Acadia, Evangeline	LA	30.4752°N 92.6223°W	14:07–14:11	0.99 mi (1.59 km)	150 yd (140 m)
EF1	A tornado initially damaged a few trees, rolled a camper, and ripped an awning off a house. A meat market was then struck, injuring three people. A cinder block wall fell over and the market lost a quarter of its roofing. An old barn behind the market was damaged. Minor tree and power pole damage continued for a few minutes afterwards before the tornado lifted.						
EF1	N of Kaplan to S of Rayne	Vermilion, Lafayette, Acadia	LA	30.1118°N 92.3001°W	14:41–14:50	4.99 mi (8.03 km)	300 yd (270 m)
EF1	A garage was destroyed, a mobile home was shifted off its foundation, and part of the roof of a home was removed. Another old frame home was completely destroyed.						
EF0	ESE of Belknap	Davis	IA	40.803°N 92.3482°W	17:01–17:02	0.33 mi (0.53 km)	50 yd (46 m)
EF0	Two metal buildings were damaged from a high-end EF0 tornado.						

== Non-tornadic effects ==
In Idabel, Oklahoma, a swath of wind damage estimated to 91 mph (146 km/h) caused major damage to a vehicle showroom.

=== Flooding in Missouri ===
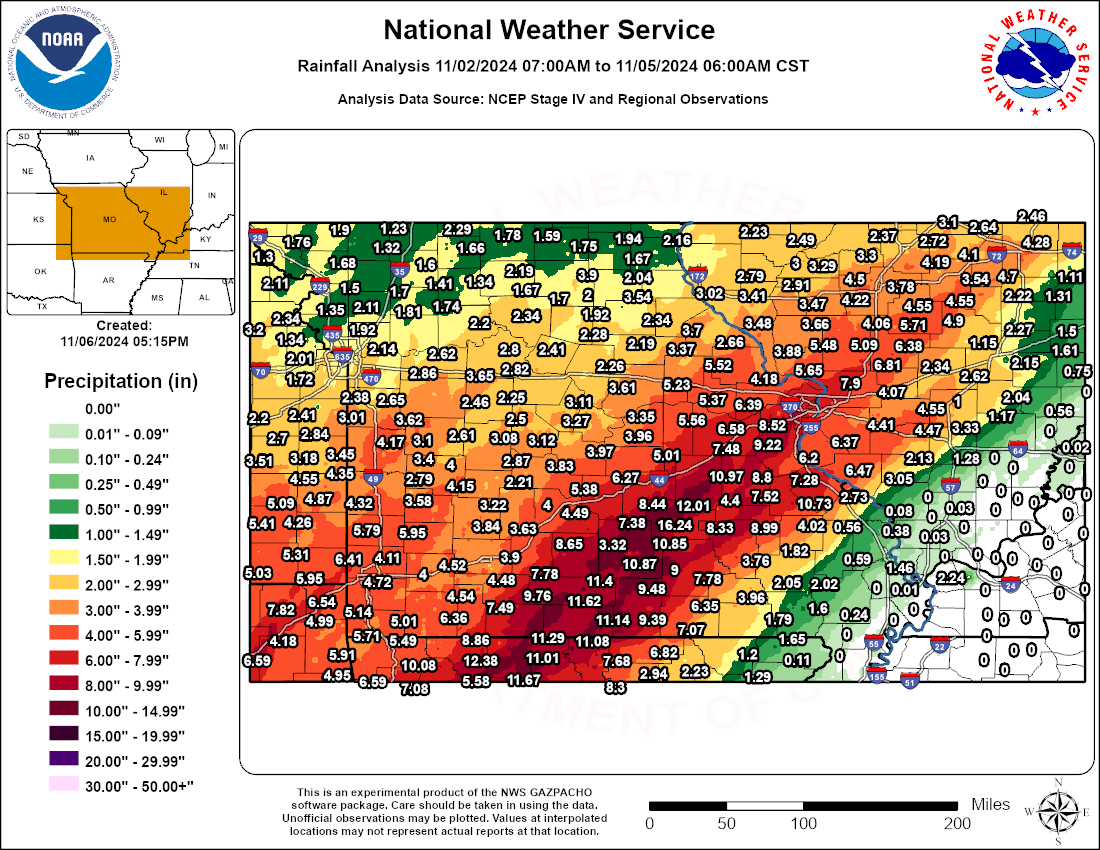
Rainfall totals between November 2 and 5, 2024 over Missouri and surrounding states

Significant flooding occurred across Missouri as a result of the storm system. St. Louis Lambert International Airport experienced record rainfall, with 3.89 in (9.9 cm) falling on November 5, far exceeding the previous record of 1.62 in (4.1 cm) from 1956, also exceeding the November maximum daily rainfall record set the day previous at 3.75 in (9.5 cm), which itself broke a longstanding 1921 record of 3.56 in (9.0 cm). Rivers across the state experienced "extreme rises" in their water levels, with the Meramec River forecasted to remain above major flood stage for days after the event. West of Salem, Missouri, 48 hour rainfall totals reached 18.52 in (470 mm). St. Louis saw record November rainfall from the storms. Near Akers, Missouri, the Current River was estimated to reach a record flood stage of 32 feet (9.8 m) (the gauge stopped reporting after reaching 23.23 feet (7.08 m)), exceeding the location's previous record level of 26.08 feet (7.95 m). Significant damage occurred at Pulltite, where water levels at the campground exceeded the height of the Pulltite Ranger Station, sweeping away the picnic pavilion, removing the amphitheater from its foundation, and causing significant damage to campground roadways.

In all, flooding across the state killed five, with three perishing near Gravois Creek. The bodies of two poll workers for the November 5 elections were found around 4:30 am on the morning of November 5, having been caught in flooding at Beaver Creek over four hours earlier.

== Aftermath ==
Oklahoma governor Kevin Stitt declared a state of emergency for parts of Oklahoma on November 4, following that day's tornadoes. On November 5, Missouri governor Mike Parson declared a state of emergency until December 5 due to flooding and severe weather.

Following less voter turnout then expected in the 2024 elections due to flooding, Denny Hoskins, the elected secretary of state, proposed setting up an emergency contingency plan for voting during severe weather.

== See also ==
- List of North American tornadoes and tornado outbreaks
- Tornado outbreak sequence of May 21–26, 2011
- Tornado outbreak of May 20–21, 2019
- Tornado outbreak of November 4–5, 2022
- Tornado outbreak sequence of May 19–27, 2024
