= Nail =

Nail usually refers to:

- Nail (anatomy), toughened protective protein-keratin at the end of an animal or human digit, such as fingernail
- Nail (fastener), the pin-shaped fastener used in engineering, woodworking and construction

Nail or Nails may also refer to:

== Objects ==
- Nail (relic), used in the crucifixion of Christ
- The Exchange nails, bronze tables outside of The Exchange, Bristol

== Arts and entertainment ==
- JLA: The Nail series, a 1998 three-issue comic book miniseries
- Nail (album), by Scraping Foetus Off The Wheel (1985)
- Nail (EP), by Yves (2026)
- Nails (1979 film), a Canadian short documentary film
- Nails (1992 film), an American TV film
- Nails (2003 film), a Russian psychological horror film
- Nails (2017 film), a horror film directed by Dennis Bartok
- Nails (band), an American powerviolence band founded 2009
- Nine Inch Nails, an American industrial rock band founded 1988
- The Nails, an American new wave band founded 1976 as The Ravers (name change 1977)

== People ==
- Nail (given name), a list of people with the given name Nail
- Nail (surname), a list of people with the surname Nail or Nails
- Lenny Dykstra, a former Major League Baseball outfielder nicknamed "Nails"
- Samuel Morton (1893–1923), an American mobster nicknamed "Nails"

== Businesses ==
- Nail Brewing, an Australian brewery
- Nail Communications, an American advertising agency
- Nails Inc., an English nail care chain

== Other uses ==
- Nail (beak), a plate of hard horny tissue at the tip of some bird beaks
- Nail (unit), an archaic multiplier equal to one sixteenth of a base unit
- Nail, Arkansas, an unincorporated community in the United States
- Nail, project name for the Heirloom Project mailx Unix computer utility
- Soil nailing, a soil-stabilization technique

== See also ==
- NAIL (disambiguation)
- Naili
- Knell
- Neil (disambiguation)
- Nell
