= NAIL =

NAIL may refer to:

- New approaches to international law (NAIL)
- Neurotics Anonymous, abbreviated NAIL to avoid confusion with Narcotics Anonymous (NA)

== See also ==
- Nail (disambiguation)
