= Chatawa, Mississippi =

- Unincorporated community
- Location within Mississippi Location within the United States
- Coordinates: 31°03′38″N 90°28′20″W
- Country: United States
- State: Mississippi
- County: Pike
- Elevation: 253 ft (77 m)
- Time zone: UTC-6 (Central (CST))
  - Summer (DST): UTC-5 (CDT)
- ZIP code: 39632
- Area codes: 601 & 769
- GNIS feature ID: 691764

Chatawa is an unincorporated community in Pike County, Mississippi, United States. Its ZIP code is 39632.

== History ==
Chatawa is located on the Tangipahoa River and the former Illinois Central Railroad. The community derives its name from the Choctaw language, the etymology of which is believed to mean either "to be swollen" or "hunting ground". The area around Chatawa was originally occupied by the Choctaw. In 1810, the Carter family settled in the area. Prior to the Civil War, aristocratic families from New Orleans owned summer homes in Chatawa. A number of these homes were owned by officials of the Illinois Central Railroad. Many early members of the community used the artesian well in Chatawa, which is still flowing in the present day. The Stevens Lumber Company and LeBlanc Lumber Company operated lumber mills in Chatawa in the early 1900s.

Redemptorist priests bought property in Chatawa to establish a seminary and preparatory college. In 1879, the property was sold to Mother Caroline Friess, the founder of School Sisters of Notre Dame (SSND) of North America. From 1884 to 1975, St. Mary's Institute, later known as St. Mary of the Pines, operated on the location as a boarding school. The facility was then used as a retreat center and retirement home for SSND sisters. In 2021, Fr. Mark Beard began operating the property as Our Lady of Hope Retreat Center.

In 1941, Maureen O'Hara married Will Price at the Chapel of St. Teresa at St. Mary's Institute in Chatawa.

Kramer's Lodge in Chatawa was originally built as a resort by X. A. Kramer, the former mayor of McComb. Exotic birds and animals, including bears and monkeys, were caged around the property and Huey P. Long regularly visited the resort.

== Chatawa Monster ==
The Chatawa Monster is a cryptid that is said to inhabit the swamps around Chatawa. Said to resemble Bigfoot, the purported creature is allegedly responsible for strange claw marks on trees and has been implicated in reports of missing poultry. Tradition holds that the Chatawa Monster escaped from a wrecked circus train near the Tangipahoa River. Other sources claim the animal was an escaped monkey from the local Kramer's Lodge or a story crafted by older students at the nearby St. Mary's Institute.
