= Nail (given name) =

Nail is a masculine given name of Turkish origin. In Turkish, it refers to those who accomplish their goals and are conquerors. Notable people with the name include:

== Given name ==
- Nail Bakirov (1952–2010), Russian statistician and professor
- Nail Beširović (born 1967), Bosnian football player
- Nail Çakırhan (1910–2008), Turkish poet, journalist, architect, and house restorer
- Nail Elmastaşoğlu (born 1933), Turkish football player
- Nail Galimov (born 1966), Russian football coach and player
- Nail Gönenli (1924–1969), Turkish equestrian
- Nail H. Ibragimov (1939–2018), Russian mathematician and mathematical physicist
- Nail Ibrahimli (1994–2020), Azerbaijani military officer
- Nail Kutlugildin (1946–2026), Russian Bashkir politician
- Nail Magzhanov (born 1980), Russian football player
- Nail Minibayev (born 1985), Russian football player
- Nail Mukhamedyarov (born 1962), Russian weightlifter
- Nail Omerović (born 2002), Bosnian footballer
- Nail Umyarov (born 2000), Russian footballer
- Nail Yakupov (born 1993), Russian hockey player
- Nail Zamaliyev (born 1989), Russian football player

== Fictional ==
- Nail, a minor protagonist of Dragon Ball Z

== See also ==
- Naili, list of people with a similar name
