= Nails (2003 film) =

Nails Гвозди
- Directed by: Andrey Iskanov
- Written by: Andrey Iskanov
- Produced by: Andrey Iskanov
- Starring: Alexander Shevchenko; Irina Nikitina; Svyatoslav Iliyasov; Andrey Iskanov; Alexandra Batrumova
- Cinematography: Andrey Iskanov
- Edited by: Andrey Iskanov
- Music by: Alexander Shevchenko
- Distributed by: Unearthed Films
- Release dates: 1 October 2003 (Russia); 26 August 2006 (United States)
- Running time: 62 minutes
- Country: Russia
- Language: Russian
- Budget: ₽10 000

Nails (Russian: Гвозди) is a 2003 Russian social fiction film directed, written and produced by Andrey Iskanov. The film stars Alexander Shevchenko and Irina Nikitina in the lead roles.

== Plot ==
The protagonist (who, along with all other characters, is unnamed) is a hit man. After returning home after yet another job, he is unable to sleep on account of a sudden on-set of terrible headaches. No medication helps. Desperate to cope with the pain and experiencing terrible agony, the protagonist loses consciousness and collapses. Upon awakening, the protagonist finds a journal entry about a madman, after whose death doctors found numerous rusty nails in his head. In a semi-delirious state, and having studied the patterns of brain sensitivity, the protagonist decides to drive a nail into his head, which he successfully does. After this the headache disappears, but the protagonist begins to see the world in a different and distorted way.

== Cast ==
Cast
Name	Role	Notes #
Andrey Iskanov		
Svyatoslav Iliyasov		
Irina Nikitina		
Alexander Shevchenko		
Victor Silkin		
