= Nail (surname) =

Nail or Nails is a surname. Notable people with the surname include:

- Bethanie Nail (born 1956), Australian retired runner
- Bobby Nail (1925–1995), American bridge player
- David Nail (born 1979), American country music singer-songwriter
- Jimmy Nail (born 1954), English actor and singer
- John E. Nail (1883–1947), African-American real estate agent
- Debra Nails (born 1950), American philosophy professor and classics scholar
- Jamie Nails (born 1977), American former National Football League player

== See also ==
- Bernard Le Nail (1946–2010), French writer and Breton militant
