= Naili =

Naili (Arabic: نائلی) is an Arabic origin masculine given name and surname. The name is used in Turkey with the same meaning of Nail: "accomplished, conquered." It is a variant of Nail attached with the Turkish accusative case marker -i. It was used in the Ottoman period as the pseudonym of a well-known Divan poet.

Notable people with the name include:

== Surname ==
- Billel Naïli (born 1986), Algerian football player
- Mokhtar Naili (born 1953), Tunisian football player
- Nahla El Fatiha Naili (born 1986), Algerian sculptor
- Nihed Naili (born 2001), Algerian football player
- Samiha Naili, Egyptian table tennis player

== Given name ==
=== First name ===
- Naili Abdullah Pasha (died August 1758), Ottoman statesman
- Naili Moran (1908–1968), Turkish basketball player

=== Middle name ===
- Ali Naili Erdem (born 1927), Turkish lawyer and politician
- Mustafa Naili Pasha (1798–1871), Ottoman statesman
- Pertev Naili Boratav (1907–1998), Turkish folklorist and academic
- Şükrü Naili Gökberk (1876–1936), Ottoman Turkish army officer and politician
