= New approaches to international law =

Critical theory movement

New approaches to international law (NAIL) is a subfield, but not a coherent movement, related to critical legal studies and Third World approaches to international law. A "unifying factor is the common desire to rethink the foundations of international law and create space for emancipatory politics".
