= Scotland, Mississippi =

- Unincorporated community
- Location within the state of Mississippi
- Coordinates: 32°42′19″N 90°13′16″W
- Country: United States
- State: Mississippi
- County: Yazoo
- Elevation: 230 ft (70 m)
- Time zone: UTC-6 (Central (CST))
  - Summer (DST): UTC-5 (CDT)
- GNIS feature ID: 690989

Scotland is an unincorporated community in Yazoo County, Mississippi, United States.

The settlement is located on Scotland Road, approximately 12 mi (19 km) southeast of Yazoo City.

The Scotland Church and Cemetery are located south of the settlement.

Residents are within the Yazoo County School District. Residents are zoned to Yazoo County Middle School and Yazoo County High School.
