= Ten Mile, Mississippi =

- Unincorporated community
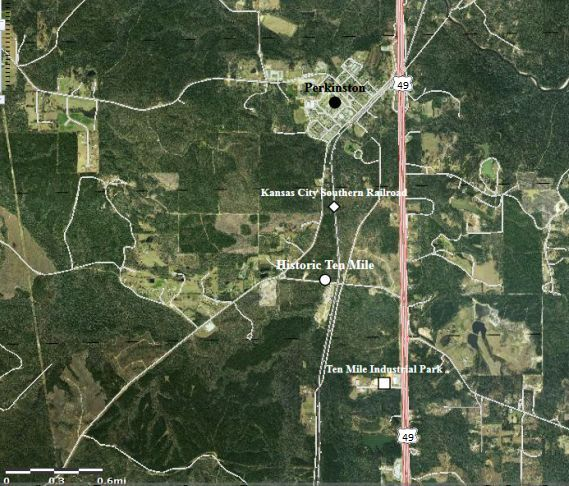
- Aerial view of Ten Mile community

- Location within Mississippi Location within the United States
- Coordinates: 30°45′56″N 89°08′37″W
- Country: United States
- State: Mississippi
- County: Stone
- Elevation: 130 ft (40 m)
- Time zone: UTC-6 (Central (CST))
  - Summer (DST): UTC-5 (CDT)
- ZIP code: 39573
- Area code: Area code 601
- GNIS feature ID: 678623

Ten Mile, also known as Tenmile, is an unincorporated community in Stone County, Mississippi, United States, located approximately 1.15 miles (1.85 km) south of Perkinston. Ten Mile is part of the Gulfport-Biloxi metropolitan area. The main period of significance was between 1904 and 1923.

== History ==
Early in the 20th century, Ten Mile had a post office and railroad station. Ten Mile developed along the Gulf and Ship Island Railroad (now Kansas City Southern Railroad) as a sawmill community, and was the site of Ten Mile Lumber Company from 1899 to 1922. Ten Mile Lumber Company was incorporated in 1903, and produced from 60,000 to 75,000 board feet of southern yellow pine lumber per day. Ten Mile Lumber Company was sold to L.N. Dantzler Lumber Company in 1910, and Dantzler continued to operate the sawmill until 1922, when the mill closed.

In 1937, Dantzler built a new sawmill and office at Ten Mile, on the site of the former mill. In 1946, Dantzler moved their headquarters from Moss Point, Mississippi to Ten Mile. The new mill produced southern pine lumber until 1949, when Dantzler ended their logging and sawmill operations to concentrate on tree farming, but the company continued to operate out of their Ten Mile office.

In 1966, L.N. Dantzler Lumber Company was sold to International Paper Company, and the Ten Mile company office was used by International Paper as a location for monitoring the company's timberland holdings in south Mississippi through the end of the 20th century.

In 1870, Ten Mile Baptist Church was organized and was still active in 2021. Stone County's 80-acre (32 ha) Industrial Park and Bond-Saucier Cemetery are also located in the Ten Mile community.

== Transportation ==
- Highway: U.S. Route 49
- Railroad: Kansas City Southern Railroad

== Gallery ==
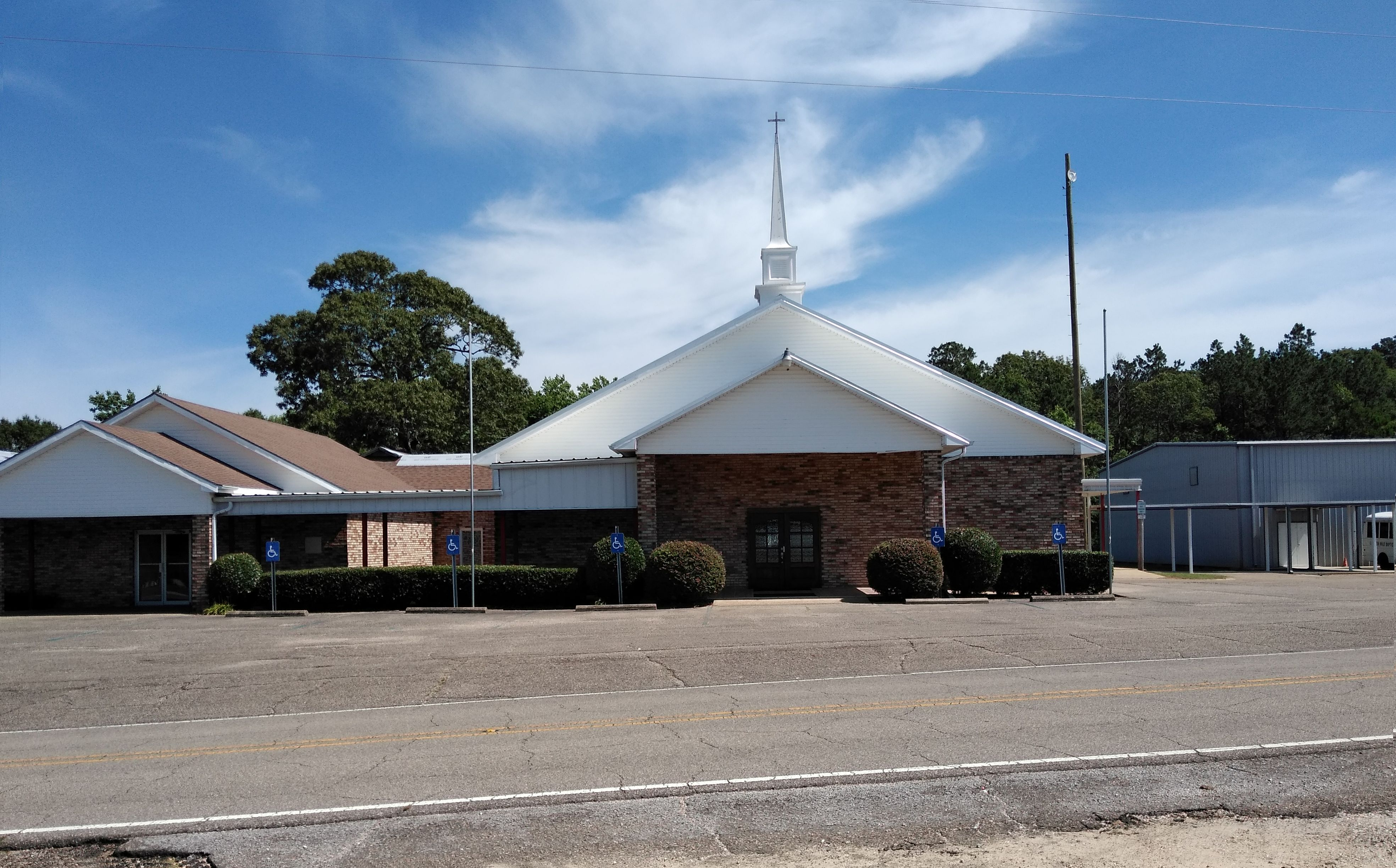
Ten Mile Baptist Church

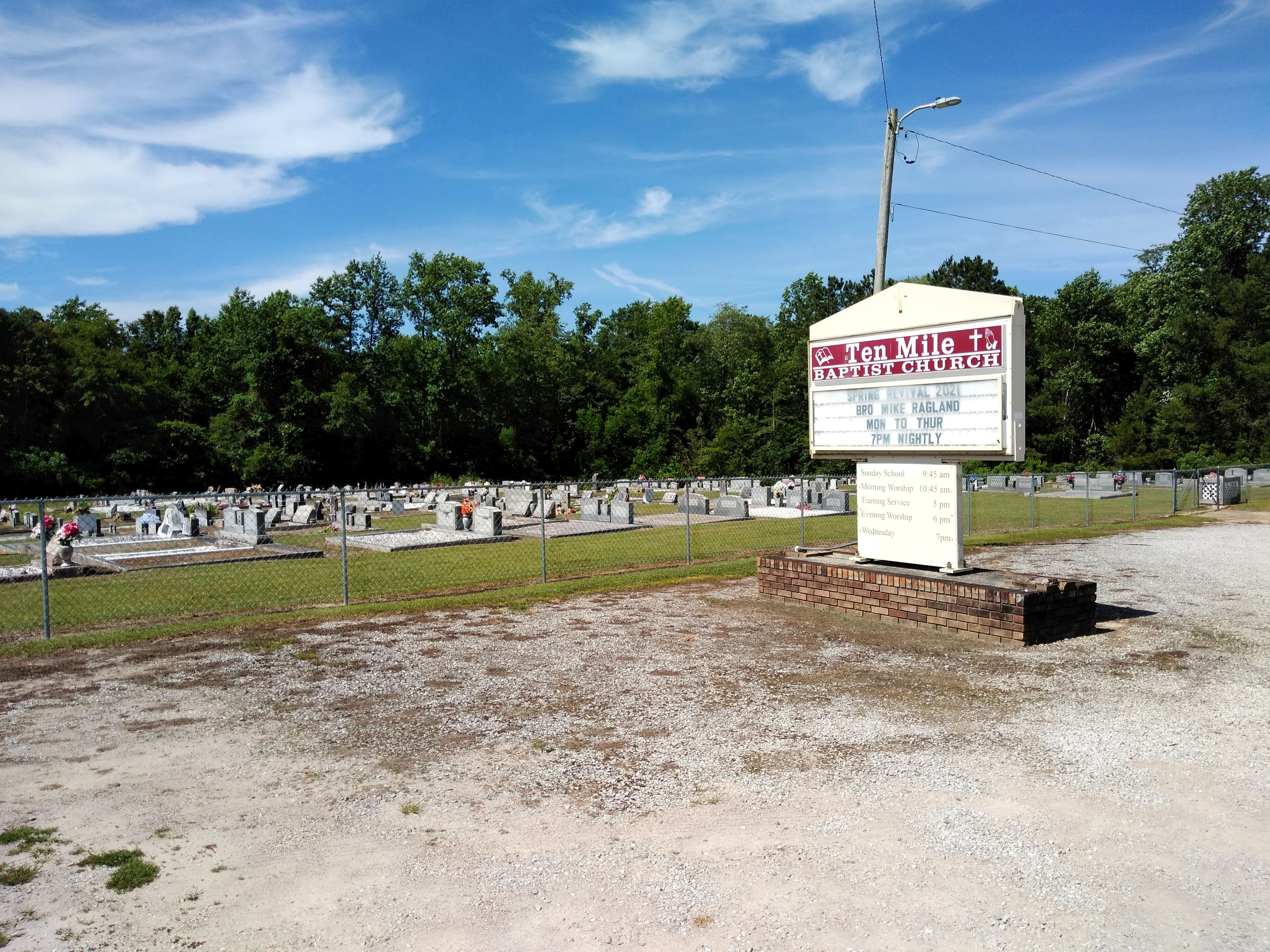
Ten Mile Baptist Church Cemetery

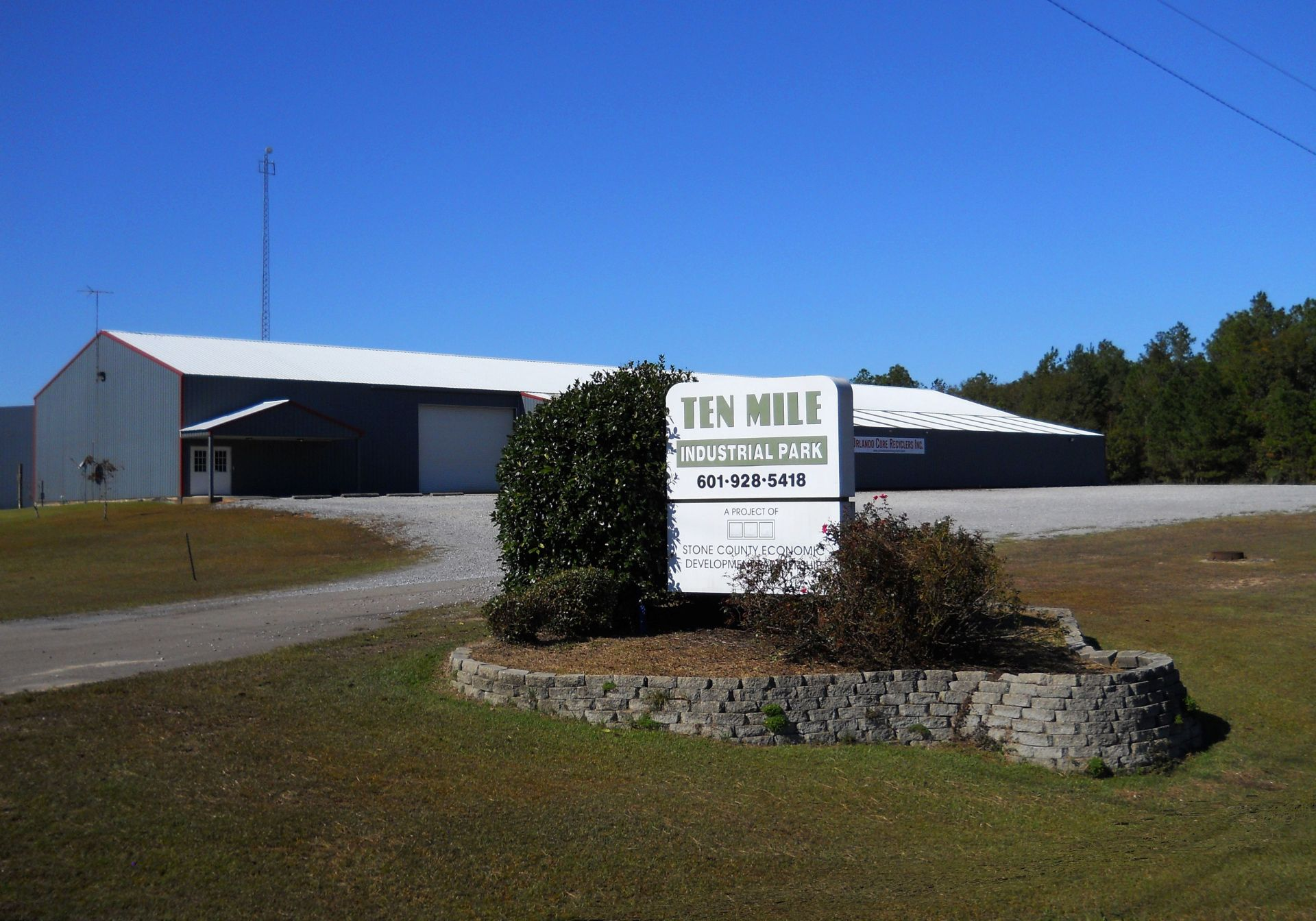
Stone County Industrial Park
