= Range, Alabama =

Unincorporated community in Brownsville, Alabama

- Unincorporated community
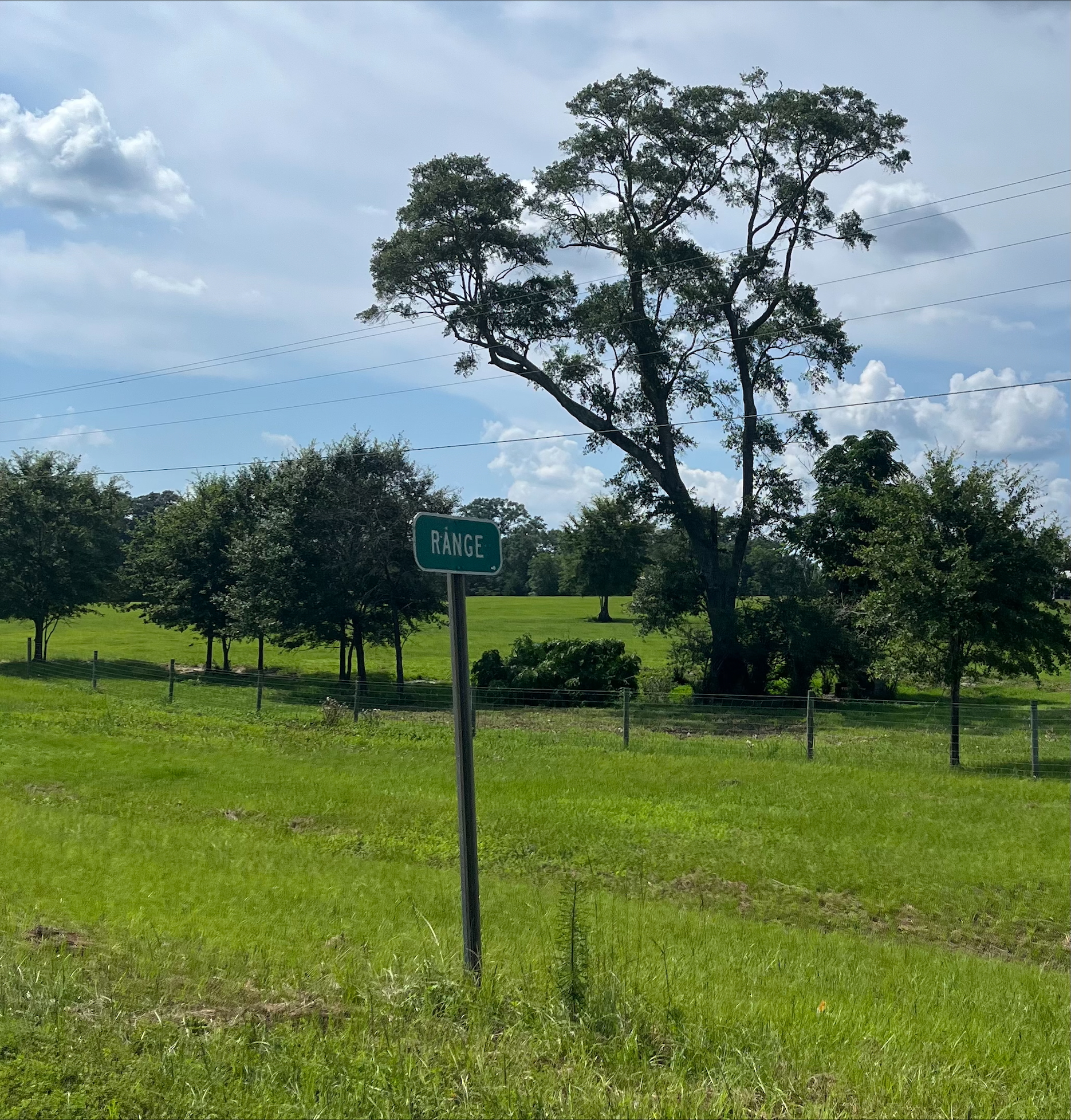
- Range sign

- Location within Alabama Location within the United States
- Coordinates: 31°18′46″N 87°14′08″W
- Country: United States
- State: Alabama
- County: Conecuh
- Elevation: 266 ft (81 m)
- Time zone: UTC-6 (Central (CST))
  - Summer (DST): UTC-5 (CDT)
- ZIP code: 36473
- Area code: 251
- GNIS feature ID: 125435

Range is an unincorporated community in Conecuh County, Alabama, United States. Range is located along Alabama State Route 41, 6.7 miles (10.8 km) south of Repton. Range has a post office with ZIP code 36473.
