= Vera, Oklahoma =

- Town
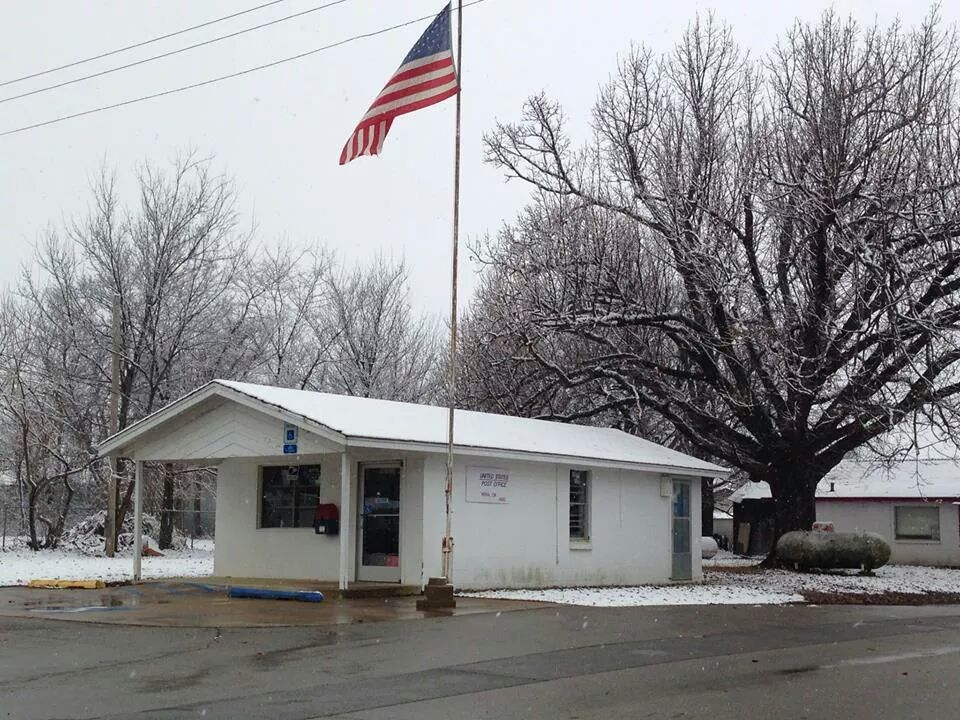
- Post Office in Vera (2014)

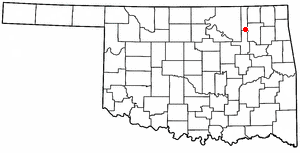
- Location of Vera, Oklahoma
- Coordinates: 36°25′26″N 95°53′34″W
- Country: United States
- State: Oklahoma
- County: Washington

Area
  - Total: 0.79 sq mi (2.05 km^{2})
  - Land: 0.79 sq mi (2.05 km^{2})
  - Water: 0 sq mi (0.00 km^{2})
- Elevation: 656 ft (200 m)

Population (2020)
  - Total: 334
  - Density: 422/sq mi (162.8/km^{2})
- Time zone: UTC-6 (Central (CST))
  - Summer (DST): UTC-5 (CDT)
- ZIP code: 74082
- Area codes: 539/918
- FIPS code: 40-76950
- GNIS feature ID: 2413427

Vera is a town in Washington County, Oklahoma, United States. The population was 334 as of the 2020 census.

== History ==
Originally known as Evans, the town was renamed Vera in November 1899 and incorporated in 1904. Vera lies seven miles southeast of Ramona and two miles east of U.S. Highway 75. Vera started out as a farming community, with the main crops being corn and hay. Lining the railroad track east of town were hay barns and a grain elevator. After many bountiful harvests of the local prairie hay Vera earned the nickname "the Hay Capital of the World."

== Geography ==
According to the United States Census Bureau, the town has a total area of 0.2 square miles (0.52 km^{2}), all land.

== Demographics ==
Historical population
Census	Pop.	Note	%±
1910	312		—
1920	209		−33.0%
1930	206		−1.4%
1940	208		1.0%
1950	164		−21.2%
1960	125		−23.8%
1970	215		72.0%
1980	182		−15.3%
1990	167		−8.2%
2000	188		12.6%
2010	241		28.2%
2020	334		38.6%
U.S. Decennial Census

=== 2020 census ===
As of the 2020 census, Vera had a population of 334. The median age was 46.7 years. 24.9% of residents were under the age of 18 and 18.0% of residents were 65 years of age or older. For every 100 females there were 94.2 males, and for every 100 females age 18 and over there were 99.2 males age 18 and over.

0.0% of residents lived in urban areas, while 100.0% lived in rural areas.

There were 118 households in Vera, of which 40.7% had children under the age of 18 living in them. Of all households, 64.4% were married-couple households, 13.6% were households with a male householder and no spouse or partner present, and 15.3% were households with a female householder and no spouse or partner present. About 12.7% of all households were made up of individuals and 5.9% had someone living alone who was 65 years of age or older.

There were 130 housing units, of which 9.2% were vacant. The homeowner vacancy rate was 1.8% and the rental vacancy rate was 0.0%.

Racial composition as of the 2020 census
Race	Number	Percent
White	241	72.2%
Black or African American	2	0.6%
American Indian and Alaska Native	29	8.7%
Asian	1	0.3%
Native Hawaiian and Other Pacific Islander	0	0.0%
Some other race	8	2.4%
Two or more races	53	15.9%
Hispanic or Latino (of any race)	21	6.3%

=== 2010 census ===
As of the census of 2010, there were 241 people, 84 households, and 56 families residing in the town. The population density was 938.5 inhabitants per square mile (362.4/km^{2}). There were 89 housing units at an average density of 384.4 per square mile (148.4/km^{2}).

There were 84 households, out of which 28.6% had children under the age of 18 living with them, 53.6% were married couples living together, 6.0% had a female householder with no husband present, and 33.3% were non-families. 23.8% of all households were made up of individuals, and 10.7% had someone living alone who was 65 years of age or older. The average household size was 2.58 and the average family size was 3.04.

In the town, the population was spread out, with 30.3% under the age of 18, 9.0% from 18 to 24, 29.8% from 25 to 44, 21.3% from 45 to 64, and 15.4% who were 65 years of age or older. The median age was 37 years. For every 100 females, there were 113.6 males. For every 100 females age 18 and over, there were 105.8 males.

The median income for a household in the town was $27,000, and the median income for a family was $32,083. Males had a median income of $30,000 versus $20,833 for females. The per capita income for the town was $12,013. About 6.4% of families and 9.1% of the population were below the poverty line, including 9.1% of those under the age of eighteen and 12.5% of those 65 or over.
