= Tribbey, Oklahoma =

- Town
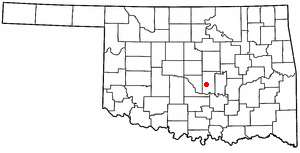
- Location of Tribbey, Oklahoma
- Coordinates: 35°06′02″N 97°05′45″W
- Country: United States
- State: Oklahoma
- County: Pottawatomie

Area
  - Total: 19.12 sq mi (49.51 km^{2})
  - Land: 19.07 sq mi (49.38 km^{2})
  - Water: 0.050 sq mi (0.13 km^{2})
- Elevation: 1,039 ft (317 m)

Population (2020)
  - Total: 337
  - Density: 17.7/sq mi (6.82/km^{2})
- Time zone: UTC-6 (Central (CST))
  - Summer (DST): UTC-5 (CDT)
- FIPS code: 40-74400
- GNIS feature ID: 2413400

Tribbey is a town in Pottawatomie County, Oklahoma, United States.The community was named for Alpheus M. Tribbey, landowner. The locale is old enough to appear on a 1911 Rand McNally map of the county. The population was 337 by the 2020 United States census.

== Geography ==
According to the United States Census Bureau, the town has a total area of 19.1 square miles (49 km^{2}), of which 19.0 square miles (49 km^{2}) is land and 0.1 square miles (0.26 km^{2}) (0.26%) is water.

== Demographics ==
Historical population
Census	Pop.	Note	%±
1980	215		—
1990	288		34.0%
2000	273		−5.2%
2010	391		43.2%
2020	337		−13.8%
U.S. Decennial Census

=== 2020 census ===
As of the 2020 census, Tribbey had a population of 337. The median age was 52.4 years. 14.8% of residents were under the age of 18 and 25.5% of residents were 65 years of age or older. For every 100 females there were 106.7 males, and for every 100 females age 18 and over there were 108.0 males age 18 and over.

0.0% of residents lived in urban areas, while 100.0% lived in rural areas.

There were 159 households in Tribbey, of which 25.8% had children under the age of 18 living in them. Of all households, 54.1% were married-couple households, 18.9% were households with a male householder and no spouse or partner present, and 22.0% were households with a female householder and no spouse or partner present. About 26.4% of all households were made up of individuals and 12.5% had someone living alone who was 65 years of age or older.

There were 171 housing units, of which 7.0% were vacant. The homeowner vacancy rate was 1.4% and the rental vacancy rate was 0.0%.

Racial composition as of the 2020 census
Race	Number	Percent
White	282	83.7%
Black or African American	0	0.0%
American Indian and Alaska Native	18	5.3%
Asian	1	0.3%
Native Hawaiian and Other Pacific Islander	1	0.3%
Some other race	6	1.8%
Two or more races	29	8.6%
Hispanic or Latino (of any race)	11	3.3%

=== 2000 census ===
As of the census of 2000, there were 273 people, 102 households, and 84 families living in the town. The population density was 14.3 people per square mile (5.5/km^{2}). There were 115 housing units at an average density of 6.0 per square mile (2.3/km^{2}). The racial makeup of the town was 91.21% White, 3.30% Native American, and 5.49% from two or more races. Hispanic or Latino of any race were 2.20% of the population.

There were 102 households, out of which 24.5% had children under the age of 18 living with them, 72.5% were married couples living together, 6.9% had a female householder with no husband present, and 17.6% were non-families. 16.7% of all households were made up of individuals, and 8.8% had someone living alone who was 65 years of age or older. The average household size was 2.68 and the average family size was 2.99.

In the town, the population was spread out, with 24.2% under the age of 18, 5.5% from 18 to 24, 24.2% from 25 to 44, 33.7% from 45 to 64, and 12.5% who were 65 years of age or older. The median age was 42 years. For every 100 females, there were 105.3 males. For every 100 females age 18 and over, there were 99.0 males.

The median income for a household in the town was $33,125, and the median income for a family was $40,000. Males had a median income of $30,962 versus $21,875 for females. The per capita income for the town was $13,846. None of the families and 0.4% of the population were living below the poverty line.

== Education ==
It is in the Wanette Public Schools school district.
