= Sweden, Missouri =

Unincorporated community in Missouri, U.S.

Coordinates: 36°52′39″N 92°30′04″W

Sweden is an unincorporated community in Douglas County, Missouri, United States. Sweden lies in the south-central part of the county. The former Sweden store is located on Missouri Route 14, one-half mile east of the intersection of Route 14 and State Route P. Sweden community church and cemetery lie one-quarter mile north of the former store location on a county road.

== History ==
A post office called Sweden was established in 1896, and remained in operation until 1956. The community's name was supposed to honor a resident with the surname Sweten (a recording error accounts for the error in spelling, which was never corrected).
