= Denlow, Missouri =

Unincorporated community in Missouri, US

Coordinates: 36°58′51″N 92°22′25″W

Denlow is an unincorporated community in north central Douglas County in the Ozarks of Missouri. Denlow is located on Missouri Route 76, just west of the Fox Creek bridge.

== History ==
A post office called Denlow was established in 1896, and remained in operation until 1919. An early variant name was "Upshaw".
