= Nail, Arkansas =

Unincorporated community in Arkansas, US

Coordinates: 35°49′28″N 93°17′35″W

Nail is an unincorporated community in Newton County, Arkansas, United States.

The origin of the name "Nail" is obscure.
