= Tornado outbreak of December 28–29, 2024 =

Southern United States tornado outbreak

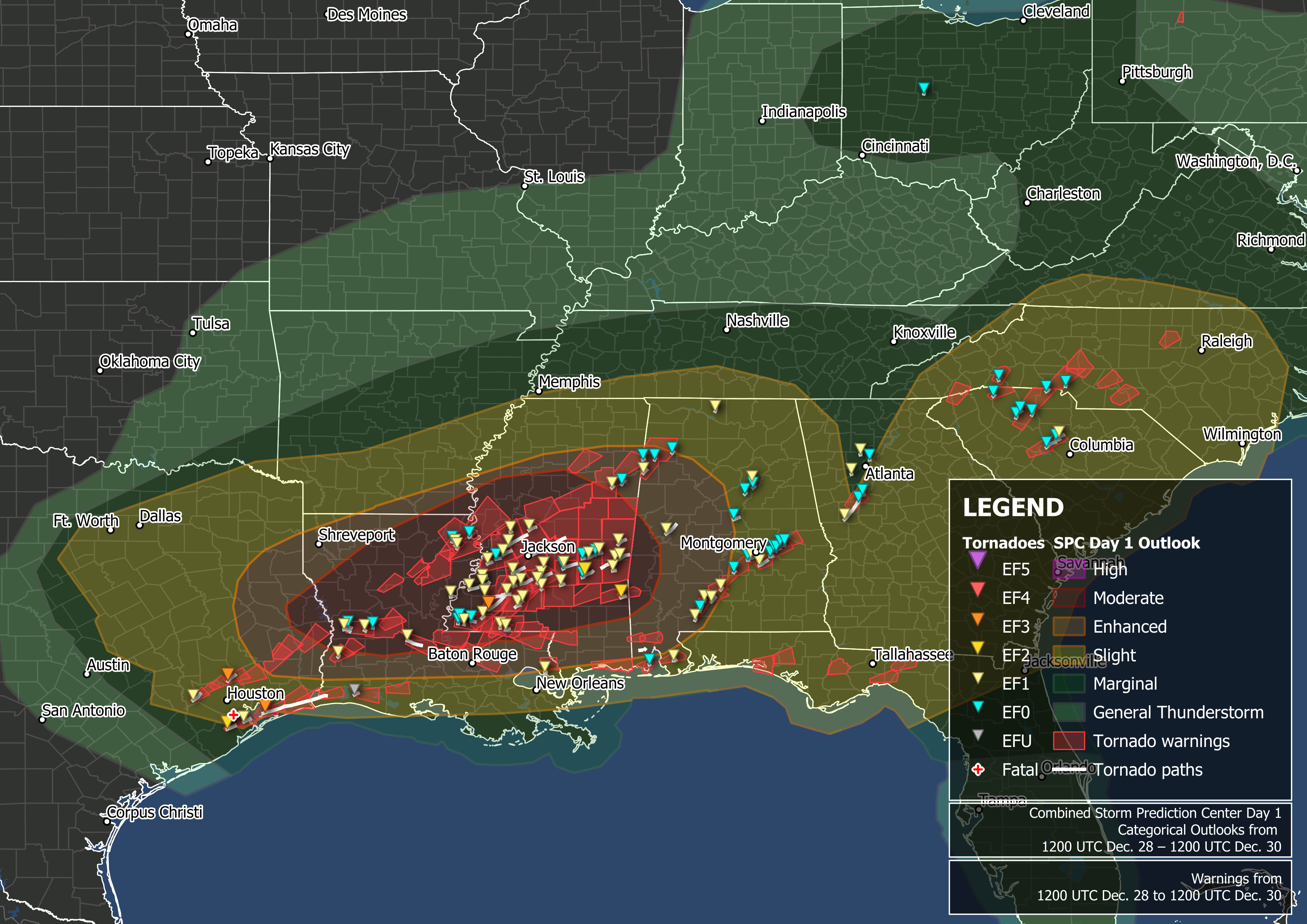
- Map of tornado warnings and confirmed tornadoes from the outbreak

Meteorological history
- Duration: December 28–29, 2024

Tornado outbreak
- Tornadoes: 110
- Max. rating: EF3 tornado
- Duration: 1 day, 15 hours, 57 minutes
- Highest winds: Tornadic – 161 mph (259 km/h) (Port Arthur, Texas EF3 on December 28)
- Largest hail: 2.75 in (7.0 cm); Dermot and Halley, Arkansas

Overall effects
- Fatalities: 1 (+3 non-tornadic)
- Injuries: 26 (+2 indirect)
- Damage: $15.068 million
- Areas affected: Deep South, Southeastern United States, Ohio Valley
- Power outages: ~93,000 across Mississippi
- Part of the Tornadoes of 2024

Between December 28–29, 2024, a late season tornado outbreak affected the Deep South. Multiple tornadoes caused severe damage in the Greater Houston area and in Port Arthur, Texas while additional tornadoes caused damage in other states, including Louisiana, Mississippi, and Alabama. Overall, at least four people have been killed; one in the Houston area, two in Mississippi and one in North Carolina, and 17 more have been injured, two indirectly. In total, 106 tornado warnings were issued during the outbreak and 110 tornadoes were confirmed, making this the second largest December outbreak on record behind only the December 2021 Midwest derecho and tornado outbreak, which had 120 tornadoes.

== Meteorological synopsis ==
=== Prior to December 28 ===
On December 21, the Storm Prediction Center first noted in their day 4–8 outlook that "An additional focus for increasing deep convective potential will be into the Thursday/Day 6, Friday/Day 7, and Saturday/Day 8 time frame", marking the first mention of a potential severe weather setup in the West South Central states, although confidence was limited mainly as a result of uncertainty regarding the evolution of the approaching upper-level trough and potential effects from a preceding trough and accompanying cold front ahead of it. This was further noted the next day, when forecasters highlighted the potential for severe weather across the Mississippi Valley, although forecast confidence remained too low for forecasters to delineate a risk area.

the Storm Prediction Center first noted in its Day 4–8 outlook as a result of low predictabilities and confidence to include one; the agency however noted a "low-end" severe weather potential on December 26. The Day 3 convective outlook released on December 24, denoted a slight (level 2/5) risk that included population centers and areas including Shreveport, Louisiana, College Station, Texas, Tyler, Texas and The Woodlands, Texas. A separate day 4–8 outlook published by the SPC mentioned further severe weather potential around the December 27–28 timeframe, although confidence was limited for a specific risk area during this time due to the uncertain extent of favorable instability/buoyancy accompanying the trough. This and uncertainty regarding morning convection affecting the main risk later in the day led to lowered confidence in issuing a risk area but the SPC noted at least "some" severe weather potential ahead of the favorable upper to mid-level synoptic support model guidance had showed for this time period. The Day 2 outlook on December 25 maintained the "slight" risk area; it was expanded into far-southern Arkansas. A 5% tornado risk was outlined within the "slight" risk area, accompanied by a 15% chance for hail and a 15% chance for damaging wind. The Day 1 Convective Outlook featured the addition of an "enhanced", level 3-of-5 risk for East Texas, with a "slight" risk region pushing from southern Arkansas to far-western Mississippi. The Day 1 Convective Outlook the following day, on December 26, saw the "enhanced" risk be retracted but a "slight" risk be outlined for much of Louisiana, outlined by a 5% tornado risk.

=== December 28 ===
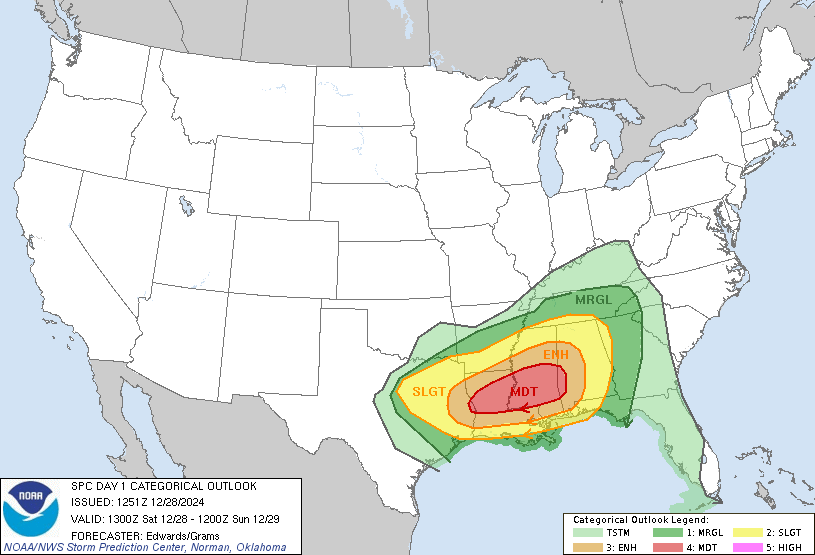
The day 1 convective outlook for December 28, issued by Nathan Wendt at the Storm Prediction Center

A "moderate", level 4-of-5 risk was issued by the Storm Prediction Center for December 28, as a shortwave trough was expected to move through Texas and Louisiana, with the risk area also extending into Mississippi and extreme south bringing the expectation of large hail and multiple tornadoes, some being strong (EF2+). Several factors, led to developing convection, including rich Gulf moisture bringing dewpoints ranging from 60–70 °F (16–21 °C), and strengthening low-level jet (LLJ) with large-scale ascent ahead of the approaching surface low that was expected to provide the necessary lift for convection.

Additionally, destabilization caused by sufficient daytime heating led to lead to high levels of atmospheric instability with convective available potential energy (CAPE) expected to range around 1500–2000 j/kg. Both a bowing quasi-linear convective system and discrete supercells were expected to form in the risk area. A high risk had been considered for central Louisiana into central Mississippi, but local National Weather Service offices advised against it. As the evening progressed, it was expected to shift into a powerful squall line with the potential to cause intense downburst wind damage in addition to embedded tornadic mesocyclones.

== Confirmed tornadoes ==
Confirmed tornadoes by Enhanced Fujita rating
EFU	EF0	EF1	EF2	EF3	EF4	EF5	Total
1	39	63	3	3	0	0	110

=== December 28 event ===
List of confirmed tornadoes – Saturday, December 28, 2024 (Note: All dates are based on the local time zone where the tornado touched down; however, all times are in Coordinated Universal Time for consistency.)
EF#	Location	County / Parish	State	Start Coord.	Time (UTC)	Path length	Max width
EF1	N of Oretta	Beauregard	LA	30.5622°N 93.4394°W	14:22–14:28	1.54 mi (2.48 km)	100 yd (91 m)
EF1	A tornado snapped trees.						
EF1	NE of Brookshire to N of Katy	Waller, Harris	TX	29.8176°N 95.9242°W	16:30–16:55	10.91 mi (17.56 km)	150 yd (140 m)
EF1	Several homes were damaged.						
EF3	Porter Heights to WNW of Splendora	Montgomery	TX	30.1505°N 95.3288°W	18:05–18:30	10.34 mi (16.64 km)	1,675 yd (1,532 m)
EF3	This large, intense tornado reached EF3 intensity almost immediately after touching down and destroyed two homes with roofs removed and most of their exterior walls knocked down. Some people were trapped in one of the homes but walked away uninjured. Several homes and mobile homes were heavily damaged or destroyed along the rest of the path and many trees were snapped or uprooted as well. Ten people were injured.						
EF2	WNW of Liverpool to southern Hillcrest	Brazoria	TX	29.33°N 95.3373°W	18:53–19:12	8.78 mi (14.13 km)	300 yd (270 m)
EF2	1 death – This tornado initially heavily damaged or destroyed outbuildings, mobile homes, and warehouses with a fatality occurring in a mobile home that was obliterated. Homes suffered roof damage, a small plane was thrown, a vehicle was flipped into a home, trees were snapped or uprooted, and power poles were damaged. After crossing SH 35 and FM 2403, the tornado strengthened to its peak intensity as it passed south of Hillcrest and struck an elementary school at EF2 strength. The school was severely damaged with most of its roof being torn off and multiple exterior walls being damaged or knocked down. The tornado then severely damaged another home and an outbuilding before dissipating. Four people were injured.						
EF1	Eastern Dickinson to Western San Leon	Galveston	TX	29.45°N 95.06°W	19:37–19:54	7.40 mi (11.91 km)	850 yd (780 m)
EF1	This tornado passed just southeast of Dickinson, causing mainly minor damage to homes and mobile homes, uprooting trees, snapping tree branches. A small area of EF1 damage occurred on the eastern side of town where homes had severe roof damage and fences were blown over. The tornado then passed west of San Leon, inflicting minor roof damage to homes, blowing over power poles, and destroying a small trailer before moving out over the Galveston Bay.						
EF3	S of Oak Island, TX to S of Port Arthur, TX to eastern Sabine National Wildlife Refuge	Chambers (TX), Jefferson (TX), Cameron (LA)	TX, LA	29.609°N 94.6904°W	20:35–22:33	68.42 mi (110.11 km)	880 yd (800 m)
EF3	This tornado touched down on the east coast of the Galveston Bay and tracked through rural Chambers County, snapping wooden power lines and destroying a mobile home. Two steel transmission lines were blown down and a pickup truck was tossed, injuring the driver. The tornado entered Jefferson County and tracked through the northern portions of McFaddin National Wildlife Refuge, where high-end EF3 damage was inflicted to two large single-story buildings that were almost completely destroyed. Other buildings nearby had their roofs removed and demolished. One car containing 2 individuals was flipped, injuring one of the two occupants. The tornado then passed just south of Port Arthur, entering Sabine Lake as a large waterspout before crossing into Louisiana. After moving back onto land, the tornado entered the eastern portions of Sabine National Wildlife Refuge before dissipating after almost two hours on the ground. Two people were injured.						
EF1	NE of Gloster	Amite	MS	31.245°N 90.9605°W	20:56–20:57	0.36 mi (0.58 km)	50 yd (46 m)
EF1	Several pine trees were downed. This tornado likely had a longer path but was inaccessible to survey.						
EF3	S of Bude to SE of McCall Creek to S of Midway	Franklin, Lincoln	MS	31.3773°N 90.8606°W	21:13–21:57	28.29 mi (45.53 km)	1,500 yd (1,400 m)
EF3	This large, intense tornado touched down south of Bude, within the northeastern sections of Homochitto National Forest and moved northeastward, snapping trees. Southeast of the town, the tornado reached low-end EF3 intensity, completely destroying the O'Zion Baptist Church, inflicting severe damage to some homes, and causing widespread tree damage in the area. A mobile home in the area was also rolled on its side, injuring the two occupants. The tornado then continued northeastward, rolling another mobile home and snapping additional trees and a power pole. It then passed just barely southeast of McCall Creek, blowing the roof off of a modular home, damaging or destroying outbuildings, and snapping or uprooting trees. The tornado then crossed US 84 just west of Lucien, and continued northeastward, snapping or uprooting more trees, rolling a small mobile home, and inflicting severe roof damage to another home. Just before crossing into Lincoln County, the tornado reached low-end EF3 intensity again and blew down multiple large transmission towers. After crossing the county line, the tornado caused additional damage to the roofs of homes as well as to power lines and trees before dissipating.						
EF1	SW of New Llano to NNE of Rosepine	Vernon	LA	31.0332°N 93.3392°W	21:20–21:28	6.55 mi (10.54 km)	100 yd (91 m)
EF1	Numerous trees were damaged.						
EF0	S of Leander	Vernon	LA	31.0643°N 92.8474°W	21:25–21:26	0.32 mi (0.51 km)	50 yd (46 m)
EF0	A very brief tornado downed several trees.						
EF0	SSE of New Llano	Vernon	LA	31.0819°N 93.2693°W	21:27–21:32	3.31 mi (5.33 km)	50 yd (46 m)
EF0	This tornado touched down just east of US 171, pulling the roof and metal panels off of an outbuilding. Southeast of the outbuilding, the tornado caused minor roof damage to the shingles of two homes. The tornado snapped pine trees as it moved into western Fort Johnson before dissipating.						
EF1	N of Fullerton	Vernon	LA	31.0204°N 92.9878°W	21:49–21:51	1.2 mi (1.9 km)	50 yd (46 m)
EF1	Several trees were snapped on the southern edge of Fort Johnson.						
EF1	ENE of Delhi to W of Transylvania	Madison, East Carroll	LA	32.4768°N 91.4357°W	22:15–22:38	16.2 mi (26.1 km)	280 yd (260 m)
EF1	A tornado damaged the roof of a house, peeled the roof off an outbuilding and snapped several trees before moving over open fields. As it tracked through the fields, a few trees were downed, large tree limbs were snapped and minor damage occurred to outbuildings. The tornado then began damage to the exterior of homes, including pushing a mobile home off its foundation before lifting.						
EF1	E of Warden to ENE of Epps	Richland, West Carroll	LA	32.5357°N 91.4892°W	22:19–22:26	5.7 mi (9.2 km)	130 yd (120 m)
EF1	This tornado touched down at a golf club north of Poverty Point Reservoir State Park, downing large tree limbs, partially blowing out a garage wall, and displacing outdoor furniture.						
EF1	ESE of Delhi	Madison	LA	32.4207°N 91.4017°W	22:25–22:28	1.9 mi (3.1 km)	200 yd (180 m)
EF1	A tornado crossed I-20 and US 80, snapping and uprooting trees.						
EF1	S of Transylvania, LA to NNE of Fitler, MS	East Carroll (LA), Issaquena (MS)	LA, MS	32.6157°N 91.1955°W	22:49–23:10	15.4 mi (24.8 km)	300 yd (270 m)
EF1	A low-end EF1 tornado downed large hardwood limbs, which blocked railroad tracks along US 65. One house sustained significant shingle loss, but structural damage was minimal. The tornado then crossed the Mississippi River into Mississippi, where it destroyed a shed, damaged a carport, and shifted a mobile home off its foundation. The tornado continued to break branches and snap small trees before dissipating.						
EF1	E of Bayou Chicot to NW of Lebeau	Evangeline, St. Landry	LA	30.846°N 92.2572°W	23:06–23:18	15.6 mi (25.1 km)	200 yd (180 m)
EF1	This tornado started in the small community of St. Landry, damaging and snapping some trees. The tornado moved southeast, damaging some power lines near St. Louis. The tornado continued damaging trees before dissipating and crossing US 71.						
EF1	ESE of Ridgecrest	Concordia	LA	31.593°N 91.5123°W	23:12–23:13	0.4 mi (0.64 km)	80 yd (73 m)
EF1	A brief tornado uprooted some trees, broke a fence, snapped large branches, and shifted a shed off its foundation.						
EFU	N of Creole	Cameron	LA	29.9128°N 93.1592°W	23:17–23:28	4.33 mi (6.97 km)	330 yd (300 m)
EFU	A tornado was confirmed via satellite and radar. It caused damage to vegetation, which is not a damage indicator that could be rated.						
EF1	NW of East Lincoln	Lincoln	MS	31.519°N 90.2802°W	23:33–23:50	9.9 mi (15.9 km)	400 yd (370 m)
EF1	A high-end EF1 snapped and uprooted numerous trees throughout its path. A home had its roof and a nearby shed minorly damaged from the tornado as well.						
EF1	NW of Fayette	Jefferson	MS	31.7151°N 91.1949°W	23:37–23:46	8.9 mi (14.3 km)	750 yd (690 m)
EF1	Numerous trees were uprooted or snapped. One tree fell on a power line and several houses had shingle damage.						
EF0	SW of Innis to NNW of Batchelor	Pointe Coupee	LA	30.85°N 91.7°W	23:40–23:44	2.02 mi (3.25 km)	50 yd (46 m)
EF0	Scattered tree damage occurred.						
EF1	ENE of Fort Adams to E of Woodville	Wilkinson	MS	31.14°N 91.42°W	23:42–23:58	11.32 mi (18.22 km)	50 yd (46 m)
EF1	Several hundred trees were damaged.						
EF0	S of Doloroso to SW of Wilkinson	Wilkinson	MS	31.21°N 91.37°W	23:46–23:50	4.65 mi (7.48 km)	25 yd (23 m)
EF0	A high-end EF0 tornado snapped branches and downed a tree. Most of tornado's path was inaccessible to ground surveyors and was extended through the use of high-resolution satellite imagery.						
EF1	N of Pattison	Claiborne	MS	31.88°N 90.97°W	23:54–00:01	5 mi (8.0 km)	300 yd (270 m)
EF1	A manufactured home and a tin carport were shifted, and the home sustained roof damage as well. Many trees were snapped or uprooted.						
EF1	E of Red Lick to WNW of Payton	Jefferson, Claiborne	MS	31.79°N 90.97°W	23:55–00:03	9.2 mi (14.8 km)	400 yd (370 m)
EF1	A portion of a manufactured home's roof was peeled off, and some tin was peeled from another residence as well. Numerous trees were snapped or uprooted.						
EF1	E of Yokena to NW of Cayuga	Warren	MS	32.1623°N 90.8792°W	23:58–00:07	4.6 mi (7.4 km)	500 yd (460 m)
EF1	Numerous trees were snapped and uprooted.						
EF0	NW of Centreville to WSW of Gloster	Wilkinson	MS	31.18°N 91.16°W	00:00–00:06	3.96 mi (6.37 km)	75 yd (69 m)
EF0	An intermittent tornado damaged tree branches and treetops as it moved eastward through densely forested areas. Part of tornado's path was inaccessible to ground surveyors and was extended through the use of high-resolution satellite imagery.						
EF1	ENE of Oldenburg to WNW of Brookhaven	Franklin, Lincoln	MS	31.61°N 90.93°W	00:03–00:27	20.1 mi (32.3 km)	1,055 yd (965 m)
EF1	Numerous trees were snapped or uprooted across a long, wide path. Power poles were snapped as well. This tornado likely crossed the track of the previous EF3 tornado.						
EF0	NNW of Cayuga to SSW of Edwards	Warren, Hinds	MS	32.2378°N 90.7363°W	00:09–00:13	4.2 mi (6.8 km)	250 yd (230 m)
EF0	Several large tree branches were broken and some trees were uprooted. This tornado may have been part of the 2358 UTC tornado.						
EF1	SSW of Edwards to NW of Bolton	Hinds	MS	32.3111°N 90.6164°W	00:18–00:28	9.5 mi (15.3 km)	350 yd (320 m)
EF1	Numerous large tree branches were broken and several trees were snapped and uprooted north and south I-20.						
EF1	W of Pinola	Simpson	MS	31.8343°N 90.0272°W	00:24–00:32	4.33 mi (6.97 km)	350 yd (320 m)
EF1	Trees were snapped and uprooted.						
EF1	NE of Lynchburg to Vernon to S of Scotland	Hinds, Madison	MS	32.4766°N 90.5248°W	00:25–00:48	22.1 mi (35.6 km)	570 yd (520 m)
EF1	This long-track tornado began by snapping and uprooting trees before intensifying and causing extensive tree and a nearby barn also sustained roof damage. It continued northeast, crossing US 49 and causing sporadic home and tree damage in Vernon and Kearney Park before reintensifying and uprooting hardwood trees. The tornado dissipated shortly after exiting the two communities.						
EF1	NE of Satartia	Yazoo	MS	32.7028°N 90.4876°W	00:28–00:30	1.2 mi (1.9 km)	250 yd (230 m)
EF1	Some small branches were broken and a few trees were snapped and uprooted.						
EF1	NW of Brookhaven	Lincoln	MS	31.636°N 90.5517°W	00:33–00:36	3.04 mi (4.89 km)	300 yd (270 m)
EF1	This low-end EF1 tornado uprooted several trees.						
EF1	W of Crystal Springs to ESE of Terry	Copiah, Hinds	MS	31.9915°N 90.4475°W	00:36–00:51	13.06 mi (21.02 km)	1,500 yd (1,400 m)
EF1	This large tornado snapped and uprooted numerous trees, one of which fell onto and damaged a home.						
EF1	Marinsville	Copiah	MS	31.7728°N 90.438°W	00:38–00:43	2.74 mi (4.41 km)	500 yd (460 m)
EF1	This tornado touched down west of I-55 and caused minor tree damage before crossing the interstate into Martinsville. In town, several trees were uprooted with others receiving minor damage before the tornado dissipated.						
EF1	NNW of Gillsburg	Amite	MS	31.0588°N 90.6637°W	00:41–00:42	0.28 mi (0.45 km)	25 yd (23 m)
EF1	A few trees were snapped. This tornado likely had a longer path but was inaccessible to survey.						
EF1	N of Gillsburg to NW of Chatawa	Amite, Pike	MS	31.13°N 90.65°W	00:42–00:53	7.4 mi (11.9 km)	100 yd (91 m)
EF1	This tornado initially caused sporadic swaths of tree damage as it tracked east-southeast. Scattered to widespread tree damage was visible on high-resolution satellite for most of the tornado's path. Drone photos helped to identify a swath of numerous snapped pines which was used to rate the tornado despite the majority of the path being inaccessible and analyzed via high-resolution satellite imagery.						
EF1	SW of Chatawa	Amite, Pike	MS	31.03°N 90.57°W	00:48–00:53	3.77 mi (6.07 km)	—N/a
EF1	Trees were snapped and uprooted.						
EF1	ENE of Sardis to Georgetown to WNW of Union	Copiah, Simpson	MS	31.813°N 90.3093°W	00:49–01:02	12 mi (19 km)	1,232 yd (1,127 m)
EF1	This large tornado touched down just outside of Sardis and moved northeastward, inflicting minor damage to a home and snapping or uprooting dozens of trees. The tornado then moved through Georgetown, snapping or uprooting trees and inflicting minor roof damage to many homes in the town. The tornado then crossed the Pearl River into Simpson County before dissipating shortly afterward.						
EF0	Monticello	East Baton Rogue	LA	30.52°N 91.07°W	00:51–00:55	2.16 mi (3.48 km)	50 yd (46 m)
EF0	This brief, high-end EF0 tornado uprooted trees in residentials areas, causing scattered damage to homes which the trees fell on.						
EF1	E of Bogue Chitto	Lincoln	MS	31.4379°N 90.3669°W	00:53–00:59	2.6 mi (4.2 km)	400 yd (370 m)
EF1	Trees were snapped, one of which caused damage to a shed upon falling.						
EF1	NE of Scotland to SE of Vaughan	Yazoo	MS	32.7362°N 90.1667°W	00:55–01:04	7.4 mi (11.9 km)	800 yd (730 m)
EF1	The tornado began by breaking large branches before intensifying near MS 16, where it uprooted trees, rolled a shed, and damaged a roof. It continued causing extensive tree damage, snapping pines and uprooting hardwoods, while also damaging a carport, shed, and mobile home skirting. The tornado tracked toward I-55, with its path beyond that point remaining uncertain due to inaccessibility. Further surveying is expected.						
EF1	Flowood to Lena to SW of Tuscola	Rankin, Scott, Leake	MS	32.3182°N 90.1046°W	01:04–01:44	38.3 mi (61.6 km)	880 yd (800 m)
EF1	This large, long-tracked QLCS tornado began in a park in Flowood, causing damage to large tree limbs and small trees. The tornado tracked northeast downing dead pine trees just north of Jackson–Medgar Wiley Evers International Airport before entering the Dogwood Festival shopping area, causing minor damage to businesses and downing small trees before strengthening as it moved northeast. Many homes sustained substantial structural damage from fallen trees and large limbs while roofs and sidings suffered lighter impacts. The tornado caused significant damage in neighborhoods near the southern edge of the Ross Barnett Reservoir, downed utility poles at Pelahatchie Creek along MS 25, and removed shingles from homes further east. The tornado damaged sheds, outbuildings, and chicken houses south of Ludlow and caused major damage to a manufactured home along MS 483. The tornado continued into the northern edge of the Bienville National Forest before entering Lena. In Lena, a small antenna at the town's fire department was collapsed and a shed was partially destroyed in town. A few large branches were snapped off of trees east of Lena before the tornado lifted.						
EF1	ESE of New Hebron	Jefferson Davis	MS	31.7213°N 89.9558°W	01:15–01:16	0.2 mi (0.32 km)	200 yd (180 m)
EF1	A brief tornado snapped and uprooted trees in a concentrated area.						
EF1	SW of D'Lo to Mendenhall to NNE of Weathersby	Simpson	MS	31.9382°N 89.9617°W	01:15–01:26	10.7 mi (17.2 km)	800 yd (730 m)
EF1	A tornado began west of Mendenhall, snapping trees and damaging multiple chicken houses before reaching the city. As the tornado entered town, numerous trees and power lines were downed, some falling on homes, while power poles were snapped. A shed was pushed over, roofs were peeled from buildings, and a church's brick façade was blown down. East of the city, the tornado crossed US 49 and continued causing tree and structural damage before lifting.						
EF1	NNE of Mount Olive to SSW of Mize	Smith	MS	31.7929°N 89.6277°W	01:39–01:43	3.4 mi (5.5 km)	200 yd (180 m)
EF1	Large portions of the roof of two chicken houses were removed and numerous trees were snapped and uprooted.						
EF0	NW of Raleigh	Smith	MS	32.0733°N 89.5857°W	01:44–01:45	0.56 mi (0.90 km)	75 yd (69 m)
EF0	A short-lived high-end EF0 tornado downed a few pine trees.						
EF1	W of Shongelo to WNW of Montrose	Smith	MS	32.1046°N 89.5739°W	01:46–01:59	13.18 mi (21.21 km)	700 yd (640 m)
EF1	This tornado tracked through the southern portions of the Bienville National Forest, downing numerous pine trees. Portions of a chicken house were damaged with tin panels strewn along a county road and another shed was mostly destroyed with large branches downed nearby.						
EF0	SSE of Bay Springs	Jasper	MS	31.9274°N 89.2551°W	02:08–02:09	0.99 mi (1.59 km)	50 yd (46 m)
EF0	A high-end EF0 tornado left a narrow corridor of convergently downed pine trees.						
EF0	SSW of Lawrence	Newton	MS	32.2473°N 89.2553°W	02:09–02:10	0.65 mi (1.05 km)	50 yd (46 m)
EF0	A weak tornado occurred in the eastern edge of the Bienville National Forest, damaging a barn and minorly damaging trees.						
EF2	Lake Como to W of Paulding	Jasper	MS	31.9609°N 89.2135°W	02:12–02:22	9.27 mi (14.92 km)	900 yd (820 m)
EF2	This large tornado destroyed multiple chicken houses along a county road with parts of the houses being tossed up to a quarter mile away. Vegetation was damaged, pine trees were snapped, a tree fell onto a mobile home, and a nearby carport was thrown a few dozen yards from its original location. Homes also sustained damage to their roof flashing and gutters along the tornado's path and a shed was damaged near Lake Como as well.						
EF1	SSE of Newton to WSW of Hickory	Newton	MS	32.264°N 89.1469°W	02:19–02:25	4.61 mi (7.42 km)	700 yd (640 m)
EF1	Many trees were uprooted or snapped and several barns and farm outbuildings were damaged.						
EF0	Western Hickory	Newton	MS	32.3164°N 89.0336°W	02:27–02:29	0.49 mi (0.79 km)	165 yd (151 m)
EF0	A few buildings were damaged and minor tree damage occurred.						
EF1	NW of Chunky	Newton	MS	32.3366°N 88.97°W	02:34–02:38	2.58 mi (4.15 km)	650 yd (590 m)
EF1	A home lost its roof, a shed was damaged, and numerous trees were uprooted or damaged.						
EF1	NW of Pachuta to ENE of Enterprise	Jasper, Clarke	MS	32.0931°N 89.9187°W	02:36–02:49	12 mi (19 km)	500 yd (460 m)
EF1	This low-end EF1 touched down in the small community of Orange, uplifting the tin roof of a shed and causing minor damage to trees. The tornado caused minor tree damage as it moved northeast crossing I-59. Just south of Enterprise, the tornado uprooted large trees and snapped large branches before lifting just east of the town.						
EF1	Eastern Lacombe	St. Tammany	LA	30.3°N 89.8976°W	02:47–02:51	1.15 mi (1.85 km)	50 yd (46 m)
EF1	This low-end EF1 tornado immediately snapped trees and caused significant damage to a mobile home as soon as it touched down. The mobile home suffered partial roof failure, broken windows, and was shifted off its foundation. Debris from the roof of the mobile home was thrown over 100 yd (91 m). The tornado continued eastward, snapping some more trees in yards and wooded areas before dissipating.						
EF1	E of Clayton Village	Oktibbeha	MS	33.4638°N 88.7488°W	02:49–02:51	2.1 mi (3.4 km)	300 yd (270 m)
EF1	A high-end EF1 tornado touched down in a neighborhood just outside of Starkville, damaging the roofs of several townhomes. Tree damage was also noted by the townhomes. Further along the tornado's path, it snapped power poles and trees and damaged several more roofs. The tornado dissipated after crossing US 82.						
EF1	N of Quitman	Clarke	MS	32.0402°N 88.7347°W	02:53–02:55	2.4 mi (3.9 km)	400 yd (370 m)
EF1	Numerous trees and a power pole were snapped. One tree fell onto a home. A garage door was blown in. A shed was destroyed.						
EF1	ENE of Enterprise	Clarke	MS	32.2086°N 88.6954°W	02:55	0.4 mi (0.64 km)	80 yd (73 m)
EF1	Several trees were uprooted and minor damage to siding and shingles occurred.						
EF0	E of Tibbee to WNW of Waverly	Clay	MS	33.5221°N 88.5789°W	02:59–03:03	4.7 mi (7.6 km)	200 yd (180 m)
EF0	A high-end EF0 tornado began just north of the Lowndes-Clay County line, snapping several trees. The tornado tracked northeast, damaging the roof of a mobile home and a porch, uprooting trees, and blowing down a fence. Tree damage continued to occur until the tornado dissipated.						
EF1	SE of Meridian Station	Lauderdale	MS	32.4902°N 88.6365°W	03:01–03:11	9.21 mi (14.82 km)	630 yd (580 m)
EF1	A tornado moved through the Meridian Naval Air Station, damaging several buildings, one of which suffered extensive roof damage, partial collapse of the brick veneer, broken windows, and subsequent interior water damage. The fire station doors were blown in and some vehicles were damaged. Some trees were uprooted and snapped in and around the air station.						
EF1	SW of Increase to S of Alamucha	Lauderdale	MS	32.2418°N 88.6134°W	03:01–03:14	10.3 mi (16.6 km)	700 yd (640 m)
EF1	Several trees were uprooted and multiple large branches were snapped.						
EF1	NE of Quitman	Clarke	MS	32.0914°N 88.6174°W	03:03–03:12	8.8 mi (14.2 km)	450 yd (410 m)
EF1	Numerous trees were snapped or uprooted; one fell onto a home. A shed sustained roof damage.						
EF1	W of Vernon	Lamar	AL	33.71°N 88.21°W	03:27–03:32	5.07 mi (8.16 km)	300 yd (270 m)
EF1	A home lost its roof and dozens of trees were snapped and uprooted.						
EF2	SE of Winchester	Wayne	MS	31.5803°N 88.5904°W	03:33–03:39	4.38 mi (7.05 km)	500 yd (460 m)
EF2	This low-end EF2 tornado touched down and damaged several greenhouses at a nursery and snapped or uprooted trees nearby. The tornado intensified as it moved east-northeast, completely rolling a manufactured home off its foundation, injuring four people, and inflicting significant tree and roof damage in the same area. Numerous large trees were snapped, and several vehicles were destroyed by falling debris. The tornado continued across US 45, damaging a church and several long chicken houses, with roofs peeled off and one of the chicken houses partially destroyed. Additional tree and roof damage occurred along rural roads before the tornado dissipated in an inaccessible forested area near Buckatunna Creek. Future adjustments to the track may refine its extent due to limited access for surveys.						
EF0	NW of Sulligent	Lamar	AL	33.9441°N 88.2174°W	03:40–03:41	1.45 mi (2.33 km)	100 yd (91 m)
EF0	Tree limbs were downed and several trees were snapped and uprooted.						
EF0	N of Beaverton	Lamar	AL	33.9421°N 88.0175°W	03:45–03:47	1.63 mi (2.62 km)	150 yd (140 m)
EF0	A house had its shingles damaged and a cluster of trees were snapped and uprooted.						
EF0	NE of Brilliant	Marion	AL	34.0598°N 87.7171°W	04:05–04:07	2.09 mi (3.36 km)	150 yd (140 m)
EF0	This tornado initially snapped a power pole and removed the roof covering off of a manufactured home. Moving northeastward, a few trees were uprooted, another home sustained shingle loss, and a trampoline was tossed into the woods. The tornado then produced significant tree damage for a short period before lifting.						
EF1	NE of Forkland to Sawyerville to SSW of Havana	Greene, Hale	AL	32.6733°N 87.819°W	04:13–04:32	14.77 mi (23.77 km)	1,760 yd (1,610 m)
EF1	This very large tornado began northeast of Forkland, uprooting large hardwood trees that damaged a home and vehicle, while also tearing metal panels from a farm outbuilding. A well-defined area of significant tree damage followed, with dozens to hundreds of pine trees snapped, suggesting multiple vortices. As the tornado widened to nearly a mile, it destroyed a hay barn, damaged homes, and snapped trees. The tornado then turned northward through Sawyerville, causing only minor damage before intensifying again with sporadic tree damage along its path before eventually dissipating north-northeast of town. No tornado warning was ever issued for this tornado.						
EF1	NW of Foshee	Escambia	AL	31.1936°N 87.3245°W	04:13–04:15	2.36 mi (3.80 km)	50 yd (46 m)
EF1	This tornado touched down just north of I-65, leaning several trees and snapping some small tree branches. The tornado continued damaging trees, snapping and uprooting them. The tornado began to occlude, where it impacted some small cabins, snapped multiple trees, and destroyed most of a tree stand.						
EF1	SW of Range	Conecuh	AL	31.28°N 87.27°W	04:22–04:25	1.38 mi (2.22 km)	120 yd (110 m)
EF1	A tornado remained completely within forests, uprooting trees and breaking tree branches.						
EF0	N of Range to ENE of Repton	Conecuh	AL	31.3463°N 87.2387°W	04:30–04:40	5.19 mi (8.35 km)	30 yd (27 m)
EF0	A high-end EF0 tornado damaged several trees.						
EF1	Burnt Corn	Monroe, Conecuh	AL	31.5239°N 87.1659°W	04:55–05:01	2.84 mi (4.57 km)	150 yd (140 m)
EF1	A few trees were uprooted and a Baptist church was shifted slightly off its foundation.						
EF1	NE of Loree to W of Lyeffion	Conecuh	AL	31.5°N 87.05°W	05:04–05:18	7.31 mi (11.76 km)	700 yd (640 m)
EF1	A trailer was tossed, three log cabins had their metal roofs peeled back, a chapel was shifted off its foundation, and hundreds of trees were snapped or uprooted.						
EF1	Athens	Limestone	AL	34.7753°N 86.9782°W	05:15–05:20	3.87 mi (6.23 km)	160 yd (150 m)
EF1	This damaging EF1 tornado began in southern Athens, snapping tree branches and uprooting several trees as it moved northward. The tornado caused its first significant building damage at a restaurant near US 72, where part of the roof was blown off and debris scattered across the area. It strengthened as it entered downtown Athens, snapping power poles and uprooting trees, with the most notable damage occurring around the square near the Limestone County courthouse. Multiple buildings in the area lost portions of their roofs, including a bookstore whose roof was completely torn off, and debris was scattered blocks away. A historic oak tree by the courthouse was uprooted and major damage occurred at Veterans Memorial Park where fencing was downed and a helicopter display was hurled approximately 60 ft (18 m). The tornado then reached peak intensity as it impacted an old warehouse, completely destroying it due to poor structural anchoring. Additional roof damage was noted along CSX's S&NA North Subdivision as the tornado exited downtown, with sporadic tree damage observed until it dissipated. No tornado warning was issued for this tornado.						
EF1	W of Providence	Butler	AL	31.69°N 86.89°W	05:29–05:38	4.98 mi (8.01 km)	800 yd (730 m)
EF1	A high-end EF1 tornado snapped and uprooted numerous trees throughout its path.						
EF0	E of Thorsby to SE of Jumbo	Chilton	AL	32.9193°N 86.6622°W	05:57–06:05	6.01 mi (9.67 km)	150 yd (140 m)
EF0	This weak tornado tore a few metal roof panels off of a barndominium and did minor damage to trees.						
EF0	S of Belle Fontaine	Mobile	AL	30.4315°N 88.107°W	05:59–06:00	0.16 mi (0.26 km)	30 yd (27 m)
EF0	This tornado pulled a home's back patio wall down, tossing it and the contents of the patio south of the home. Large tree limbs were knocked down, outdoor furniture was thrown, and minor cosmetic damage occurred to piers. A fence was blown over before the tornado moved offshore into Mobile Bay.						

=== December 29 event ===
List of confirmed tornadoes – Sunday, December 29, 2024
EF#	Location	County / Parish	State	Start Coord.	Time (UTC)	Path length	Max width
EF1	NW of Harpersville	Shelby	AL	33.3551°N 86.4716°W	06:11–06:14	1.53 mi (2.46 km)	175 yd (160 m)
EF1	A horse farm had four buildings on its property damaged and several trees were uprooted, some of which had their large branches snapped.						
EF0	SE of Mount Willing	Lowndes	AL	32.0121°N 86.6604°W	06:15–06:18	1.71 mi (2.75 km)	100 yd (91 m)
EF0	This high-end EF0 tornado damaged a few structures, including rolling a mobile home onto its roof and another with minor roof damage. A large shed lost roof panels and some power lines were downed. Numerous trees were also downed with limbs broken and uprooted trunks along with smaller trees that were snapped.						
EF0	ESE of New London	St. Clair	AL	33.4609°N 86.3355°W	06:25–06:28	2.26 mi (3.64 km)	150 yd (140 m)
EF0	A high-end EF0 tornado tracked along the south shore of Logan Martin Lake, snapping or uprooting numerous trees, many of which fell onto homes along the lake.						
EF1	WSW of Pell City	St. Clair	AL	33.5678°N 86.3477°W	06:30–06:33	1.52 mi (2.45 km)	325 yd (297 m)
EF1	A chicken farm had five structures damaged with debris from the farm being thrown at least 300 yd (270 m) downstream. Multiple trees were snapped or uprooted along the path as well.						
EF0	NW of Pintlala	Lowndes, Montgomery	AL	32.2233°N 86.4239°W	06:39–06:41	1.17 mi (1.88 km)	100 yd (91 m)
EF0	Several cedar trees had their limbs snapped and numerous other trees were uprooted or downed. Solar panels were blown off a house and siding was removed from a nearby outbuilding. The tornado briefly crossed into Montgomery County, removing most of a small barn's roof and flipping a wooden playground set as the tornado lifted.						
EF1	Northeastern Hope Hull	Montgomery	AL	32.2615°N 86.3715°W	06:43–06:48	3.94 mi (6.34 km)	250 yd (230 m)
EF1	This tornado began just west of I-65 and quickly crossed it, causing roof and siding damage to warehouses, flipping semi-trailers, and collapsing a cinderblock wall. The tornado scattered the debris across the interstate and damaged businesses, including Hooper Academy, near US 31 and I-65 interchange. Moving east-northeast, the tornado uprooted trees, stripped a greenhouse-style building of its covering, and caused roof damage to a house, shed, and small metal building before dissipating west of US 331.						
EF1	NNE of Summerdale	Baldwin	AL	30.5001°N 87.6923°W	06:47–06:50	2.38 mi (3.83 km)	50 yd (46 m)
EF1	A tornado initially touched down near a home and significantly damaged the roof, destroyed the home's patio, and destroyed a shed roof near the home along with downing large tree branches and fencing. At an RV park, an RV was overturned, some outdoor items were displaced, and minor tree damage occurred. At a nearby mobile home community, skirting was torn from homes and loose items like furniture and toys were scattered. The tornado intensified again further northeast, damaging a metal outbuilding by removing and twisting roofing and support beams, launching debris and overturning a small tractor. The tornado lifted shortly after damaging the outbuilding.						
EF1	NE of Ada to SW of Mathews	Montgomery	AL	32.1316°N 86.2238°W	06:53–07:05	10.01 mi (16.11 km)	500 yd (460 m)
EF1	A tornado initially caused minor tree damage with one pine tree falling on a home. Numerous other trees were snapped or uprooted and a double-wide trailer and nearby sheds also sustained damage. Tree damage continued across wooded areas and pastures before the tornado reached US 231, where a business lost part of its roof and many pine tree were snapped or uprooted. Additional tree and outbuilding damage continued until the tornado dissipated.						
EF0	N of Mathews	Montgomery	AL	32.283°N 86.0376°W	07:11–07:13	2.5 mi (4.0 km)	100 yd (91 m)
EF0	A tornado caused convergent tree damage, snapping and uprooting trees, and partially removing a garage roof. The damage continued eastward, affecting wooded areas and structures before dissipating.						
EF0	Western Shorter	Macon	AL	32.3852°N 85.9811°W	07:18–07:21	1.86 mi (2.99 km)	175 yd (160 m)
EF0	Several trees and tree limbs were downed or snapped.						
EF0	S of Shorter to ESE of Milstead	Macon	AL	32.3759°N 85.9362°W	07:18–07:27	5.55 mi (8.93 km)	200 yd (180 m)
EF0	A tornado uprooted trees and snapped limbs near homes and a church as it crossed US 80, causing its most significant damage near a school. The damage diminished further east, with smaller trees and limbs downed before the tornado dissipated.						
EF0	NW of Franklin	Macon	AL	32.4729°N 85.8696°W	07:30–07:32	2.17 mi (3.49 km)	75 yd (69 m)
EF0	Several trees were snapped and uprooted in a densely wooded area.						
EF0	NNE of Franklin	Macon	AL	32.4839°N 85.7918°W	07:31–07:32	0.76 mi (1.22 km)	50 yd (46 m)
EF0	A few small trees and tree limbs were downed.						
EF1	Durand to Harris City to ESE of Haralson	Meriwether	GA	32.9168°N 84.7633°W	08:54–09:20	24.62 mi (39.62 km)	200 yd (180 m)
EF1	A long-tracked EF1 tornado traversed most of central Meriwether County, snapping and uprooting thousands of trees throughout its path. One large tree fell on an unoccupied home, completely destroying it, and a manufactured home had its metal roofing blown off.						
EF1	NNE of Campbellton	Douglas	GA	33.6959°N 84.6465°W	09:15–09:16	0.25 mi (0.40 km)	100 yd (91 m)
EF1	This brief tornado downed several trees that fell onto and severely damaged multiple homes. A resident of one of the homes was injured.						
EF0	E of Haralson to SE of Senoia	Meriwether, Coweta	GA	33.2174°N 84.5236°W	09:22–09:26	3.2 mi (5.1 km)	100 yd (91 m)
EF0	This high-end EF0 downed hundreds of trees on both sides of the Meriwether-Coweta county line.						
EF0	E of Starr's Mill to SW of Woolsey	Fayette	GA	33.3379°N 84.4562°W	09:38–09:41	1.58 mi (2.54 km)	100 yd (91 m)
EF0	A few trees were downed and numerous large tree branches were snapped.						
EF1	SE of Noonday	Cobb	GA	34.0332°N 84.4893°W	09:40–09:41	0.26 mi (0.42 km)	
EF1	A brief tornado damaged approximately a dozen homes due to downing large trees on top of them. One home was nearly destroyed by a large pine tree, injuring two people.						
EF0	Western Dunwoody	DeKalb	GA	33.9398°N 84.3353°W	09:46–09:47	0.51 mi (0.82 km)	
EF0	This high-end EF0 tornado damaged an apartment unit, partially ripping the roof off. Approximately ten homes were damaged and roughly 50 to 100 trees and several power poles were snapped or uprooted, falling onto several homes, two of which had significant damage.						
EF0	SSE of Gowensville	Spartanburg	SC	35.0304°N 82.2151°W	12:55–12:57	1.72 mi (2.77 km)	30 yd (27 m)
EF0	Multiple trees were uprooted and large tree limbs were snapped.						
EF0	ENE of Mill Spring	Polk	NC	35.3059°N 82.1215°W	13:13–13:14	0.89 mi (1.43 km)	75 yd (69 m)
EF0	An EF0 tornado briefly touched down east of Mill Spring, uprooting dozens of trees before dissipating.						
EF0	NE of Cross Anchor	Union	SC	34.662°N 81.824°W	13:15–13:19	2.24 mi (3.60 km)	30 yd (27 m)
EF0	Several large tree limbs were snapped and trees were uprooted.						
EF0	ESE of Monarch Mills	Union	SC	34.7102°N 81.5533°W	13:27–13:36	6.99 mi (11.25 km)	50 yd (46 m)
EF0	Several large tree limbs were snapped and trees were uprooted and downed.						
EF0	WNW of Buffalo	Union	SC	34.7606°N 81.7538°W	13:28–13:31	1.74 mi (2.80 km)	25 yd (23 m)
EF0	Numerous large tree limbs were snapped and trees were uprooted and downed.						
EF0	E of Chapin to SSW of Winnsboro Mills	Richland, Fairfield	SC	34.1534°N 81.3024°W	13:35–13:49	11.2 mi (18.0 km)	150 yd (140 m)
EF0	This weak but long-lived tornado damaged several trees.						
EF0	S of Winnsboro Mills	Fairfield	SC	34.284°N 81.1391°W	13:52–13:57	3.72 mi (5.99 km)	200 yd (180 m)
EF0	Minor shingle damage occurred to homes, a few large tree limbs were snapped, and a tree was uprooted.						
EF1	SE of Winnsboro Mills	Fairfield	SC	34.3339°N 81.088°W	13:56–14:04	4.89 mi (7.87 km)	250 yd (230 m)
EF1	A tornado began just north of a manufacturing plant to the west of US 321, overturning four empty trailers and snapping multiple utility poles. The tornado crossed the highway, collapsed a large garage door on the east side of a food plant, and snapped numerous trees nearby. Several more trees and power poles were snapped as the tornado tracked east and dissipated.						
EF0	Bethany	York	SC	35.1125°N 81.3056°W	14:09–14:13	3.24 mi (5.21 km)	50 yd (46 m)
EF0	Several trees were uprooted and tree limbs were snapped.						
EF0	Belmont	Mecklenburg	NC	35.2013°N 80.9734°W	14:22–14:23	1.55 mi (2.49 km)	20 yd (18 m)
EF0	A tree was downed and several large tree limbs were snapped.						
EF0	SW of Marysville	Union	OH	40.2158°N 83.4027°W	20:08–20:09	0.35 mi (0.56 km)	50 yd (46 m)
EF0	A weak tornado toppled a small silo, damaged several trees, and caused minor damage to an older barn and a few roof shingles. Another large metal barn had its roof damaged and a partial collapse of its walls.						

== Aftermath ==
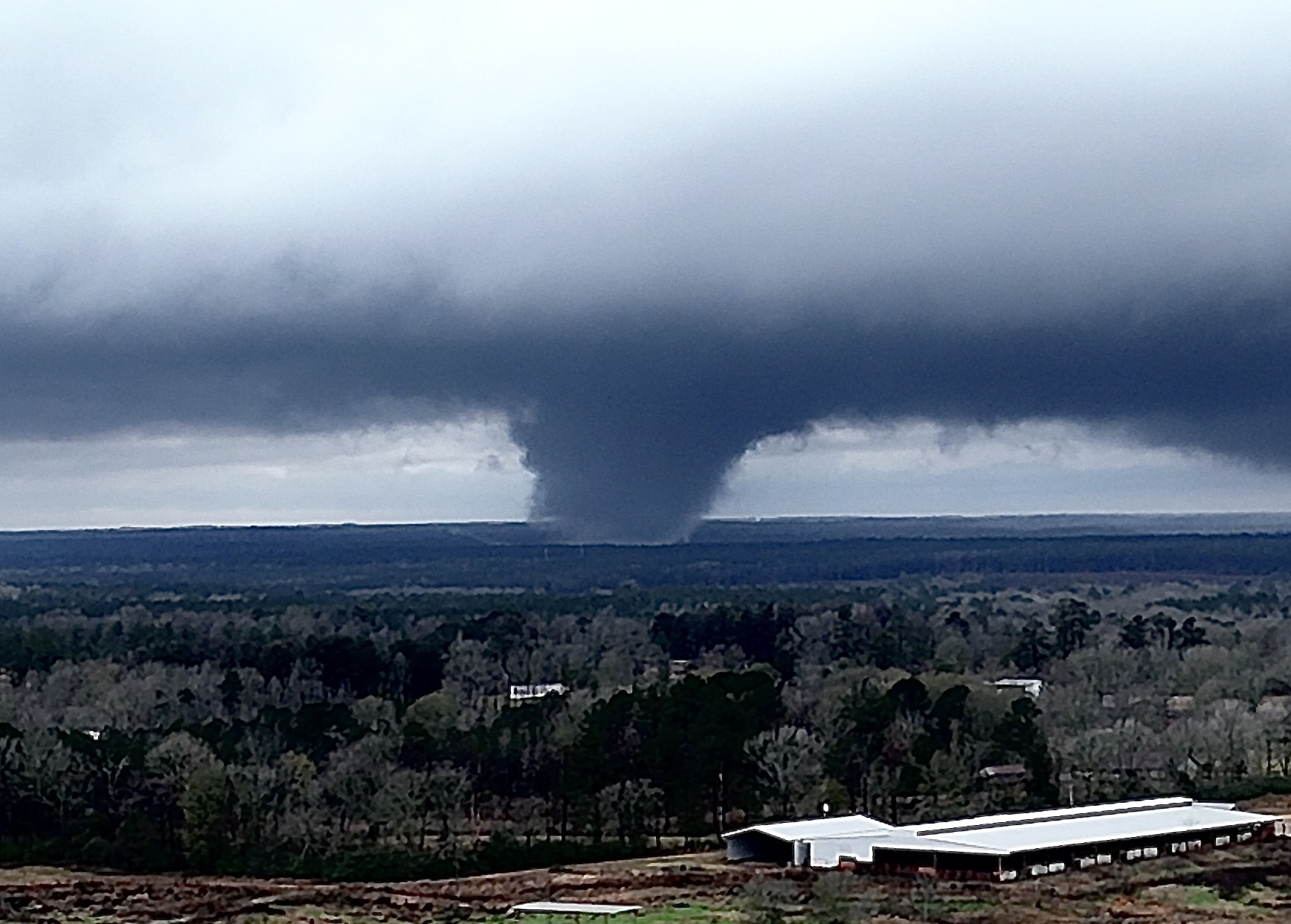
The EF3 Bude, Mississippi tornado as seen from a drone.

=== Casualties ===
As a result of the event, four people were confirmed dead. The only tornado-related death occurred in Brazoria County, Texas as an EF2-rated tornado moved through the area. Additionally, at least six people were injured across the affected areas.

=== Damage ===
In Liverpool, emergency officials reported that several homes were completely destroyed. Porter Heights saw significant damage, with at least five homes heavily impacted. In Waller, Texas, a mobile home park was upended, with flipped cars and extensive damage reported. Damage and injuries were reported near Bude, a rural community about 60 miles southwest of Jackson. Photos and videos showed piles of debris from what appeared to be at least one destroyed home. A high-end EF1 struck downtown Athens, Alabama causing lots of damage to businesses and structures in the city with multiple buildings having walls collapse or roofs destroyed.

Over 45,000 power outages were recorded in Texas and about 21,000 in Louisiana. In Georgia, approximately 11,900 customers lost power due to the storms. In Franklin County, Mississippi, more than 30% of all utility customers lost power. The storm system disrupted an estimated 5,000 flights and resulted in the cancellation of 700 others.

The Memphis Police Department issued a warning about flooded roads on December 28, and shut down portions of I-55 as well. In Millington, Tennessee, six people required rescue from flooded vehicles.

== See also ==
- List of North American tornadoes and tornado outbreaks
- List of United States tornadoes from November to December 2024
- Tornado outbreak of December 16–17, 2019 – a tornado outbreak five years earlier with a similar setup
- 2023 Pasadena–Deer Park tornado – another long-track tornado event in the Houston area
- Tornado outbreak of November 2–5, 2024 – another late-season tornado outbreak the month prior
