= Mississippi Highway 503 =

State highway in Mississippi

Mississippi Highway 503

Route information
- Maintained by MDOT and Jasper County
- Length: 40.711 mi (65.518 km)
- Existed: 1950–present

Major junctions
- South end: MS 528 near Heidelberg
- US 80 in Hickory; I-20 near Hickory
- North end: MS 15 in Decatur

Location
- Country: United States
- State: Mississippi
- Counties: Jasper, Newton

Highway system
- Mississippi State Highway System; Interstate; US; State
← MS 502	→ MS 504

Mississippi Highway 503 (MS 503) is a 41-mile-long (66 km) state highway in eastern Mississippi running from MS 528 near its junction with Interstate 59 (I-59) outside of Heidelberg to MS 15 in Decatur. The highway has been in existence since 1951 and became designated MS 503 by 1955.

== Route description ==
MS 503 begins in rural Jasper County at MS 528. This point is located about 0.85 miles (1.37 km) north of MS 528's interchange with I-59 (exit 113) and about three miles (4.8 km) northwest of downtown Heidelberg. The two-lane highway generally heads north through wooded areas passing a few residences and some small settlements. About six and a half miles (10.5 km) into its trip, state maintenance of MS 503 ends and county maintenance occurs for the next 1.99 miles (3.20 km). The road ascends and descends small hills until it reaches the community of Paulding, one of two county seats of Jasper County. Some houses, churches, a post office, and a government building surround the community's center intersection at MS 503 and County Road 16 (CR 16). In Paulding, MS 503 briefly curves to the southwest before reaching the aforementioned intersection. Here, MS 503 turns north resuming state maintenance and its course through wooded lands. At MS 18, MS 503 has a short 240-foot-long (73 m) concurrency with MS 18 adjacent to an electrical substation before continuing north.

As MS 503 heads north, the highway continues on a trek through wooded areas with some houses along the road. At the settlement of Hero, it intersects MS 504 at its eastern terminus. Soon after, MS 503 crosses into Newton County. After traveling for seven miles (11 km) in Newton County, the highway enters the town of Hickory. The road enters the town on Jefferson Street, crosses a railroad, and passes by a few businesses. At U.S. Route 80 (US 80), MS 503 heads west along US 80 for one block before turning off the concurrency on Jackson Street. The state highway heads north-northwest out of town towards I-20. The highway interchanges I-20 at its exit 115, a diamond interchange. Nearing its end, MS 503 heads northwest approaching Decatur. Before entering the town, the highway passes a golf course and Newton County High School. The highway enters the town south of its central business district and is only surrounded by residences. It comes to an end at MS 15 at a simple T-intersection.

== History ==
The state highway that traveled along MS 503's current alignment was created in 1951, but was an unnumbered unpaved road. By 1955, MS 503 was formally designated along most of its current alignment, but with a change in Jasper County. The segment from MS 528 and MS 18 was the same, however, another segment was designated between Rose Hill at MS 18 and Hero before resuming its northerly course towards Hickory and Decatur. The portion of current MS 503 between MS 18 and Hero was not designated a state highway at this time. Later, this portion of current MS 503 had been designated MS 507. By 1965, MS 503 and MS 507 had swapped alignments with MS 503 following a direct route from MS 18 to Hero and MS 507 following a road heading northwest from Rose Hill. The highway has followed this alignment since then.

== Major intersections ==
County	Location	mi	km	Destinations	Notes
Jasper		0.000	0.000	MS 528 – Heidelberg, Bay Springs	Southern terminus
Jasper		14.935– 14.980	24.036– 24.108	MS 18 – Bay Springs, Rose Hill	0.045-mile-long (72 m) concurrency with MS 18
Jasper	Hero	22.677	36.495	MS 504 west / CR 24 – Newton, Fellowship	Eastern terminus of MS 504
Newton	Hickory	30.735	49.463	US 80 east – Chunky	Southern end of US 80 concurrency
Newton	Hickory	30.793	49.557	US 80 west / Jackson Street – Newton	Northern end of US 80 concurrency
Newton		32.946– 33.064	53.021– 53.211	I-20 – Meridian, Jackson	Exit 115 (I-20)
Newton	Decatur	40.711	65.518	MS 15 – Newton, Union, East Central Community College	Northern terminus
1.000 mi = 1.609 km; 1.000 km = 0.621 mi: Concurrency terminus
