= Mississippi Highway 504 =

Highway in Mississippi, United States

Mississippi Highway 504
- MS 504 highlighted in pink

Route information
- Maintained by MDOT
- Length: 6.434 mi (10.355 km)
- Existed: c. 1956–present

Major junctions
- West end: MS 15 near Newton
- East end: MS 503 near Hero

Location
- Country: United States
- State: Mississippi
- Counties: Newton, Jasper

Highway system
- Mississippi State Highway System; Interstate; US; State
← MS 503	→ MS 505

Mississippi Highway 504 (MS 504) is a state highway in central Mississippi. The route starts at MS 15 south of Newton and travels southeastward. The road turns east at a county road near Garlandville and travels to its eastern terminus at MS 503 in the unincorporated area of Hero. The route was designated around 1956, from MS 15 to MS 503, and has not changed significantly since.

== Route description ==
The route is located in southern Newton and northern Jasper counties. In 2017, the Mississippi Department of Transportation (MDOT) calculated as many as 670 vehicles traveling on MS 504 east of County Road 5044 (CO 5044), and as few as 650 vehicles traveling southeast of Boutwell Road. This is expressed in terms of annual average daily traffic (AADT), a measure of traffic volume for any average day of the year. MS 504 is legally defined in Mississippi Code § 65-3-3, and all of it is maintained by the Mississippi Department of Transportation (MDOT), as part of the Mississippi State Highway System.

MS 504 starts at the three-way junction with MS 15 in Newton County south of the city of Newton. The route begins travelling southeastward, intersecting Boutwell Road, and entering an area of farmland. The road enters a forested area at Nicholson Road and enters Jasper County past the intersection. The road continues southward until it reaches a T-intersection with County Road 24 (CO 24) near Garlandville. MS 504 turns east and begins travelling towards the Jasper–Newton county line. At CO 5044, the route begins travelling southeastward towards its eastern terminus at MS 503 in Hero. The road continues as CO 24, which continues to MS 513.

== History ==
Around 1956, MS 504 was designated along a paved road from MS 15 to MS 503. Since then, the route has not changed significantly since. In 1995, a project to seal MS 504's pavement from MS 15 to the Newton–Jasper county line began.

== Major intersections ==
County	Location	mi	km	Destinations	Notes
Newton		0.000	0.000	MS 15 – Bay Springs, Newton	Western terminus
Jasper	Hero	6.434	10.355	MS 503 / CR 24 – Hickory, Paulding	Eastern terminus
1.000 mi = 1.609 km; 1.000 km = 0.621 mi
