= Heidelberg High School (Mississippi) =

Public school in Heidelberg, Mississippi

Location
- 804 North Pine Ave. Heidelberg, Mississippi 39439; United States
- 31°53′44″N 88°59′27″W

Information
- School type: Public
- Established: c. 1911
- School district: East Jasper Consolidated School District
- NCES District ID: 2801380
- Superintendent: Nadene Arrington
- NCES School ID: 280138000204
- Principal: Kimberly Dawkins
- Grades: 9-12
- Enrollment: 229
- Student to teacher ratio: 11.43
- Colors: Blue, Gold
- Athletics conference: MHSAA Class 2A
- Mascot: Oilers
- Website: https://www.eastjasper.k12.ms.us/page/heidelberg-high-school

Heidelberg High School is in Heidelberg, Mississippi. It is in the East Jasper Consolidated School District (Jasper County, Mississippi). In 2025 it was ranked as the fifth best high school in Mississippi by U.S. News. Almost 100 percent of its students were documented as black and 100 percent economically disadvantaged. It is considered a "remote rural" school.

Kimberly Dawkins is the principal.

== History ==
Heidelberg High School had its first commencement in 1912.

=== South Side High School ===
South Side High School served the community's African Americans during segregation. It won state championships. Braves and Lady Braves were the school's mascots. Football coach Archie Cooley coached at South Side High School. In 1971 it became William J. Berry Elementary School.

=== Fire and deaths ===
In 1978, a fire that likely started in a boiler room destroyed the auditorium and two wings of the school. 18 of the school's 21 classrooms were also destroyed, but two wings constructed in 1967 survived the fire.

In 1999, a teacher died after being pushed onto concrete during a scuffle. The scuffle started after she confronted a student about a dress code violation. No charges were filed against the student who pushed her.

Two people were shot and killed including an expectant mother during homecoming events and a football game at the school in October 2025.

== Athletics ==
Oilers are the school's mascot. The school has:

- Cheerleaders
- Track and Field
- Varsity Football
- Girls Varsity Basketball
- Boys Varsity Basketball
- Volleyball
- Cross Country

In 2021, the school hired three new coaches.

== Alumni ==
- Daryl Terrell, football player
- Freddie Parker, football player
- Juan Barkett, former mayor of Heidelberg and a state legislator

== See also ==
- List of high schools in Mississippi
