= Vernon, Mississippi =

Vernon, Mississippi may refer to:

- Vernon, Jasper County, Mississippi
- Vernon, Madison County, Mississippi
- Vernon, Winston County, Mississippi
