= Daryl Terrell =

American football player (born 1975)

No. 78, 67
- Position: Offensive lineman

Personal information
- Born: January 25, 1975 (age 51); Vossburg, Mississippi, U.S.
- Listed height: 6 ft 4 in (1.93 m)
- Listed weight: 327 lb (148 kg)

Career information
- High school: Heidelberg (Heidelberg, Mississippi)
- College: Southern Miss
- NFL draft: 1997: undrafted

Career history
- Baltimore Ravens (1997)*; New Orleans Saints (1998–2001); → Amsterdam Admirals (1999); Jacksonville Jaguars (2002); Washington Redskins (2003)
- * Offseason or practice squad member only

Career NFL statistics
- Games played: 56
- Games started: 11
- Stats at Pro Football Reference

Daryl Lamon Terrell (born January 25, 1975) is an American former professional football player who was an offensive lineman in the National Football League (NFL) for the New Orleans Saints, the Jacksonville Jaguars, and Washington Redskins. He played college football at Jones County Junior College before transferring to the Southern Miss Golden Eagles program.

== Early life and college ==
Daryl Lamon Terrell was born on January 25, 1975, in Vossburg, Mississippi. He attended Heidelberg High School in Heidelberg, Mississippi.

Terrell first played college football at Jones County Junior College from 1993 to 1994. He then transferred to the University of Southern Mississippi, where he was a two-year letterman for the Golden Eagles from 1995 to 1996.

== Professional career ==
Terrell signed with the Baltimore Ravens as an undrafted free agent following the 1997 NFL draft, but was released on July 22, 1997.

Terrell signed with the New Orleans Saints on April 27, 1998. He was released on August 24 and signed to the team's practice squad on September 2, 1998. He spent the entire 1998 regular season on the Saints' practice squad. In February 1999, Terrell was allocated to NFL Europe to play for the Amsterdam Admirals. He played in 44 games, starting 11, with the Saints from 1999 to 2001.

Terrell signed with the Jacksonville Jaguars on June 3, 2002. He appeared in nine games with the Jaguars. He was released on February 27, 2003, and re-signed on February 28. He was released again on August 30, 2003.

Terrell was signed by the Washington Redskins on December 3, 2003. He was released on December 5 but re-signed on December 9, 2003. Terrell appeared in three games for the Redskins. He was released on September 5, 2004.
