= Simeon R. Adams =

Mississippi politician (1813–1860)

Member of the Mississippi State Senate from the Jasper, Newton, Scott, and Smith Counties district
- In office January 1844 – January 1848
- Preceded by: John C. Thomas
- Succeeded by: James McDugald

Personal details
- Born: 1813 or 1814 Vermont, U.S.
- Died: April 3, 1860 (aged 46–47) Paulding, Mississippi, U.S.
- Party: Democratic

Simeon Roe Adams (1813/1814 – April 3, 1860) was an American newspaper printer and politician. He served in the Mississippi State Senate from 1844 to 1848. He also owned the Eastern Clarion newspaper, a predecessor of The Clarion-Ledger, from 1839 to 1860.

== Biography ==
Simeon Roe Adams was born in Vermont in 1813 or 1814. He grew up in the state of Ohio and moved to New Orleans and then to Mississippi in early adulthood. He was a newspaper printer by trade who lived in Paulding, Mississippi. In 1839, Adams bought the Eastern Clarion newspaper (a predecessor of the Clarion-Ledger) from Governor John J. McRae. Adams would run the newspaper until his death.

In the 1840 session of the Mississippi State Senate, Adams was appointed its reading clerk. In 1843, he was elected to represent Jasper, Newton, Scott, and Smith Counties as a Democrat in the Mississippi State Senate for the 1844 session. In November 1845, Adams was re-elected and served in the 1846 session. Adams was a member of the Mississippi State Democratic Committee in 1843 and 1845. He was also the chairman of the Jasper County Democratic Committee in 1845.

Adams died at his home in Paulding on April 3, 1860.

== Personal life ==
Adams was married; his wife was named Isabella A. Adams. They had several young children who along with Isabella survived after Simeon's death.
