= Talbert A. Luster =

American politician

Member of the Mississippi House of Representatives from the Claiborne County district
- In office January 1912 – January 1920

Personal details
- Born: March 9, 1868 Cayuga, Mississippi
- Died: January 26, 1951 (aged 82)
- Party: Democrat
- Spouse(s): Mary Williams (1893-1903); Charlie McDowell (1907-)

Talbert Armand Luster (March 9, 1868 - January 26, 1951) was a Democratic member of the Mississippi House of Representatives, representing Claiborne County, from 1912 to 1920.

== Biography ==
Talbert Armand Luster was born on March 9, 1868, in Cayuga, Hinds County, Mississippi. He was the son of Miles Jerome Luster and Eliza Ann (Nixon) Luster. He was a member of the planter class. He graduated from the Iuka Normal Institute with a B. S. in 1892. He married Mary Rebecca Williams in 1893, and she died in 1903, leaving 2 children. He married Charlie Douglas McDowell, daughter of Solomon McDowell, in 1907. He died on January 26, 1951, and was buried in the cemetery in Cayuga.

== Political career ==
Luster was first elected to the Mississippi House of Representatives, representing Claiborne County, in November 1911. He was re-elected in 1915. He was a Democrat.
