= Success, Mississippi =

- Ghost town
- Location within Mississippi Location within the United States
- Coordinates: 32°12′10″N 89°17′00″W
- Country: United States
- State: Mississippi
- County: Jasper
- Elevation: 390 ft (120 m)
- Time zone: UTC-6 (Central (CST))
  - Summer (DST): UTC-5 (CDT)
- GNIS feature ID: 705253

Success is a ghost town in Jasper County, Mississippi, United States.

Success had a post office in the early 1900s.

The Success Cemetery is extant and located at the Decider Baptist Church, northwest of the settlement.

The former settlement is now located within the Bienville National Forest.
