= Charlie Armstrong (American football) =

American football player (1919–2001)

No. 72
- Positions: Halfback, fullback, quarterback

Personal information
- Born: April 20, 1919; Hickory, Mississippi, U.S.
- Died: July 20, 2001 (aged 82); Meridian, Mississippi, U.S.
- Listed height: 5 ft 10 in (1.78 m)
- Listed weight: 180 lb (82 kg)

Career information
- High school: Newton (MS)
- College: Mississippi College
- NFL draft: 1941: 12th round, 103rd overall pick

Career history
- Brooklyn Dodgers (1946)

Career NFL statistics
- Rushing yards: 78
- Rushing average: 3.5
- Passing yards: 126
- TD–INT: 1-2
- Passer rating: 39.1
- Stats at Pro Football Reference

Charles Andrew Armstrong (April 20, 1919 – July 20, 2001) was an American professional football halfback and fullback.

Armstrong was born in Hickory, Mississippi, in 1919 and attended Newton High School in Newton, Mississippi. He played college football at Mississippi College from 1938 to 1940. He was the leading scorer in the Dixie Conference in both 1939 and 1940 and was selected as the first-team quarterback on the 1940 All-Dixie Conference football team. In October 1940, the Clarion-Ledger wrote: "Armstrong is the answer to any coach's prayer as a triple-threat back. He does a large part of the running, practically all of the punting, and gives his roommate, Bob Majure, a helping hand with the passing attack of the Tribesmen."

Armstrong was selected by the Chicago Cardinals in the 12th round (103rd overall pick) of the 1941 NFL draft, but he never played in the NFL. He instead served in the military in the South Pacific during World War II. After the war, he played in the All-America Football Conference for the Brooklyn Dodgers in 1946. He appeared in 10 games, two of them as a starter, and rushed for 78 yards on 22 carries.

He died in 2001 in Meridian, Mississippi.
