= Garlandville, Mississippi =

- Unincorporated community
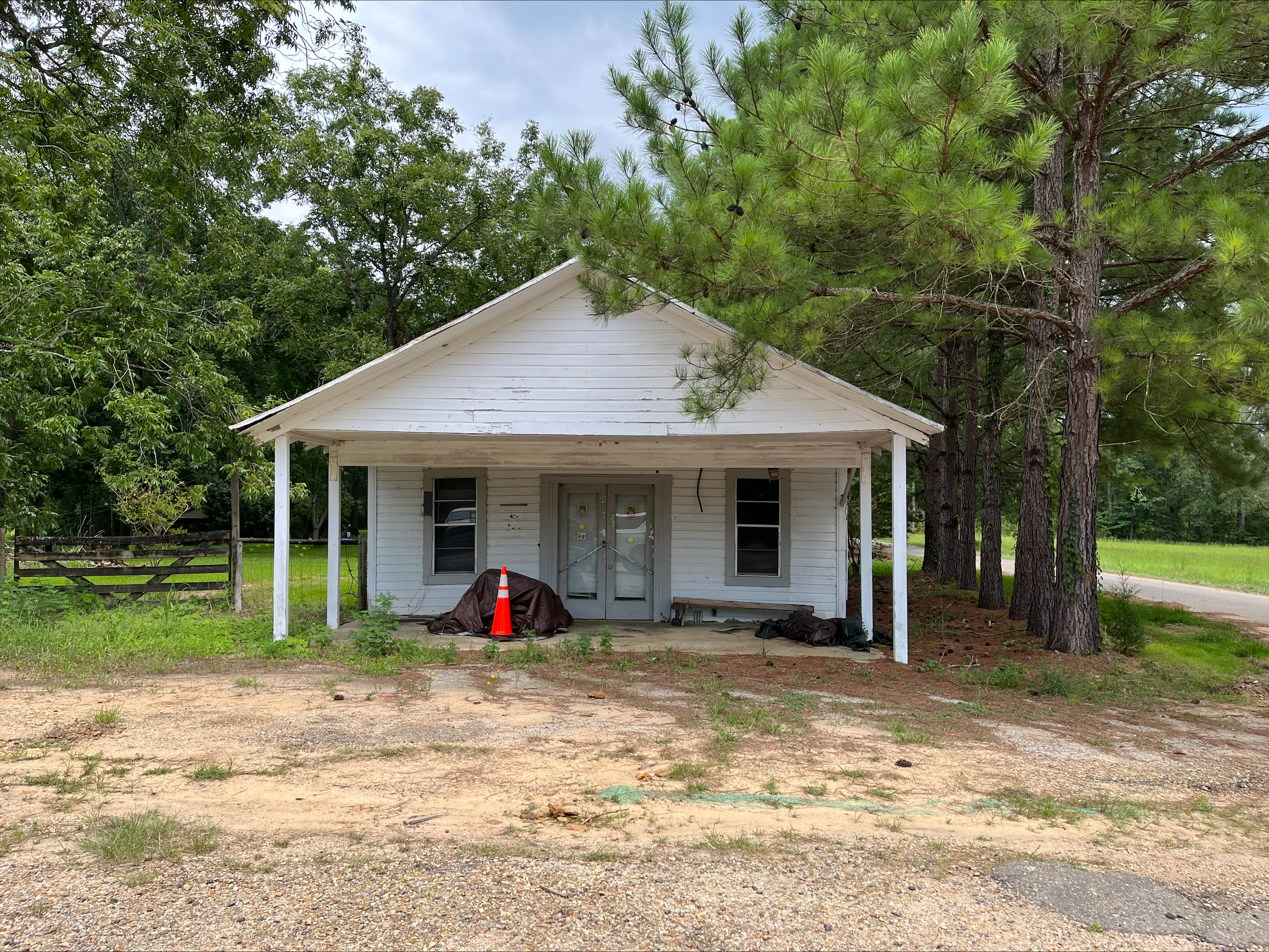
- Closed store in Garlandville

- Location within Mississippi Location within the United States
- Coordinates: 32°13′11″N 89°07′21″W
- Country: United States
- State: Mississippi
- County: Jasper
- Elevation: 456 ft (139 m)
- Time zone: UTC-6 (Central (CST))
  - Summer (DST): UTC-5 (CDT)
- Area code: 601
- GNIS feature ID: 693284

Garlandville is an unincorporated community in Jasper County, Mississippi, United States. Garlandville is 8.2 miles (13.2 km) south-southeast of Newton along Mississippi Highway 504.

Garlandville was first settled in 1833 and is one of the oldest communities in Jasper County. It was named for John Garland, who had a Scot father and a Choctaw mother, and operated a tavern in the area. Prior to the American Civil War, Garlandville reached the most prosperous point in its history.

Two companies of the Confederate States Army were raised in Garlandville: a Captain Chatfield's of the 20th Mississippi Infantry and a Captain Loper's of the 37th Mississippi Infantry.

During Grierson's Raid, the Union Army rode through Garlandville. One horse was killed and one soldier was seriously wounded when three shots were fired by home guard soldiers in Garlandville.

After the Civil War ended, most of the merchants and citizens moved away from Garlandville and only a few small businesses remained.

A post office operated under the name Garlandville from 1834 to 1953.
