= Freddie Parker =

American football player (born 1962)

No. 39
- Position: Running back

Personal information
- Born: July 6, 1962 (age 64); Heidelberg, Mississippi, U.S.
- Listed height: 5 ft 10 in (1.78 m)
- Listed weight: 215 lb (98 kg)

Career information
- High school: Heidelberg
- College: Mississippi Valley State (1981–1985)
- NFL draft: 1986: undrafted

Career history
- Green Bay Packers (1986–1987)

Career NFL statistics
- Rushing yards: 33
- Rushing average: 4.1
- Receptions: 3
- Receiving yards: 22
- Stats at Pro Football Reference

Freddie Parker (born July 6, 1962) is an American former professional football player. He played college football for the Mississippi Valley State Delta Devils and signed with the Green Bay Packers of the National Football League (NFL) as an undrafted free agent in 1986. He appeared in one game for the team during the 1987 season as a running back.

== Early life ==
Parker was born on July 6, 1962, in Heidelberg, Mississippi. He started playing football in sixth grade and when young made it his goal to play professionally. He attended Heidelberg High School, where he played football. After high school, he attended Mississippi Valley State University from 1981 to 1986, playing football for the Mississippi Valley State Delta Devils from 1982 to 1985.

Parker saw limited playing time in 1982, although he recorded an 86-yard touchdown run against Prairie View A&M, with the Delta Devils compiling a record of 5–5 that year. He ran 55 times and averaged 4.9 yards-per-carry as a sophomore in 1983, being described as a "jack of all trades", as his team went 7–2–1. Parker was one of their leading rushers in 1984, contributing to his team's 9–2 record. He was one of their top runners again as a senior in 1985 and helped the Delta Devils to a record of 8–3.

== Professional career and later life ==
Parker signed with the Green Bay Packers as an undrafted free agent in 1986. He scored a touchdown in preseason but suffered an ankle injury and was waived/injured on August 20, 1986. He re-signed with the Packers in 1987 but was released on August 31, 1987. He later returned to the Packers on September 23 as a replacement player during the 1987 NFL strike. He appeared in the team's Week 4 game against the Minnesota Vikings, running eight times for 33 yards while recording three receptions for 22 yards, but suffered an injury and did not appear in any more games. He was released by the Packers at the end of the strike on October 19, ending his professional career.

After his football career, Parker began working for Garland Independent School District in 1991 at the Cooperative Behavior Center. He then moved to Bussey Middle School and worked there for over 20 years as a special education and physical education teacher. He also served as their football coach. In 2013, he was inducted into the Mississippi Valley State Athletic Hall of Fame.
