= Vossburg, Mississippi =

- Unincorporated community
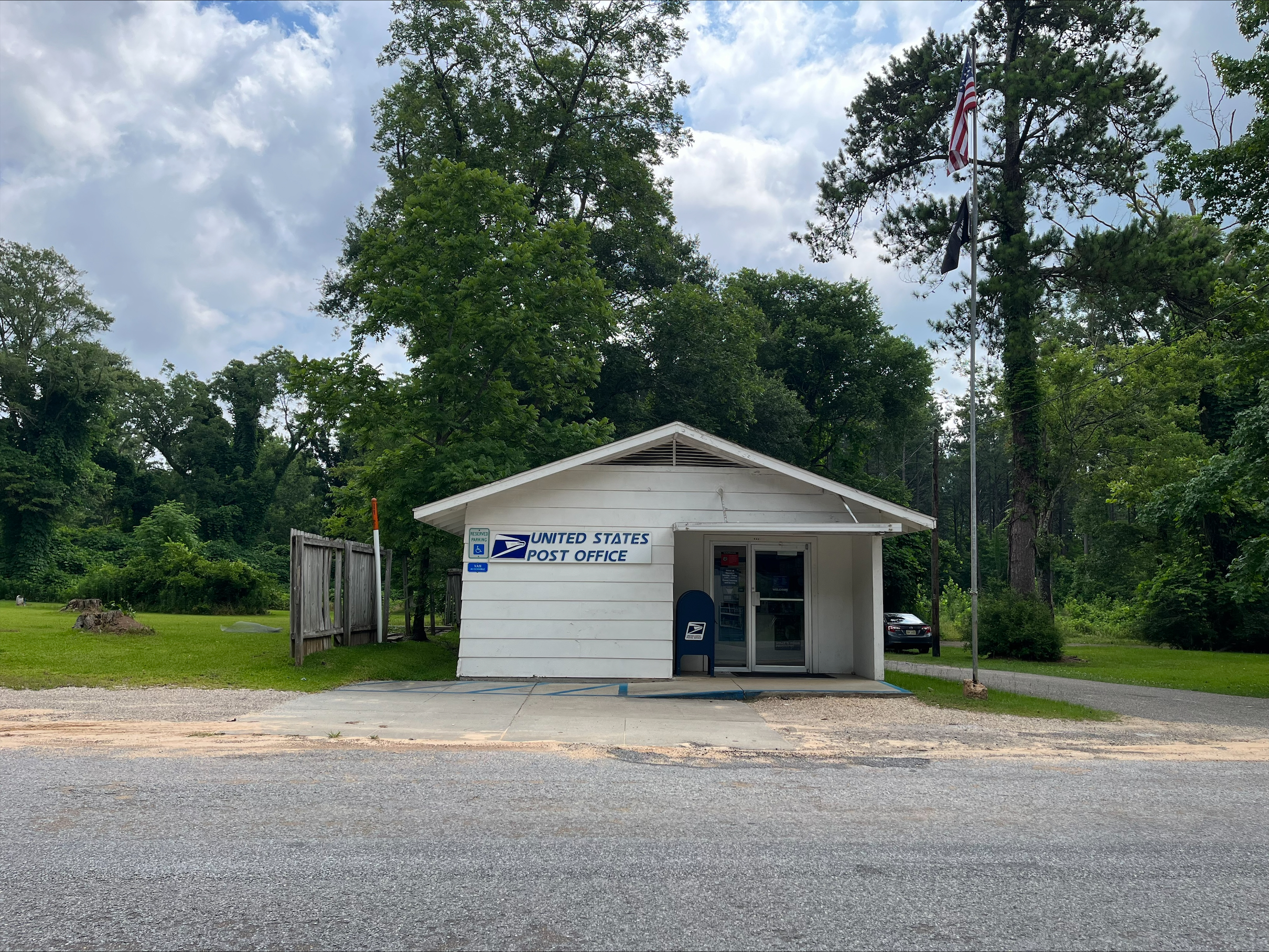
- Vossburg Post Office

- Location within Mississippi Location within the United States
- Coordinates: 31°55′44″N 88°56′27″W
- Country: United States
- State: Mississippi
- County: Jasper
- Elevation: 495 ft (151 m)
- Time zone: UTC-6 (Central (CST))
  - Summer (DST): UTC-5 (CDT)
- ZIP code: 39366
- Area codes: 601 & 769
- GNIS feature ID: 690941

Vossburg is an unincorporated community in Jasper County, Mississippi, United States. Its ZIP code is 39366.

== History ==
Vossburg is located on the Norfolk Southern Railway. The community was incorporated in 1900. The incorporation charter was repealed on March 17, 1904.

The community was once home to an express mail office, four stores, a church, a school, and a cotton gin. The community was also home to a lithia spring that was used for its purported healing qualities. The Vossburg Lithia Springs Company (based in Gulfport) advertised nationally and claimed that the water healed "albuminuria, diabetes mellitus, uric acid diathesis, [and] cystitis".

A post office operated under the name Vosburgh from 1882 to 1893, under the name Vosburg from 1893 to 1951, and first began operating under the name Vossburg in 1951.

== Notable people ==
- Tom Lester, actor, lived in Vossburg
- Daryl Terrell, American football player, born in Vossburg
