= Vernon, Jasper County, Mississippi =

Vernon, Mississippi
- Unincorporated community
- Location within Mississippi Location within the United States
- Coordinates: 31°54′37″N 89°09′12″W
- Country: United States
- State: Mississippi
- County: Jasper
- Elevation: 410 ft (120 m)
- Time zone: UTC-6 (Central (CST))
  - Summer (DST): UTC-5 (CDT)
- GNIS feature ID: 692294

Vernon is an unincorporated community in Jasper County, Mississippi, United States. Vernon is located on Tallahoma Creek. A post office operated under the name Vernon from 1893 to 1907.
