= Lake Como, Mississippi =

- Unincorporated community
- Location within Mississippi Location within the United States
- Coordinates: 31°57′45″N 89°12′45″W
- Country: United States
- State: Mississippi
- County: Jasper
- Elevation: 344 ft (105 m)
- Time zone: UTC-6 (Central (CST))
  - Summer (DST): UTC-5 (CDT)
- Area codes: 601 & 769
- GNIS feature ID: 691993

Lake Como is an unincorporated community located in Jasper County, Mississippi, United States. Lake Como lies one mile east of Tallahoma Creek.

A post office operated under the name Lake Como from 1859 to 1951.

The founder of Bay Springs, L. L. Denson, moved there from Lake Como in the early 1900s.
