= East Jasper School District =

School district in Mississippi

The East Jasper School District is a public school district based in Heidelberg, Mississippi (USA).

== Schools ==
- Heidelberg High School (Grades 7-12)
- William J. Berry Elementary School (Grades K-6), at the former South Side High School that was for African Americans prior to desegregation

== Demographics ==
=== 2024–25 school year ===
The district enrolled 739 students during the 2024–25 school year, according to the National Center for Education Statistics.

=== 2006-07 school year ===
There were a total of 1,217 students enrolled in the East Jasper School District during the 2006–2007 school year. The gender makeup of the district was 50% female and 50% male. The racial makeup of the district was 99.67% African American and 0.33% White. 90.3% of the district's students were eligible to receive free lunch.

=== Previous school years ===
School Year	Enrollment	Gender Makeup		Racial Makeup				
School Year	Enrollment	Female	Male	Asian	African American	Hispanic	Native American	White
2005-06	1,228	50%	50%	–	99.84%	–	–	0.16%
2004-05	1,176	51%	49%	–	99.83%	0.09%	–	0.09%
2003-04	1,215	50%	50%	–	98.93%	0.58%	–	0.49%
2002-03	1,226	50%	50%	–	99.76%	0.08%	0.08%	0.08%

== Accountability statistics ==
	2006-07	2005-06	2004-05	2003-04	2002-03
District Accreditation Status	Accredited	Accredited	Accredited	Accredited	Accredited
School Performance Classifications
Level 5 (Superior Performing) Schools	0	0	0	0	0
Level 4 (Exemplary) Schools	0	0	0	0	0
Level 3 (Successful) Schools	1	2	1	1	0
Level 2 (Under Performing) Schools	1	0	1	1	1
Level 1 (Low Performing) Schools	0	0	0	0	1
Not Assigned	0	0	0	0	0

== See also ==
- List of school districts in Mississippi
