= Cayuga, Mississippi =

Unincorporated community in Hinds County, Mississippi

- Unincorporated community
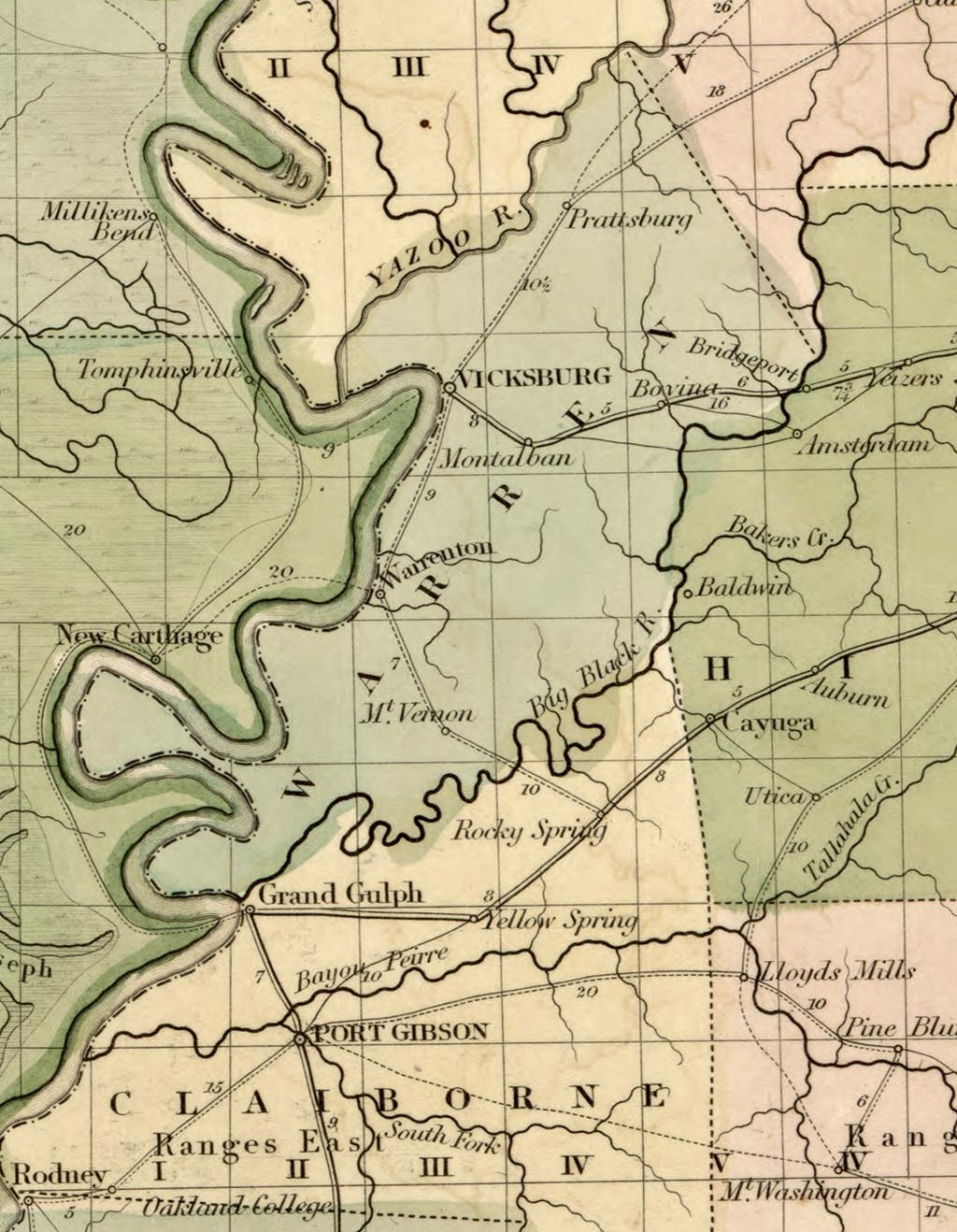
- Mississippi River between Vicksburg and Rodney c. 1839 showing major roads and towns north of Natchez

- Location within Mississippi Location within the United States
- Coordinates: 32°09′34″N 90°41′38″W
- Country: United States
- State: Mississippi
- County: Hinds
- Elevation: 269 ft (82 m)
- Time zone: UTC-6 (Central (CST))
  - Summer (DST): UTC-5 (CDT)
- Area code: 601
- GNIS feature ID: 668178

Cayuga is an unincorporated community in Hinds County, in the U.S. state of Mississippi.

== History ==
Cayuga was a point on the Natchez Trace, the stop after Rocky Springs when heading northeast toward Nashville. It lay within the Choctaw Nation, just outside the Anglo-Spanish colonial Natchez District. The community is named after Cayuga Lake, in New York. Cayuga was once home to two churches. A post office called Cayuga was established in 1829, and remained in operation until 1906. A variant name was "Cayuga Plantation".

== Notable person ==
- Talbert A. Luster, member of the Mississippi House of Representatives from 1912 to 1920.
