= Heidelberg, Mississippi =

- Town
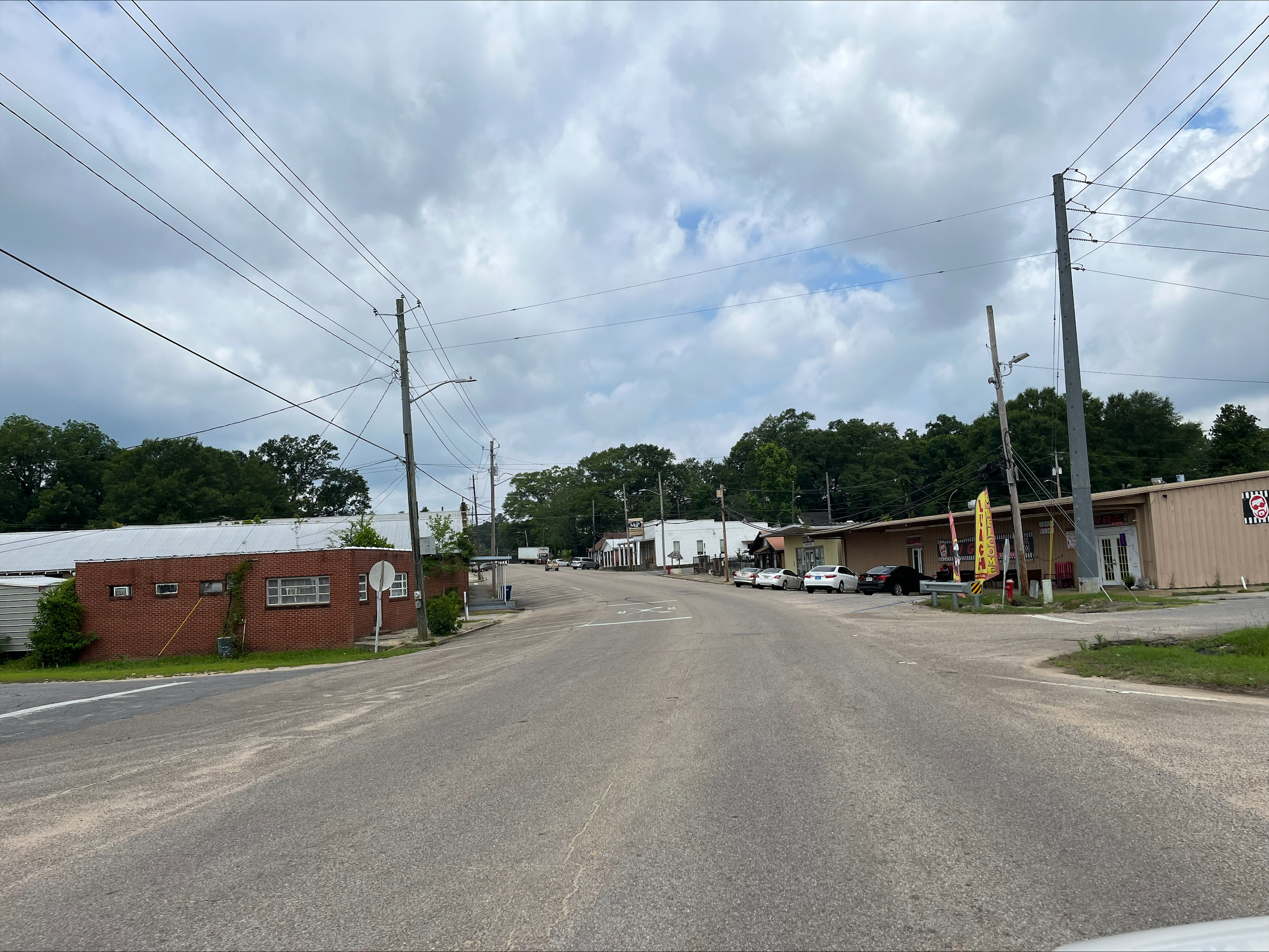
- Downtown Heidelberg

- Flag

- Location of Heidelberg, Mississippi

- Location in the United States
- Coordinates: 31°53′28″N 88°59′27″W
- Country: United States
- State: Mississippi
- County: Jasper

Area
  - Total: 5.13 sq mi (13.29 km^{2})
  - Land: 5.11 sq mi (13.24 km^{2})
  - Water: 0.019 sq mi (0.05 km^{2})
- Elevation: 344 ft (105 m)

Population (2020)
  - Total: 637
  - Density: 125/sq mi (48.1/km^{2})
- Time zone: UTC-6 (Central (CST))
  - Summer (DST): UTC-5 (CDT)
- ZIP code: 39439
- Area code: 601
- FIPS code: 28-31420
- GNIS feature ID: 0671086
- Website: townofheidelberg.net

Heidelberg (locally /ˈhaɪ.dɫ̩.bɚɡ/) is a town in Jasper County, Mississippi, United States. As of the 2020 census, Heidelberg had a population of 637.

== Geography ==
Heidelberg is located in southeastern Jasper County at 31°53′28″N 88°59′27″W (31.891249, -88.990952). The town limits extend northwest to encompass Exit 113 on Interstate 59. U.S. Route 11, running parallel to I-59, crosses the southeastern corner of the town. Both highways lead northeast 40 miles (64 km) to Meridian and southwest 16 miles (26 km) to Laurel.

According to the United States Census Bureau, Heidelberg has a total area of 5.1 square miles (13.3 km^{2}), of which 0.02 square miles (0.05 km^{2}), or 0.38%, are water. Beaver Creek, a tributary of Bogue Homo, runs through the town. Via Bogue Homo, the town is part of the Leaf River and thence the Pascagoula River watershed.

The area around Heidelberg has abundant natural resources, including nearby oil and gas reserves. Jasper County is the highest producer of oil in Mississippi.

== Demographics ==
Historical population
Census	Pop.	Note	%±
1890	216		—
1900	228		5.6%
1910	477		109.2%
1920	489		2.5%
1930	653		33.5%
1940	615		−5.8%
1950	863		40.3%
1960	1,049		21.6%
1970	1,112		6.0%
1980	1,098		−1.3%
1990	981		−10.7%
2000	840		−14.4%
2010	718		−14.5%
2020	637		−11.3%
U.S. Decennial Census

=== Racial and ethnic composition ===
Heidelberg town, Mississippi – racial and ethnic composition Note: the US Census treats Hispanic/Latino as an ethnic category. This table excludes Latinos from the racial categories and assigns them to a separate category. Hispanics/Latinos may be of any race.
Race / ethnicity (NH = Non-Hispanic)	Pop 2000	Pop 2010	Pop 2020	% 2000	% 2010	% 2020
White alone (NH)	220	127	76	26.19%	17.69%	11.93%
Black or African American alone (NH)	616	576	544	73.33%	80.22%	85.40%
Native American or Alaska Native alone (NH)	0	1	0	0.00%	0.14%	0.00%
Asian alone (NH)	0	0	0	0.00%	0.00%	0.00%
Native Hawaiian or Pacific Islander alone (NH)	0	0	0	0.00%	0.00%	0.00%
Other race alone (NH)	0	0	0	0.00%	0.00%	0.00%
Mixed-race or multiracial (NH)	1	2	14	0.12%	0.28%	2.20%
Hispanic or Latino (any race)	3	12	3	0.36%	1.67%	0.47%
Total	840	718	637	100.00%	100.00%	100.00%

=== 2020 census ===
As of the 2020 United States census, there were 637 people, 269 households, and 220 families residing in the town.

=== 2000 census ===
As of the census of 2000, there were 840 people, 320 households, and 224 families residing in the town. The population density was 164.3 inhabitants per square mile (63.4/km^{2}). There were 359 housing units at an average density of 70.2 per square mile (27.1/km^{2}). The racial makeup of the town was 73.33% African American, 26.31% White and 0.36% from two or more races. Hispanic or Latino people of any race were 0.36% of the population.

There were 320 households, out of which 29.4% had children under the age of 18 living with them, 40.6% were married couples living together, 25.6% had a female householder with no husband present, and 29.7% were non-families. 27.5% of all households were made up of individuals, and 14.4% had someone living alone who was 65 years of age or older. The average household size was 2.63 and the average family size was 3.19.

In the town, the population was spread out, with 26.5% under the age of 18, 9.5% from 18 to 24, 22.5% from 25 to 44, 22.5% from 45 to 64, and 18.9% who were 65 years of age or older. The median age was 38 years. For every 100 females, there were 81.4 males. For every 100 females age 18 and over, there were 75.8 males.

The median income for a household in the town was $21,063, and the median income for a family was $27,768. Males had a median income of $25,982 versus $16,667 for females. The per capita income for the town was $13,555. About 23.0% of families and 25.0% of the population were below the poverty line, including 29.9% of those under age 18 and 25.5% of those age 65 or over.

== Education ==
Heidelberg is served by the East Jasper School District.

- Heidelberg High School
- Heidelberg Junior High School
- The New William J. Berry Elementary School

=== Defunct school ===
- Heidelberg Academy (1971–2016) closed its doors after the 2015–2016 year due to financial difficulties. Former students' school records are stored at Sylva-Bay Academy, 24 miles (39 km) to the west in Bay Springs.

== Notable people ==
- Hamp King, state auditor of Mississippi 1964–1984
- E. Wilson Lyon, sixth president of Pomona College
- Freddie Parker, former running back in the National Football League
- Dennis Thomas, inductee of the College Football Hall of Fame, former college football head coach (South Carolina State), and former MEAC commissioner
