= Paulding, Mississippi =

- Unincorporated community
- Location within Mississippi
- Coordinates: 32°1′51″N 89°2′15″W
- Country: United States
- State: Mississippi
- County: Jasper
- Time zone: UTC-6 (Central (CST))
  - Summer (DST): UTC-5 (CDT)
- ZIP codes: 39348

Paulding is an unincorporated community in and one of the two county seats of Jasper County, Mississippi, United States. It is the only unincorporated county seat in Mississippi.

Settled in 1833, it was named by United States settlers in honor of Revolutionary War hero John Paulding. After its citizens refused to contribute to a new railroad, the community was bypassed in favor of Bay Springs, Mississippi, which was designated a railroad stop to the west and the second county seat. It attracted more development and industry.

As of the 2010 census, Paulding had a population of 838. Bay Springs' population was more than twice that, at 1,768.

== History ==
Paulding was settled by European Americans in 1833, during the period of Indian Removal in the Southeast. The new settlers named the community for John Paulding, a local citizen who had aided in the capture of the British spy, Major Andre during the Revolutionary War. Andre was the British Adjutant who conspired with Benedict Arnold in the betrayal of West Point, New York during the Revolutionary War.

In the nineteenth century Paulding had a population of more than 1,000 and was called "the Queen City of the East." Its elite were planters with cotton plantations, but many residents did not own slaves and were yeoman farmers. As plantations were developed to the west in Mississippi and Louisiana, this area of the state lost some population. The community's first courthouse was built from local materials.

In the late nineteenth century, developers sought local investors to support construction of a railroad through Paulding, but the planters had suffered with a low cotton market and could not invest in the project.

The railroad company shifted the route to the west of the county, creating a stop at Bay Springs, Mississippi, where a sawmill had been built in 1880. The railroad supported development of the timber industry in this area, as well as trade. The town was incorporated as a city about 1900. After it was designated by the state legislature as the second county seat in 1906, a new, much larger county courthouse was built there. The city was the center of businesses exploiting the yellow pine timber resources.

The original courthouse in Paulding burned in 1932, causing the loss of many records. A new courthouse was built, as Paulding remains one of the two state-designated county seats for Jasper County.

Paulding has a smaller courthouse and shared government facilities. Being bypassed by the railroad cost it future commercial and industrial development, and its population declined from the former peak in the mid-nineteenth century. Although the split county circuit initially had merit, given the eastern/western separation of Jasper County by roadways and relative isolation of the time due to limited transportation, since the 1930s the dual seats have likely been maintained for primarily political reasons.

In 1935-36 the first east-west road across the county was constructed between Bay Springs (west) and Rose Hill (in the east, just north of Paulding), which improved cross-county travel. The routing of the roadway through Rose Hill increased the relative isolation of Paulding. As of the 2010 census, Paulding's population is 90 percent African American; Bay Springs' population is 50 percent African American.

== Notable people ==
- Simeon R. Adams (c. 1814–1860), newspaper owner and politician
