= Jasper County, Mississippi =

County in Mississippi, United States

- County
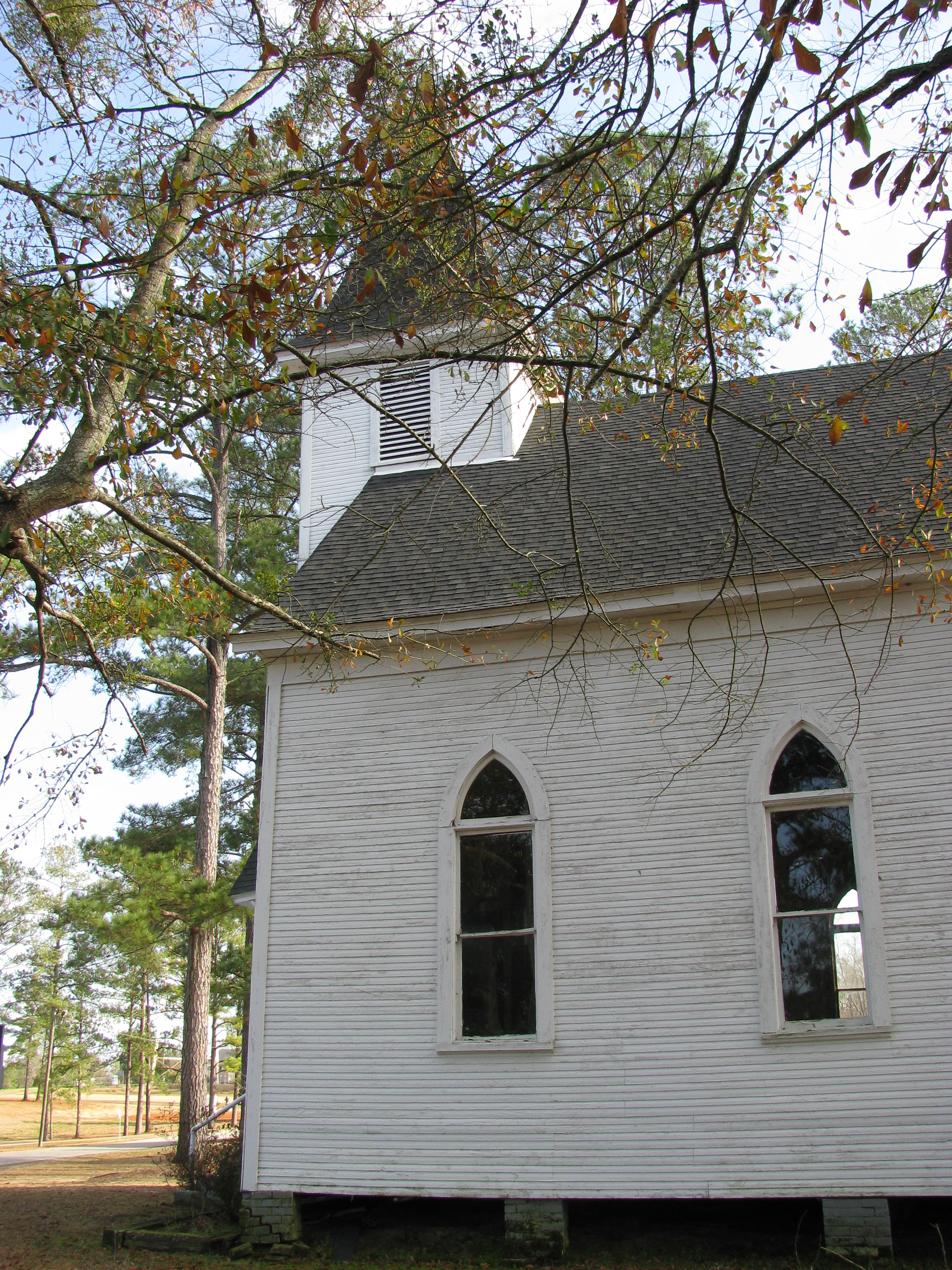
- Historic Montrose Presbyterian Church

- Location within the U.S. state of Mississippi
- Coordinates: 32°01′N 89°07′W
- Country: United States
- State: Mississippi
- Founded: 1833
- Named for: William Jasper
- Seat: Bay Springs and Paulding
- Largest city: Bay Springs

Area
  - Total: 677 sq mi (1,750 km^{2})
  - Land: 676 sq mi (1,750 km^{2})
  - Water: 1.2 sq mi (3.1 km^{2}) 0.2%

Population (2020)
  - Total: 16,367
  - Estimate (2025): 15,785 ▼
  - Density: 24.2/sq mi (9.35/km^{2})
- Time zone: UTC−6 (Central)
  - Summer (DST): UTC−5 (CDT)
- Congressional district: 3rd
- Website: co.jasper.ms.us

Jasper County is located in the U.S. state of Mississippi. At the 2020 census, the population was 16,367. In 1906, the state legislature established two county courts, one at the first county seat of Paulding in the eastern part of the county and also one at Bay Springs in the west, where the railroad had been constructed. Jasper County is part of the Laurel, MS Micropolitan Statistical Area.

Bay Springs' growth soon surpassed that of Paulding. No roadway connected the two parts of the county until one was built in 1935–1936. The still largely rural county is the major producer in the state of gas and oil, located in the southeast, and of timber, cattle, and poultry.

== History ==
Developed during the period of Indian Removal from the Southeast and increasing settlement by European Americans in the region, Jasper County was formed in 1833 from the middle section of what was previously a much larger Jones County. It was named for Sgt. William Jasper, who distinguished himself in the defense of Fort Moultrie in 1776 during the American Revolutionary War. When a shell from a British warship shot away the flagstaff, he recovered the flag, raised it on a temporary staff, and held it under fire until a new staff was installed. Jasper was killed in the Siege of Savannah in 1779.

During the antebellum years, cotton was cultivated with slave labor on large plantations in the county. This was the heyday of the county seat of Paulding, Mississippi, called the "Queen City of the East." It was a trading center for the plantations, as well as for yeomen farmers in the area. While some African Americans left the county in the early 20th century during the Great Migration out of the rural South to northern cities, in 2010 Jasper County had a population that was 52.6 percent African American, reflecting its history of cotton development and of people's ties to generations on this land.

In the late nineteenth century, when local people declined to invest in railroad construction at Paulding, developers shifted the route to the west, stimulating growth at Bay Springs, where a sawmill had been built in 1880. About 1900 that community was incorporated as a city. In 1906 the state legislature designated Bay Springs as the second county seat. It attracted major timber companies, such as Georgia Pacific, and other industries.

It was not until 1935–1936, during the Great Depression under a WPA project, that the first east–west road was built across the county, connecting the city of Bay Springs in the west with Rose Hill, north of the community of Paulding, in the east.

Medical facilities have been built at Bay Springs, with the Jasper General Hospital operating since 1962. Jasper General Patient Rehab was constructed on the hospital grounds in 2012 to supplement the offerings.

Recreation in the county includes a 9-hole golf course at the Bay Springs Country Club. Fishing and hunting are available, including around Lake Claude Bennett near Rose Hill.

In the 21st century, the county is still largely rural, leading the state in timber, cattle, and poultry production. It is the state's major producer of gas and oil, with resources concentrated near the community of Heidelberg.

== Geography ==
According to the U.S. Census Bureau, the county has a total area of 677 square miles (1,750 km^{2}), of which 676 square miles (1,750 km^{2}) is land and 1.2 square miles (3.1 km^{2}) (0.2%) is water.

=== Major highways ===
- Interstate 59
- U.S. Highway 11
- Mississippi Highway 15
- Mississippi Highway 18
- Mississippi Highway 503
- Mississippi Highway 513
- Mississippi Highway 528
- Mississippi Highway 531
- Mississippi Highway 533

=== Adjacent counties ===
- Newton County (north)
- Clarke County (east)
- Wayne County (southeast)
- Jones County (south)
- Smith County (west)

=== National protected area ===
- Bienville National Forest (part)

== Demographics ==
Historical population
Census	Pop.	Note	%±
1840	3,958		—
1850	6,184		56.2%
1860	11,007		78.0%
1870	10,884		−1.1%
1880	12,126		11.4%
1890	14,785		21.9%
1900	15,394		4.1%
1910	18,498		20.2%
1920	18,508		0.1%
1930	18,634		0.7%
1940	19,484		4.6%
1950	18,912		−2.9%
1960	16,909		−10.6%
1970	15,994		−5.4%
1980	17,265		7.9%
1990	17,114		−0.9%
2000	18,149		6.0%
2010	17,062		−6.0%
2020	16,367		−4.1%
2025 (est.)	15,785	▼	−3.6%
U.S. Decennial Census; 1790-1960 1900-1990; 1990-2000 2010-2013

=== Racial and ethnic composition ===
Jasper County, Mississippi – racial and ethnic composition Note: the US Census treats Hispanic/Latino as an ethnic category. This table excludes Latinos from the racial categories and assigns them to a separate category. Hispanics/Latinos may be of any race.
Race / ethnicity (NH = Non-Hispanic)	Pop 1980	Pop 1990	Pop 2000	Pop 2010	Pop 2020	% 1980	% 1990	% 2000	% 2010	% 2020
White alone (NH)	8,722	8,378	8,378	7,855	7,541	50.52%	48.95%	46.16%	46.04%	46.07%
Black or African American alone (NH)	8,378	8,680	9,561	8,944	8,324	48.53%	50.72%	52.68%	52.42%	50.86%
Native American or Alaska Native alone (NH)	8	8	11	14	28	0.05%	0.05%	0.06%	0.08%	0.17%
Asian alone (NH)	5	7	12	16	8	0.03%	0.04%	0.07%	0.09%	0.05%
Native Hawaiian or Pacific Islander alone (NH)	x	x	5	0	0	x	x	0.03%	0.00%	0.00%
Other race alone (NH)	1	0	0	4	19	0.01%	0.00%	0.00%	0.02%	0.12%
Mixed-race or multiracial (NH)	x	x	65	93	278	x	x	0.36%	0.55%	1.70%
Hispanic or Latino (any race)	151	41	117	136	169	0.87%	0.24%	0.64%	0.80%	1.03%
Total	17,265	17,114	18,149	17,062	16,367	100.00%	100.00%	100.00%	100.00%	100.00%

=== 2020 census ===
As of the 2020 census, the county had a population of 16,367. The median age was 43.0 years. 22.4% of residents were under the age of 18 and 20.5% of residents were 65 years of age or older. For every 100 females there were 94.0 males, and for every 100 females age 18 and over there were 90.4 males age 18 and over.

Less than 0.1% of residents lived in urban areas, while 100.0% lived in rural areas.

There were 6,725 households in the county, of which 29.3% had children under the age of 18 living in them. Of all households, 42.5% were married-couple households, 20.8% were households with a male householder and no spouse or partner present, and 32.0% were households with a female householder and no spouse or partner present. About 30.7% of all households were made up of individuals and 14.4% had someone living alone who was 65 years of age or older.

There were 8,029 housing units, of which 16.2% were vacant. Among occupied housing units, 82.3% were owner-occupied and 17.7% were renter-occupied. The homeowner vacancy rate was 0.6% and the rental vacancy rate was 7.3%.

== Education ==
There are two school districts:

- East Jasper School District
- West Jasper School District

The county is in the zone for Jones College.

== Communities ==
=== City ===
- Bay Springs (county seat)

=== Towns ===
- Heidelberg
- Louin
- Montrose

=== Unincorporated communities ===
- Garlandville
- Lake Como
- Moss
- Paulding
- Rose Hill
- Stafford Springs
- Stringer
- Vernon
- Vossburg

=== Ghost town ===
- Success

== In popular culture ==
The Veteran's Story is a book written by Ada Christine Lightsey. The subject of the book is American Civil War veteran Ransom Lightsey and Company F ("Jasper Grays"), 16th Mississippi Infantry Regiment.

== Politics ==
Jasper County was originally almost unanimously Democratic, and it has been a Democratic-leaning swing county ever since the civil rights movement. From 1984 through 2000, the county was a bellwether, predicting the presidential election winner, but it lost that status in 2004 when it voted for Democrat John Kerry over incumbent Republican George W. Bush. After that, it was loyal to Democrats, especially through the Obama era. The Democratic margin then began narrowing, and in 2024 Donald Trump flipped the county with the highest Republican percentage since 1984.

United States presidential election results for Jasper County, Mississippi
Year	Republican		Democratic		Third party(ies)	
Year	No.	%	No.	%	No.	%
1912	12	1.27%	860	91.30%	70	7.43%
1916	38	3.41%	1,040	93.27%	37	3.32%
1920	98	9.68%	899	88.83%	15	1.48%
1924	61	4.62%	1,257	95.30%	1	0.08%
1928	625	38.97%	979	61.03%	0	0.00%
1932	38	2.41%	1,526	96.64%	15	0.95%
1936	21	1.04%	2,004	98.87%	2	0.10%
1940	35	2.00%	1,713	98.00%	0	0.00%
1944	47	2.74%	1,667	97.26%	0	0.00%
1948	26	1.34%	121	6.23%	1,795	92.43%
1952	668	26.30%	1,872	73.70%	0	0.00%
1956	287	11.74%	1,958	80.08%	200	8.18%
1960	362	14.87%	1,147	47.10%	926	38.03%
1964	2,994	92.69%	236	7.31%	0	0.00%
1968	373	8.36%	987	22.13%	3,100	69.51%
1972	3,597	78.47%	935	20.40%	52	1.13%
1976	2,356	42.74%	3,109	56.39%	48	0.87%
1980	2,781	41.68%	3,813	57.14%	79	1.18%
1984	3,727	54.00%	3,104	44.97%	71	1.03%
1988	3,368	51.25%	3,184	48.45%	20	0.30%
1992	2,789	43.39%	3,059	47.59%	580	9.02%
1996	2,615	42.50%	3,170	51.52%	368	5.98%
2000	3,294	51.09%	3,104	48.15%	49	0.76%
2004	3,855	48.13%	4,117	51.40%	37	0.46%
2008	4,135	44.90%	5,025	54.56%	50	0.54%
2012	4,193	44.89%	5,097	54.57%	50	0.54%
2016	4,038	47.65%	4,368	51.54%	69	0.81%
2020	4,302	49.24%	4,341	49.69%	93	1.06%
2024	4,118	52.19%	3,722	47.17%	50	0.63%

== See also ==
- National Register of Historic Places listings in Jasper County, Mississippi
