= Hickory, Mississippi =

- Town
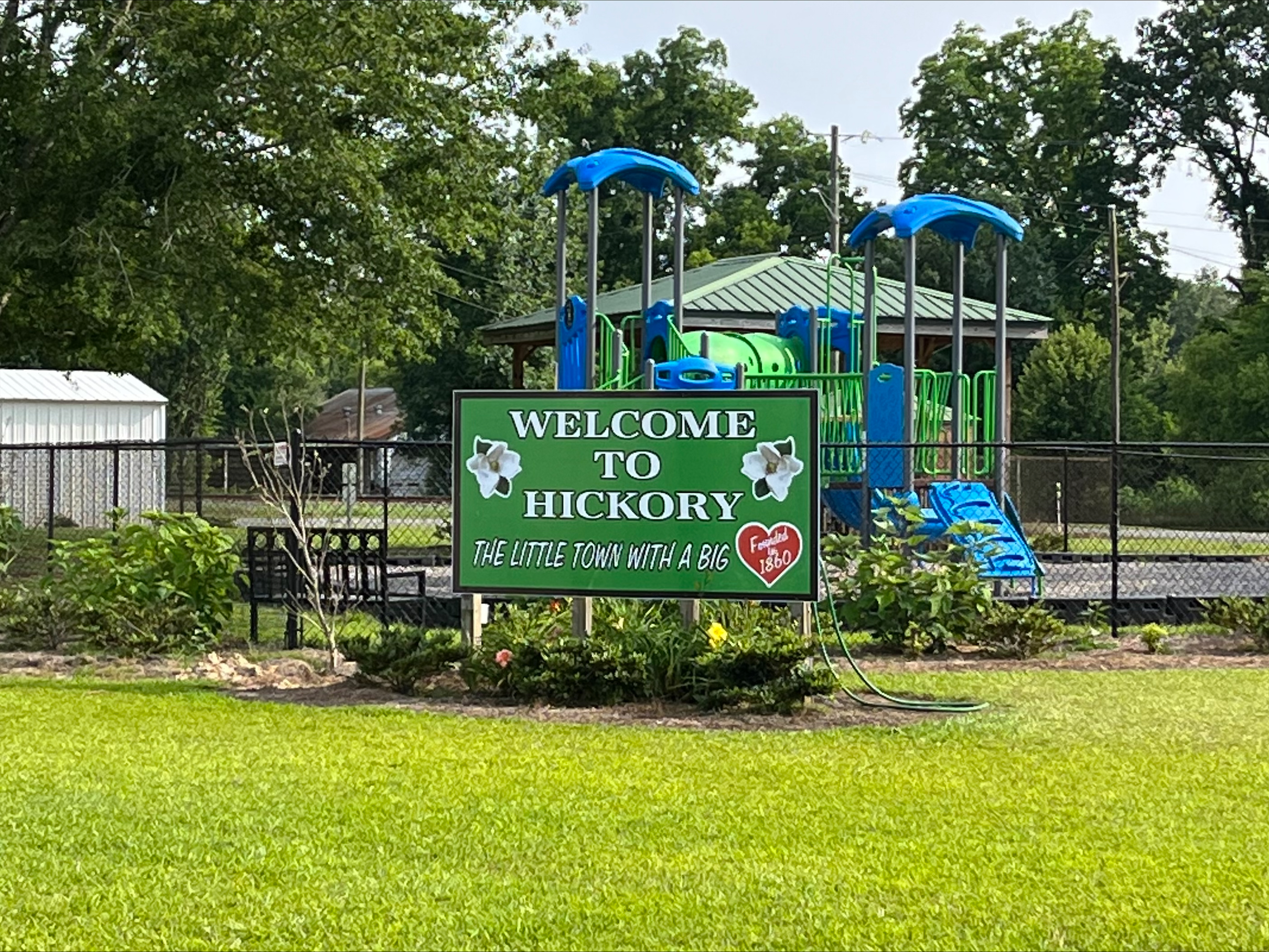
- Hickory Welcome Sign

- Location of Hickory, Mississippi

- Location in the United States
- Coordinates: 32°19′1″N 89°1′24″W
- Country: United States
- State: Mississippi
- County: Newton

Area
  - Total: 0.93 sq mi (2.42 km^{2})
  - Land: 0.93 sq mi (2.42 km^{2})
  - Water: 0 sq mi (0.00 km^{2})
- Elevation: 330 ft (100 m)

Population (2020)
  - Total: 408
  - Density: 436.1/sq mi (168.38/km^{2})
- Time zone: UTC-6 (Central (CST))
  - Summer (DST): UTC-5 (CDT)
- ZIP code: 39332
- Area code: 601
- FIPS code: 28-31980
- GNIS feature ID: 0671148

Hickory is a town in Newton County, Mississippi. As of the 2020 census, Hickory had a population of 408. The town is named after Andrew Jackson, who was nicknamed "Old Hickory."

== Geography ==
Hickory is located at 32°19′01″N 89°01′24″W.

According to the United States Census Bureau, the town has a total area of 0.9 square miles (2.3 km^{2}), all land.

== Demographics ==
Historical population
Census	Pop.	Note	%±
1870	155		—
1900	626		—
1910	600		−4.2%
1920	618		3.0%
1930	736		19.1%
1940	724		−1.6%
1950	614		−15.2%
1960	539		−12.2%
1970	570		5.8%
1980	670		17.5%
1990	493		−26.4%
2000	499		1.2%
2010	530		6.2%
2020	408		−23.0%
U.S. Decennial Census

=== Racial and ethnic composition ===
Hickory town, Mississippi – Racial and ethnic composition Note: the US Census treats Hispanic/Latino as an ethnic category. This table excludes Latinos from the racial categories and assigns them to a separate category. Hispanics/Latinos may be of any race.
Race / Ethnicity (NH = Non-Hispanic)	Pop 2000	Pop 2010	Pop 2020	% 2000	% 2010	% 2020
White alone (NH)	215	252	165	43.09%	47.55%	40.44%
Black or African American alone (NH)	275	258	228	55.11%	48.68%	55.88%
Native American or Alaska Native alone (NH)	1	1	2	0.20%	0.19%	0.49%
Asian alone (NH)	0	0	0	0.00%	0.00%	0.00%
Native Hawaiian or Pacific Islander alone (NH)	0	0	0	0.00%	0.00%	0.00%
Other race alone (NH)	0	0	0	0.00%	0.00%	0.00%
Mixed race or Multiracial (NH)	5	3	8	1.00%	0.57%	1.96%
Hispanic or Latino (any race)	3	16	5	0.60%	3.02%	1.23%
Total	499	530	408	100.00%	100.00%	100.00%

=== 2020 census ===
As of the 2020 United States census, there were 408 people, 157 households, and 137 families residing in the town.

=== 2000 census ===
As of the census of 2000, there were 499 people, 190 households, and 137 families residing in the town. The population density was 535.9 inhabitants per square mile (206.9/km^{2}). There were 207 housing units at an average density of 222.3 per square mile (85.8/km^{2}). The racial makeup of the town was 43.69% White, 55.11% African American, 0.20% Native American, and 1.00% from two or more races. Hispanic or Latino of any race were 0.60% of the population.

There were 190 households, out of which 32.6% had children under the age of 18 living with them, 42.1% were married couples living together, 24.2% had a female householder with no husband present, and 27.4% were non-families. 24.7% of all households were made up of individuals, and 13.7% had someone living alone who was 65 years of age or older. The average household size was 2.63 and the average family size was 3.10.

In the town, the population was spread out, with 29.3% under the age of 18, 9.6% from 18 to 24, 27.3% from 25 to 44, 18.8% from 45 to 64, and 15.0% who were 65 years of age or older. The median age was 35 years. For every 100 females, there were 80.8 males. For every 100 females age 18 and over, there were 68.1 males.

The median income for a household in the town was $25,417, and the median income for a family was $29,286. Males had a median income of $30,313 versus $20,000 for females. The per capita income for the town was $11,700. About 21.4% of families and 26.1% of the population were below the poverty line, including 32.1% of those under age 18 and 39.7% of those age 65 or over.

== Education ==
The Town of Hickory is served by the Newton County School District.

== Notable people ==
- Charlie Armstrong, former NFL Halfback, fullback, quarterback
- Joe Gibbon, professional baseball player
- Mike Granger, sprinter
- D. Michael Hurst Jr., United States Attorney for the United States District Court for the Southern District of Mississippi
- Bob Johnson, founder of BET
- Georgia Tann, former head of the Tennessee Children's Home Society
- Jake Austin Walker, actor and singer

== Gallery ==
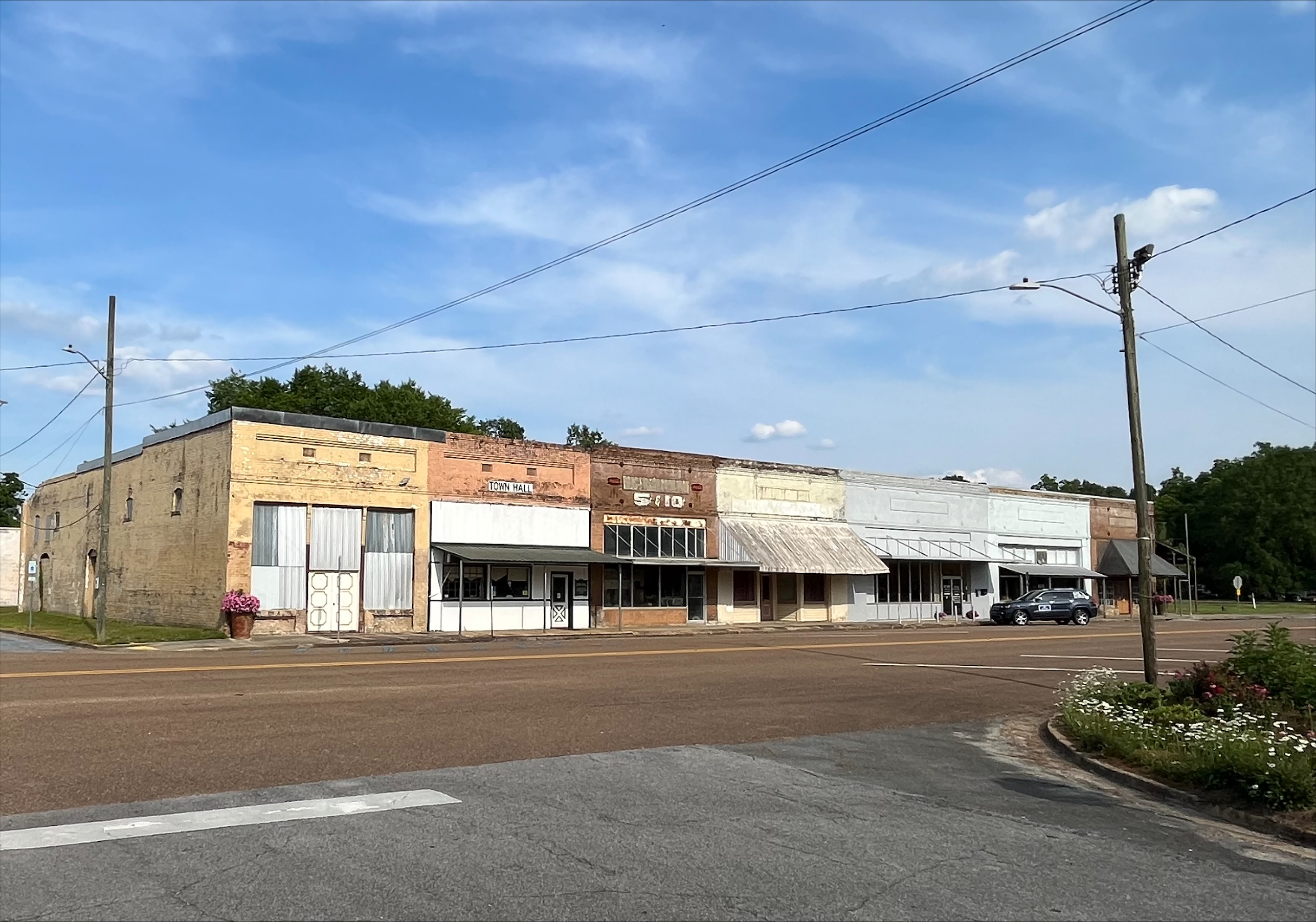
Downtown Hickory

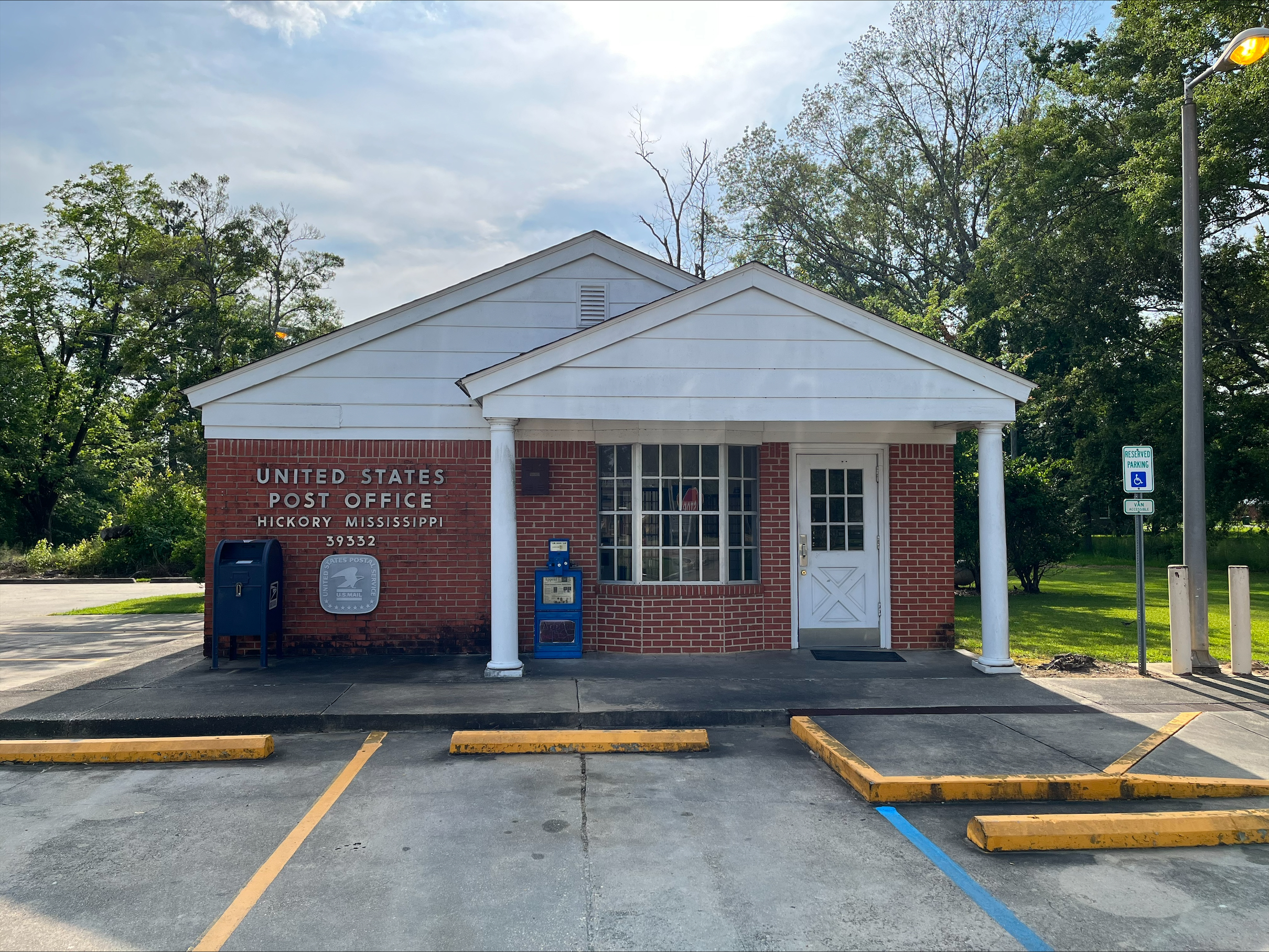
Hickory Post Office
