= 1963 Mississippi House of Representatives election =

- November 5, 1963

122 seats in the Mississippi House of Representatives 62 seats needed for a majority
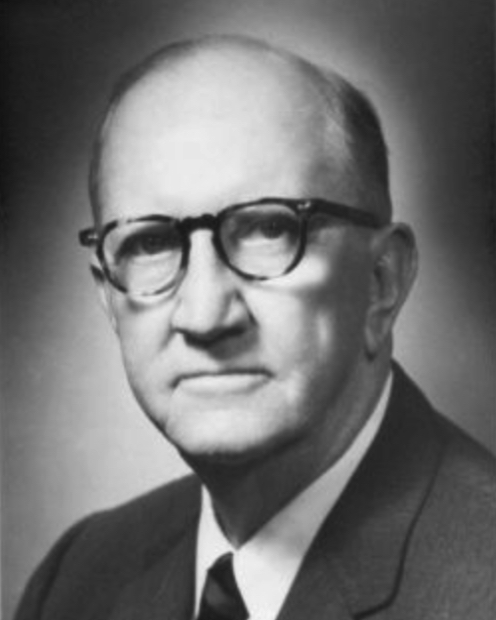

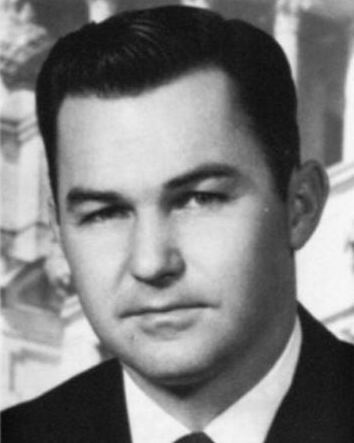
	Majority party	Minority party
Leader	Walter Sillers Jr.	Lewis McAllister
Party	Democratic	Republican
Leader's seat	Bolivar	Lauderdale
Seats before	139	1
Seats won	121	1
Seat change	▼18	Steady
Popular vote	93,996 (Note: Popular vote count based on a combination of official and unofficial returns)	41,811
Percentage	69.21%	30.79%
- Results: Democratic hold Republican hold Multi-member districts: Majority Democratic
Speaker before election
Walter Sillers Jr.
Democratic
Elected Speaker
Walter Sillers Jr.
Democratic

The 1963 Mississippi House of Representatives election was held on November 5, 1963, in the U.S. State of Mississippi to elect members of the Mississippi House of Representatives for its 1964 session. The Democratic primaries were held on August 6, with runoffs held if necessary on August. 27.

This was the first state house election after the 1963 referendum passing reapportionment of the state legislature, the first time the state had done so since 1890. The state house shrunk from 140 members to 122.

Lewis McAllister, the sole Republican in the legislature, held onto his seat in Lauderdale County by a slim margin. McAllister was first elected in a special election earlier that year in February. There were no Republicans on the ballot in Mississippi in the 1959 general election.

The election was held alongside elections for governor and state senate.

== General election ==
Most races were unopposed. All races not listed here were won by the Democratic nominee without Republican or independent opposition.

County/post	Outcome	Democrats			Republicans			Total	Majority		Ref.
County/post	Outcome	Candidate	Vote	%	Candidate	Vote	%	Total	Vote	%	Ref.
Forrest 1	Dem Hold	Stone Barefield	65,488	76.75	Harold Davis	1,965	23.25	8,453	+4,523	+53.51
Forrest 2	Dem Hold	Rex K. Jones	6,850	79.63	Rome A. Emmons Jr.	1,752	20.37	8,602	+5,098	+59.27
Harrison 2	Dem Hold	Jeff Evans	7,068	52.50	Ken Sadler	6,395	47.50	13,463	+673	+5.00
Hinds 4	Dem Hold	Billy Thompson	16,087	65.30	Swan Yerger	8,550	34.70	24,637	+7,537	+30.59
Hinds 5	Dem Hold	William McKinley	16,208	68.30	Swan Yerger	7,524	31.70	23,732	+8,684	+36.59
Jackson 1	Dem Hold	N. C. Everett	6,709	77.70	Robert Pelton	1,926	22.30	8,635	+4,783	+55.39	*
Jackson 2	Dem Hold	Mabry Penton	6,228	71.32	Wallace Sherwood	2,505	28.68	8,733	+3,723	+42.63	*
Jackson 3	Dem Hold	Ted Millette	6,519	71.61	Robert Baker	2,585	28.39	9,104	+3,934	+43.21	*
Lauderdale	Rep Hold	Jim B. Collier	3,482	49.71	Lewis McAllister	3,522	50.29	7,004	−40	−0.57	*
Leflore 2	Dem Hold	Estes McDaniel	2,846	68.12	Hugh Arant	1,332	31.88	4,178	+1,514	+36.24	*
Pike 2	Dem Hold	Elwood Branch	4,262	86.49	Charles Stogner	666	13.51	4,928	+3,596	+72.97
Pontotoc	Dem Hold	DeVan Dalls	2,791	88.46	Floyce Kidd	364	11.54	3,155	+2,427	+76.93	*
Simpson	Dem Hold	Jack Warren	4,260	88.73	Charles Meadows	541	11.27	4,801	+3,719	+77.46
Sunflower	Dem Hold	Fred Jones	1,969	54.39	Tate Stokely	1,651	45.61	3,620	+318	+8.78	*
Tippah	Dem Hold	Griffin Ladner Jr.	2,229	80.70	William McKinstry	533	19.30	2,762	+1,696	+61.40	*

Sources marked with an asterisk (*) denote those with only unofficial results.
