= Coosha =

- U.S. National Register of Historic Places
- Nearest city: Lizelia, Mississippi
- Area: 14 acres (5.7 ha)
- NRHP reference No.: 78001608
- Added to NRHP: November 21, 1978

Coosha, also commonly known as Coosha Town, is a former settlement of the Choctaw Nation in Lauderdale County, Mississippi. It was a member of the larger community known commonly as the "Coosha towns," which made up part of the Eastern division of the Choctaw Nation in pre-colonial America. The village, which has been abandoned since the mid-nineteenth century, was listed on the National Register of Historic Places (NRHP) in 1978.

== Confusion around spelling and location ==
The name "Coosha" is derived from the Choctaw "Kushak" or "Kusha", meaning "reed" or sometimes "reed-brake" because most of the area around the headwaters of the Chickasawhay River was covered in reed-brake before European settlers arrived. The reeds were so tall that the native Choctaw were able to and often would hide horses stolen from plantations by white thieves, prompting a creek nearby Coosha to be named "Issuba in Kannia bok" (English: "Lost Horse Creek"). The most common English transliteration of the name is probably "Koonsha", but the town's name is sometimes also spelled "Coucha", "Kunshak", "Coonsha", "Conshaques", or "Concha". The National Register Information System, a database of listings on the National Register of Historic Places, uses the spelling "Coosha."

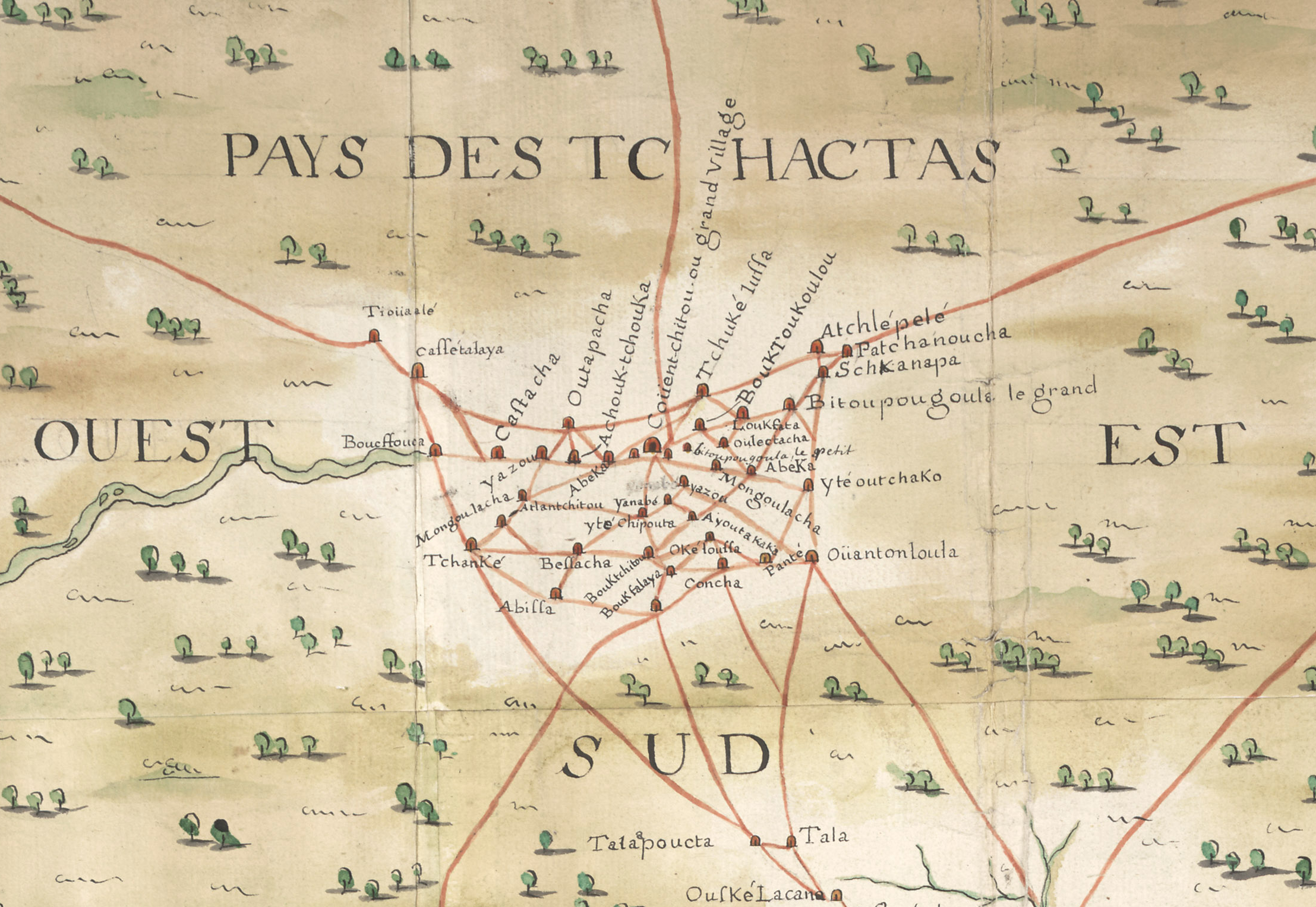
1733 map by Baron de Crenay
("Concha")

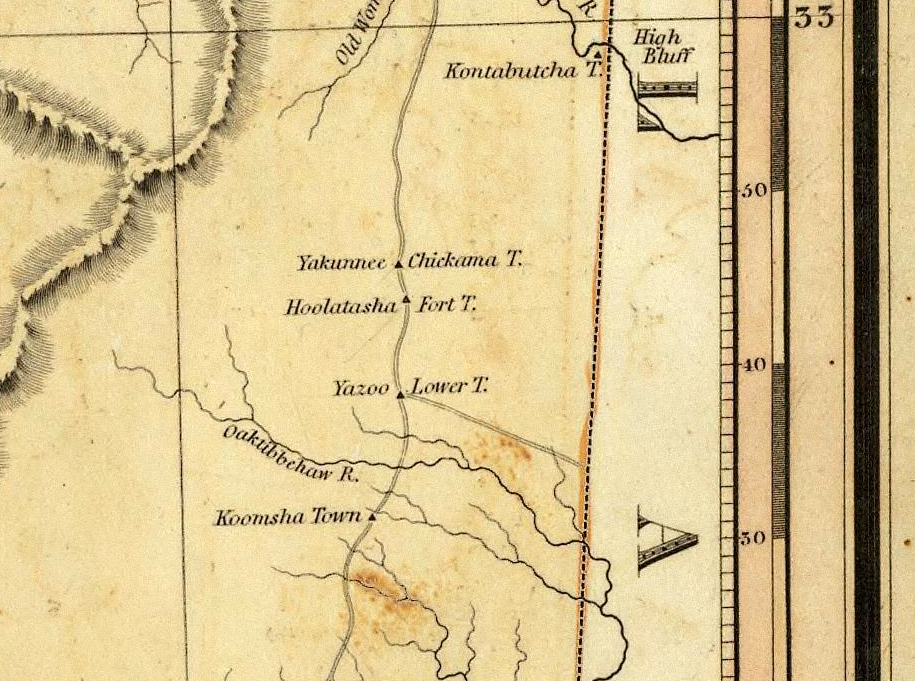
1820 map by Henry Schenck Tanner
("Koomsha Town")

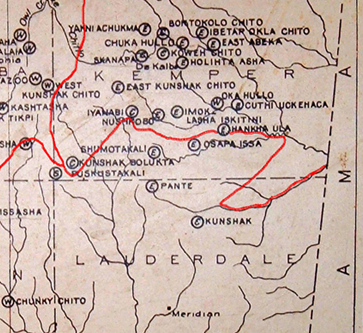
1931 map by John R. Swanton
("Kunshak")

Coosha is listed as "Concha" on Jean Baptiste Bourguignon d'Anville's map of 1732 and Baron de Crenay's map of 1733 and as "Coosha" on Bernard Romans's map of 1775. On the 1820 map "Louisiana and Mississippi" by Henry Schenck Tanner, it is shown as "Koomsha Town." On John R. Swanton's 1931 map included in his book Source Material for the Social and Ceremonial Life of the Choctaw Indians, the town's name is spelled "Kunshak."

Though Coosha appears on many early maps, the precise location of the settlement is not well documented. Richelle Putnam states in Lauderdale County, Mississippi: A Brief History (2011) that the site is located near present-day Naval Air Station Meridian, close to Daleville, Mississippi. The Publications of the Mississippi Historical Society in 1902 locates the settlement four miles southeast of "Old Daleville," now known as Lizelia, Mississippi. Both sources claim the settlement was located near Lost Horse Creek, a tributary of Ponta Creek. The settlement extended along a bluff for approximately 1 mile (1.6 km) to 2.5 miles (4.0 km) along Lost Horse Creek. Two prongs of the creek–one from the west and one from the south–join "in the northeast corner of section 30, township 8, range 16, east"; Coosha was located on the north side of the west prong. When the site was added to the National Register of Historic Places in 1978, it was listed with a restricted address to prevent looters from robbing the site of its archaeological artifacts.

Some of the confusion around the naming and the location of the village may be attributed to the fact that there may have been multiple villages with the same name in the area. Other towns located along the Ponta Creek were also called the "Coosha towns" or "Concha towns" in general, so some early writers may have conflated the general term with the specific village.

== History ==
Coosha dates back to at least the 18th century, possibly further. When Henry B. Collins excavated the site in 1925, he found graves which he dated to the period between 1800 and 1830. Artifacts extracted from the site have been dated as far back as 500 BCE, but the Choctaw that lived here during Coosha's existence were likely the first humans to inhabit the area "since Alexander times," according to the site's NRHP nomination form.

The Choctaws coalesced as a nation in the 16th and 17th centuries as a mixture of previous Mississippian cultures. According to Patricia Galloway, the Choctaw region of Mississippi was slowly occupied by Burial Urn people from the Bottle Creek Indian Mounds area in the Mobile, Alabama delta, along with remnants of people from the Moundville chiefdom (near present-day Tuscaloosa, Alabama), which had collapsed in the mid-14th century. Facing severe depopulation due to European diseases, the two groups fled westward, where they came upon the Plaquemines and a group of “prairie people” living near the area. In the space of several generations, the combination of these individual groups created a new society which became known as Choctaw.

By the turn of the 18th century, the Choctaw had divided (politically) into three main districts. The Burial Urn people were likely the first inhabitants of the Coosha and Chickasawhay towns, which together made up the Eastern District, and the Plaquemines and prairie people inhabited what is today considered the southern district, more commonly known as the Six Towns District. A third collection of tribes, mostly Black Prairie Muskogeans, made up what would be called the Western District.

The Coosha towns in the Eastern District numbered about forty or fifty. At its peak, the Coosha village itself had a population of approximately 1200 people. The village was home to orchards of peaches and plums and contained fauna such as bear, deer, turkey, squirrels, and wild cats. Small gardens containing maize were dispersed throughout the hamlets of the village.

Perhaps the most notable person to be associated with the village is the chief Pushmataha, who served as mingo of the Coosha towns for a short period. Oklahoma, the nephew of Pushmataha, succeeded Pushmataha as mingo, and upon his death in 1846, the town of Coosha seems to have been deserted.

== See also ==
- Mississippi Band of Choctaw Indians
- Choctaw
