= Lovell Harden =

American baseball player

- Pitcher
- Born: December 17, 1917; Lauderdale, Mississippi, U.S.
- Died: November 15, 1996 (aged 78); Erie, Pennsylvania, U.S.
- Batted: Right Threw: Right

Negro league baseball debut
- 1943, for the Cleveland Buckeyes

Last appearance
- 1945, for the Cleveland Buckeyes

Teams
- Cleveland Buckeyes (1943–1945)

Lovell Harden (December 17, 1917 – November 15, 1996), nicknamed "Big Pitch", was an American Negro league pitcher in the 1940s.

A native of Lauderdale, Mississippi, Harden played for the Cleveland Buckeyes from 1943 to 1945. He died in Erie, Pennsylvania, in 1996 at age 78.
