= Mississippi Highway 39 =

State Highway in Mississippi

Mississippi Highway 39
- MS 39 highlighted in red

Route information
- Maintained by MDOT
- Length: 49.676 mi (79.946 km)
- Existed: 1932–present

Major junctions
- South end: I-20 / I-59 / US 11 / US 80 in Meridian
- North end: US 45 in Shuqualak

Location
- Country: United States
- State: Mississippi
- Counties: Lauderdale, Kemper, Noxubee

Highway system
- Mississippi State Highway System; Interstate; US; State
← MS 37	→ MS 41

Mississippi Highway 39 (MS 39) is a major south to north highway in the U.S. state of Mississippi. Spanning 49.7 miles (80.0 km), it connects Meridian and NAS Meridian with DeKalb and Shuqualak.

== Route description ==
MS 39 begins in Lauderdale County in the city of Meridian at the interchange between I-20/59, US 11/80, and MS 19 (Exit 154 A/B on I-20/59). It heads northwest through a business district as a four-lane undivided highway to cross Sowashee Creek and have an interchange with Russell Drive/B Street before making a sharp right onto Front Street (Original US 45). The highway now makes a sharp left turn at the southern end of unsigned MS 884 (OLD US 45) and heads north as a divided highway through neighborhoods and suburbs for several miles before leaving the city limits and entering the hilly woodlands of the North Central Hills. MS 39 passes through the community of Lizelia, where it has an intersection with MS 854 (John C Stennis Drive; provides access to the community of Meridian Station and Naval Air Station Meridian) and narrows to two-lanes, before passing through the community of Daleville and crossing into Kemper County.

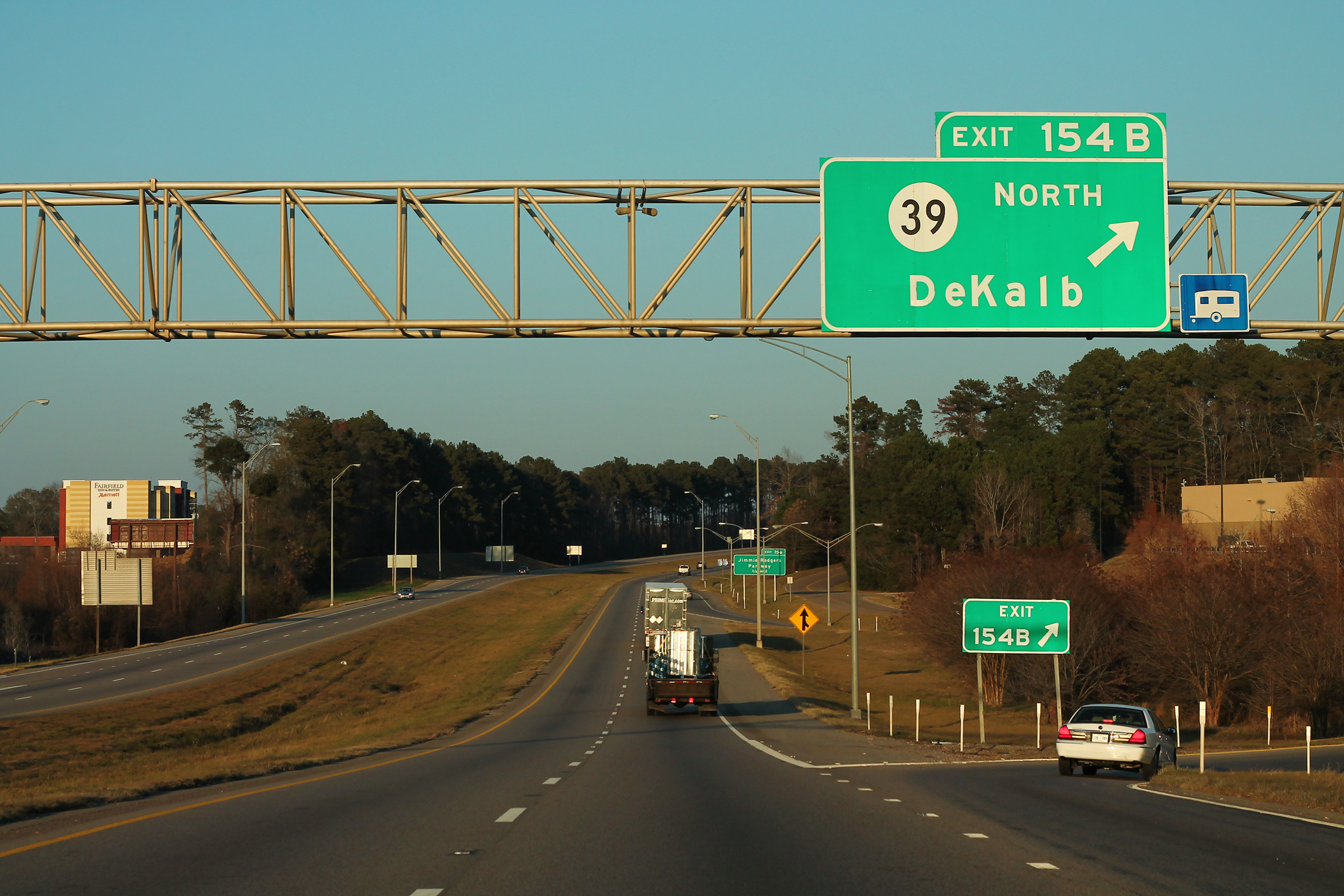
I-20 east/I-59 north at the southern terminus of MS 39 in Meridian (exit 154 A/B)

MS 39 travels through hilly woodlands as it passes through the Blackwater community before entering De Kalb and traveling through neighborhoods as it joins Peach Avenue. The highway makes a sharp left onto Church Street for a block before making a sharp right onto Main Avenue and passing straight through downtown (and directly beside the Kemper County Courthouse). MS 39 leaves downtown and has a short concurrency with MS 16 before leaving De Kalb altogether and traveling through hilly remote woodlands for several miles, where it crosses the Sucarnoochee River before entering Noxubee County.

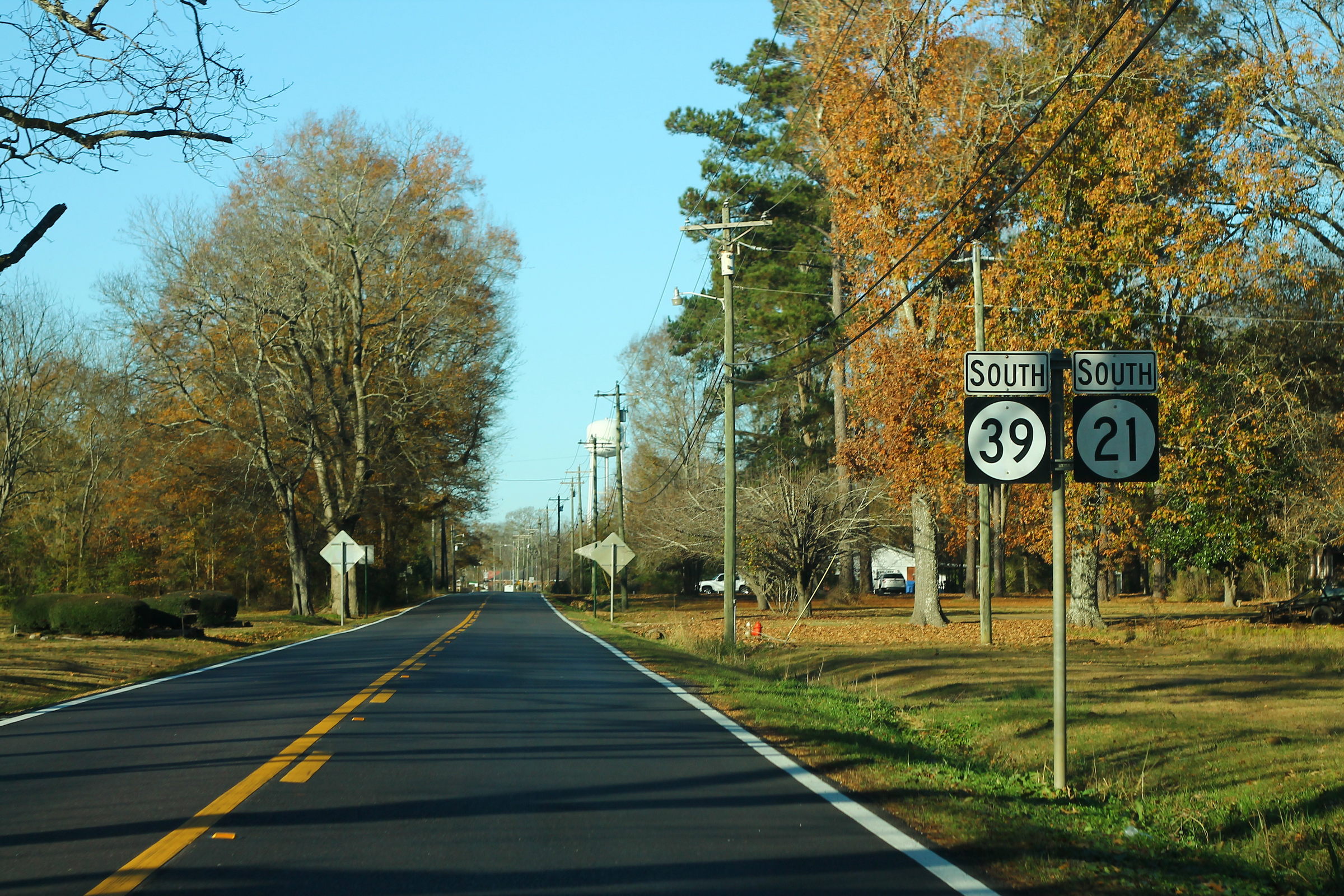
MS 39/MS 21 southbound in Shuqualak

The terrain now flattens out as MS 39 becomes concurrent with MS 21 and enters the town of Shuqualak. MS 21/MS 39 pass straight through the center of town before having an intersection with MS 145, where MS 21 ends, before MS 39 comes to an end at an intersection with US 45.

== Major intersections ==
County	Location	mi	km	Destinations	Notes
Lauderdale	Meridian	0.0	0.0	I-20 / I-59 / US 11 south / US 80 west / MS 19 north – Tuscaloosa, Jackson MS 19 south to US 45 – Butler	Southern terminus; I-20/59 exit 154; southern end of short US 11/US 80 overlap
Lauderdale	Meridian	0.05	0.080	US 11 north / US 80 east (Frontage Road) – Russell, Toomsuba, Cuba	Northern end of short US 11/US 80 overlap
Lauderdale	Meridian	0.4	0.64	Russell Drive	Interchange; former US 11 / US 80
Lauderdale	Meridian	0.7	1.1	Front Street - Downtown Meridian	Former US 45 south
Lauderdale	Meridian	1.1	1.8	Old Highway 45 North (MS 884 north) - Marion	Former US 45 north; southern terminus of unsigned MS 884
Lauderdale	Lizelia	12.6	20.3	MS 854 east (John C. Stennis Drive) – Meridian Naval Air Station, Stennis Center, Meridian Station	Western terminus of MS 854
Kemper	De Kalb	30.3	48.8	MS 16 east – Scooba	Southern end of MS 16 overlap
Kemper	De Kalb	30.5	49.1	MS 16 west – Philadelphia	Northern end of MS 16 overlap
Noxubee		45.4– 45.5	73.1– 73.2	MS 21 south – Philadelphia	South end of MS 21 overlap
Noxubee	Shuqualak	49.5	79.7	MS 145 – Macon, Scooba MS 21 ends	Northern terminus of MS 21
Noxubee		49.7	80.0	US 45 – Columbus, Meridian	Northern terminus
1.000 mi = 1.609 km; 1.000 km = 0.621 mi: Concurrency terminus
