= Meridian Station, Mississippi =

Census-designated place in Lauderdale County, Mississippi, United States

- Census-designated place
- Location of Meridian Station, Mississippi

- Location in the United States
- Coordinates: 32°32′49″N 88°37′19″W
- Country: United States
- State: Mississippi
- County: Lauderdale

Area
  - Total: 1.70 sq mi (4.41 km^{2})
  - Land: 1.66 sq mi (4.29 km^{2})
  - Water: 0.046 sq mi (0.12 km^{2})
- Elevation: 250 ft (76 m)

Population (2020)
  - Total: 581
  - Density: 350.8/sq mi (135.43/km^{2})
- Time zone: UTC-6 (Central (CST))
  - Summer (DST): UTC-5 (CDT)
- ZIP Codes: 39305, 39309
- FIPS code: 28-46680

Meridian Station is a census-designated place (CDP) in Lauderdale County, Mississippi, United States, corresponding to the residential portions of Naval Air Station Meridian. As of the 2020 census, Meridian Station had a population of 581.

== Geography ==
Meridian Station is located in northern Lauderdale County at 32°32′49″N 88°37′19″W (32.547017, -88.621981). It is 17 miles (27 km) north of Meridian, the county seat, via Mississippi Highway 39 and John C. Stennis Drive.

According to the United States Census Bureau, the CDP has a total area of 1.7 square miles (4.5 km^{2}), of which 0.04 square miles (0.1 km^{2}), or 2.69%, are water.

== Demographics ==
Historical population
Census	Pop.	Note	%±
2000	1,849		—
2010	1,090		−41.0%
2020	581		−46.7%
U.S. Decennial Census

As of the census of 2000, there were 1,849 people, 354 households, and 344 families residing in the CDP. The population density was 656.5 inhabitants per square mile (253.5/km^{2}). There were 526 housing units at an average density of 186.8 per square mile (72.1/km^{2}). The racial makeup of the CDP was 62.57% White, 26.55% African American, 0.76% Native American, 2.65% Asian, 0.32% Pacific Islander, 3.79% from other races, and 3.35% from two or more races. Hispanic or Latino of any race were 8.06% of the population.

There were 354 households, out of which 75.4% had children under the age of 18 living with them, 88.1% were married couples living together, 6.5% had a female householder with no husband present, and 2.8% were non-families. 2.5% of all households were made up of individuals, and 0.3% had someone living alone who was 65 years of age or older. The average household size was 3.45 and the average family size was 3.49.

In the CDP, the population was spread out, with 29.1% under the age of 18, 30.4% from 18 to 24, 38.6% from 25 to 44, 1.7% from 45 to 64, and 0.2% who were 65 years of age or older. The median age was 22 years. For every 100 females, there were 137.1 males. For every 100 females age 18 and over, there were 145.0 males.

The median income for a household in the CDP was $42,024, and the median income for a family was $42,173. Males had a median income of $24,348 versus $17,284 for females. The per capita income for the CDP was $12,353. About 5.3% of families and 5.9% of the population were below the poverty line, including 6.0% of those under age 18 and none of those age 65 or over.

== See also ==
- List of census-designated places in Mississippi
