= Lewis McAllister =

American politician (born 1932)

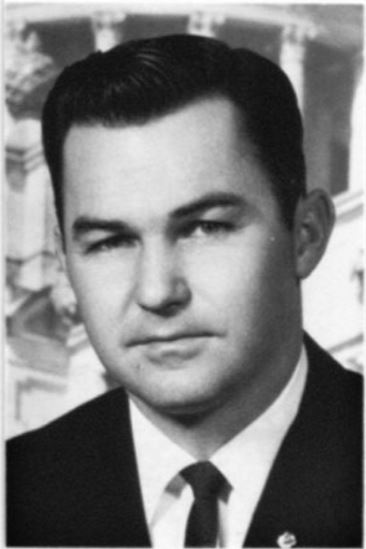
- c. 1964

Member of the Mississippi House of Representatives from the Lauderdale County district
- In office February 25, 1963 – January 1968
- Preceded by: Natie Caraway

Personal details
- Born: September 25, 1932 (age 93) Jackson, Mississippi, U.S.
- Party: Republican
- Education: Meridian High School
- Alma mater: Georgia Tech; University of Alabama

Lewis Leslie "Mack" McAllister, Jr. (born September 25, 1932), is an American politician. He was a Republican member of the Mississippi House of Representatives, representing Lauderdale County, from 1963 to 1968. He was the first Republican in the Mississippi Legislature in 43 years.

== Biography ==
Lewis Leslie McAllister, Jr., was born on September 25, 1932, in Jackson, Mississippi. He was a certified public accountant working in Meridian, Mississippi. His father was a former Democratic Meridian councilman. He is a graduate of Meridian High School and an alumnus of Georgia Tech and the University of Alabama.

In 1960, McAllister was appointed the Lauderdale County campaign manager for the Republican party and engaged in local programming to build GOP support in the area; he later became vice chairman of the county organization. He was also chairman of the Mississippi Young Republicans, starting in 1961. As chairman, he encouraged conservative Democrats to join the organization.

In January 1963, he announced his candidacy as a Republican in a special election to represent Lauderdale County in the Mississippi House of Representatives to replace resigning representative Natie Caraway. He received a plurality of the votes in the general and proceeded to a runoff election, where he was elected with 57% of the vote. McAllister, a self-described Goldwater Republican, was the first member of the Republican Party to serve in the Mississippi Legislature since George L. Sheldon, who served from 1920 to 1924. Notably, he was the second Republican to be elected to public office in the early 1960s, as Joe Sams, Jr., won election as county prosecutor in Lowndes County. McCallister attributed his victory to not because of his party identification but to the "hatred of the Kennedys." He was re-elected to serve the 1964–1968 term.

He announced his candidacy for Mississippi 4th Congressional District in February 1966 when Congressman Prentiss Walker, a fellow Republican, announced a run for the United States Senate. He ultimately lost to Democrat Sonny Montgomery, a major general and businessman, with about 38% of the vote.

== See also ==
- 1963 Mississippi House of Representatives special election in Lauderdale County
