= 1963 Mississippi House of Representatives special election in Lauderdale County =

State election in the US

1963 Mississippi House of Representatives special election, Lauderdale County
- February 5, 1963 (first round); February 19, 1963 (runoff)

Mississippi House of Representatives Lauderdale County
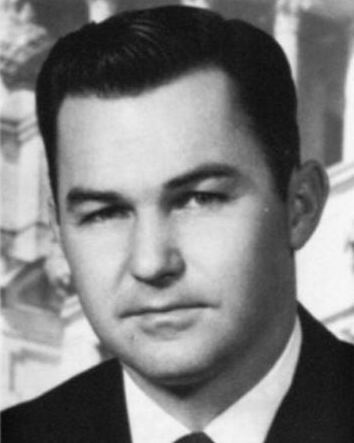

Candidate	Lewis McAllister	Dennis Goldman
Party	Republican	Democratic
Popular vote	3,086	2,298
Percentage	57.32%	42.68%
Representative before election
Natie Caraway
Democratic
Elected Representative
Lewis McAllister
Republican

Lauderdale County in Mississippi held a special election on February 5, 1963, and February 19, 1963, to elect a new member of the Mississippi House of Representatives. The election filled the 11-month remainder of incumbent Democratic representative Natie Caraway's term, who resigned on January 1, 1963, after relocating to Jackson. Lewis McAllister won the seat during the February 19 runoff, flipping the seat to the Republicans. This race gained attention for being the first instance of a Republican being elected to Mississippi's state legislature in forty-three years. McAllister would later run in the November 1963 regular election and win a full term.

The first round was held on the same day as a statewide referendum on reapportionment, marking the first reapportionment of the Mississippi Legislature since 1890.

== First round ==
The special election was triggered when incumbent Democratic representative Natie Caraway announced his resignation in December 1962, effective January 1, 1963. Caraway stated his resignation was caused by his move from Meridian to Jackson to take a job at a law firm. The first round date was set to February 5, 1963, alongside a statewide amendment on reapportionment. Candidates had until January 25 to qualify, requiring 50 signatures to be placed on the ballot.

=== Candidates ===
- Danny Beard (Democratic)
- J.C. Downey (Democratic)
- Ed Frasier (Democratic)
- Dennis Goldman, attorney (Democratic)
- Lewis McAllister, accountant and Mississippi Young Republicans leader (Republican)

=== Results ===
First round results
Party	Candidate	Votes	%
Republican	Lewis McAllister	2,212	46.04%
Democratic	Dennis Goldman	917	19.09%
Democratic	3 others	1,675	34.87%
Total votes		4,804	100.00%

== Runoff ==
After the first round, Democratic candidates Beard, Downey, and Frasier were eliminated, with McAllister and Goldman advancing to the runoff. The three former candidates collectively endorsed second-place Democratic candidate Dennis Goldman, stating "in the interest of unity and harmony in our city and state, we the undersigned candidates, do hereby endorse our fellow Democrat, Dennis Goldman for representative inside the city, and hereby urge all our supporters to work and vote for Goldman." While campaigning, McAllister branded himself as a "Goldwater Republican".

=== Results ===
Runoff results
Party	Candidate	Votes	%
Republican	Lewis McAllister	3,086	57.32%
Democratic	Dennis Goldman	2,298	42.68%
Total votes		5,384	100.00%

== Aftermath ==
Immediately after the runoff, Bidwell Adam, former lieutenant governor and chair of the state Democratic Party, attributed McAllister's election to the Kennedy family, as part of an effort to destroy the Mississippi Democratic Party, stating "no one contributed more to the defeat of Mr. Goldman than did Mr. Robert Kennedy." Adam claimed that the Kennedy administration had "followed the pattern at Oxford Miss., that was set by Mr. Eisenhower in Little Rock," and the "national administration in Washington is determined to destroy the State Democratic organization and the last vestiges of states' rights."

Chairman of the state Republican Party, Wirt Yerger, stated that "highly qualified and capable candidates who are opposed to the Kennedy and the Democratic party can win elections as full-fledged Republicans." On his election, Lewis McAllister claimed "this is an indication of a trend towards a two-party state and a two-party South." McAllister was the first Republican in forty-three years to win election to the state house. The last to do so was former governor of Nebraska George L. Sheldon from Washington County, who served from 1920 to 1924. At the time of McAllister's election, the only other Republican holding public office in Mississippi was Joe Sams Jr., the attorney of Lowndes County. McAllister was sworn in on February 25, 1963.
