= Savoy, Mississippi =

- Unincorporated community
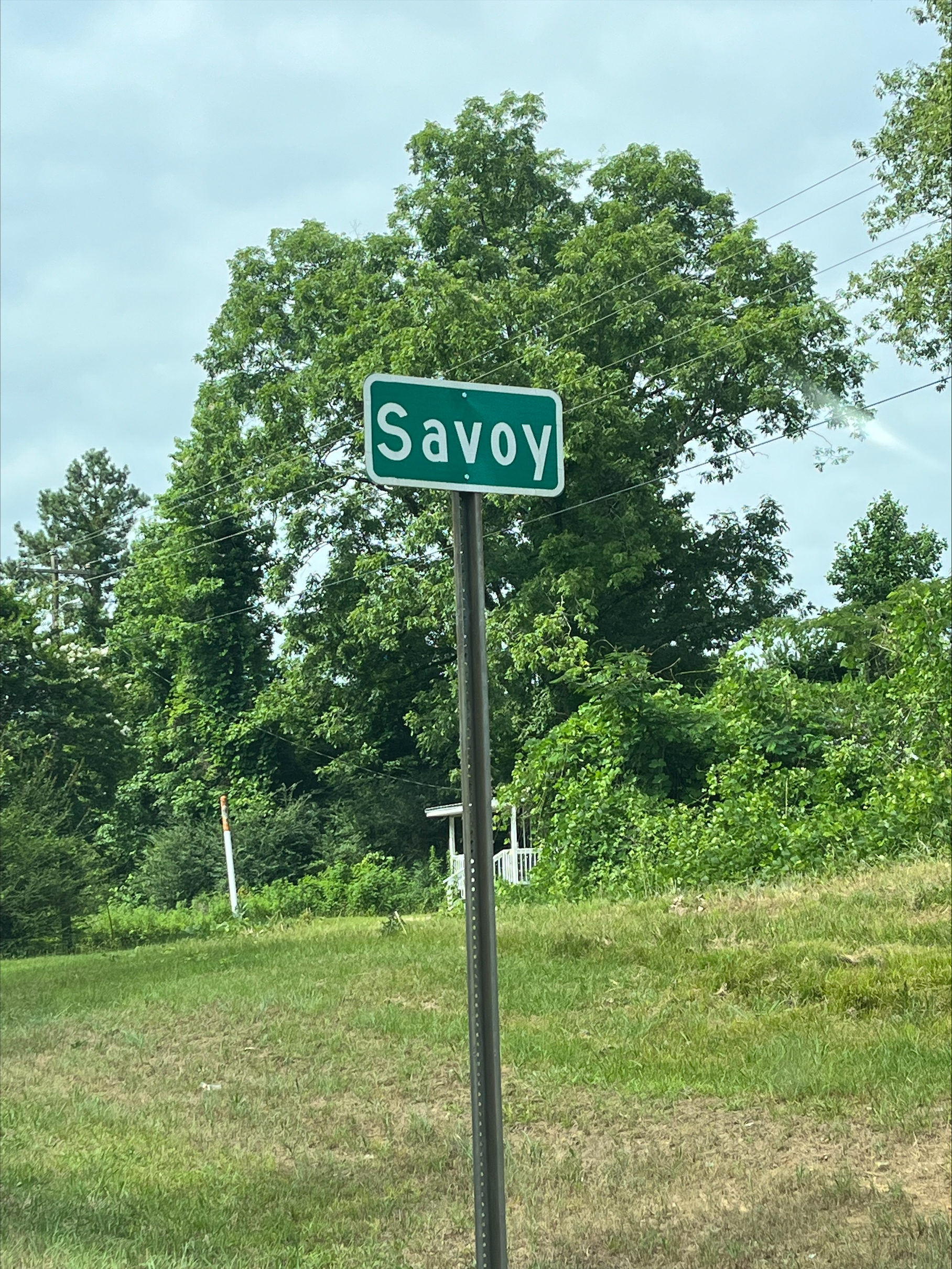

- Location within Mississippi Location within the United States
- Coordinates: 32°16′15″N 88°46′11″W
- Country: United States
- State: Mississippi
- County: Lauderdale
- Elevation: 282 ft (86 m)
- Time zone: UTC-6 (Central (CST))
  - Summer (DST): UTC-5 (CDT)
- ZIP code: 39307
- Area codes: 601 & 769
- GNIS feature ID: 677444

Savoy is an unincorporated community in Lauderdale County, Mississippi, United States. Its ZIP code is 39307.

== History ==
Located seven miles southwest of Meridian, Mississippi, Savoy was first established sometime in 1883 under the name of Corrine as a right of way on the New Orleans and Northeastern Railroad. In 1896, the name was shortened to Corry, and finally to Savoy in 1903. The railroad had a passing siding and house track here at one point. A post office was established here in 1900 before being abolished in 1913.
