= Lizelia, Mississippi =

- Unincorporated community
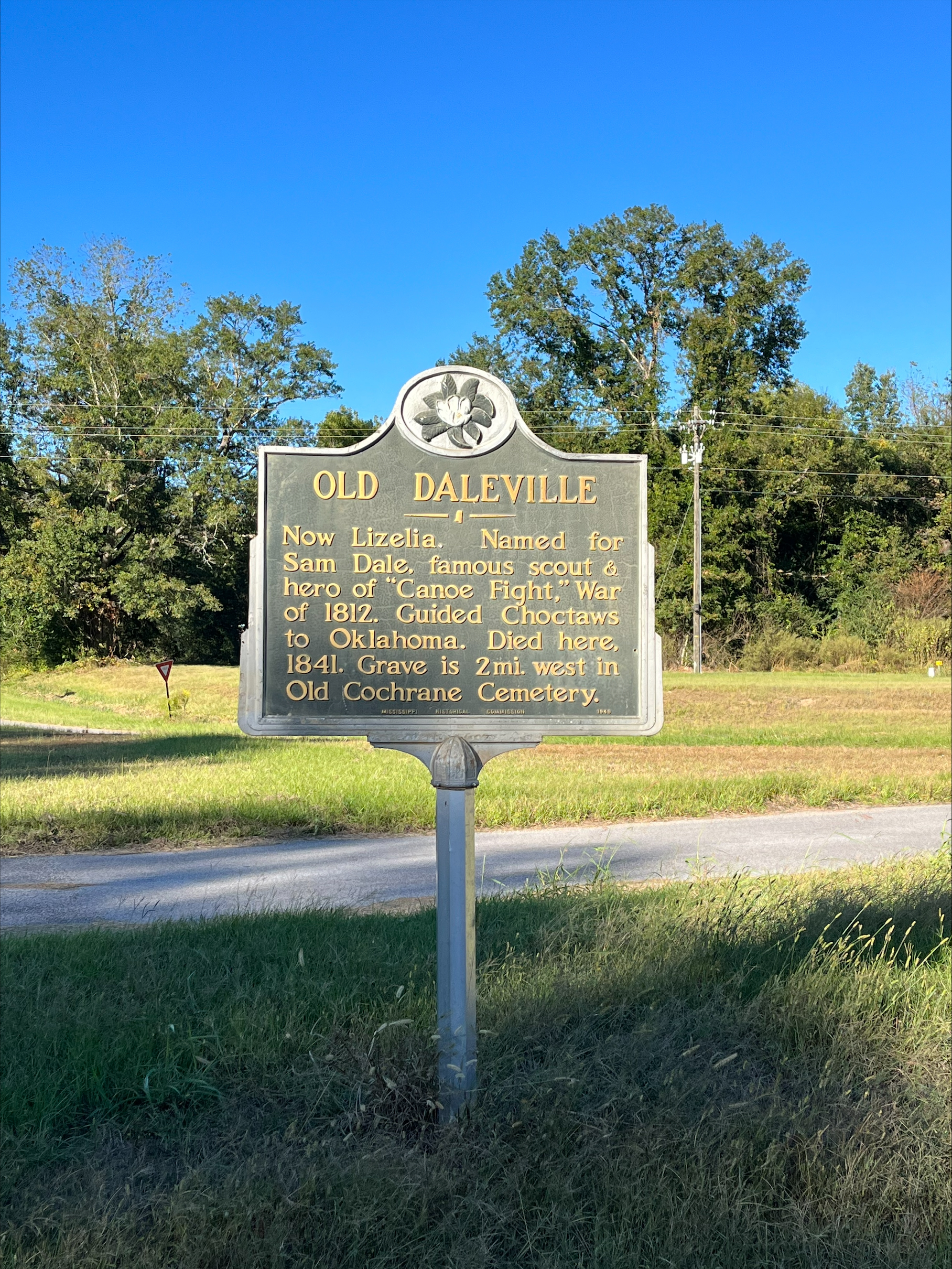
- Historical marker in Lizelia

- Location within Mississippi Location within the United States
- Coordinates: 32°32′09″N 88°39′36″W
- Country: United States
- State: Mississippi
- County: Lauderdale
- Elevation: 292 ft (89 m)
- Time zone: UTC-6 (Central (CST))
  - Summer (DST): UTC-5 (CDT)
- Area codes: 601 & 769
- GNIS feature ID: 692008

Lizelia is an unincorporated community in Lauderdale County, Mississippi, United States. Lizelia is located along Mississippi Highway 39 12 miles (19 km) north of Meridian. Lizelia is located on Ponta Creek and is the former site of old Daleville. A post office operated under the name Lizelia from 1886 to 1911.
