= Nellieburg, Mississippi =

- Census-designated place
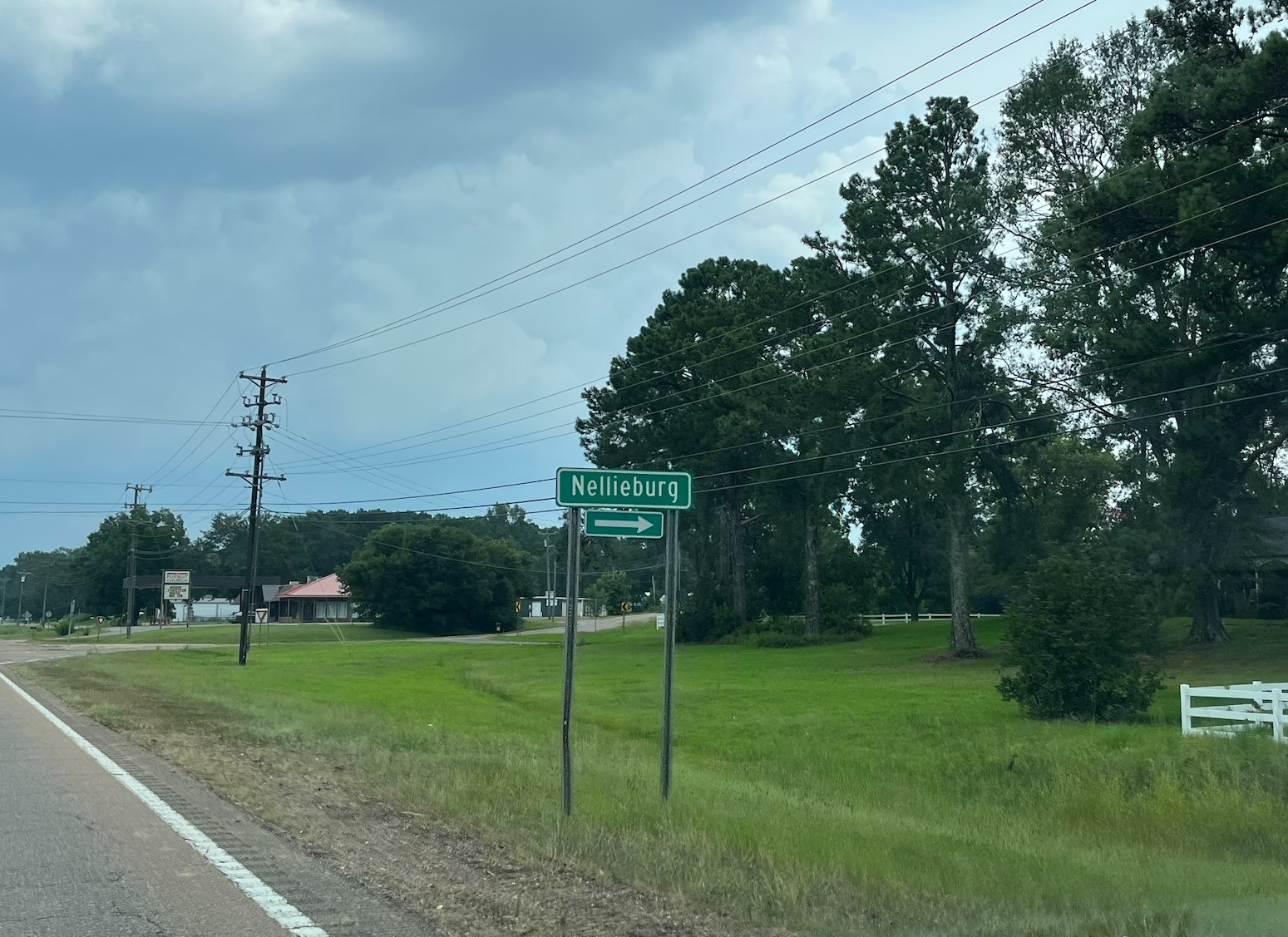

- Location of Nellieburg, Mississippi

- Location in the United States
- Coordinates: 32°24′7″N 88°46′28″W
- Country: United States
- State: Mississippi
- County: Lauderdale

Area
  - Total: 7.14 sq mi (18.48 km^{2})
  - Land: 7.10 sq mi (18.38 km^{2})
  - Water: 0.039 sq mi (0.10 km^{2})
- Elevation: 341 ft (104 m)

Population (2020)
  - Total: 1,316
  - Density: 185.5/sq mi (71.61/km^{2})
- Time zone: UTC-6 (Central (CST))
  - Summer (DST): UTC-5 (CDT)
- FIPS code: 28-50720
- GNIS feature ID: 0674548

Nellieburg is an unincorporated community and census-designated place (CDP) in Lauderdale County, Mississippi, United States. The population was 1,316 at the 2020 census. It is a suburb of Meridian.

== Geography ==
Nellieburg is bordered to the east by Okatibbee Creek, a south-flowing tributary of the Chickasawhay River and part of the Pascagoula River watershed. It is 6 miles (10 km) northwest of the center of Meridian, the county seat, via Mississippi Highway 19. The highway continues northwest 33 miles (53 km) to Philadelphia.

According to the United States Census Bureau, the Nellieburg CDP has a total area of 7.1 square miles (18.5 km^{2}), of which 0.04 square miles (0.1 km^{2}), or 0.53%, are water.

== Demographics ==
Historical population
Census	Pop.	Note	%±
2020	1,316		—
U.S. Decennial Census

Nellieburg racial composition as of 2020 (NH = Non-Hispanic) (Note: Note: the US Census treats Hispanic/Latino as an ethnic category. This table excludes Latinos from the racial categories and assigns them to a separate category. Hispanics/Latinos can be of any race.)
Race	Number	Percentage
White (NH)	891	67.71%
Black or African American (NH)	345	26.22%
Native American or Alaska Native (NH)	3	0.23%
Asian (NH)	8	0.61%
Some Other Race (NH)	3	0.23%
Mixed/Multi-Racial (NH)	48	3.65%
Hispanic or Latino	18	1.37%
Total	1,316	

As of the 2020 United States census, there were 1,316 people, 425 households, and 347 families residing in the CDP.

As of the census of 2000, there were 1,354 people, 561 households, and 407 families residing in the CDP. The population density was 103.9 inhabitants per square mile (40.1/km^{2}). There were 580 housing units at an average density of 44.5 units per square mile (17.2 units/km^{2}). The racial makeup of the CDP was 84.19% White, 13.74% African American, 0.15% Native American, 0.96% Asian, 0.74% from other races, and 0.22% from two or more races. Hispanic or Latino of any race were 1.03% of the population.

There were 561 households, out of which 29.8% had children under the age of 18 living with them, 61.3% were married couples living together, 8.4% had a female householder with no husband present, and 27.3% were non-families. 23.5% of all households were made up of individuals, and 9.3% had someone living alone who was 65 years of age or older. The average household size was 2.41 and the average family size was 2.86.

In the CDP, the population was spread out, with 21.9% under the age of 18, 8.3% from 18 to 24, 26.2% from 25 to 44, 29.2% from 45 to 64, and 14.3% who were 65 years of age or older. The median age was 41 years. For every 100 females, there were 99.7 males. For every 100 females age 18 and over, there were 98.9 males.

The median income for a household in the CDP was $38,553, and the median income for a family was $48,816. Males had a median income of $35,479 versus $30,972 for females. The per capita income for the CDP was $18,266. About 11.4% of families and 14.1% of the population were below the poverty line, including 29.4% of those under age 18 and 3.8% of those age 65 or over.
