= Meehan, Mississippi =

- Unincorporated community
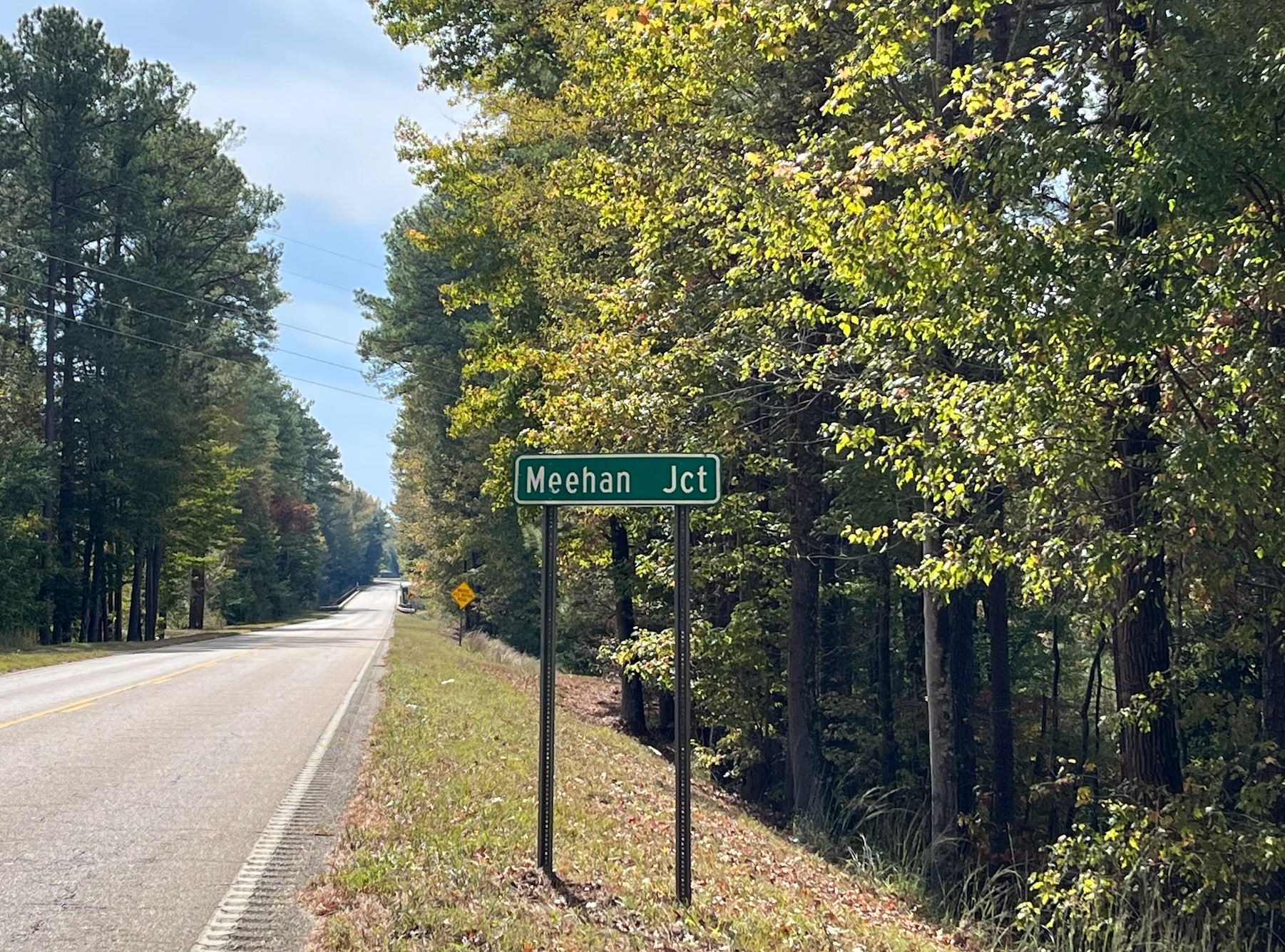
- Sign for Meehan

- Location within Mississippi Location within the United States
- Coordinates: 32°19′42″N 88°51′59″W
- Country: United States
- State: Mississippi
- County: Lauderdale
- Established: 1889
- Elevation: 338 ft (103 m)
- Time zone: UTC-6 (Central (CST))
  - Summer (DST): UTC-5 (CDT)
- ZIP code: 39307
- Area codes: 601 & 769
- GNIS feature ID: 673459

Meehan, also known as Meehan Junction, is an unincorporated community in Lauderdale County, Mississippi, United States. The community was located at the crossing of the former Alabama & Vicksburg Railroad and the Tallahatta Railway.

== History ==
The Meehan-Rounds Lumber Company once operated a sawmill in Meehan. In 1919, J.F. Craig of Indianola, Mississippi purchased 26,000 acres, including the site of Meehan. Much of the land was cut over due to previous logging activity, but Craig planned on using the community to house his tenant farmers. Craig purchased the land with the intention of raising cattle on it and using the remaining small timber as railroad ties.

A post office operated under the name Siding from 1889 to 1902, Meehan Junction from 1902 to 1950, and Meehan from 1950 to 1958.

== Gallery ==
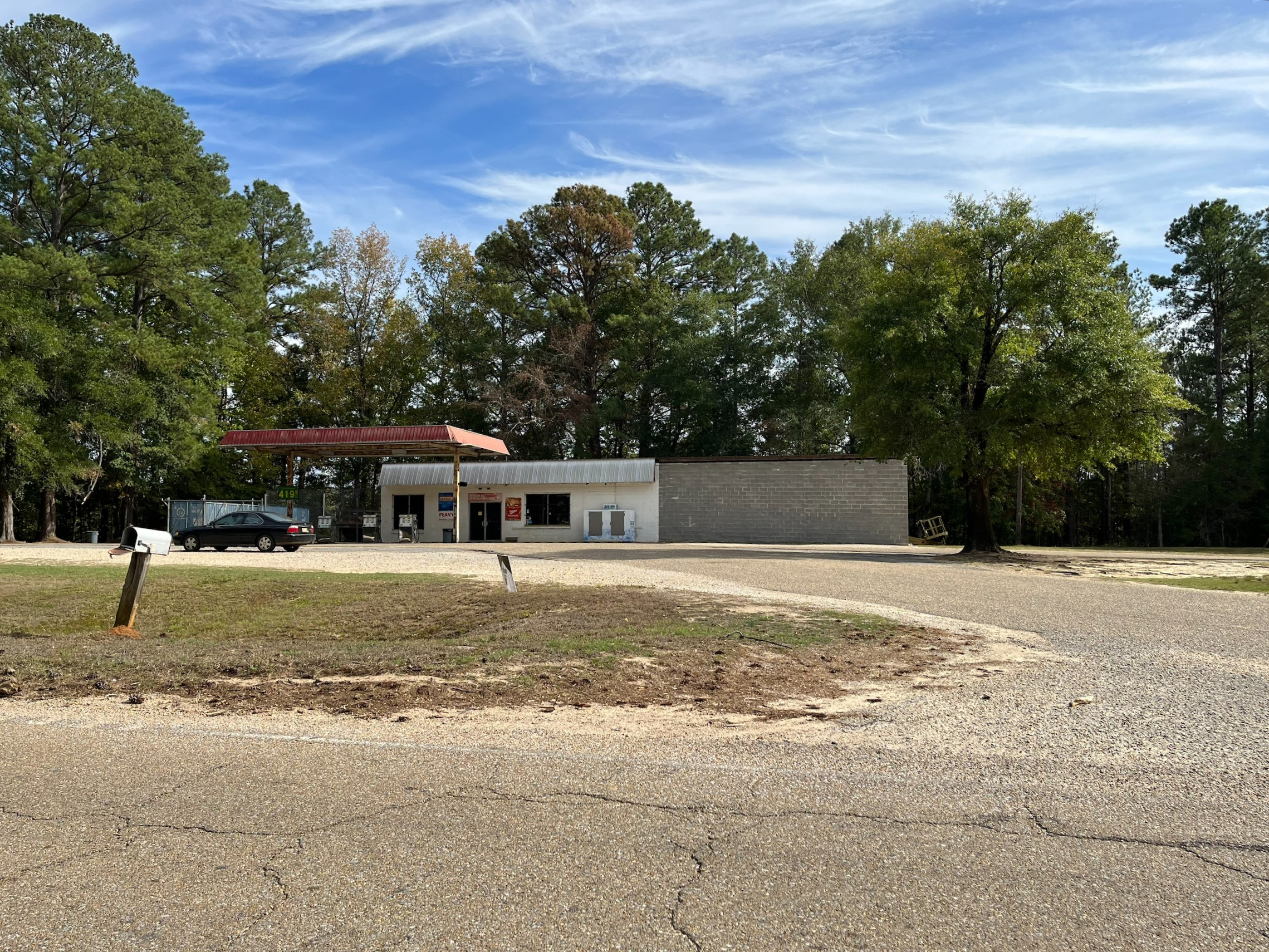
Store in Meehan

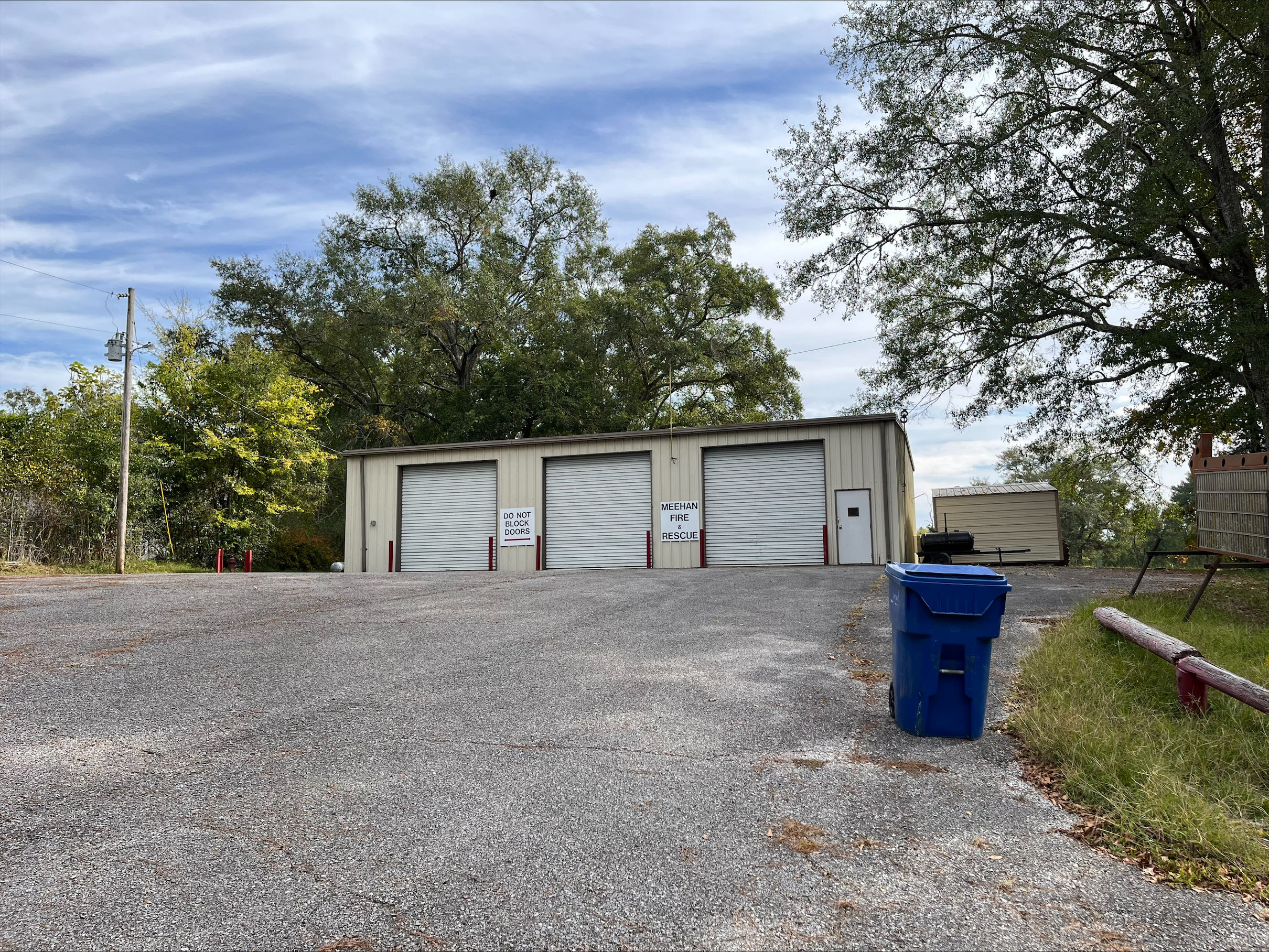
Meehan Volunteer Fire Department
