= Point, Mississippi =

- Unincorporated community
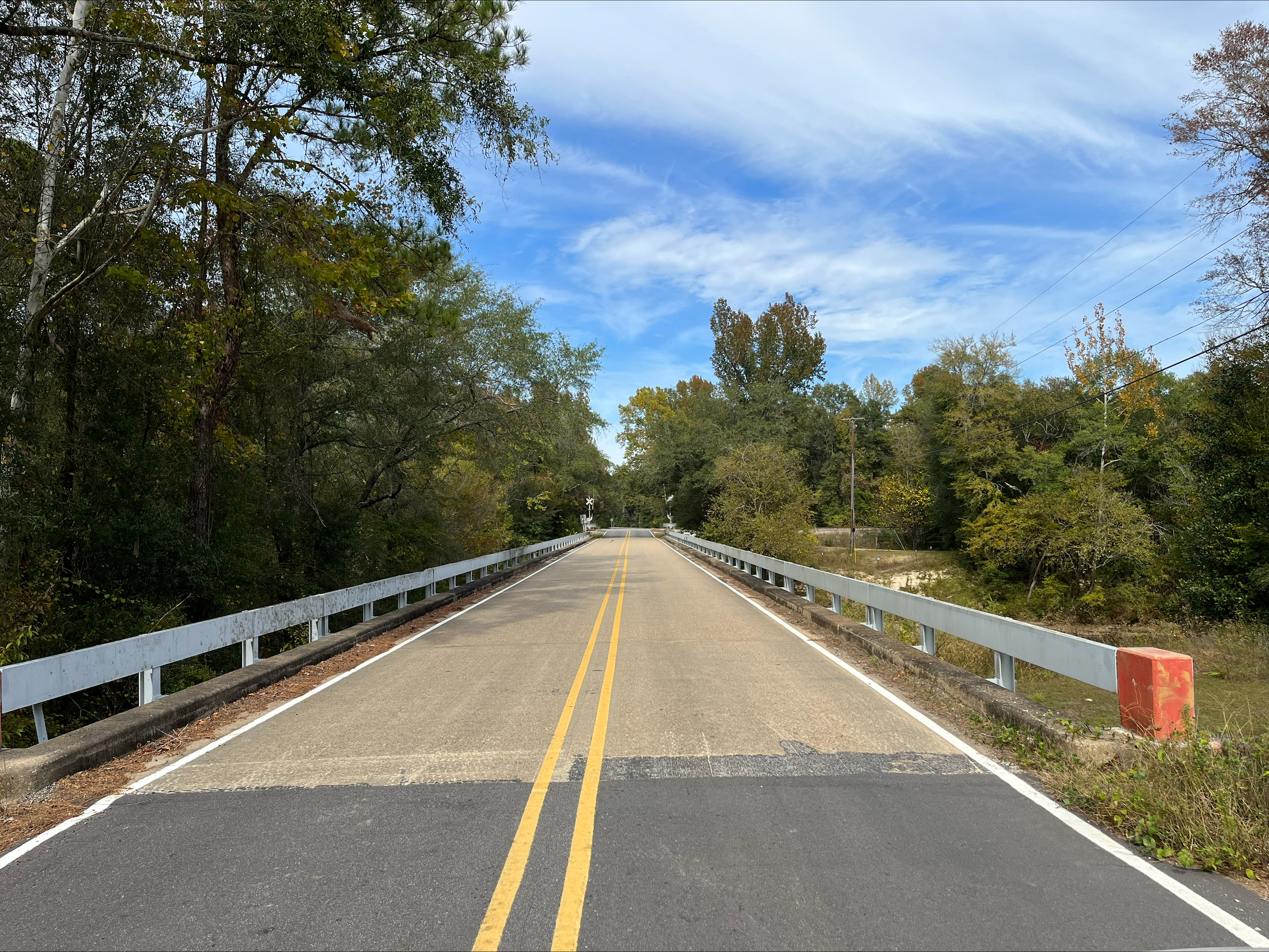
- Bridge over Chunky River with Kansas City Southern crossing in the background in Point, Mississippi

- Location within Mississippi Location within the United States
- Coordinates: 32°18′41″N 88°53′26″W
- Country: United States
- State: Mississippi
- County: Lauderdale
- Elevation: 276 ft (84 m)
- Time zone: UTC-6 (Central (CST))
  - Summer (DST): UTC-5 (CDT)
- ZIP code: 39320
- Area codes: 601 & 769
- GNIS feature ID: 676166

Point is an unincorporated community in Lauderdale County, Mississippi, United States. Its ZIP code is 39323.

== History ==
Initially established sometime prior to 1891 as a flagstop and freight station on the Illinois Central Railroad, the community was known as Lacey until September 1895, when a post office was established at the place by Samuel H. Wilson. The community had a depot, water tank, post office, house track, school, and a siding track. The population was 27 in 1900. The post office was abolished in March 1907.
