= Ponta Creek =

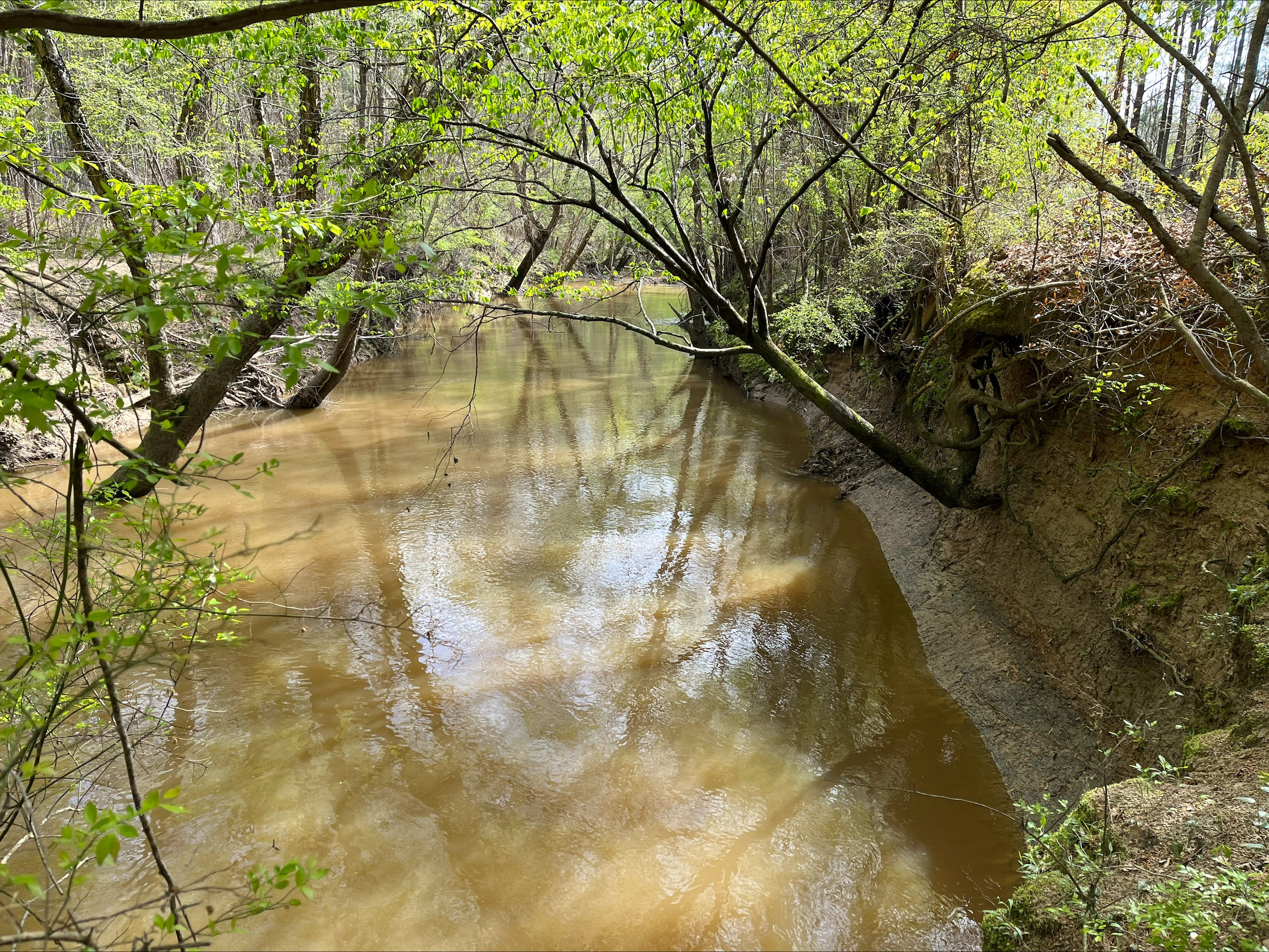
- Ponta Creek after a rain

Location
- Country: United States
- State: Alabama and Mississippi

Physical characteristics
- Source
  - coordinates: 32.575338°N 88.695623°W
- Mouth
  - coordinates: 32.611829°N 88.364464°W
- Length: 23.5 mi (37.8 km)
- Basin size: 64.6 mi^{2} (167 km^{2})

Ponta Creek is a stream in the U.S. states of Alabama and Mississippi. It is a tributary to the Sucarnoochee River. Tributaries include Lost Horse Creek, Possum Creek, and Big Creek.

Ponta is a name derived from the Choctaw language purported to mean "mouse". Variant names are "Panthe Creek" and "Ponti Creek".

The Choctaw settlement of Coosha was located on Ponta Creek. One of the three main divisions of the Choctaw tribe, the Eastern Division, lived in the area around Ponta Creek. In 1795, 99 Choctaw lived in the village of Pante on Ponta Creek, with Hochinchimastabe serving as the village captain.
