= Lauderdale County, Mississippi =

County in Mississippi, United States

- County
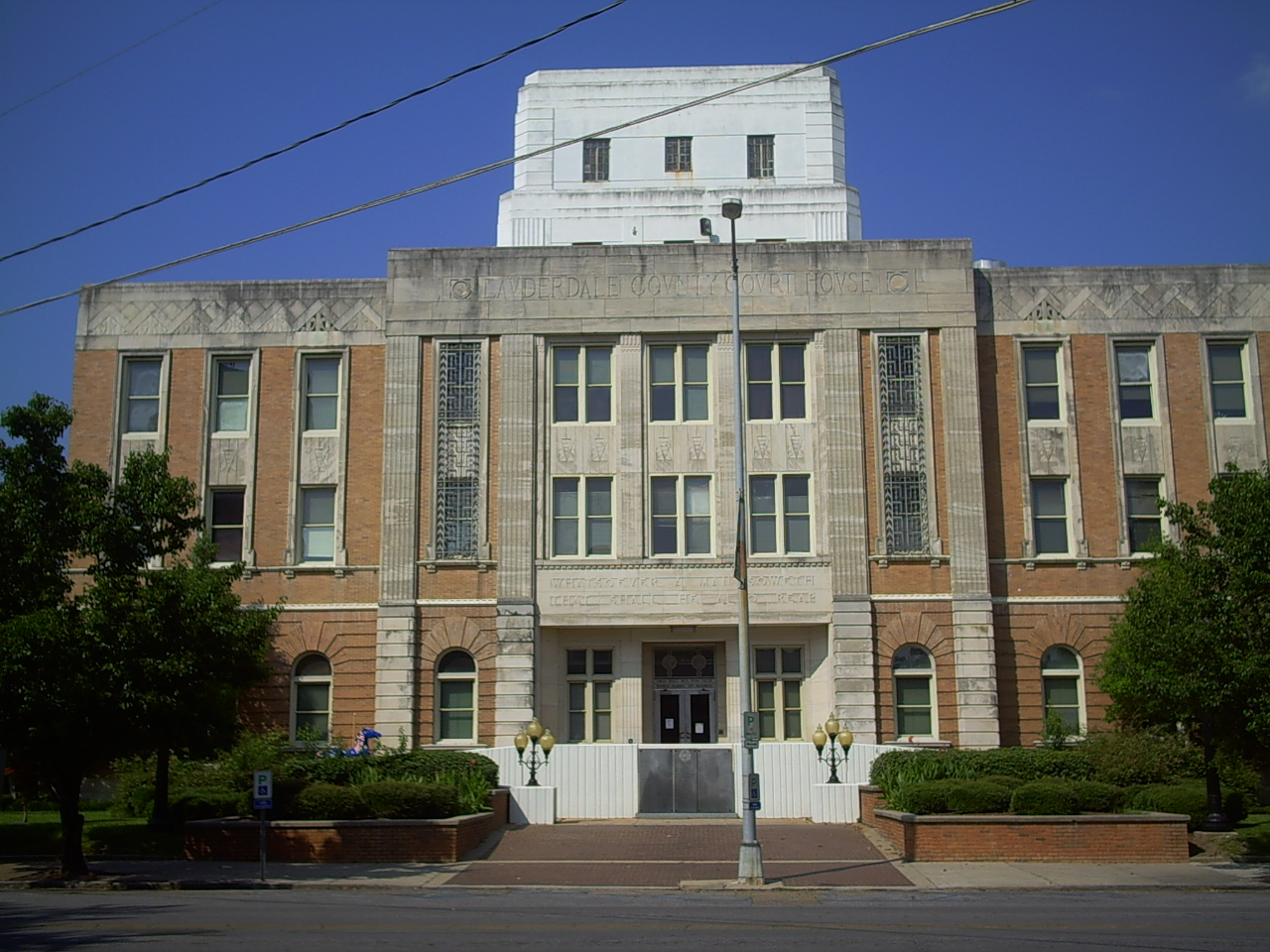
- Lauderdale County Courthouse

- Location within the U.S. state of Mississippi
- Coordinates: 32°24′N 88°40′W
- Country: United States
- State: Mississippi
- Founded: 1833
- Named for: James Lauderdale
- Seat: Meridian
- Largest city: Meridian

Area
  - Total: 715 sq mi (1,850 km^{2})
  - Land: 704 sq mi (1,820 km^{2})
  - Water: 12 sq mi (31 km^{2}) 1.6%

Population (2020)
  - Total: 72,984
  - Estimate (2025): 70,317 ▼
  - Density: 104/sq mi (40.0/km^{2})
- Time zone: UTC−6 (Central)
  - Summer (DST): UTC−5 (CDT)
- Congressional district: 3rd
- Website: lauderdalecounty.org

Lauderdale County is a county located on the eastern border of the U.S. state of Mississippi. As of the 2020 census, the population was 72,984. The county seat and largest city is Meridian. The county is named for Colonel James Lauderdale, who was killed at the Battle of New Orleans in the War of 1812. Lauderdale County is included in the Meridian, MS Micropolitan Statistical Area.

== History ==
An early explorer, Sam Dale, died in the county and is buried in Daleville. A large monument is placed at his burial site. Andrew Jackson traveled through the county on his way to New Orleans and a town was named Hickory after his nickname "Old Hickory".

The largest city in the county is Meridian, which was an important railway intersection during the early 20th century. It was also home to the Soule Steam Feed Works which manufactured steam engines. Logging and rail transport were important early industries in the county. One of the largest waterfalls in Mississippi, Dunns Falls, is located in the county and a water driven mill still exists on the site. Lauderdale County is home to the headquarters of Peavey Electronics which has manufactured audio and music equipment since 1965.

Like much of the post-Reconstruction South the county has a checkered racial history with 16 documented lynchings in the period from 1877 to 1950; most of them happened around the turn of the 20th century.

== Geography ==
According to the U.S. Census Bureau, the county has a total area of 715 square miles (1,850 km^{2}), of which 704 square miles (1,820 km^{2}) is land and 12 square miles (31 km^{2}) (1.6%) is water.

=== Major highways ===
- Interstate 59
- Interstate 20
- U.S. Highway 11
- U.S. Highway 45
- U.S. Highway 80
- Mississippi Highway 19
- Mississippi Highway 39

=== Adjacent counties ===
- Kemper County (north)
- Sumter County, Alabama (east)
- Choctaw County, Alabama (southeast)
- Clarke County (south)
- Newton County (west)

== Demographics ==
Historical population
| Census | Pop. | Note | %± |
|---|---|---|---|
| 1840 | 5,358 | | — |
| 1850 | 8,717 | | 62.7% |
| 1860 | 13,313 | | 52.7% |
| 1870 | 13,462 | | 1.1% |
| 1880 | 21,501 | | 59.7% |
| 1890 | 29,661 | | 38.0% |
| 1900 | 38,150 | | 28.6% |
| 1910 | 46,919 | | 23.0% |
| 1920 | 45,897 | | −2.2% |
| 1930 | 52,748 | | 14.9% |
| 1940 | 58,247 | | 10.4% |
| 1950 | 64,171 | | 10.2% |
| 1960 | 67,119 | | 4.6% |
| 1970 | 67,087 | | 0.0% |
| 1980 | 77,285 | | 15.2% |
| 1990 | 75,555 | | −2.2% |
| 2000 | 78,161 | | 3.4% |
| 2010 | 80,261 | | 2.7% |
| 2020 | 72,984 | | −9.1% |
| 2025 (est.) | 70,317 | ▼ | −3.7% |
U.S. Decennial Census; 1790-1960 1900-1990; 1990-2000 2010-2013

=== Racial and ethnic composition ===
Lauderdale County, Mississippi – Racial and ethnic composition Note: the US Census treats Hispanic/Latino as an ethnic category. This table excludes Latinos from the racial categories and assigns them to a separate category. Hispanics/Latinos may be of any race.
| Race / Ethnicity (NH = Non-Hispanic) | Pop 1980 | Pop 1990 | Pop 2000 | Pop 2010 | Pop 2020 | % 1980 | % 1990 | % 2000 | % 2010 | % 2020 |
|---|---|---|---|---|---|---|---|---|---|---|
| White alone (NH) | 52,041 | 48,444 | 46,587 | 43,312 | 36,534 | 67.34% | 64.12% | 59.60% | 53.96% | 50.06% |
| Black or African American alone (NH) | 24,008 | 26,204 | 29,706 | 34,158 | 31,980 | 31.06% | 34.68% | 38.01% | 42.56% | 43.82% |
| Native American or Alaska Native alone (NH) | 82 | 92 | 127 | 140 | 101 | 0.11% | 0.12% | 0.16% | 0.17% | 0.14% |
| Asian alone (NH) | 389 | 299 | 385 | 569 | 571 | 0.50% | 0.40% | 0.49% | 0.71% | 0.78% |
| Native Hawaiian or Pacific Islander alone (NH) | x | x | 21 | 17 | 28 | x | x | 0.03% | 0.02% | 0.04% |
| Other race alone (NH) | 51 | 15 | 31 | 66 | 217 | 0.07% | 0.02% | 0.04% | 0.08% | 0.30% |
| Mixed race or Multiracial (NH) | x | x | 416 | 551 | 1,764 | x | x | 0.53% | 0.69% | 2.42% |
| Hispanic or Latino (any race) | 714 | 501 | 888 | 1,448 | 1,789 | 0.92% | 0.66% | 1.14% | 1.80% | 2.45% |
| Total | 77,285 | 75,555 | 78,161 | 80,261 | 72,984 | 100.00% | 100.00% | 100.00% | 100.00% | 100.00% |

=== 2020 census ===
As of the 2020 census, the county had a population of 72,984. The median age was 39.4 years. 23.8% of residents were under the age of 18 and 18.1% of residents were 65 years of age or older. For every 100 females there were 92.6 males, and for every 100 females age 18 and over there were 89.8 males age 18 and over.

The racial makeup of the county was 50.6% White, 44.0% Black or African American, 0.2% American Indian and Alaska Native, 0.8% Asian, <0.1% Native Hawaiian and Pacific Islander, 1.4% from some other race, and 3.0% from two or more races. Hispanic or Latino residents of any race comprised 2.5% of the population.

46.3% of residents lived in urban areas, while 53.7% lived in rural areas.

There were 29,389 households in the county, of which 30.9% had children under the age of 18 living in them. Of all households, 38.0% were married-couple households, 19.9% were households with a male householder and no spouse or partner present, and 37.0% were households with a female householder and no spouse or partner present. About 32.4% of all households were made up of individuals and 13.6% had someone living alone who was 65 years of age or older.

There were 33,462 housing units, of which 12.2% were vacant. Among occupied housing units, 62.8% were owner-occupied and 37.2% were renter-occupied. The homeowner vacancy rate was 1.9% and the rental vacancy rate was 9.2%.

=== 2000 census ===
As of the census of 2000, there were 78,161 people, 29,990 households, and 20,573 families residing in the county. The population density was 111 inhabitants per square mile (43/km^{2}). There were 33,418 housing units at an average density of 48 per square mile (19/km^{2}). The racial makeup of the county was 60.15% White, 38.18% Black or African American, 0.18% Native American, 0.50% Asian, 0.03% Pacific Islander, 0.34% from other races, and 0.63% from two or more races. 1.14% of the population were Hispanic or Latino of any race.

There were 29,990 households, out of which 33.90% had children under the age of 18 living with them, 46.70% were married couples living together, 18.30% had a female householder with no husband present, and 31.40% were non-families. 28.00% of all households were made up of individuals, and 11.70% had someone living alone who was 65 years of age or older. The average household size was 2.49 and the average family size was 3.06.

In the county, the population was spread out, with 26.60% under the age of 18, 9.80% from 18 to 24, 28.00% from 25 to 44, 21.40% from 45 to 64, and 14.20% who were 65 years of age or older. The median age was 35 years. For every 100 females there were 90.60 males. For every 100 females age 18 and over, there were 85.50 males. The median income for a household in the county was $30,768, and the median income for a family was $37,581. Males had a median income of $31,069 versus $21,111 for females. The per capita income for the county was $16,026. About 17.10% of families and 20.80% of the population were below the poverty line, including 28.80% of those under age 18 and 18.80% of those age 65 or over.

=== 2015 ===
As of 2015 the largest self-identified ancestry groups in Lauderdale County, Mississippi are:

- English - 9.3%
- Irish - 8.9%
- American - 8.0%
- German - 5.9%
- Scottish - 2.1%
- Scots-Irish - 1.7%
- Italian - 1.2%
- French (except Basque) - 1.1%
- French-Canadian - 0.6%

== Government and infrastructure ==
The East Mississippi Correctional Facility is located in an unincorporated area of the county, near Meridian. Intended to provide intensive treatment for up to 1500 state prisoners who are mentally ill, it has been operated since 2012 by Management and Training Corporation under contract to the Mississippi Department of Corrections. In 2013 the ACLU and Southern Poverty Law Center filed a class-action suit against the state and MTC for poor conditions at the facility. The court granted the plaintiffs class certification in 2015, allowing the case to proceed. The former for-profit contractor, GEO Group, was forced out of its contracts for this and two other state facilities in 2012 as a result of settlement of a class-action suit for its poor management of the Walnut Grove Youth Correctional Facility.

== Politics ==
Lauderdale County is a Republican stronghold, having seen a shift from the Democratic Party in the 1960s like much of Mississippi in general. This is true despite nearly half of the county's population being African American.

United States presidential election results for Lauderdale County, Mississippi
| Year | Republican | | Democratic | | Third party(ies) | |
| Year | No. | % | No. | % | No. | % |
|---|---|---|---|---|---|---|
| 1912 | 50 | 2.05% | 2,204 | 90.33% | 186 | 7.62% |
| 1916 | 157 | 4.76% | 3,058 | 92.67% | 85 | 2.58% |
| 1920 | 228 | 7.88% | 2,539 | 87.76% | 126 | 4.36% |
| 1924 | 320 | 7.78% | 3,204 | 77.90% | 589 | 14.32% |
| 1928 | 1,798 | 33.57% | 3,558 | 66.43% | 0 | 0.00% |
| 1932 | 191 | 3.79% | 4,830 | 95.85% | 18 | 0.36% |
| 1936 | 67 | 1.09% | 6,075 | 98.72% | 12 | 0.19% |
| 1940 | 303 | 4.85% | 5,936 | 95.04% | 7 | 0.11% |
| 1944 | 379 | 5.91% | 6,036 | 94.09% | 0 | 0.00% |
| 1948 | 171 | 2.81% | 578 | 9.51% | 5,330 | 87.68% |
| 1952 | 4,137 | 41.46% | 5,841 | 58.54% | 0 | 0.00% |
| 1956 | 2,817 | 30.86% | 5,414 | 59.32% | 896 | 9.82% |
| 1960 | 2,836 | 26.39% | 3,755 | 34.95% | 4,154 | 38.66% |
| 1964 | 13,291 | 89.36% | 1,583 | 10.64% | 0 | 0.00% |
| 1968 | 2,328 | 11.43% | 3,195 | 15.69% | 14,842 | 72.88% |
| 1972 | 18,337 | 81.79% | 3,453 | 15.40% | 630 | 2.81% |
| 1976 | 14,273 | 58.39% | 9,813 | 40.14% | 360 | 1.47% |
| 1980 | 14,727 | 56.38% | 9,918 | 37.97% | 1,474 | 5.64% |
| 1984 | 18,807 | 69.00% | 7,534 | 27.64% | 916 | 3.36% |
| 1988 | 18,302 | 68.99% | 7,967 | 30.03% | 260 | 0.98% |
| 1992 | 17,098 | 62.25% | 8,489 | 30.91% | 1,879 | 6.84% |
| 1996 | 15,055 | 60.62% | 8,668 | 34.90% | 1,111 | 4.47% |
| 2000 | 17,315 | 66.67% | 8,412 | 32.39% | 243 | 0.94% |
| 2004 | 19,736 | 65.42% | 10,292 | 34.12% | 138 | 0.46% |
| 2008 | 19,582 | 59.14% | 13,332 | 40.26% | 200 | 0.60% |
| 2012 | 18,700 | 57.05% | 13,814 | 42.15% | 263 | 0.80% |
| 2016 | 17,741 | 60.13% | 11,269 | 38.19% | 496 | 1.68% |
| 2020 | 17,967 | 57.50% | 12,960 | 41.48% | 320 | 1.02% |
| 2024 | 16,487 | 60.16% | 10,677 | 38.96% | 243 | 0.89% |

== Education ==
Lauderdale County is within the service area of the Meridian Community College system. Other academic institutions are East Mississippi Community College, and Mississippi State University Meridian Campus.

== Communities ==
=== City ===
- Meridian (county seat and largest municipality)

=== Town ===
- Marion (smallest municipality)

=== Unincorporated areas ===
==== Census-designated places ====
- Collinsville
- Lauderdale
- Meridian Station
- Nellieburg
- Toomsuba

==== Other communities ====
- Alamucha
- Bailey
- Daleville
- Increase
- Kewanee
- Lizelia
- Meehan
- Point
- Russell
- Savoy
- Suqualena
- Whynot
- Zero

== Notable people ==
- Samuel Dale (1772–1841), American frontiersman, known as the "Daniel Boone of Alabama" and a veteran of the Creek War of 1813–14. In 1836, Dale was elected as Lauderdale County's first representative in the Mississippi state legislature.

== See also ==
- Lauderdale County School District
- National Register of Historic Places listings in Lauderdale County, Mississippi
