= Mississippi Highway 436 =

Highway in Mississippi

Mississippi Highway 436
- MS 436 highlighted in pink

Route information
- Maintained by MDOT
- Length: 11.147 mi (17.939 km)
- Existed: c. 1957–present

Major junctions
- West end: Eastside Lake Washington Road in Glen Allan
- East end: US 61 near Percy

Location
- Country: United States
- State: Mississippi
- Counties: Washington

Highway system
- Mississippi State Highway System; Interstate; US; State
← MS 434	→ MS 438

Mississippi Highway 436 (MS 436) is a state highway in western Mississippi. The route starts at Eastside Lake Washington Road in Glen Allan and travels eastward. The road intersects MS 1 in Hampton and turns northeastward. It ends near Percy at U.S. Route 61 (US 61). MS 436 was designated in 1957, along a road from US 61 to a point near the Washington–Sharkey county line. The route was extended westward to Glen Allan along a state-maintained road in 1958, and also eastward to Belzoni via a county road in 1967. The route east of US 61 was decommissioned by 1967.

== Route description ==
Traffic volume on Mississippi Highway 436
Location	Volume
West of MS 1	810
Northeast of Grace Road	240
East of Woodsaw Mill Road	230
Data was measured in 2017 in terms of AADT; Source: Mississippi Department of Transportation

All of the route is located in Washington County. MS 436 is legally defined in Mississippi Code § 65-3-3, and all of it is maintained by the Mississippi Department of Transportation (MDOT), as part of the Mississippi State Highway System.

MS 436 starts at Eastside Lake Washington Road, near the eastern shore of Lake Washington and the unincorporated area of Glen Allan. The route travels eastward through farmland to MS 1 in Hampton, and it crosses Steele Bayou afterwards. The road turns northeastwards at Grace Road and borders the Yazoo National Wildlife Refuge. The road travels along Steele Bayou and it intersects the entrance to the refuge at Beargarden Road. At Woodsaw Mill Road, MS 436 turns east and away from the refuge. Past the second intersection with Beargarden Road, the road shifts south towards the Washinghton–Sharkey county line. The route travels on the county line, ending at US 61 at a three-way junction near Percy.

== History ==
Around 1933, a gravel road was constructed from MS 1 near Glen Allan to US 61 near the Washington–Sharkey county line, and it was later paved by 1948. The section from Glen Allan to Hampton also became part of MS 1. MS 1 was realigned in 1952, no longer routing through Glen Allen. By 1957, a new paved road was constructed from US 61 near Hollandale to a point near the Washington–Humphreys county line, and it was designated as MS 436. About one year later, MS 436 was extended westward to Glen Allan, connecting to MS 1. A county-maintained county road in Humphreys County was added to the route by 1960, connecting the route to US 49W near Belzoni. By 1967, the section east of US 61 was removed from the route, and the route has not changed significantly since.

== Major intersections ==
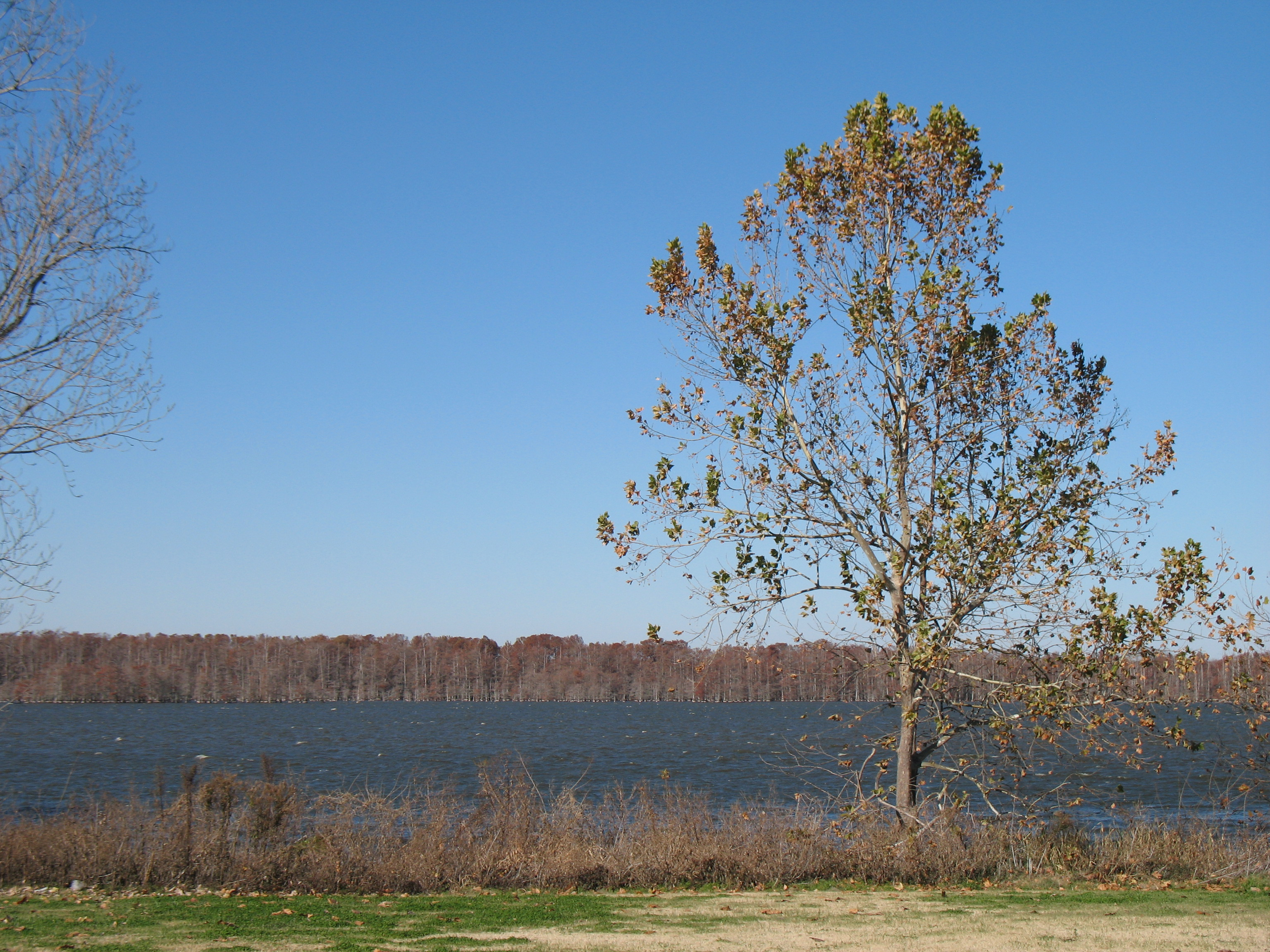
Lake Washington near MS 436

County	Location	mi	km	Destinations	Notes
Washington	Glen Allan	0.0	0.0	Eastside Lake Washington Road	Western terminus
Washington	Hampton	1.6	2.6	MS 1 – Greenville, Mayersville	
Washington		5.7	9.2	Beargarden Road – Yazoo National Wildlife Refuge	Refuge entrance
Washington–Sharkey county line		11.1	17.9	US 61 – Hollandale, Anguilla	Eastern terminus
1.000 mi = 1.609 km; 1.000 km = 0.621 mi

== See also ==
- Mississippi Highway 444
- Mississippi Highway 450
- Mississippi Highway 454
