= Mississippi Highway 1 =

State highway in Mississippi, United States

Mississippi Highway 1
- MS 1 highlighted in red

Route information
- Maintained by MDOT
- Length: 148.632 mi (239.200 km) (154.3 mi including concurrencies)
- Existed: 1932–present

Major junctions
- South end: US 61 in Onward
- US 82 / US 278 in Greenville
- North end: US 49 in Powell

Location
- Country: United States
- State: Mississippi
- Counties: Sharkey, Issaquena, Washington, Bolivar, Coahoma

Highway system
- Mississippi State Highway System; Interstate; US; State
← MS 992	→ MS 2

Mississippi Highway 1 (MS 1) is a state highway in Mississippi that runs south from U.S. Highway 49 near Lula to U.S. Highway 61 south of Cary, roughly paralleling the Mississippi River. It travels approximately 148 miles (238 km), serving Sharkey, Issaquena, Washington, Bolivar, and Coahoma Counties. The entire route is part of the Great River Road and lies entirely within the Mississippi Delta region.

== Route description ==
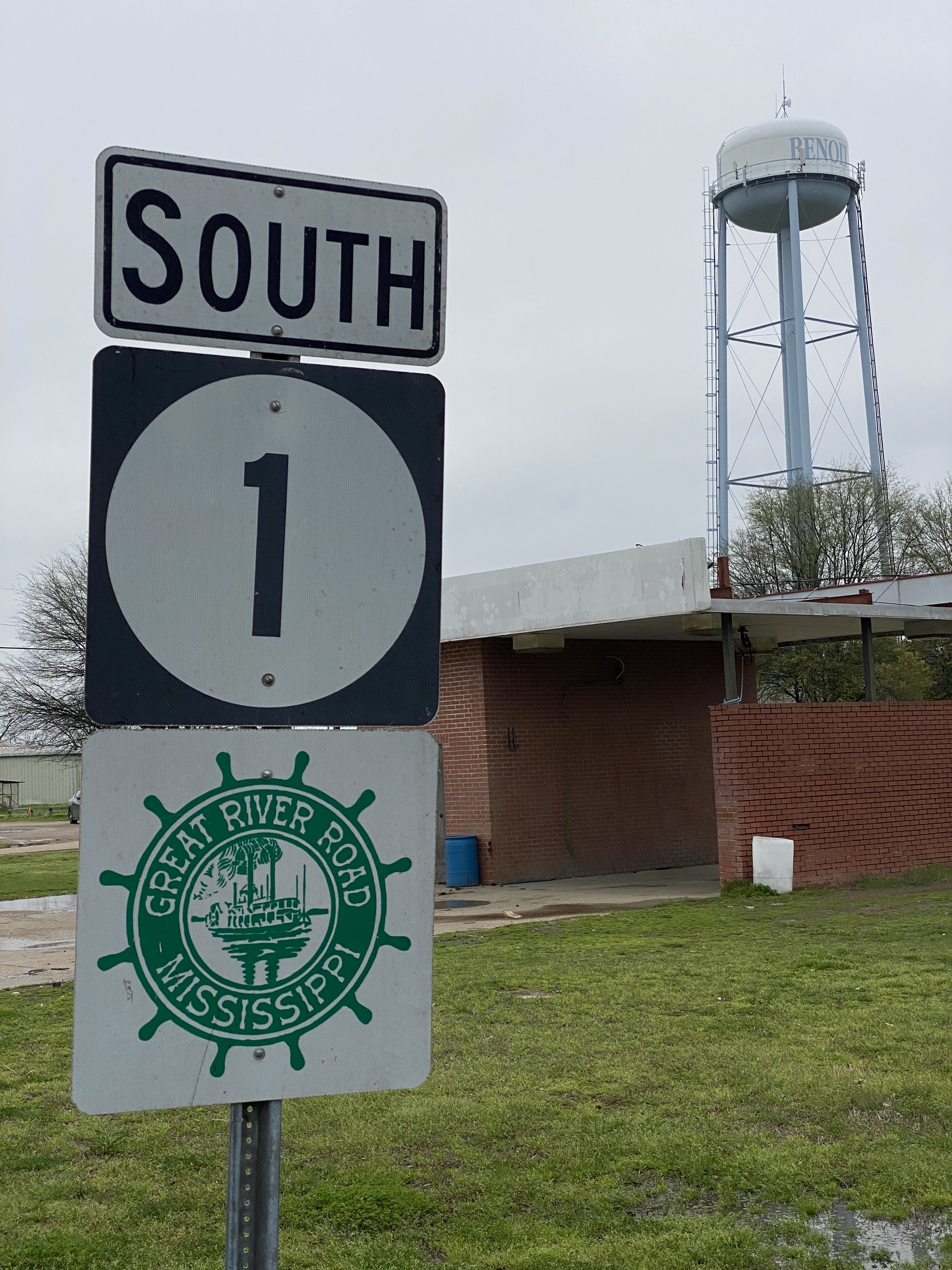
Benoit water tower seen from Mississippi Highway 1

MS 1 begins in far northeastern Sharkey County at the community of Onward at an intersection with US 61. It heads westward as a two-lane highway for a couple of miles to cross a creek before entering Issaquena County.

MS 1 now crosses Newsom Bayou before having an intersection with MS 465 and turning northward to follow the Mississippi River at the Fitler community (where it passes by Fitler Lake). The highway winds its way north through rural farmland to pass through the town of Mayersville before curving eastward and inland for several miles. MS 1 turns back north again at an intersection between MS 14 and Willett Road, crossing over Steele Bayou shortly thereafter. The passes through the Grace community, where it has an intersection with a short connector road to MS 16 (Grace Road), and crosses over Mound Bayou, before entering Washington County.

MS 1 passes through Woodside before crossing Steele Bayou and passing Hampton, where the road has an intersection with MS 436 (which provides access to the nearby town of Glen Allan and Lake Washington. The heads north, passing along the Yazoo National Wildlife Refuge western boundary, as well as Lake Washington's eastern shoreline, for several miles, passing through Foote, Erwin, and Chatham, before following the Mississippi River again at an intersection with MS 12. MS 1 passes along the shores of Lake Lee, traveling through Avon, Wayside (where it has an intersection with MS 438 and widens to four-lanes), and Swiftwater (where it has an intersection with MS 454). The highway then enters the Greenville city limits at the site of a future interchange with the Greenville Bypass. MS 1 passes through two major business districts two have an intersection with US 82/US 278. It bypasses downtown along its eastern side as it passes through neighborhoods and passes by Delta Regional Medical Center. The highway now narrows back down to two-lanes at an intersection with Broadway (unsigned MS 814, provides access to Metcalfe and Mid Delta Regional Airport) and leaves Greenville as it passes along the shoreline of Lake Ferguson. MS 1 passes through Winterville, where it travels past the Winterville site, before crossing into Bolivar County.

MS 1 passes through Lamont before following along the shores of Lake Bolivar for a few miles as it passes through Scott, where it has an intersection with MS 450. The highway has an intersection with a county road leading to Bolivar (Lake Bolivar Road) before heading northeast through farmland to pass through Benoit as Main Street, where it has an intersection with MS 448 and another county road leading to Bolivar and the Mississippi River (Preston Street to Bolivar Road). MS 1 has an intersection with MS 446 (which provides access to the Dahomey National Wildlife Refuge) before passing along the coastline of Lake Beulah and through the town of Beulah as Clark Street. The highway now passes through the town of Rosedale along Main Street, passing by Walter Sillers Memorial Park and Great River Road State Park, as well as having an intersection with MS 8, before passing straight through downtown. MS 1 leaves Rosedale and passes through the community of Waxhaw, the town of Gunnison (where it intersects both ends of MS 804 and passes by Old River Lake), the community of Perthshire (where it intersects MS 32), the community of Deeson, and the community of Round Lake (where it has an intersection with MS 444) before crossing into Coahoma County.

MS 1 curves northeast and travels through Hillhouse and Rena Lara, where it crosses the Hushpuckena River and passes by Desoto Lake, before passing through Sherard, where it has an intersection with MS 322. The highway now passes through Farrell and Stovall, where it passes by Horseshoe Lake, before having an intersection with Friars Point Road, a county road that leads to the nearby towns of Friars Point and Coahoma. Friars Point Road proposed to become part of an extension of MS 316. MS 1 now traverses a narrow strip of land that separates Moon Lake from the Mississippi River for several miles, where it has an intersection with Moon Lake Road (which provides access to the community of Moon Lake), before coming to an end at an intersection with US 49 near the town of Lula.

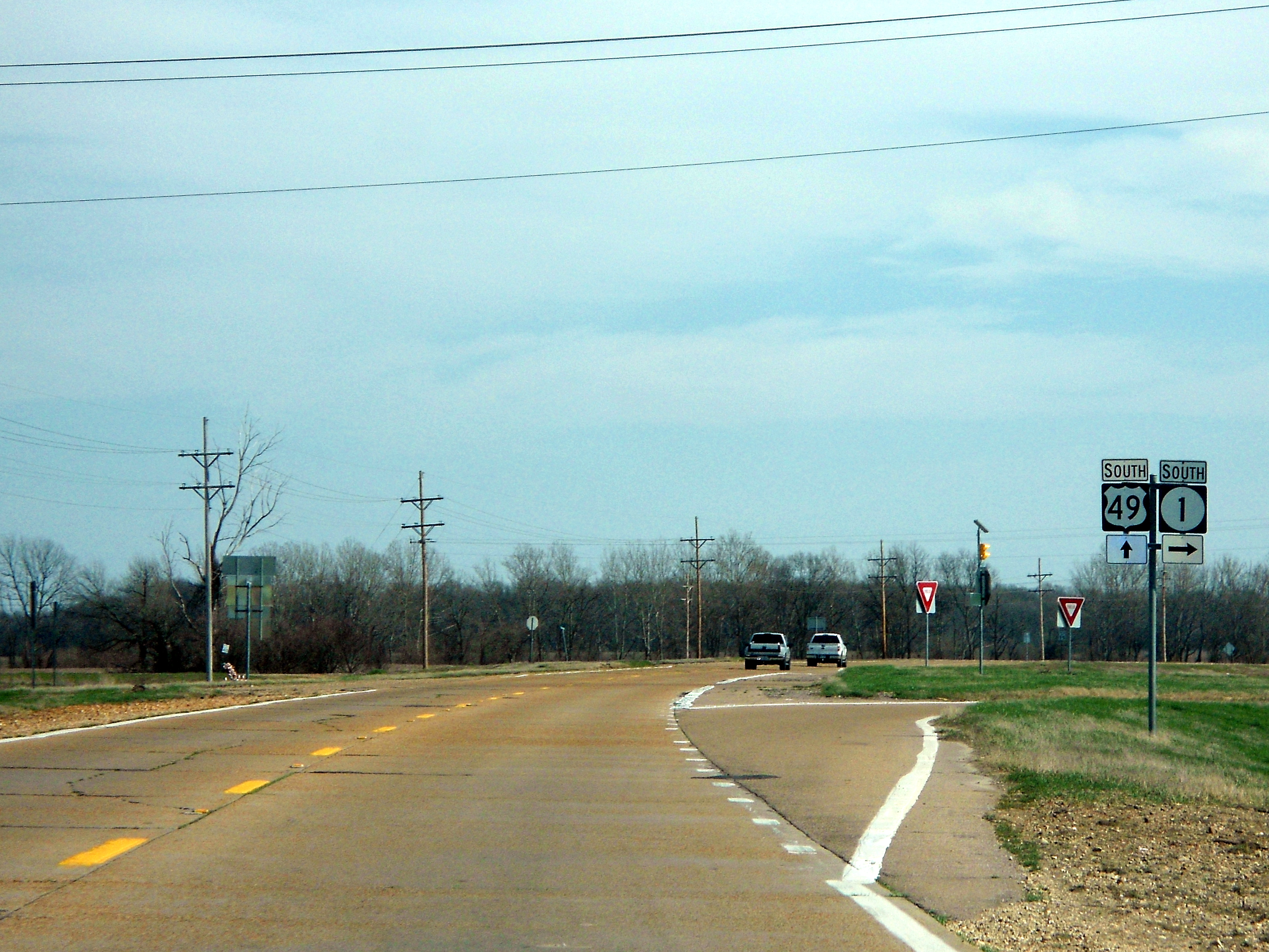
Mississippi 1 departs US 49

== Major intersections ==
County	Location	mi	km	Destinations	Notes
Sharkey	Onward	0.0	0.0	US 61 / Great River Road south – Rolling Fork, Vicksburg	Southern terminus
Issaquena		4.7	7.6	MS 465 south – Albemarle Lake, Lake Chotard, Eagle Lake	Northern terminus of MS 465
Issaquena	Mayersville	22.9	36.9	MS 14 west – Mayersville	South end of MS 14 overlap
Issaquena		28.6	46.0	MS 14 east – Rolling Fork	North end of MS 14 overlap
Issaquena	Grace	34.2	55.0	Grace Road; To MS 16 – Rolling Fork	
Washington	Hampton	37.8	60.8	MS 436 to US 61 – Glen Allan, Yazoo National Wildlife Refuge	
Washington		48.7	78.4	MS 12 east – Hollandale, Leroy Percy State Park	Western terminus of MS 12
Washington	Wayside	55.7	89.6	MS 438 east – Arcola	Western terminus of MS 438
Washington		58.9	94.8	MS 454 west – River Bridge, Casino	Eastern terminus of MS 454
Washington				US 82 / US 278 – Lake Village, AR, Leland, Greenwood	Interchange; Greenville Bypass
Washington	Greenville	63.8	102.7	Reed Road	proposed MS 814
Washington	Greenville	64.8	104.3	MS 182 – Lake Village, AR, Leland	
Washington	Greenville	67.5	108.6	Broadway (MS 814 west) – Metcalfe, Casinos, Mid-Delta Regional Airport	Eastern terminus of MS 814
Washington		71.0	114.3	Winterville site	Access road into park
Bolivar	Scott	77.8	125.2	MS 450 east to US 61 – Choctaw	Western terminus of MS 450
Bolivar	Benoit	84.9	136.6	MS 448 east – Shaw	Western terminus of MS 448
Bolivar		89.0	143.2	MS 446 east – Skene, Boyle, Dahomey National Wildlife Refuge	Western terminus of MS 446
Bolivar	Rosedale	100.0	160.9	MS 8 east – Cleveland; State Park Road - Great River Road State Park	Western terminus of MS 8; access road into park
Bolivar		107.6	173.2	MS 804 east (Scott Road)	Western terminus of MS 804
Bolivar	Gunnison	108.5	174.6	MS 804 west (Main Street)	Eastern terminus of MS 804
Bolivar	Perthshire	110.7	178.2	MS 32 east – Shelby	Western terminus of MS 32
Bolivar		117.8	189.6	MS 444 east – Duncan	Western terminus of MS 444
Coahoma	Sherard	132.7	213.6	MS 322 east – Clarksdale	Western terminus of MS 322
Coahoma		145.1	233.5	Friars Point, North Delta Museum	proposed MS 316
Coahoma		154.3	248.3	US 49 / Great River Road north to US 61 – Helena, AR	Northern terminus
1.000 mi = 1.609 km; 1.000 km = 0.621 mi: Concurrency terminus; Unopened

== See also ==
- List of state highways in Mississippi
- List of highways numbered 1
