= Mississippi Highway 438 =

Highway in Mississippi

Mississippi Highway 438
- Arcola–Trail Lake Road
- MS 438 highlighted in pink

Route information
- Maintained by MDOT
- Length: 17.399 mi (28.001 km)
- Existed: c. 1950–present

Major junctions
- West end: MS 1 in Wayside
- US 61 near Arcola
- East end: Sunflower River Road / Kinlock Road south of Kinlock

Location
- Country: United States
- State: Mississippi
- Counties: Washington

Highway system
- Mississippi State Highway System; Interstate; US; State
| ← MS 436 | → MS 440 |

Mississippi Highway 438 (MS 438) is a state highway in western Mississippi. The route starts at MS 1 in Wayside and travels eastward. The road travels through farmland and intersects U.S. Route 61 (US 61) and its old alignment near Arcola. MS 438 continues eastward and ends at Sunflower River Road and Kinlock Road on the Washington–Sunflower county line near Kinlock. The route was constructed around 1950, connecting from MS 1 to US 61. The route was extended to the Washington–Sunflower county line by 1958, and to US 49W in Inverness by 1960. The section east of the county line was removed from the route by 1974.

== Route description ==
Traffic volume on Mississippi Highway 438
| Location | Volume |
|---|---|
| East of L&W Fish Farm Road | 3,300 |
| East of Dever Road | 2,700 |
| East of Hermitage Road | 3,000 |
| East of US 61 | 3,700 |
| West of Smylie Road | 380 |
| East of Tribbett Road | 210 |
Data was measured in 2017 in terms of AADT; Source: Mississippi Department of Transportation

All of the route is located in Washington County. MS 438 is legally defined in Mississippi Code § 65-3-3, and all of it is maintained by the Mississippi Department of Transportation (MDOT), as part of the Mississippi State Highway System.

MS 438, known as Arcola–Trail Lake Road, starts at the intersection of MS 1 and Thaggard Road in the unincorporated area of Wayside and travels eastward. The route, travelling through farmland, crosses over a drainage ditch near L&W Fish Farm Road and Black Bayou at Dever Road. West of Bennett Street, MS 438 enters the town of Arcola. The route passes through a residential area inside the town, and intersects Old US 61 near Downtown Arcola. At Deer Creek, the road leaves the city limits of the town. MS 483 then intersects US 61 outside the town and re-enters farmland. The route crosses Bogue Phalia near Martha Plantation Road, and intersects Tribbett Road in Tralake. East of Sanders Road, the road begins travelling along the Washington–Sunflower county line. MS 438 ends at a three-way junction with Sunflower River Road and Kinlock Road, adjacent to the Sunflower River.

== History ==
MS 438 was constructed around 1950, connecting MS 1 in Wayside to US 61 in Arcola as a paved road. Eight years later, the route was extended along a paved road eastward to the Washington–Sunflower county line. By 1960, a county-maintained gravel road in Sunflower County was added to MS 438, connecting the route to US 49W in Inverness. The county road became paved and state-maintained by 1967, and a $1,709,403 (equivalent to $16,119,909 in 2024) project to grade the route and other improvements started. Due to budgetary issues, MS 438 was proposed to be decommissioned and returned to county maintenance twice: Once in 1968 after the route became poorly conditioned, and in 1969 to prioritize another road that needed paving in Greenville. A project to improve five miles (8.0 km) of MS 438 in Washington County started in 1969, costing $1,327,260 (equivalent to $11,380,472 in 2024). The section in Sunflower County was removed from the route by 1974.

== Major intersections ==
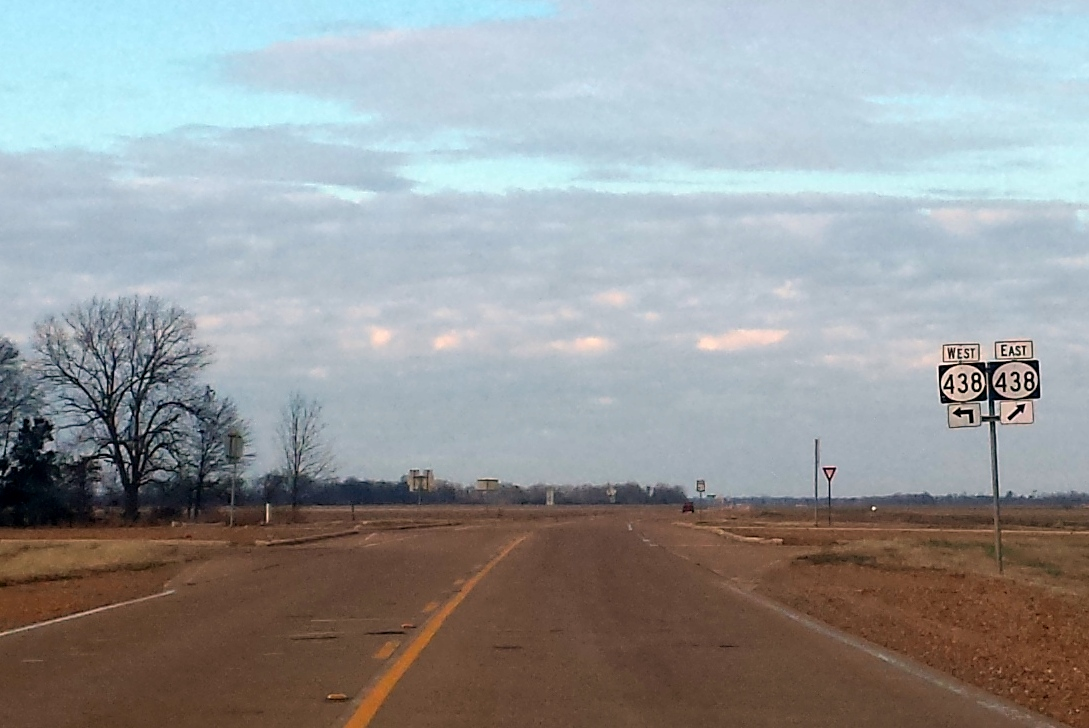
MS 438 at US 61

| County | Location | mi | km | Destinations | Notes |
|---|---|---|---|---|---|
| Washington | Wayside | 0.0 | 0.0 | MS 1 – Greenville, Glen Allan | Western terminus |
| Washington | | 9.6 | 15.4 | US 61 – Leland, Hollandale, Vicksburg | |
| Washington–Sunflower county line | | 17.4 | 28.0 | Sunflower River Road / Kinlock Road | Eastern terminus |
1.000 mi = 1.609 km; 1.000 km = 0.621 mi

== See also ==
- Belmont Plantation (Wayside, Mississippi) – Located on MS 1 and MS 438
- Mississippi Highway 450
- Mississippi Highway 454
