= Mississippi Highway 316 =

Highway in Mississippi

Mississippi Highway 316

Route information
- Maintained by Coahoma County and MDOT
- Length: 22.778 mi (36.658 km)
- Existed: 1956–present

Major junctions
- West end: Rozell Lane in Friars Point
- MS 1 near Friars Point; US 49 / US 61 near Coahoma
- East end: US 278 / MS 6 near Marks

Location
- Country: United States
- State: Mississippi
- Counties: Coahoma, Quitman

Highway system
- Mississippi State Highway System; Interstate; US; State
← MS 315	→ MS 321

Mississippi Highway 316 (MS 316) is a state highway connecting Friars Point, Jonestown, and Marks in the Mississippi Delta region of Mississippi. It is a two-lane route for its entire length of 22.8 miles (36.7 km).

== Route description ==
MS 316 begins at the eastern city limits of Friars Point along Rozell Lane. Unsigned at this point, it heads east along Friars Point Road as a county-maintained two-lane road towards a stop-intersection with MS 1. The road continues east through agricultural fields until it skits the southern limits of Coahoma and has a grade crossing with the Mississippi Delta Railroad. MS 316 curves to the southeast where it first intersects US 49/US 61, then continues further southeast towards Jonestown. In the town, MS 316 travels along Coahoma Road and Main Street. Past the town's eastern limit, state maintenance begins and the MS 316 is signed. The road parallels Moore Bayou towards the southeast before heading east into Quitman County. It briefly parallels Moore Bayou again before heading through Belen. The highway resumes a southeasterly course before ending at US 278 / MS 6 west of Marks.

== Major intersections ==
County	Location	mi	km	Destinations	Notes
Coahoma	Friars Point	0.000	0.000	Rozell Lane	Eastern terminus; Friars Point city limits
Coahoma		1.689	2.718	MS 1 – Rosedale, Gunnison, Helena	
Coahoma		8.153– 8.229	13.121– 13.243	US 49 / US 61 – Clarksdale, Helena, Memphis	
Quitman		22.778	36.658	US 278 / MS 6 – Marks, Clarksdale	Western terminus
1.000 mi = 1.609 km; 1.000 km = 0.621 mi
