= Perthshire, Mississippi =

- Unincorporated community
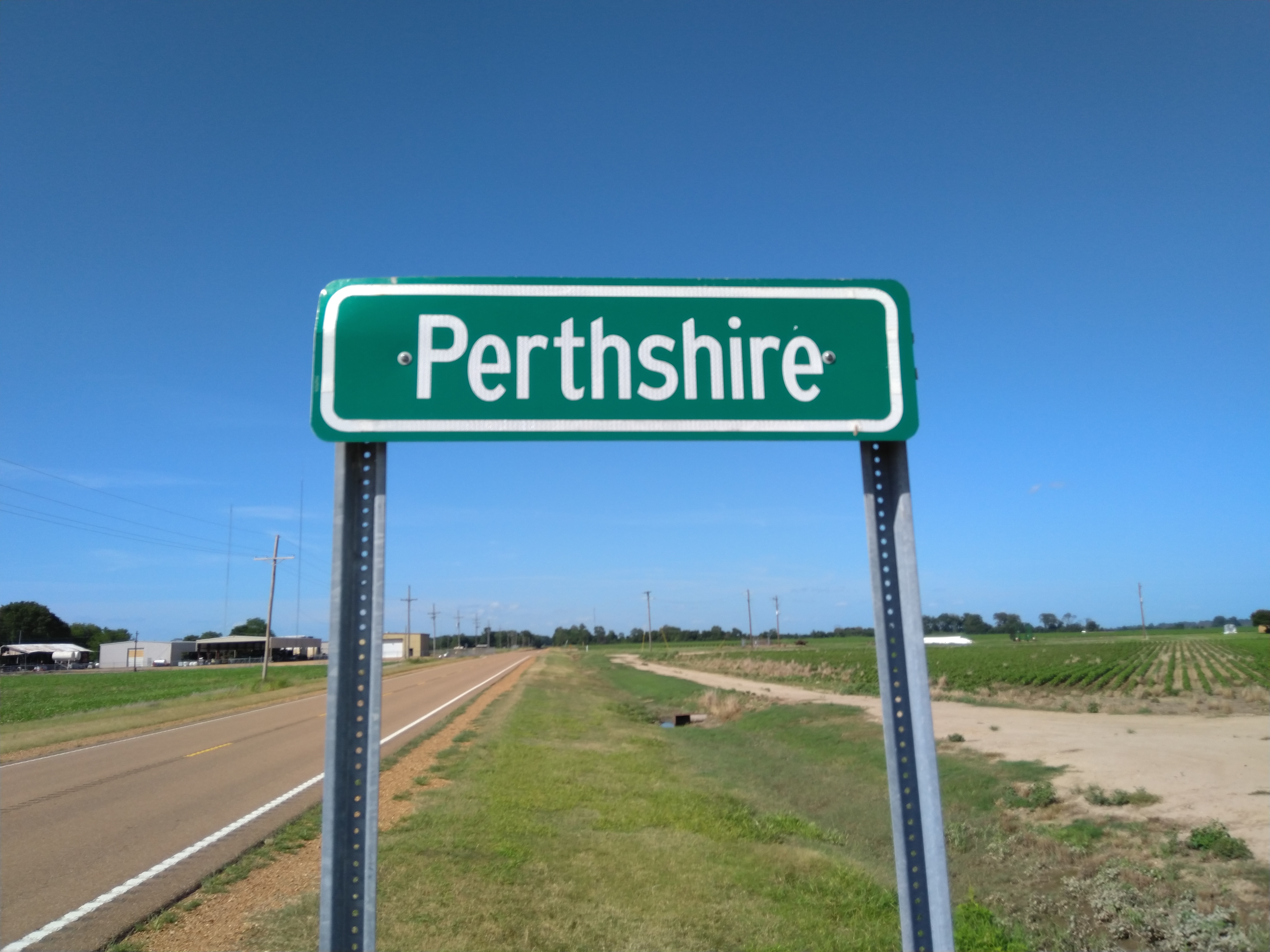
- Highway sign in Perthshire

- Location within Mississippi Location within the United States
- Coordinates: 33°58′38″N 90°54′44″W
- Country: United States
- State: Mississippi
- County: Bolivar
- Elevation: 135 ft (41 m)
- Time zone: UTC-6 (Central (CST))
  - Summer (DST): UTC-5 (CDT)
- ZIP code: 38746
- Area code: 662
- GNIS feature ID: 675639

Perthshire is an unincorporated community located in Bolivar County, Mississippi, United States along Mississippi Highway 1. Perthshire is approximately 5 miles (8.0 km) south of Deeson and approximately 3 miles (4.8 km) north of Gunnison. Perthshire is located on the Riverside Division of the former Yazoo and Mississippi Valley Railroad. Perthshire was once home to six general stores.

A post office operated under the name Perthshire from 1889 to 1963.

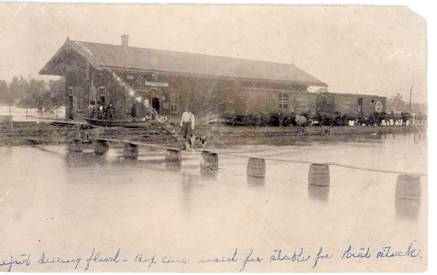
Box cars at the Perthshire depot were used as livestock stables during flooding in 1897

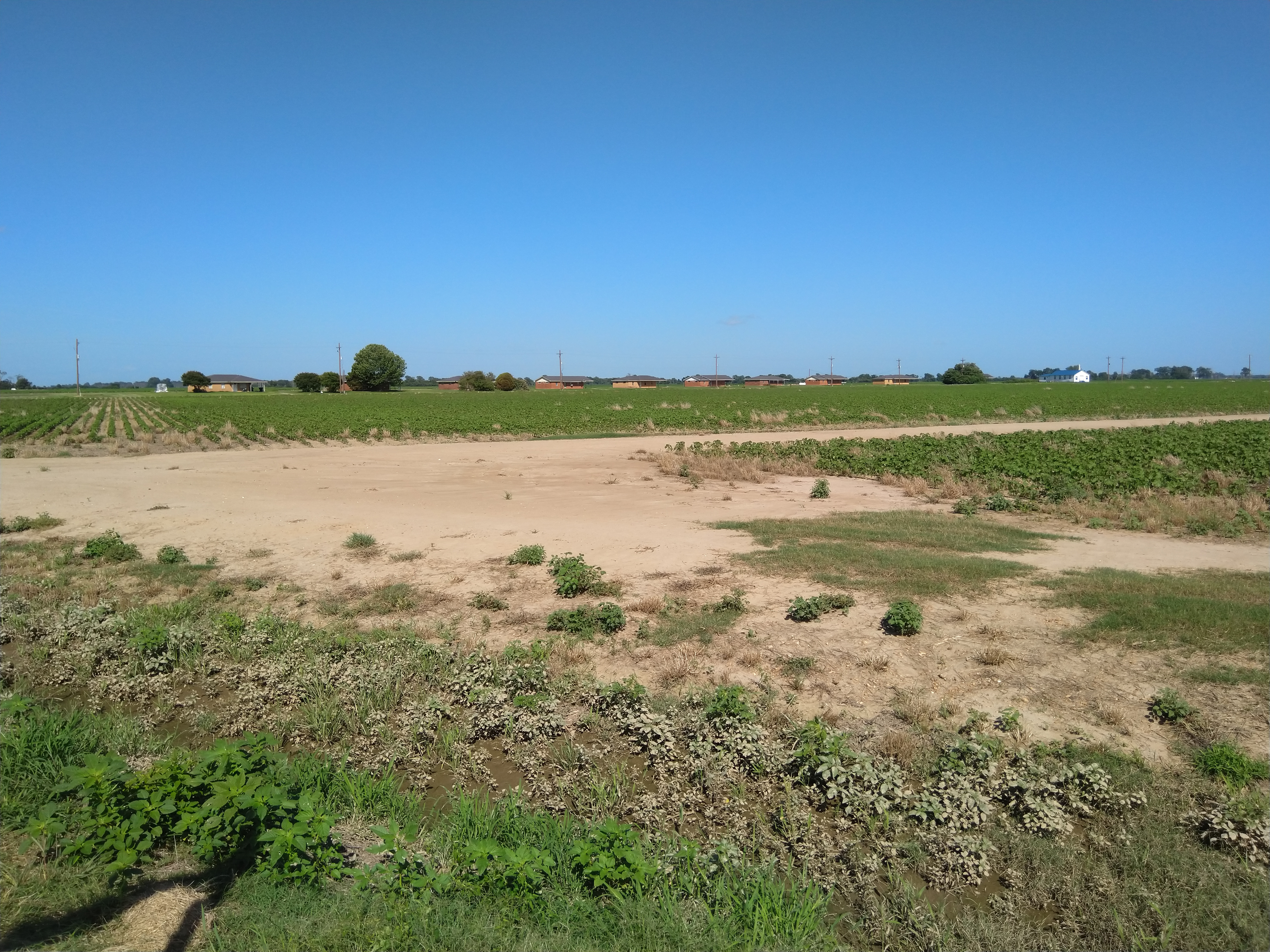
Homes in the Perthshire community
