= Mississippi Highway 444 =

Highway in Mississippi

Mississippi Highway 444
- MS 444 highlighted in red

Route information
- Maintained by MDOT
- Length: 6.578 mi (10.586 km)
- Existed: 1958–present

Major junctions
- West end: MS 1 near Round Lake
- East end: US 61 / US 278 in Duncan

Location
- Country: United States
- State: Mississippi
- Counties: Bolivar

Highway system
- Mississippi State Highway System; Interstate; US; State
← MS 442	→ MS 446

Mississippi Highway 444 (MS 444) is a short highway in western Mississippi. Its western terminus is at MS 1, and travels eastward through six miles (9.7 km) of farmland. The route enters Duncan, and ends at U.S. Route 61 (US 61) and US 278, its eastern terminus. MS 444 was designated in 1958, and became paved two years later.

== Route description ==
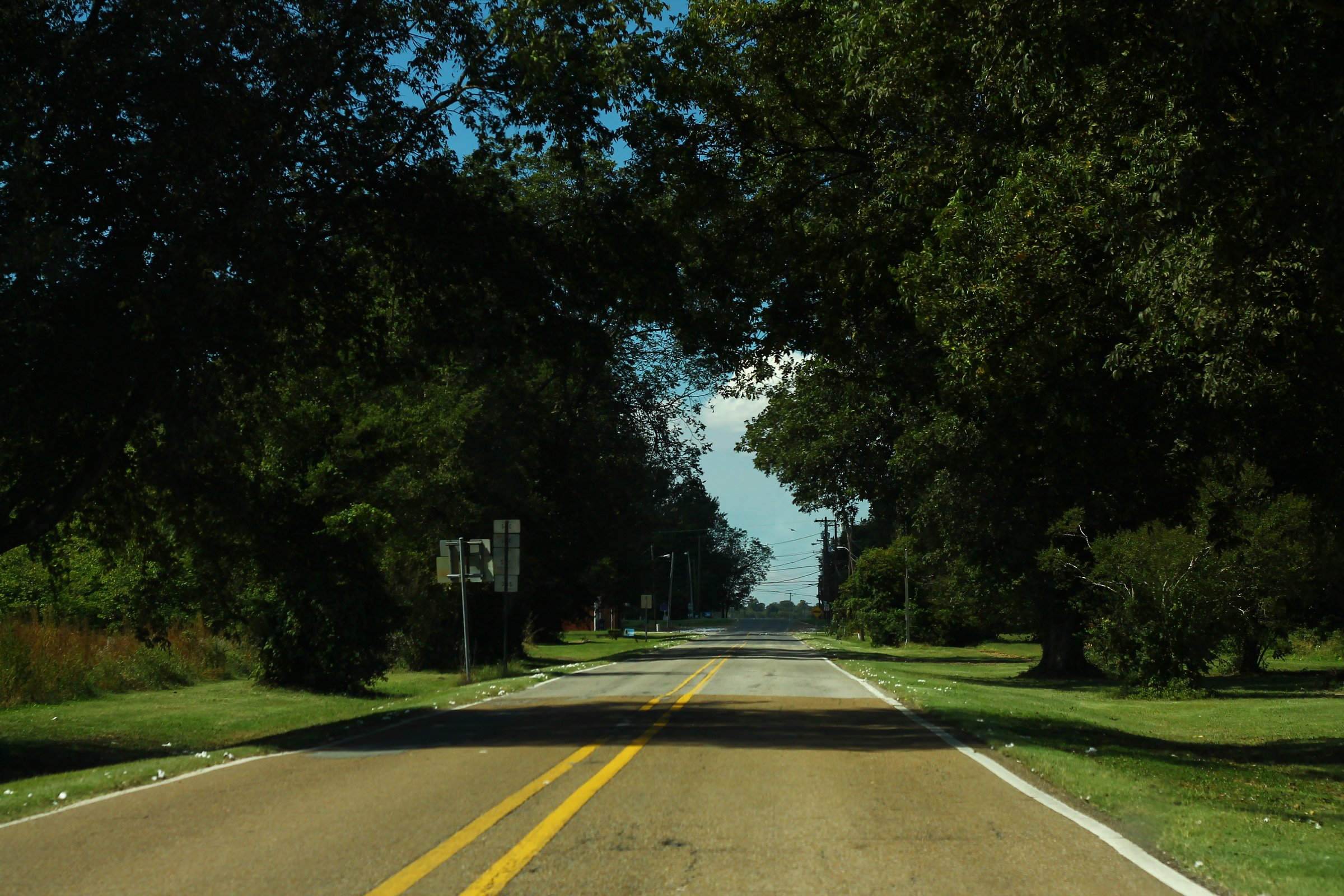
MS 444 in Duncan

All of the road is located in northern Bolivar County. In 2012, Mississippi Department of Transportation (MDOT) calculated as many as 750 vehicles traveling west of US 61/US 278, and as few as 330 vehicles traveling east of MS 1. MS 444 is legally defined in Mississippi Code § 65-3-3, and is maintained by MDOT as part of the state highway system.

MS 444 starts at a T-intersection with MS 1 and travels eastward. The route travels through farmland in a straight line. MS 444 intersects Caston Road, a dirt road that also leads to Duncan. MS 444 continues east, intersecting minor dirt roads. East of Yates Road, the road enters a small area of trees, before re-entering to more farmland. The route curves slightly to the southeast about one mile (1.6 km) later, at Sandy Ridge Road. MS 444 soon crosses the Hushpuckena River, and enters into Duncan. Near the center of Duncan, the route intersects the old alignment of US 61. The road continues east and ends at a T-intersection with US 61.

== History ==
MS 444 was designated in 1958, as an unpaved road from MS 1 to US 61. The route became paved by 1960. In 1967, US 61 was rerouted to its east, no longer passing through Duncan. By 1999, US 278 was designated, concurrent with US 61 through MS 444's eastern terminus.

== Major intersections ==
The entire route is in Bolivar County.

Location	mi	km	Destinations	Notes
	0.000	0.000	MS 1 – Rosedale, Gunnison, Round Lake, Rena Lara	Western terminus
Duncan	6.578	10.586	US 61 / US 278 – Cleveland, Shelby, Alligator, Clarksdale	Eastern terminus
1.000 mi = 1.609 km; 1.000 km = 0.621 mi
