= Tralake, Mississippi =

- Unincorporated community
- Location within Mississippi Location within the United States
- Coordinates: 33°16′13″N 90°47′41″W
- Country: United States
- State: Mississippi
- County: Washington
- Elevation: 105 ft (32 m)
- Time zone: UTC-6 (Central (CST))
  - Summer (DST): UTC-5 (CDT)
- ZIP code: 38779
- Area code: 662
- GNIS feature ID: 678853

Tralake is an unincorporated community located in Washington County, Mississippi. Tralake is approximately 5.8 miles (9.3 km) west-southwest of Kinlock, approximately 5.6 miles (9.0 km) west-southwest of Tribbett and approximately 4.9 miles (7.9 km) east of Arcola along Mississippi Highway 438.

== Notable people ==
- Dusty Brown, musician who played the blues harp; under the Parrot Records label he recorded "Yes She's Gone" and "He Don't Love You".
