= Farrell, Mississippi =

- Census-designated place
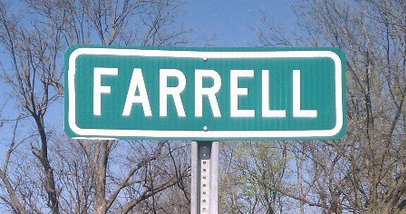

- Location within Mississippi
- Coordinates: 34°15′42″N 90°40′30″W
- Country: United States
- State: Mississippi
- County: Coahoma

Area
  - Total: 1.30 sq mi (3.36 km^{2})
  - Land: 1.30 sq mi (3.36 km^{2})
  - Water: 0 sq mi (0.00 km^{2})
- Elevation: 167 ft (51 m)

Population (2020)
  - Total: 200
  - Density: 154/sq mi (59.5/km^{2})
- Time zone: UTC-6 (Central (CST))
  - Summer (DST): UTC-5 (CDT)
- ZIP code: 38630
- Area code: 662
- GNIS feature ID: 2586592

Farrell is an unincorporated community and census-designated place in Coahoma County, Mississippi, United States. Per the 2020 census, the population was 200. Farrell is located approximately 4 miles (6 km) south of Stovall and 4 miles (6 km) north of Sherard on Mississippi Highway 1. It is approximately 9 miles (14 km) northwest of Clarksdale, the county seat.

== Climate ==
The climate in this area is characterized by hot, humid summers and generally mild to cool winters. According to the Köppen Climate Classification system, Farrell has a humid subtropical climate, abbreviated "Cfa" on climate maps.

== Demographics ==
Historical population
Census	Pop.	Note	%±
2010	218		—
2020	200		−8.3%
U.S. Decennial Census

Farrell first appeared as a census designated place in the 2010 U.S. census.

=== 2020 census ===
Farrell CDP, Mississippi – Racial and ethnic composition Note: the US Census treats Hispanic/Latino as an ethnic category. This table excludes Latinos from the racial categories and assigns them to a separate category. Hispanics/Latinos may be of any race.
Race / Ethnicity (NH = Non-Hispanic)	Pop 2010	Pop 2020	% 2010	% 2020
White alone (NH)	21	17	9.63%	8.50%
Black or African American alone (NH)	197	176	90.37%	88.00%
Native American or Alaska Native alone (NH)	0	0	0.00%	0.00%
Asian alone (NH)	0	0	0.00%	0.00%
Native Hawaiian or Pacific Islander alone (NH)	0	0	0.00%	0.00%
Other race alone (NH)	0	1	0.00%	0.50%
Mixed race or Multiracial (NH)	0	3	0.00%	1.50%
Hispanic or Latino (any race)	0	3	0.00%	1.50%
Total	218	200	100.00%	100.00%
