= Eastland, Mississippi =

Eastland
- Populated place
- Location within Mississippi Location within the United States
- Coordinates: 33°39′02″N 90°31′19″W
- Country: United States
- State: Mississippi
- County: Sunflower
- Elevation: 125 ft (38 m)
- Time zone: UTC-6 (Central (CST))
  - Summer (DST): UTC-5 (CDT)
- ZIP code: 38778
- Area code: 662
- GNIS feature ID: 669627

Eastland is a populated place located in Sunflower County, Mississippi. Eastland is located on Mississippi Highway 442 west of Doddsville.
