= Mississippi Highway 446 =

Highway in Mississippi

Mississippi Highway 446
- Margaret A. Green Memorial Highway
- MS 446 highlighted in pink

Route information
- Maintained by MDOT
- Length: 15.206 mi (24.472 km)
- Existed: 1955–present

Major junctions
- West end: MS 1 south of Lobdell
- East end: US 61 / US 278 in Boyle

Location
- Country: United States
- State: Mississippi
- Counties: Bolivar

Highway system
- Mississippi State Highway System; Interstate; US; State
| ← MS 444 | → MS 448 |

Mississippi Highway 446 (MS 446) is a state highway in northwest Mississippi. The route starts at MS 1 near Lobdell, and it travels east through the Dahomey National Wildlife Refuge and Skene. The road enters Boyle, traveling through the center of the town as a boulevard. The route ends at U.S. Route 61 (US 61) and US 278 on the eastern side of Boyle, and the road continues as Peavine Road. The highway was designated in 1955 along its current alignment, after the state had funded projects to improve the preexisting county road. The route was fully paved in asphalt by 1957.

== Route description ==
Traffic volume on Mississippi Highway 446
| Location | Volume |
|---|---|
| East of Neblett Road | 460 |
| East of Howarth Road | 550 |
| West of Crosby Road | 1,300 |
| West of US 61 / US 278 | 2,900 |
Data was measured in 2019 in terms of AADT; Source: Mississippi Department of Transportation

All of MS 446 is located within Bolivar County. The route is legally defined in Mississippi Code § 65-3-3, and all of it is maintained by the Mississippi Department of Transportation (MDOT), as part of the Mississippi State Highway System.

MS 446 starts at a T-intersection with MS 1 south of Lobdell and travels eastward through farmland. East of Neblett Road, the route enters the Dahomey National Wildlife Refuge. An entrance to the visitor center is located on the road. Near Woodruff Road, MS 446 leaves the refuge and crosses over Bogue Phalia. The route continues traveling through farmland and crosses over smaller creeks. The road intersects Shaw–Skene Road at the unincorporated area of Skene. The route enters the town of Boyle east of Cypress Drive, and turns into a boulevard near the center of the town. Known as T.M. Jones Highway inside the town, the road crosses over Jones Bayou near Bayou Avenue. The route ends at US 61 and US 278, and the road continues eastward as Peavine Road.

== History ==
In late 1948, the Mississippi State Highway Commission began letting projects along a county road traversing from Lobdell to Boyle within Bolivar County. The first project was proposed in November, for grading and gravel surfacing a 2.82-mile (4.54 km) section of the road. One month later, another project to grade and surface another 10.86-mile (17.48 km) section was proposed. In February 1955, MS 446 was designated for a highway in Bolivar County, along with the name "Margaret A. Green Memorial Highway". A project to pave 10.452 miles (16.821 km) of the road in asphalt began one month later, with a cost of $216,156 (equivalent to $2,537,215 in 2024). By 1956, the route was added to the state highway map, starting from MS 1 and ending at US 61. The majority of road was paved in gravel, and a small section near Boyle paved in asphalt. One year later, all of the route was paved in asphalt. In 1990, the Dahomey National Wildlife Refuge was created, spanning over parts of MS 446.

== Major intersections ==
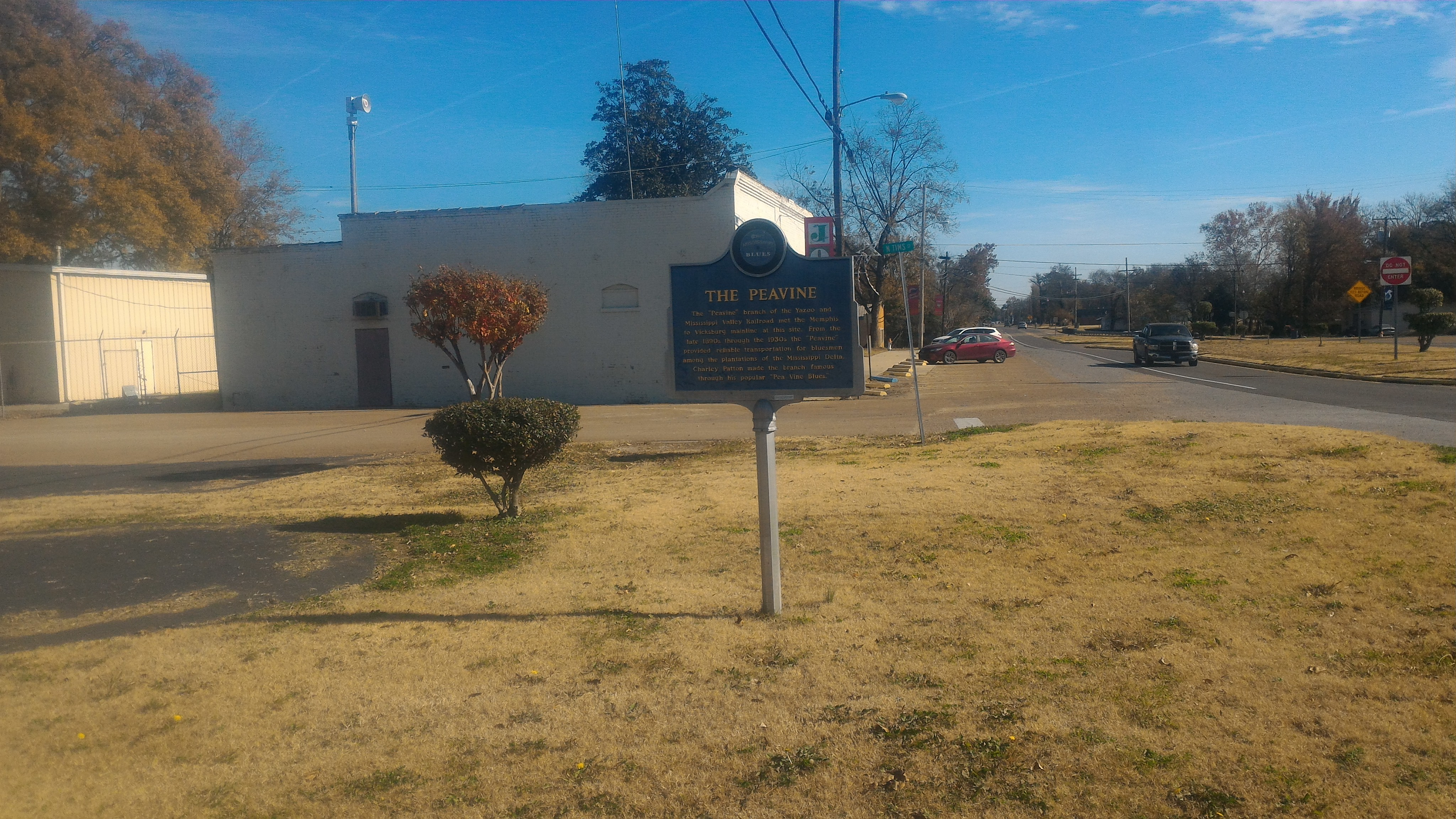
The Peavine, located on MS 446 in Boyle

The entire route is in Bolivar County.

| Location | mi | km | Destinations | Notes |
|---|---|---|---|---|
| | 0.000 | 0.000 | MS 1 – Greenville, Clarksdale | Western terminus |
| Boyle | 15.206 | 24.472 | US 61 / US 278 | Eastern terminus |
1.000 mi = 1.609 km; 1.000 km = 0.621 mi
