= Coahoma County School District =

School district in Mississippi

Address
- 1555 Lee Drive Clarksdale, Mississippi, 38614; United States

District information
- Type: Public
- Grades: K–12
- NCES District ID: 2801110

Students and staff
- Students: 1,009
- Teachers: 87.00 (FTE)
- Staff: 145.09
- Student–teacher ratio: 11.60

Other information
- Website: www.coahomak12.org

The Coahoma County School District (CCSD) is a public school district with its administrative headquarters in Clarksdale, Mississippi (USA).

The district serves the Coahoma County towns of Coahoma, Friars Point, Jonestown, Lula, and Lyon as well as the unincorporated community of Sherard and all other unincorporated areas; it does not serve areas within the City of Clarksdale.

== Schools ==
- Coahoma County Jr./Sr. High School (Clarksdale)
- Friars Point Elementary School (Friars Point)
- Jonestown Elementary School (Jonestown)
- Lyon Elementary School (Lyon)
- Sherard Elementary School (Sherard)

High school students also have the option of attending Coahoma Agricultural High School; that school is not a Coahoma County school district school, but instead is operated by Coahoma Community College.

== Demographics ==
=== 2006-07 school year ===
There were a total of 1,720 students enrolled in the Coahoma County School District during the 2006–2007 school year. The gender makeup of the district was 50% female and 50% male. The racial makeup of the district was 95.70% African American, 2.67% White, and 1.63% Hispanic. 91.1% of the district's students were eligible to receive free lunch.

=== Previous school years ===
School Year	Enrollment	Gender Makeup		Racial Makeup				
School Year	Enrollment	Female	Male	Asian	African American	Hispanic	Native American	White
2005-06	1,820	50%	50%	–	96.98%	1.32%	–	1.70%
2004-05	1,823	50%	50%	–	96.98%	1.10%	–	1.92%
2003-04	1,923	49%	51%	–	97.50%	1.25%	–	1.25%
2002-03	1,906	50%	50%	–	97.69%	1.00%	–	1.31%

== Accountability statistics ==
	2006-07	2005-06	2004-05	2003-04	2002-03
District Accreditation Status	Accredited	Probation	Probation	Accredited	Accredited
School Performance Classifications
Level 5 (Superior Performing) Schools	0	0	0	0	0
Level 4 (Exemplary) Schools	0	1	2	0	0
Level 3 (Successful) Schools	1	2	2	1	3
Level 2 (Under Performing) Schools	4	2	2	4	1
Level 1 (Low Performing) Schools	0	0	0	1	2
Not Assigned	0	0	0	0	0

== See also ==
- List of school districts in Mississippi
