= Coahoma County Junior-Senior High School =

High school in Mississippi, United States

Location
- 1535 Lee Drive; Clarksdale, (Coahoma County), Mississippi 38614; United States
- 34.2077°N 90.6082°W

Information
- Type: Public high school
- Principal: McKinley Scott
- Staff: 25.00 (FTE)
- Enrollment: 345 (2024-25)
- Student to teacher ratio: 13.80
- Colors: Red and white
- Mascot: Red Panthers
- Website: cchs.coahomak12.org

Coahoma County Junior-Senior High School (CCJSHS) is a public junior and senior high school within the city limits of Clarksdale, Mississippi. It is a part of the Coahoma County School District. The district serves the Coahoma County towns of Coahoma, Friars Point, Jonestown, Lula, and Lyon as well as the unincorporated community of Sherard and all other unincorporated areas. The City of Clarksdale is served by Clarksdale High School.

== History ==
Around the time of racial integration, circa the 1960s, there had been plans to build a new consolidated Clarksdale-Coahoma County High School to serve all children in Coahoma County; plans were abandoned, even though the building was already constructed because the officials wanted to maintain segregation in a de facto manner.

Many members of the American football team at the school transferred to Lee Academy as integration via court order was about to occur.

== See also ==
- Clarksdale High School
- Coahoma Agricultural High School
