= Mayersville, Mississippi =

- Town
- Hay bales near Mayersville

- Location of Mayersville, Mississippi

- Location in the United States
- Coordinates: 32°53′47″N 91°02′48″W
- Country: United States
- State: Mississippi
- County: Issaquena

Area
  - Total: 1.10 sq mi (2.85 km^{2})
  - Land: 1.10 sq mi (2.85 km^{2})
  - Water: 0 sq mi (0.00 km^{2})
- Elevation: 102 ft (31 m)

Population (2020)
  - Total: 433
  - Density: 393.2/sq mi (151.82/km^{2})
- Time zone: UTC-6 (Central (CST))
  - Summer (DST): UTC-5 (CDT)
- ZIP code: 39113
- Area code: 662
- FIPS code: 28-46000
- GNIS feature ID: 2406112
- Website: www.mayersville.ms.gov

Mayersville is a town on the east bank of the Mississippi River, and the county seat for Issaquena County, Mississippi, United States. It is located in the Mississippi Delta region, known for cotton cultivation in the antebellum era. Once the trading center for the county, the town was superseded when railroads were built into the area. As of the 2020 census, Mayersville had a population of 433.

== History ==
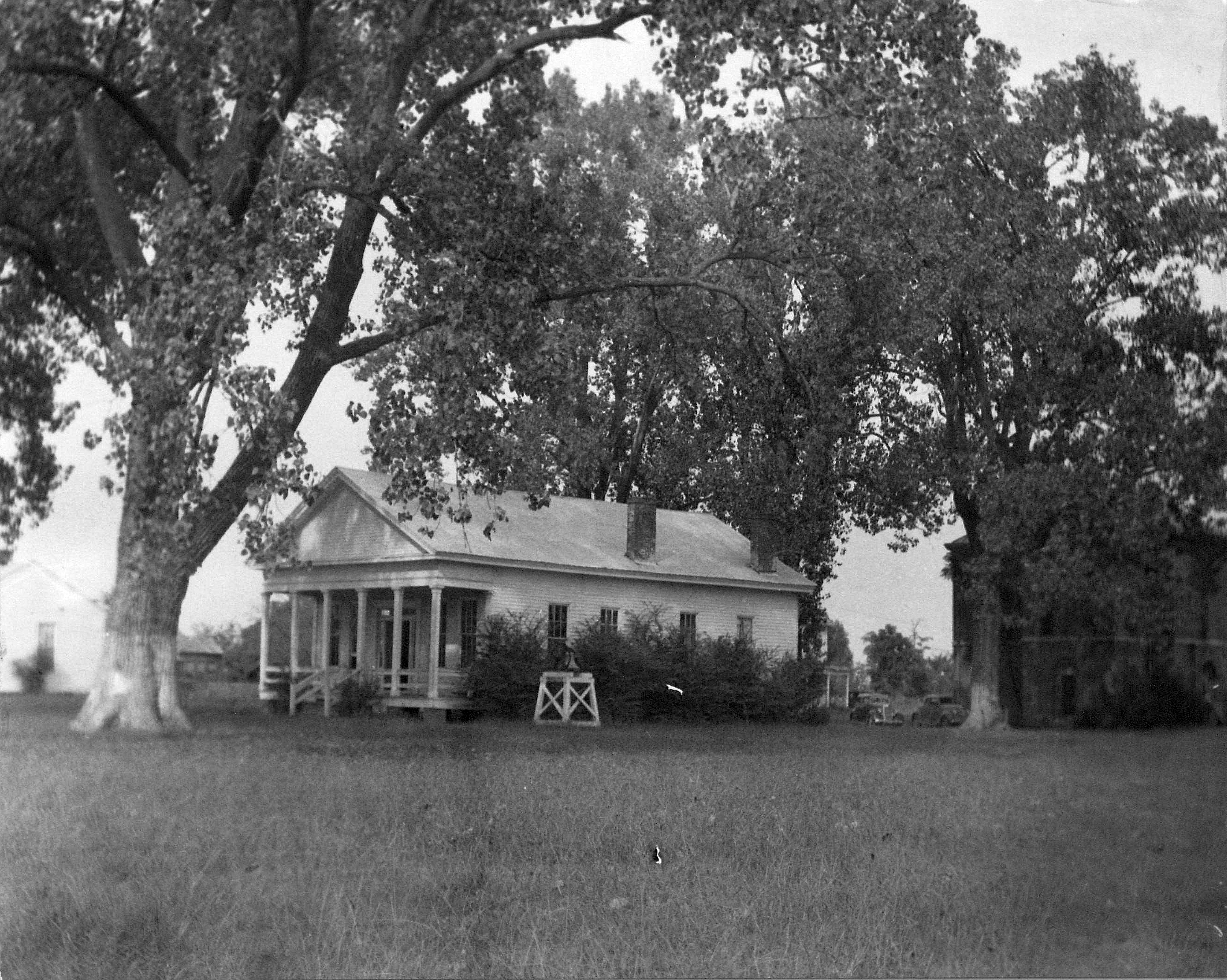
Historic photo of county courthouse in Mayersville

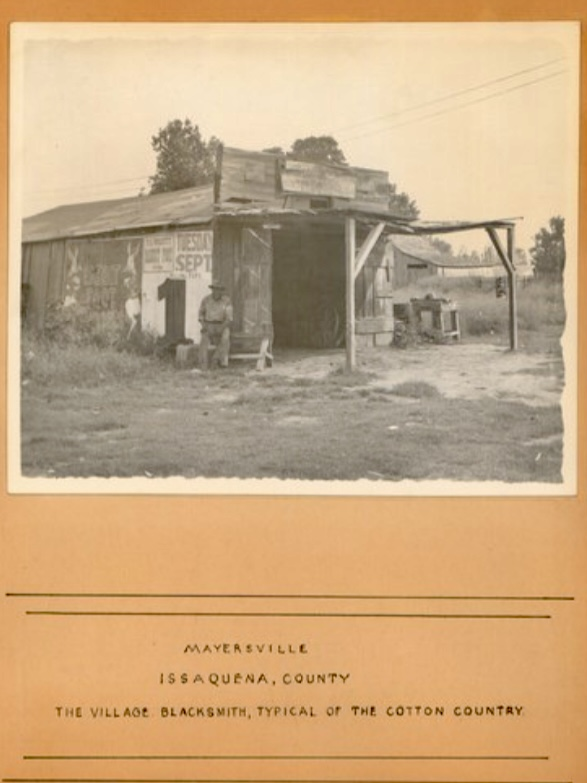
The village blacksmith, Mayersville, Issaquena County, Mississippi circa 1936

Native Americans had lived in this area since prehistoric times. The Mayersville Archeological Site, added to the National Register of Historic Places in 1980, is on privately owned land. It contains the remains of earthwork mounds constructed primarily in the Mayersville phase (AD 1200–1400) of the earlier Mississippian culture.

A 1950 survey by Philip Phillips of the Peabody Museum of Archaeology and Ethnology reported eleven ancient mounds. By the time the site was nominated by the state to the National Register of Historic Places, two mounds had been completely destroyed, a third one was nearly gone, three were reduced in size by plowing, and five remained nearly as described. Three mounds had enclosed a large plaza measuring roughly 560 by 790 feet (170 by 240 m). The fourth side was bounded by three mounds. Among these was Mound I, which was found to have been re-occupied from 1400 to 1600, perhaps by the succeeding Choctaw people. A European-American family cemetery associated with a 19th-century plantation was developed on Mound A.

The first record of non-Native settlement was in 1830, when European-American Ambrose Gipson purchased a large body of land along the Mississippi River and founded "Gipson's Landing". This soon became the port on the river for shipping out the cotton of Issaquena and Sharkey counties. It attracted shifting populations of river crews, gamblers, and traders, as well as show boats during low water times. The shipping records for David Mayer, who owned nearby Mout Level Plantation, show that river freight was shipped from the port via steamboat to points in Arkansas, Louisiana, Missouri, and Mississippi.

Mayer purchased Gipson's Landing in 1870, and the town of Mayersville was founded in 1871. The town was established in 1872 by the legislature as the Issaquena County seat.

In January 1885, black saloon keeper Ebenzer Fowler was rumored to have sent an insulting letter to a white woman in the town. An armed white posse confronted Fowler on the main street just before dark on January 30, 1885. They claimed that Fowler grabbed a gun from a posse member and fired a shot at them; they returned fire and shot him dead. Tension between the town's blacks, a majority of the population, and whites flared following the shooting. The county sheriff called in 22 members of Vicksburg's militia, the "Volunteer Southrons", for assistance. The militia left the following day when tensions had eased.

Mayersville's popularity as a shipping port began to decline in the mid-1800s when it had to compete with the railways being built across the South, though no railway was built to the town. The construction of a levee following the hugely destructive flood of 1927 cut off direct river access for the town, causing further decline. In the 21st century, Bunge North America operates a large grain port in Millers Landing north of town. In 1958, the current county courthouse in Mayersville was built.

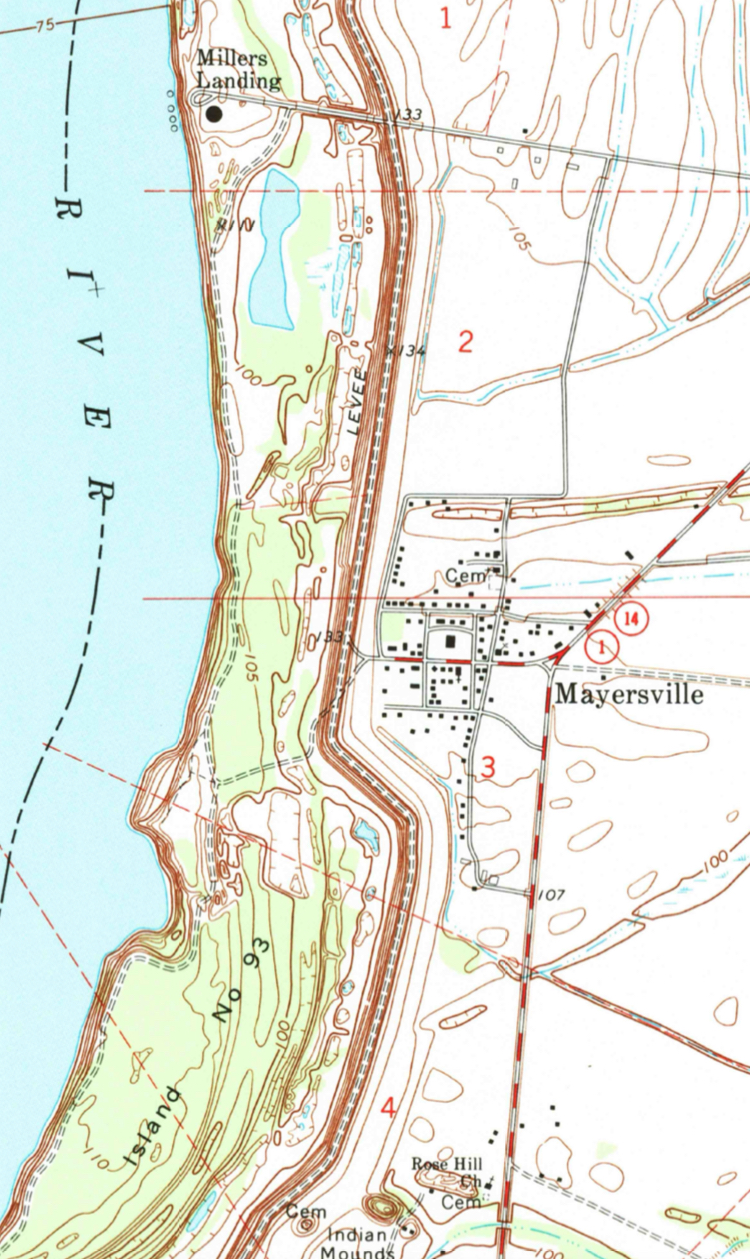
Mayersville, Mississippi, mapped by USGS in 1970

With federal legislation in the mid-1960s, African Americans regained the ability to register and vote. In 1976, famed civil rights activist Unita Blackwell was elected mayor of Mayersville and the first female African-American mayor in Mississippi.

Mayersville's small population and quiet character are in sharp contrast to its years as a booming Mississippi River port.

== Geography ==
Mayersville is in northern Issaquena County, just east of the Mississippi River, from which it is separated by a levee. Mississippi Highway 1 passes through the town, leading north 39 miles (63 km) to Greenville and south 22 miles (35 km) to U.S. Route 61 at Onward. Vicksburg is 53 miles (85 km) south of Mayersville via Highways 1 and 61. Mississippi Highway 14 has its western terminus in Mayersville and runs out of town to the northeast with Highway 1. Highway 14 leads east 11 miles (18 km) to US-61 at Rolling Fork.

According to the United States Census Bureau, the town of Mayersville has a total area of 1.1 square miles (2.9 km^{2}), all land.

== Demographics ==
Historical population
Census	Pop.	Note	%±
1880	355		—
1900	250		—
1910	185		−26.0%
1920	155		−16.2%
1930	136		−12.3%
1980	378		—
1990	329		−13.0%
2000	795		141.6%
2010	547		−31.2%
2020	433		−20.8%
U.S. Decennial Census

=== Racial and ethnic composition ===
Mayersville town, Mississippi – Racial and ethnic composition Note: the US Census treats Hispanic/Latino as an ethnic category. This table excludes Latinos from the racial categories and assigns them to a separate category. Hispanics/Latinos may be of any race.
Race / Ethnicity (NH = Non-Hispanic)	Pop 2000	Pop 2010	Pop 2020	% 2000	% 2010	% 2020
White alone (NH)	94	54	34	11.82%	9.87%	7.85%
Black or African American alone (NH)	700	488	292	88.05%	89.21%	67.44%
Native American or Alaska Native alone (NH)	0	0	1	0.00%	0.00%	0.23%
Asian alone (NH)	0	0	1	0.00%	0.00%	0.23%
Native Hawaiian or Pacific Islander alone (NH)	0	0	0	0.00%	0.00%	0.00%
Other race alone (NH)	0	0	1	0.00%	0.00%	0.23%
Mixed race or Multiracial (NH)	0	1	1	0.00%	0.18%	0.23%
Hispanic or Latino (any race)	1	4	103	0.13%	0.73%	23.79%
Total	795	547	433	100.00%	100.00%	100.00%

=== 2020 census ===
As of the 2020 United States census, there were 433 people, 155 households, and 66 families residing in the town.

=== 2013 ACS ===
As of the 2013 American Community Survey, there were 652 people living in the town, a decline since 2000. The remaining population is increasingly African American. 90.2% were African American, 9.7% White and 0.2% from some other race. 0.2% were Hispanic or Latino of any race.

=== 2000 census ===
As of the census of 2000, there were 795 people, 190 households, and 126 families living in the town. The population density was 710.7 inhabitants per square mile (274.4/km^{2}). There were 212 housing units at an average density of 189.5 per square mile (73.2/km^{2}). The racial makeup of the town was 88.05% Black or African American, 11.95% White, and 0.13% Hispanic or Latino.

There were 190 households, out of which 40.5% had children under the age of 18 living with them, 26.3% were married couples living together, 31.1% had a female householder with no husband present, and 33.2% were non-families. 31.1% of all households were made up of individuals, and 13.7% had someone living alone who was 65 years of age or older. The average household size was 2.80 and the average family size was 3.53.

In the town, the population was spread out, with 26.4% under the age of 18, 16.0% from 18 to 24, 36.9% from 25 to 44, 13.7% from 45 to 64, and 7.0% who were 65 years of age or older. The median age was 29 years. For every 100 females, there were 165.9 males. For every 100 females age 18 and over, there were 228.7 males.

The median income for a household in the town was $10,962, and the median income for a family was $15,208. Males had a median income of $20,917 versus $15,875 for females. The per capita income for the town was $7,287. About 41.6% of families and 49.9% of the population were below the poverty line, including 62.6% of those under age 18 and 51.4% of those age 65 or over.

== Education ==
The town of Mayersville is served by the South Delta School District.

== Notable people ==
- Unita Blackwell, civil rights leader and mayor of Mayersville from 1976-2001; first female African-American mayor in Mississippi.
- Hazlewood Power Farish, Mississippi state senator from 1908 to 1912
- William Stamps Farish II, president of Standard Oil.
- Anthony Harris, professional football defensive tackle
- Elza Jeffords, U.S. Representative from Mississippi's 3rd congressional district from 1883 to 1885
