= Round Lake, Mississippi =

- Unincorporated community
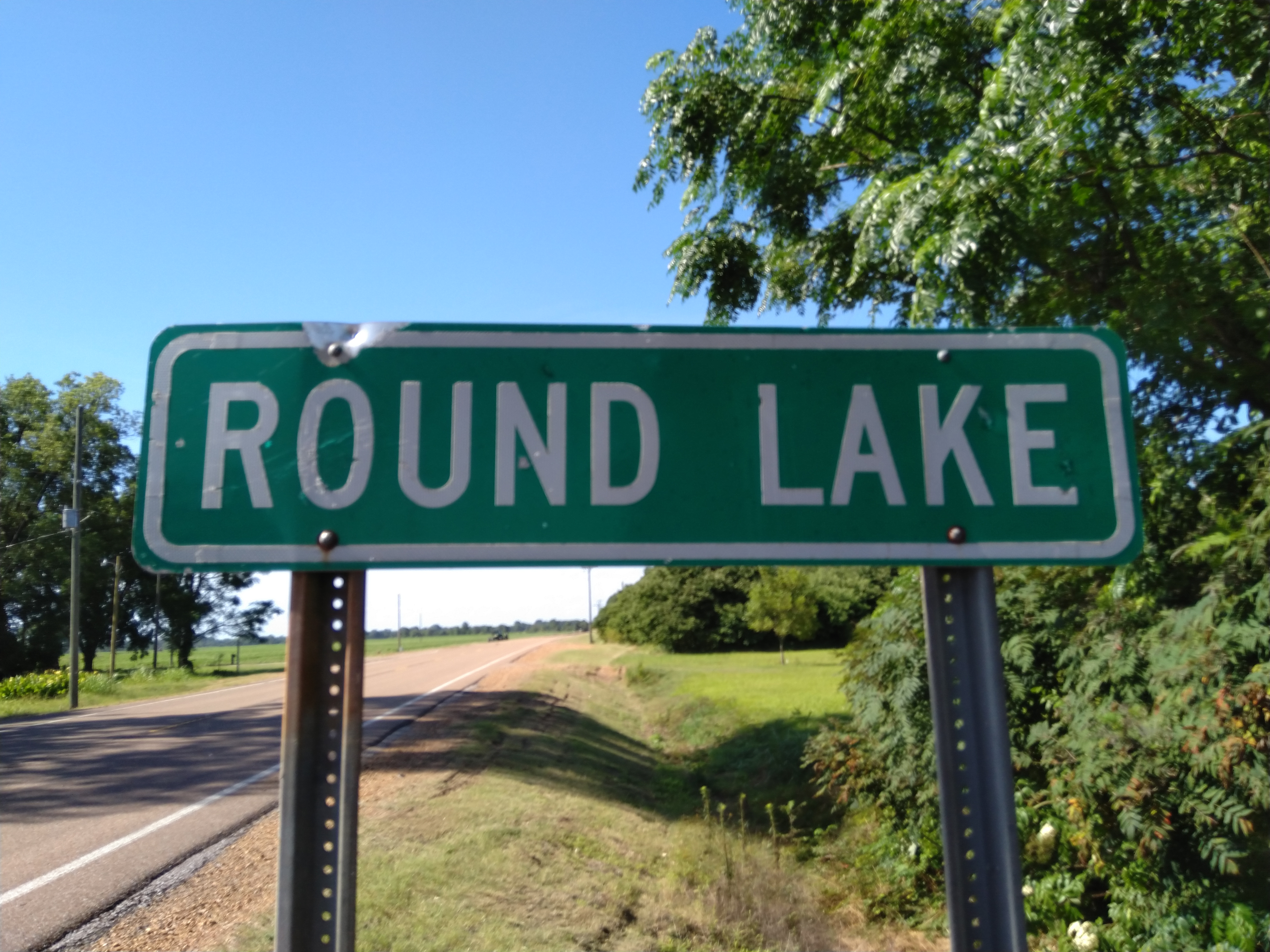
- Highway sign in Round Lake

- Location within Mississippi Location within the United States
- Coordinates: 34°03′12″N 90°51′10″W
- Country: United States
- State: Mississippi
- County: Bolivar
- Elevation: 161 ft (49 m)
- Time zone: UTC-6 (Central (CST))
  - Summer (DST): UTC-5 (CDT)
- ZIP code: 38746
- Area code: 662
- GNIS feature ID: 67691

Round Lake, also spelled Roundlake, is an unincorporated community located in Bolivar County, Mississippi, United States along Mississippi Highway 1. Round Lake is approximately 7 miles (11 km) west of Duncan and approximately 2 miles (3.2 km) north of Deeson. Round Lake is located on the former Yazoo and Mississippi Valley Railroad. Round Lake was formerly home to three general stores and two grocery stores.

A post office operated under the name Roundlake from 1891 to 1968.
