= Mississippi Highway 448 =

State highway in Mississippi

Mississippi Highway 448

Route information
- Maintained by MDOT
- Length: 31.015 mi (49.914 km)
- Existed: 1953–present

Major junctions
- West end: MS 1 in Benoit
- US 61 / US 278 in Shaw
- East end: US 82 in Indianola

Location
- Country: United States
- State: Mississippi
- Counties: Bolivar, Sunflower

Highway system
- Mississippi State Highway System; Interstate; US; State
← MS 446	→ MS 450

Mississippi Highway 448 (MS 448) is a state highway through the Mississippi Delta region of Mississippi. Traveling through Bolivar and Smith counties, it travels for about 31 miles (50 km) through the agricultural fields of the Delta.

== Route description ==
MS 448 begins in the center of Benoit, a town in Bolivar County. The intersecting road at MS 448's western terminus is MS 1 which also carries the Great River Road. Heading southeast, crossing an abandoned railroad, the highway heads through a residential neighborhood along Preston Street. After leaving town, the highway heads through flat agricultural fields. Around Saw Grass Lake, MS 448 curves to a more easterly course. The road crosses a few bayous before reaching the city of Shaw. Going through Shaw on Peeler Avenue, it mostly heads past small houses except in the center of the city where the road crosses an abandoned railroad surrounded by commercial buildings. Towards the east side of Shaw, MS 448 intersects U.S. Route 61 (US 61) and US 278 at a signalized intersection.

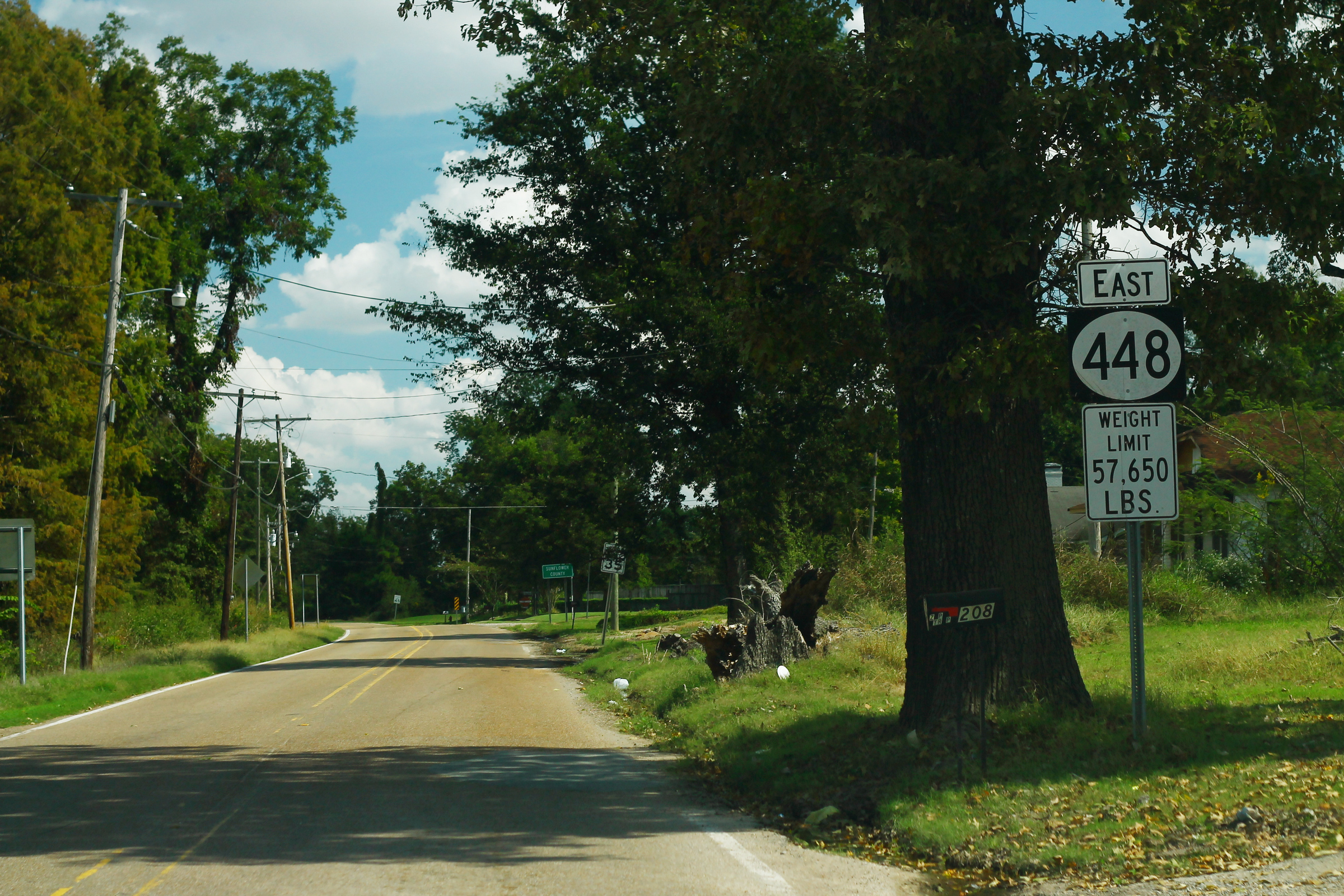
MS 448 east in Shaw approaching the Bolivar-Sunflower county line

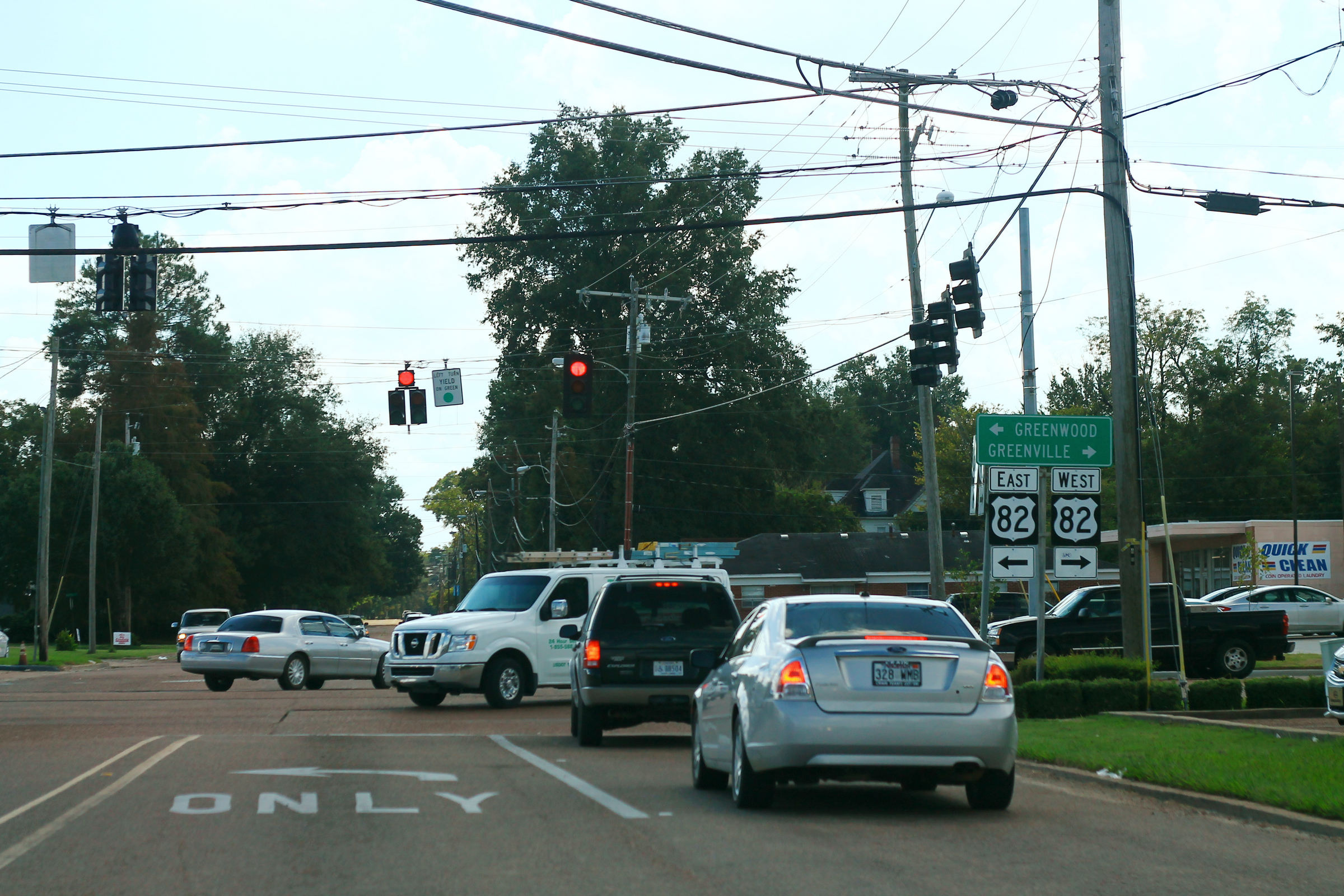
MS 448's eastern terminus at US 82 in Indianola

One block east of US 61/US 278, MS 448 crosses into Sunflower County, though still officially within the Shaw city limits. The road parallels Silver Bayou as it exits the city heading east. The road comes to an intersection with MS 442 at its western terminus. Here, MS 448 turns to the south to head through farm fields. The road soon curves to the southeast, crosses Porter Bayou, and turns east. Before crossing Porter Bayou again, at the community of Stephenville, MS 448 turns more to the south passing farms on its west and woods, some houses, and businesses on the east. MS 448 also intersects the access road to Indianola Municipal Airport. Continuing south, the road enters the city of Indianola on Sunflower Street where it passes a residential neighborhood and some churches. The highway ends at an intersection with US 82 though Sunflower Avenue continues south.

== History ==
An unimproved state highway was created between Benoit and Shaw in 1951, however it was not numbered at the time of its creation. By 1953, the road had been assigned the number of MS 448 and was extended to Indianola. The only major change to the road made since then was its full length being paved by 1960.

== Major intersections ==
County	Location	mi	km	Destinations	Notes
Bolivar	Benoit	0.000	0.000	MS 1 / Great River Road / Reston Street – Greenville, Clarksdale	Western terminus
Bolivar	Shaw	16.391	26.379	US 61 / US 278 – Cleveland, Leland	
Sunflower		17.537	28.223	MS 442 east – Doddsville	Western terminus of MS 442
Sunflower	Indianola	31.015	49.914	US 82 / Sunflower Avenue – Greenwood, Greenville	Eastern terminus
1.000 mi = 1.609 km; 1.000 km = 0.621 mi
