= Lula, Mississippi =

- Town
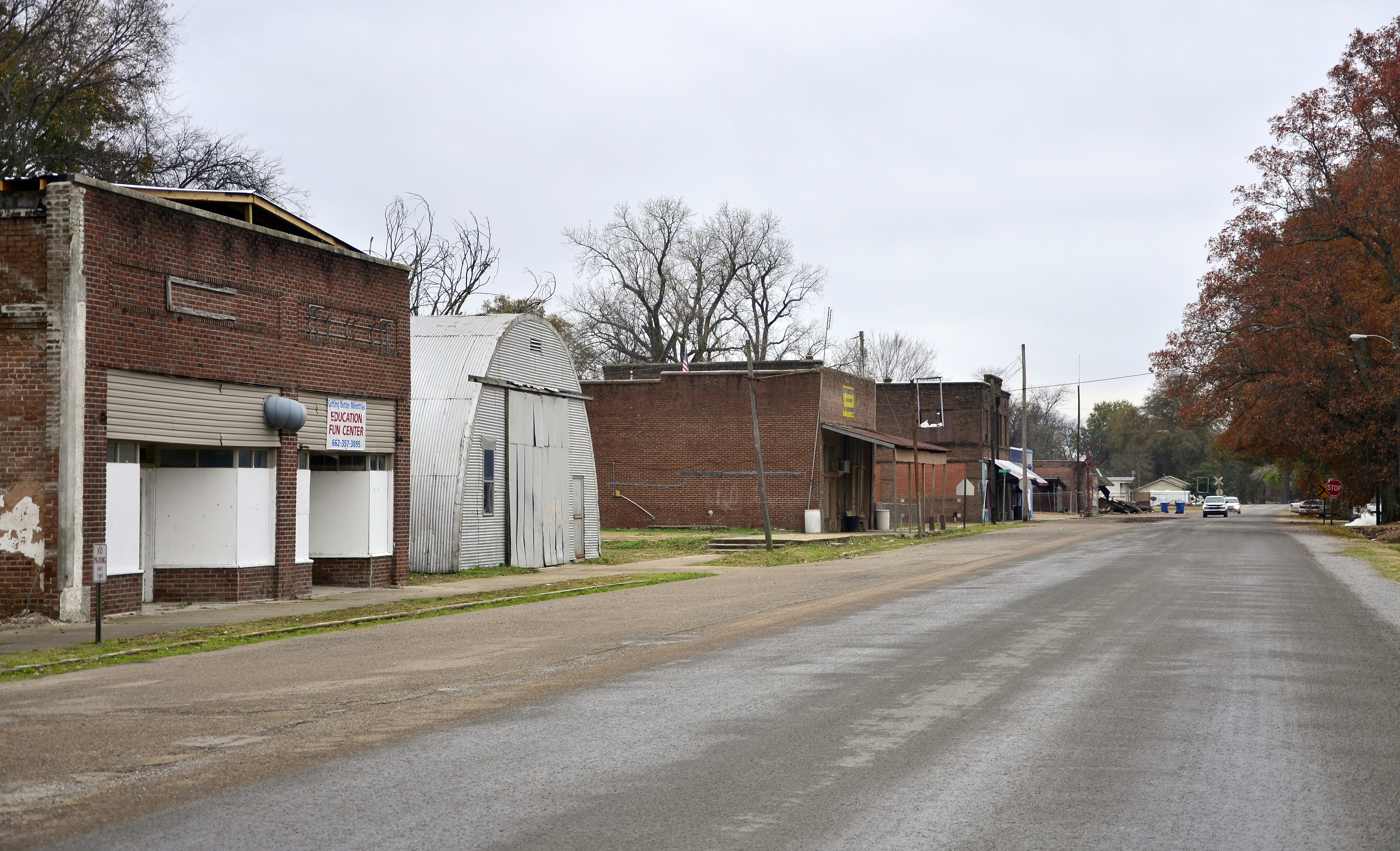
- South Front Avenue in Lula

- Location of Lula, Mississippi

- Location in the United States
- Coordinates: 34°27′16″N 90°28′40″W
- Country: United States
- State: Mississippi
- County: Coahoma
- Chartered: February 24, 1890

Area
  - Total: 0.42 sq mi (1.08 km^{2})
  - Land: 0.42 sq mi (1.08 km^{2})
  - Water: 0 sq mi (0.00 km^{2})
- Elevation: 180 ft (55 m)

Population (2020)
  - Total: 204
  - Density: 488.7/sq mi (188.67/km^{2})
- Time zone: UTC-6 (Central (CST))
  - Summer (DST): UTC-5 (CDT)
- ZIP code: 38644
- Area code: 662
- FIPS code: 28-42600
- GNIS feature ID: 2406057

Lula is a town in Coahoma County, Mississippi, United States. Per the 2020 census, the population was 204.

== History ==
The town of Lula was chartered by the state of Mississippi on February 24, 1890 and platted a few years prior, when the Louisville, New Orleans, and Texas Railroad built a line through the area in 1884.

=== Tornado ===
On April 26, 2011, a tornado—part of the 2011 Super Outbreak—traveled from Elaine, Arkansas, to Lula. The tornado was rated EF0, with estimated wind speeds of 75 mph (121 km/h; 65 kn). The tornado's path of destruction was 200 yards (180 m) wide and the tornado travelled a path of 21.5 miles (34.6 km) along Highway 61. The tornado ripped the roof off a church near Lula.

== Geography ==
Lula is located near the northern border of Coahoma County. U.S. Route 49 passes southwest of the town, and U.S. Route 61 passes east of the town. US 49 leads northwest 10 miles (16 km) to Helena, Arkansas, while US 61 leads north 18 miles (29 km) to Tunica. Southbound, the two highways join and lead to Clarksdale, the Coahoma county seat, 20 miles (32 km) south of Lula.

According to the United States Census Bureau, the town has a total area of 0.39 square miles (1.0 km^{2}), all land.

== Demographics ==
Historical population
Census	Pop.	Note	%±
1900	174		—
1910	160		−8.0%
1920	344		115.0%
1930	448		30.2%
1940	503		12.3%
1950	488		−3.0%
1960	484		−0.8%
1970	445		−8.1%
1980	394		−11.5%
1990	224		−43.1%
2000	370		65.2%
2010	298		−19.5%
2020	204		−31.5%
U.S. Decennial Census; 2010 2020

=== Racial and ethnic composition ===
Lula town, Mississippi – Racial and ethnic composition Note: the US Census treats Hispanic/Latino as an ethnic category. This table excludes Latinos from the racial categories and assigns them to a separate category. Hispanics/Latinos may be of any race.
Race / Ethnicity (NH = Non-Hispanic)	Pop 2000	Pop 2010	Pop 2020	% 2000	% 2010	% 2020
White alone (NH)	73	55	27	19.73%	18.46%	13.24%
Black or African American alone (NH)	286	232	169	77.30%	77.85%	82.84%
Native American or Alaska Native alone (NH)	0	0	0	0.00%	0.00%	0.00%
Asian alone (NH)	7	6	0	1.89%	2.01%	0.00%
Native Hawaiian or Pacific Islander alone (NH)	0	0	0	0.00%	0.00%	0.00%
Other race alone (NH)	0	0	0	0.00%	0.00%	0.00%
Mixed race or Multiracial (NH)	4	2	7	1.08%	0.67%	3.43%
Hispanic or Latino (any race)	0	3	1	0.00%	1.01%	0.49%
Total	370	298	204	100.00%	100.00%	100.00%

=== 2000 Census ===
At the 2000 census, there were 370 people, 134 households and 84 families residing in the town. The population density was 888.3 inhabitants per square mile (343.0/km^{2}). There were 142 housing units at an average density of 340.9 per square mile (131.6/km^{2}). The racial makeup was 77.30% African American, 19.73% White, 1.89% Asian, and 1.08% from two or more races.

There were 134 households, of which 28.4% had children under the age of 18 living with them, 32.8% were married couples living together, 25.4% had a female householder with no husband present, and 37.3% were non-families. 35.1% of all households were made up of individuals, and 24.6% had someone living alone who was 65 years of age or older. The average household size was 2.76 and the average family size was 3.58.

30.8% of the population were under the age of 18, 9.5% from 18 to 24, 22.7% from 25 to 44, 16.8% from 45 to 64, and 20.3% who were 65 years of age or older. The median age was 33 years. For every 100 females, there were 93.7 males. For every 100 females age 18 and over, there were 85.5 males.

The median household income was $23,125 and the median family income was $33,295. Males had a median income of $26,944 and females $19,318. The per capita income was $12,008. About 35.6% of families and 39.3% of the population were below the poverty line, including 59.1% of those under age 18 and 39.2% of those age 65 or over.

== Education ==
The town of Lula is served by the Coahoma County School District. Residents are served by Coahoma County Junior-Senior High School.

== Notable people ==
- Rex Armistead, former investigator of the Mississippi State Sovereignty Commission
- Unita Blackwell, civil rights activist
- Sam Carr, blues drummer
- Maud Jeffries, actress
- Ransom A. Myers, marine biologist
- Bertha Lee Pate, blues singer
