= Sherard, Mississippi =

- Unincorporated community
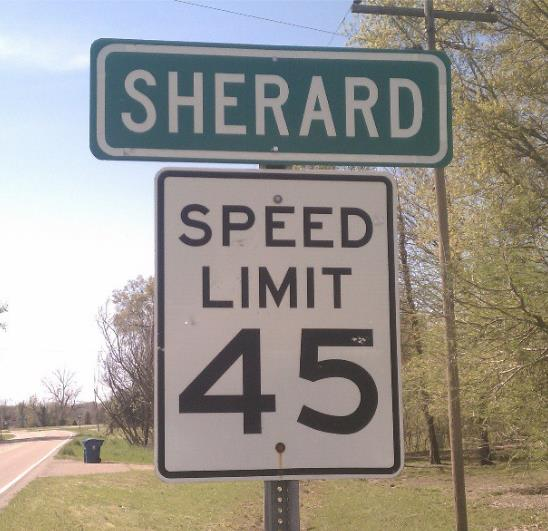
- Sign just outside of Sherard on Mississippi Highway 322

- Location within Mississippi Location within the United States
- Coordinates: 34°12′56″N 90°42′22″W
- Country: United States
- State: Mississippi
- County: Coahoma
- Elevation: 160 ft (50 m)
- Time zone: UTC-6 (Central (CST))
  - Summer (DST): UTC-5 (CDT)
- ZIP code: 38669
- Area code: 662
- GNIS feature ID: 677650

Sherard is an unincorporated community located in Coahoma County, Mississippi, United States. Sherard is located along Mississippi Highway 1, 6 miles (9.7 km) west of Clarksdale.

== History ==
Sherard is named for the Sherard family, who cleared the land for a plantation in 1874. The plantation originally had two cotton gins, a saw mill, and pecan processing equipment. Sherard is located on the former Yazoo and Mississippi Valley Railroad and in 1910 was home to four general stores and the Memphis Shingle Company. A post office first began operation under the name Sherard in 1890. The first recordings of McKinley Morganfield aka Muddy Waters were recorded at the Sherad Post Office & General Store as part of is Mississippi Delta Survey of 1941-42.

Sherard is served by the Coahoma County School District. Residents are served by Sherard Elementary School and Coahoma County Junior-Senior High School.

A cultivar of pecan known as Sherard was developed in Sherard in 1916.

== Notable person ==
- Lewis C. Hudson, Brigadier General in the Marine Corps, lived in Sherard in the 1920s.
