= Mississippi Highway 442 =

State highway in Mississippi

Mississippi Highway 442

Route information
- Maintained by MDOT
- Length: 30.777 mi (49.531 km)
- Existed: 1950–present

Major junctions
- West end: MS 448 near Shaw
- US 49W in Doddsville
- East end: US 49E near Schlater

Location
- Country: United States
- State: Mississippi
- Counties: Sunflower, Leflore

Highway system
- Mississippi State Highway System; Interstate; US; State
← MS 440	→ MS 444

Mississippi Highway 442 (MS 442) is a state highway in the U.S. state of Mississippi that runs 30.8 miles (49.6 km) through agricultural lands of the Mississippi Delta region. The highway connects the city of Shaw at MS 448 to U.S. Route 49E (US 49E) to the east of Schlater.

== Route description ==
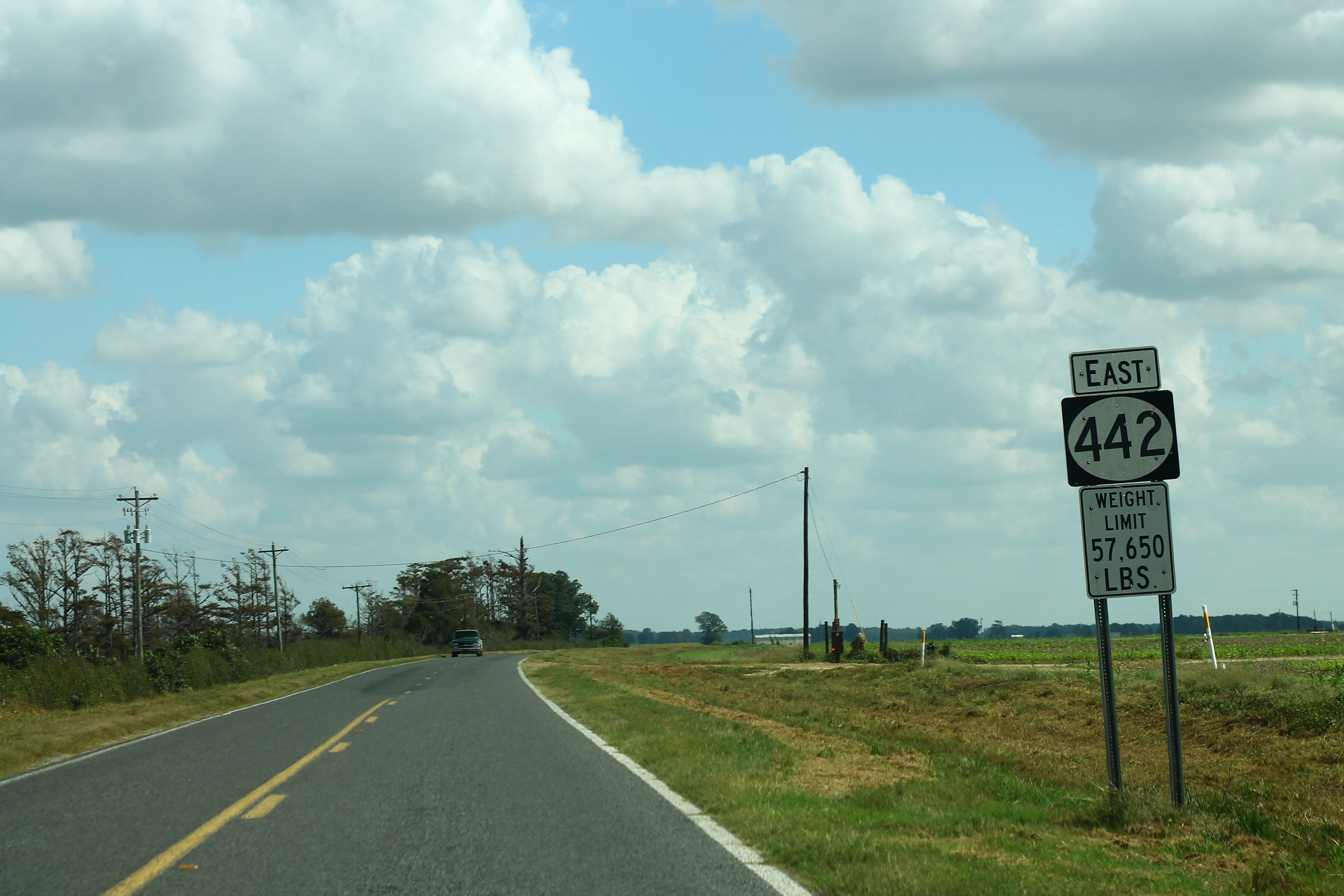
Eastbound MS 442 after its western terminus

MS 442 begins at a T-intersection with MS 448 less than one mile (1.6 km) east of the city limits of Shaw. MS 448 heads west and south from this point where MS 442 heads east paralleling Porter Bayou and later Fox Bayou. The highway heads through mostly agricultural lands. At the community of Steiner, the road hooks to the northeast, then to the northwest, before turning to due north for about two miles (3.2 km). At the community of Linn, the road crosses Jones Bayou and curves to the east. MS 442 generally heads east at this point, except for it making a pair of sharp almost 90-degree bends before crossing the Sunflower River. About 8/10 mile (1.3 km) after crossing the river, MS 442 reaches a stop-controlled T-intersection with US 49W just inside the town limits of Doddsville.

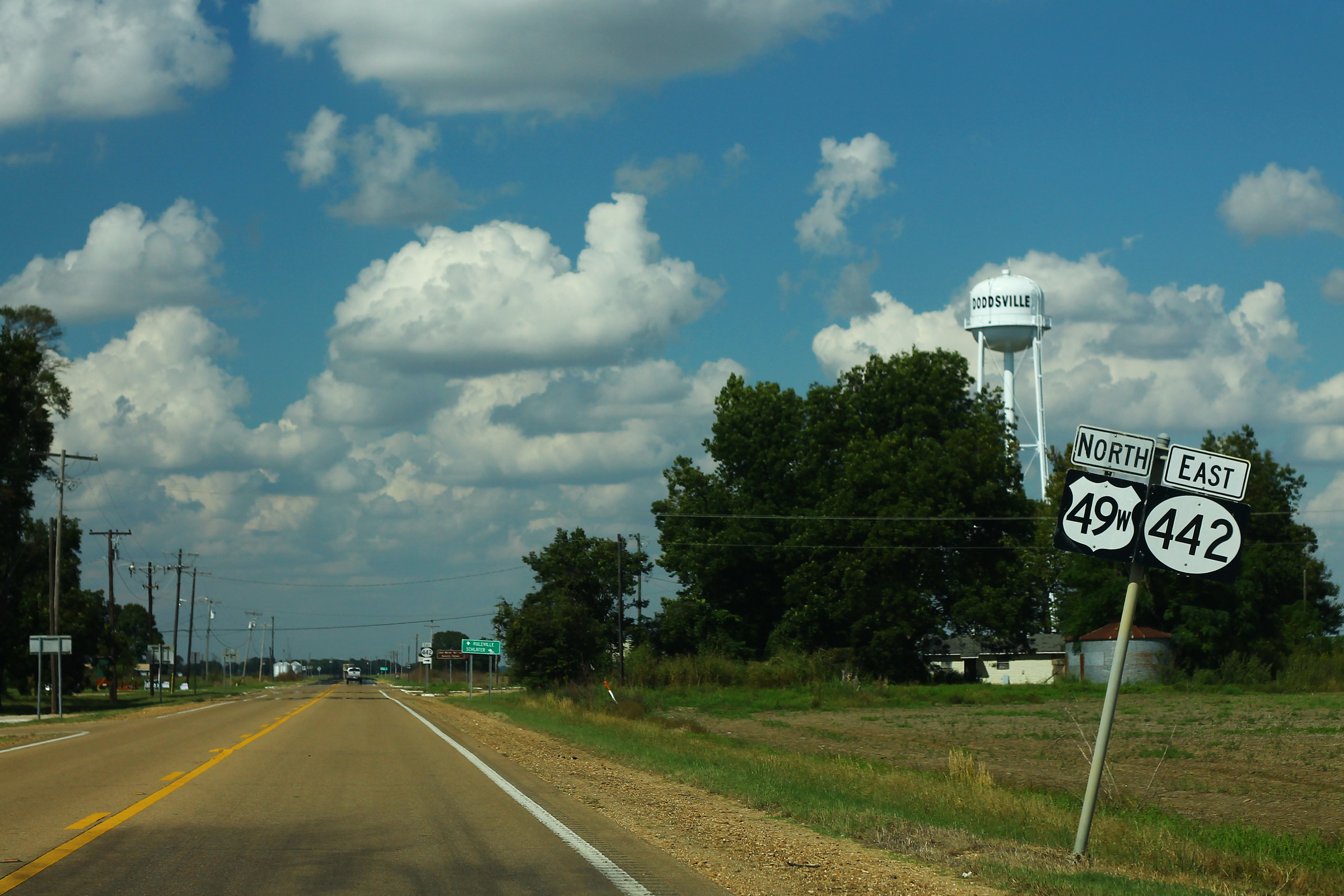
Along the US 49W / MS 442 concurrency in Doddsville

At the aforementioned intersection, MS 442 and US 49W form a concurrency that heads north through Doddsville for about 0.2 miles (0.32 km) before reaching a four-way intersection at 5th Avenue. The unsigned MS 832 heads west from this point while MS 442 heads east. The state highway heads past small houses with trees surrounding the area. As the road leaves the town limits, farms begin to line the road again. MS 442 turns to the southeast paralleling Pecan Bayou then curves to the east again to cross from Sunflower County into Leflore County. The road crosses Quiver River and then heads through the town of Schlater. Going through town on First Avenue, the road mostly passes houses and a few small businesses and a post office. MS 442 heads through the Ashland Brake, a narrow wooded area that was formerly part of a river, before going through farmland again. In a rural area, MS 442 ends at a T-intersection with US 49E.

== History ==
A state maintained road had existed between Doddsville and US 49E since about 1932. The road originally was unimproved and took a winding course around the bayous and impounded natural features. By 1939, a straighter alignment of the road was built and was truncated slightly west due to a new alignment of US 49E being constructed. The Leflore County portion of the road was paved in 1940 and the remaining portion in Sunflower County was paved in 1942. The MS 442 designation was created in 1950 for this stretch of road. In 1957, the highway was extended west towards Shaw on an unimproved road. By 1960, the western extension had been paved. There have been no major changes to the highway since then.

== Major intersections ==
County	Location	mi	km	Destinations	Notes
Sunflower		0.000	0.000	MS 448 – Shaw, Indianola	Western terminus
Sunflower	Doddsville	16.797	27.032	US 49W south – Indianola	Western end of US 49W concurrency
Sunflower	Doddsville	17.006	27.369	US 49W north / MS 832 west (5th Avenue) – Ruleville	Eastern end of US 49W concurrency; eastern terminus of MS 832
Leflore		30.777	49.531	US 49E – Clarksdale, Greenwood	Eastern terminus
1.000 mi = 1.609 km; 1.000 km = 0.621 mi: Concurrency terminus
