= Deeson, Mississippi =

- Unincorporated community
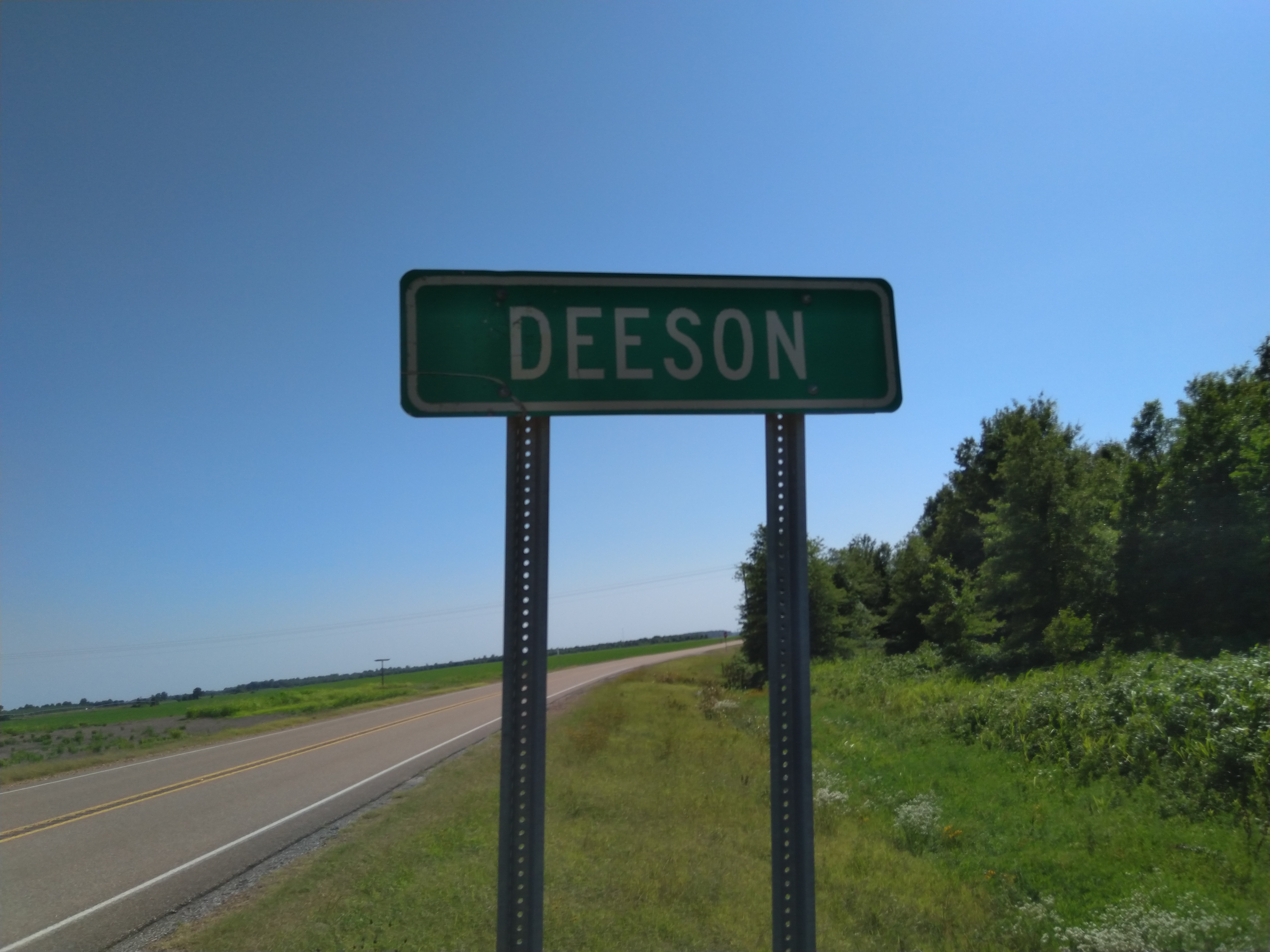
- Highway sign in Deeson

- Location within Mississippi Location within the United States
- Coordinates: 34°01′23″N 90°51′34″W
- Country: United States
- State: Mississippi
- County: Bolivar
- Elevation: 161 ft (49 m)
- Time zone: UTC-6 (Central (CST))
  - Summer (DST): UTC-5 (CDT)
- ZIP code: 38740
- Area code: 662
- GNIS feature ID: 669211

Deeson is an unincorporated community located in Bolivar County, Mississippi, United States along Mississippi Highway 1. Deeson is approximately 11 miles (18 km) south of Rena Lara and approximately 8 miles (13 km) north of Gunnison.

Deeson's population was 110 in 1900. It was noted in 1907 that Deeson had a money order post office, and a large cotton seed oil mill. A post office operated under the name Deeson from 1896 to 1959.
