= Onward, Mississippi =

- Unincorporated community
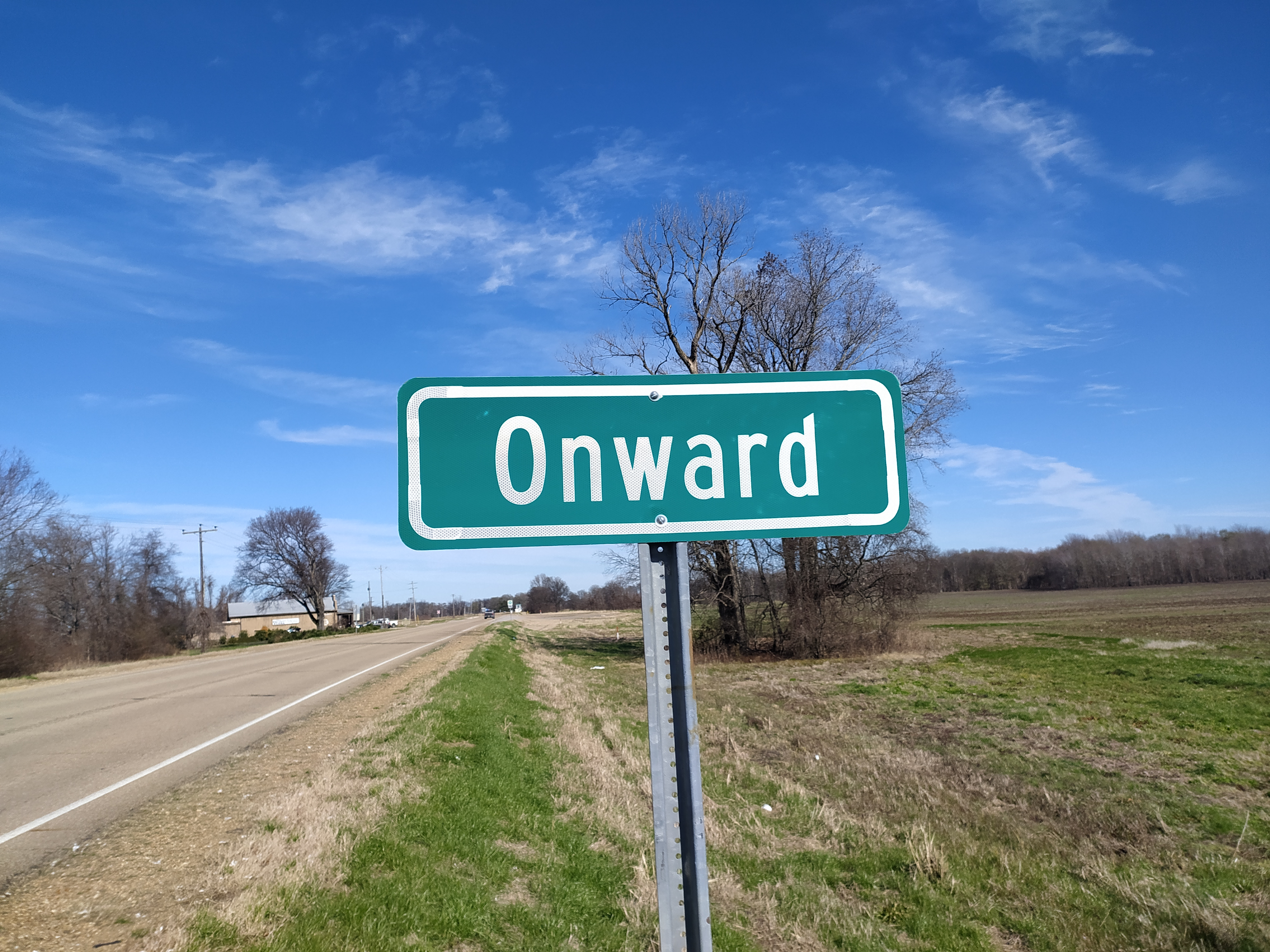
- Highway Sign in Onward

- Location within Mississippi Location within the United States
- Coordinates: 32°43′31″N 90°56′31″W
- Country: United States
- State: Mississippi
- County: Sharkey
- Elevation: 102 ft (31 m)
- Time zone: UTC-6 (Central (CST))
  - Summer (DST): UTC-5 (CDT)
- ZIP code: 39159
- Area code: 662
- GNIS feature ID: 675291

Onward is an unincorporated community located in Sharkey County, Mississippi. The junction of Mississippi Highway 1 and U.S. Route 61 is located here.In fact it is the south end of MH1. Onward is approximately 6 miles (9.7 km) south of Cary and approximately 9 miles (14 km) north of Valley Park.

Onward had a post office from about 1879 to 1975, but it closed after population decline. The post office was housed in Onward Store in the early to mid-twentieth century.

A state historical highway marker on the grounds of Onward Store commemorates the creation of the Teddy Bear. In 1902, former United States President Theodore Roosevelt was on a bear hunt at nearby Smedes Plantation. He refused to shoot a captive bear, and political cartoonists commented on this. The events inspired the creation of the Teddy Bear stuffed toy, named after Roosevelt.

A map from 1873 shows Onward located approximately 0.4 mi (0.64 km) west of its current location, at the confluence of Black Bayou and Deer Creek, with the towns of "Reality" and "Good Intent" located to the south. The settlement likely moved to avoid flooding of those waterways.

== Gallery ==
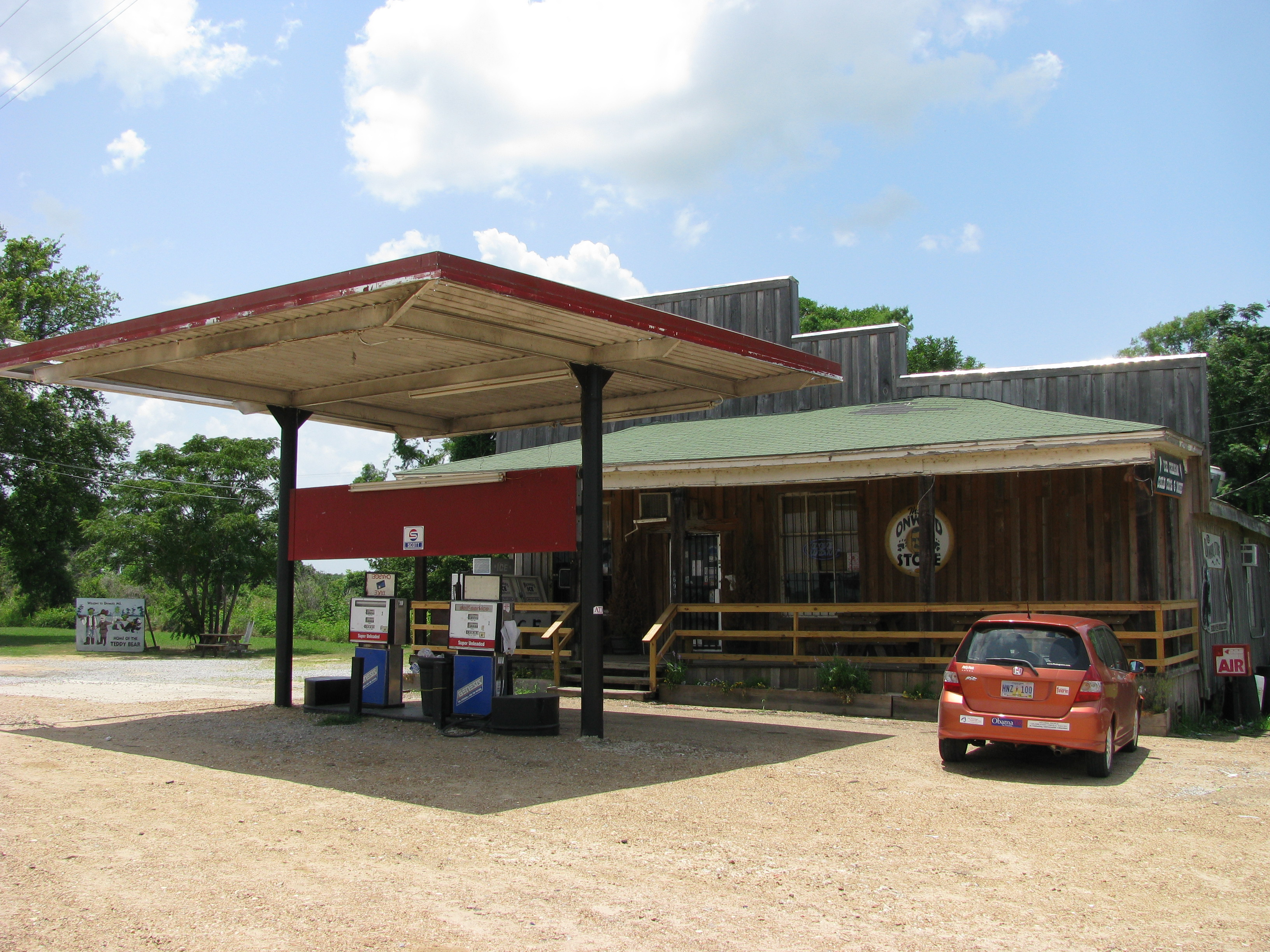
Onward Store
