= Kinlock, Mississippi =

- Unincorporated community
- Location within Mississippi Location within the United States
- Coordinates: 33°18′34″N 90°42′27″W
- Country: United States
- State: Mississippi
- County: Sunflower
- Elevation: 118 ft (36 m)
- Time zone: UTC-6 (Central (CST))
  - Summer (DST): UTC-5 (CDT)
- ZIP code: 38751
- Area code: 662
- GNIS feature ID: 691982

Kinlock is an unincorporated community located in Sunflower County, Mississippi, near the Sunflower County/Washington County border. Kinlock is approximately 12 miles (19 km) south of Indianola and 8 miles (13 km) southwest of Inverness.

A post office operated under the name Kinlock from 1879 to 1882.
