= Coahoma, Mississippi =

Coahoma
- Town
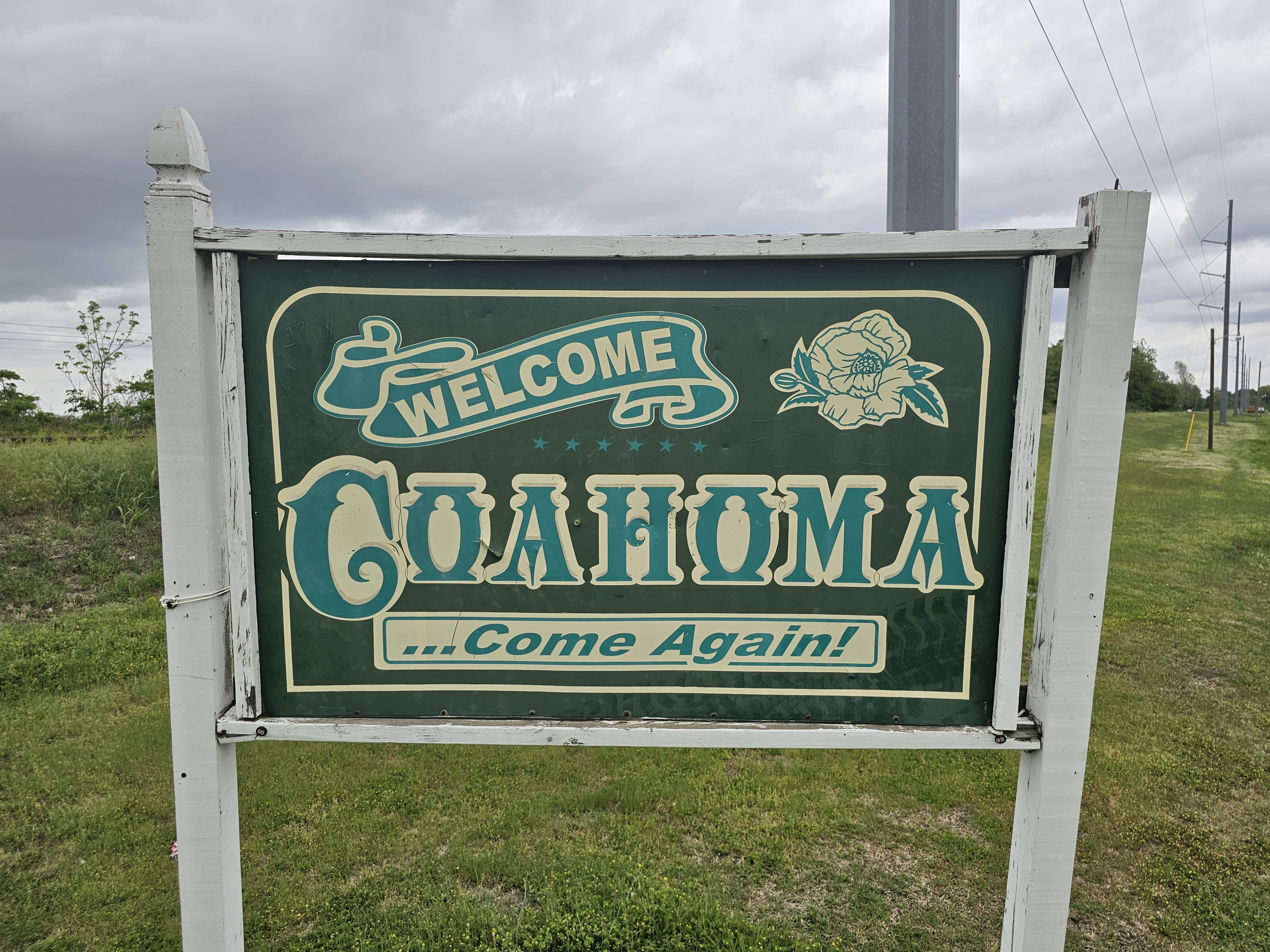

- Location of Coahoma, Mississippi

- Location in the United States
- Coordinates: 34°21′59″N 90°31′19″W
- Country: United States
- State: Mississippi
- County: Coahoma

Area
  - Total: 0.20 sq mi (0.51 km^{2})
  - Land: 0.20 sq mi (0.51 km^{2})
  - Water: 0 sq mi (0.00 km^{2})
- Elevation: 177 ft (54 m)

Population (2020)
  - Total: 229
  - Density: 1,171.1/sq mi (452.15/km^{2})
- Time zone: UTC-6 (Central (CST))
  - Summer (DST): UTC-5 (CDT)
- ZIP code: 38617
- Area code: 662
- FIPS code: 28-14580
- GNIS feature ID: 2406285

Coahoma is a town in Coahoma County, Mississippi, United States. Per the 2020 census, the population was 229.

== History ==
Coahoma was founded in the 1880s, and named for its location within Coahoma County.

Coahoma was a stop on the Mississippi Delta Railroad, completed in 1884.

== Geography ==
Coahoma is north of Friar Point Road, 2 miles (3 km) west of U.S. Route 61 and 6 miles (10 km) east of the town of Friars Point on the Mississippi River.

According to the United States Census Bureau, Coahoma has a total area of 0.19 square miles (0.5 km^{2}), all land.

== Demographics ==
Historical population
Census	Pop.	Note	%±
1900	171		—
1910	211		23.4%
1990	254		—
2000	325		28.0%
2010	377		16.0%
2020	229		−39.3%
U.S. Decennial Census; 2010 2020

=== Racial and ethnic composition ===
Coahoma town, Mississippi – Racial and ethnic composition Note: the US Census treats Hispanic/Latino as an ethnic category. This table excludes Latinos from the racial categories and assigns them to a separate category. Hispanics/Latinos may be of any race.
Race / Ethnicity (NH = Non-Hispanic)	Pop 2000	Pop 2010	Pop 2020	% 2000	% 2010	% 2020
White alone (NH)	5	3	2	1.54%	0.80%	0.87%
Black or African American alone (NH)	319	374	226	98.15%	99.20%	98.69%
Native American or Alaska Native alone (NH)	0	0	1	0.00%	0.00%	0.44%
Asian alone (NH)	0	0	0	0.00%	0.00%	0.00%
Native Hawaiian or Pacific Islander alone (NH)	0	0	0	0.00%	0.00%	0.00%
Other race alone (NH)	0	0	0	0.00%	0.00%	0.00%
Mixed race or Multiracial (NH)	1	0	0	0.31%	0.00%	0.00%
Hispanic or Latino (any race)	0	0	0	0.00%	0.00%	0.00%
Total	325	377	229	100.00%	100.00%	100.00%

=== 2010 Census ===
As of the 2010 United States census, there were 377 people living in the town. 99.2% were African American and 0.8% White.

As of the census of 2000, there were 325 people, 110 households, and 74 families living in the town. The population density was 3,663.5 inhabitants per square mile (1,414.5/km^{2}). There were 123 housing units at an average density of 1,386.5 per square mile (535.3/km^{2}). The racial makeup of the town was 98.2% African American, 1.5% White and 0.3% from two or more races.

There were 110 households, out of which 40.9% had children under the age of 18 living with them, 14.5% were married couples living together, 45.5% had a female householder with no husband present, and 32.7% were non-families. 29.1% of all households were made up of individuals, and 14.5% had someone living alone who was 65 years of age or older. The average household size was 2.95 and the average family size was 3.65.

In the town, the population was spread out, with 41.8% under the age of 18, 9.2% from 18 to 24, 28.3% from 25 to 44, 10.8% from 45 to 64, and 9.8% who were 65 years of age or older. The median age was 23 years. For every 100 females, there were 92.9 males. For every 100 females age 18 and over, there were 77.5 males.

The median income for a household in the town was $11,882, and the median income for a family was $12,327. Males had a median income of $17,625 versus $13,250 for females. The per capita income for the town was $4,840. About 55.6% of families and 55.3% of the population were below the poverty line, including 63.9% of those under age 18 and 73.5% of those age 65 or over.

== Education ==
The town is served by the Coahoma County School District. Residents are served by Coahoma County Junior-Senior High School.

== Notable people ==
- Charles Hardy Carr, U.S. federal judge
- James Carr, musician
- Charles C. Cordill, Louisiana state senator from Tensas Parish from 1884 to 1916
- Frank Montgomery Hull (1901-1982), Entomologist
- Herb McMath, professional football player
