= Mississippi Highway 450 =

Highway in Bolivar County, Mississippi, United States

Mississippi Highway 450
- MS 450 highlighted in red

Route information
- Maintained by MDOT
- Length: 17.807 mi (28.658 km)
- Existed: 1956–present

Major junctions
- West end: MS 1 / Great River Road south of Scott
- East end: US 61 / US 278 east of Choctaw

Location
- Country: United States
- State: Mississippi
- Counties: Bolivar

Highway system
- Mississippi State Highway System; Interstate; US; State
← MS 448	→ MS 454

Mississippi Highway 450 (MS 450) is a 17.807-mile (28.658 km) state highway in Bolivar County, Mississippi, United States, that connects Mississippi Highway 1 (MS 1), south of Scott, with U.S. Route 61 / U.S. Route 278 (US 61 / US 278), east of Choctaw. It was designated in 1956, starting at MS 1 south of Scott and ending at Choctaw. Starting in 1962, the section near Stringtown was rerouted significantly. The last realignment was in 1974, where the section near Stringtown was straightened, and US 61 moved east of Choctaw.

== Route description ==
MS 450 is located in southern Bolivar County, and is maintained by the Mississippi Department of Transportation (MDOT). In 2013, MDOT calculated as many as 720 vehicles traveling east of Love Johnson Road, and as few as 190 vehicles traveling east of Deer Creek Drive. MS 450 is legally defined in Mississippi Code § 65-3-3.

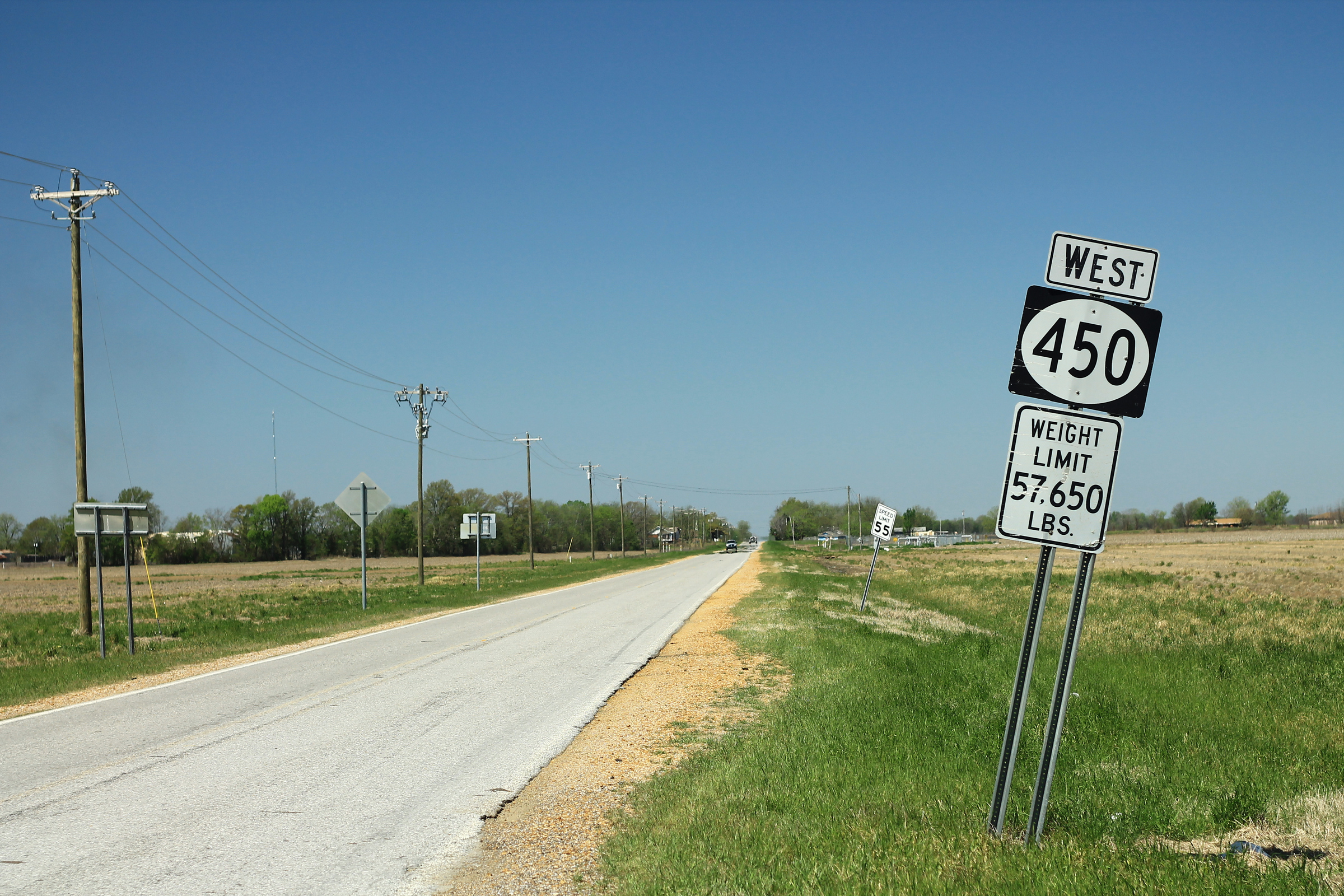
East from western terminus of MS 450, April 2018

MS 450 starts at a T intersection with MS 1 / Great River Road south of Scott, and travels east through farmland. The route soon crosses the Great River Railroad and intersects First Street, a road that leads to Scott. West of Davenport Road, MS 450 begins to shift southward. The road soon meets Stringtown Road at a T intersection. MS 450 becomes concurrent with the road and travels south. About one mile (1.6 km) later, the route turns east, and Stringtown Road continues south. At Dixon Road, the road shifts northward. It travels eastward again at Richard Road, and crosses a small creek east of Dummy Line Road. A few miles later, MS 450 enters the unincorporated community of Choctaw, where it intersects the old routing of US 61. It soon crosses a railroad, and travels to its eastern terminus at US 61 / US 278 (Blues Highway). The road continues east as Boyles Street.

== History ==
MS 450 first appeared on the maps in 1956, as a gravel road connecting from MS 1 to US 61. During the years 1958–1960, the western half of the route was rerouted northward. Soon, MS 450 ran through Stringtown and ended at Scott by 1962. More than half of the road was paved by then. Two years later, the route was fully paved and rerouted back south of Scott, with a new spur route connecting to Stringtown. By 1967, MS 450 connected from Stringtown to south of Scott instead, with the spur route being removed. The path near Stringtown became straightened out by 1974, going in a north–south direction. Also in the same year, US 61 was rerouted east of Choctaw, causing MS 450 to be extended east of the town. By 1999, US 278 became concurrent with US 61 through MS 450's eastern terminus. MS 450 has not changed significantly since 1999.

== Major intersections ==
The entire route is in Bolivar County.

Location	mi	km	Destinations	Notes
	0.000	0.000	MS 1 north / Great River Road north – Benoit, Rosedale MS 1 south / Great River Road south – Greenville	Western terminus; T intersection
Stringtown	5.4	8.7	Stringtown Rd south – MS 448	T intersection; western end of Stringtown Rd concurrency
	6.6	10.6	Stringtown Rd north – Greenville	T intersection; eastern end of Stringtown Rd concurrency
Choctaw	17.1	27.5	Old Hwy 61 north – Shaw; Old Hwy 61 / Zannie Rainey Rd south – Helm	Former routing of US 61
	17.807	28.658	US 61 north / US 278 east (Blues Hwy) – Shaw, Cleveland, Clarksdale US 61 south / US 278 west (Blues Hwy) – Leland	Eastern terminus
	17.807	28.658	Boyles St east	Continuation east from eastern terminus
1.000 mi = 1.609 km; 1.000 km = 0.621 mi: Concurrency terminus

== See also ==
- List of state highways in Mississippi
