= Glen Allan, Mississippi =

Unincorporated community in Mississippi, US

Coordinates: 33°01′36″N 91°01′21″W

Street view of Glen Allan

Glen Allan is a census-designated place (CDP) and unincorporated community located in far southern Washington County, Mississippi. It is situated immediately east of Lake Washington's southern shore.

It has a post office, with the ZIP code 38744.

Per the 2020 Census, the population was 298.

== Demographics ==
Historical population
| Census | Pop. | Note | %± |
|---|---|---|---|
| 2020 | 298 | | — |
U.S. Decennial Census; 2020

Glen Allen was first listed as a census designated place in the 2020 U.S. census.

=== 2020 census ===
Glen Allan CDP, Mississippi – Racial and ethnic composition Note: the US Census treats Hispanic/Latino as an ethnic category. This table excludes Latinos from the racial categories and assigns them to a separate category. Hispanics/Latinos may be of any race.
| Race / Ethnicity (NH = Non-Hispanic) | Pop 2020 | % 2020 |
|---|---|---|
| White alone (NH) | 116 | 38.93% |
| Black or African American alone (NH) | 151 | 50.67% |
| Native American or Alaska Native alone (NH) | 1 | 0.34% |
| Asian alone (NH) | 0 | 0.00% |
| Native Hawaiian or Pacific Islander alone (NH) | 0 | 0.00% |
| Other race alone (NH) | 2 | 0.67% |
| Mixed race or Multiracial (NH) | 8 | 2.68% |
| Hispanic or Latino (any race) | 20 | 6.71% |
| Total | 298 | 100.00% |

== Education ==
Glen Allan is served by the Western Line School District. The elementary schools are O'Bannon Elementary and Riverside Elementary. The High Schools are O'Bannon High and Riverside High School.

== Notable people ==
Glen Allan is the birthplace of author Clifton Taulbert and blues guitarist/singer songwriter Robert Lee "Smokey" Wilson, and Keith Johnson aka Prince of the Delta Blues. He is also the great nephew of blues icon Muddy Waters.
