= Gunnison, Mississippi =

- Town
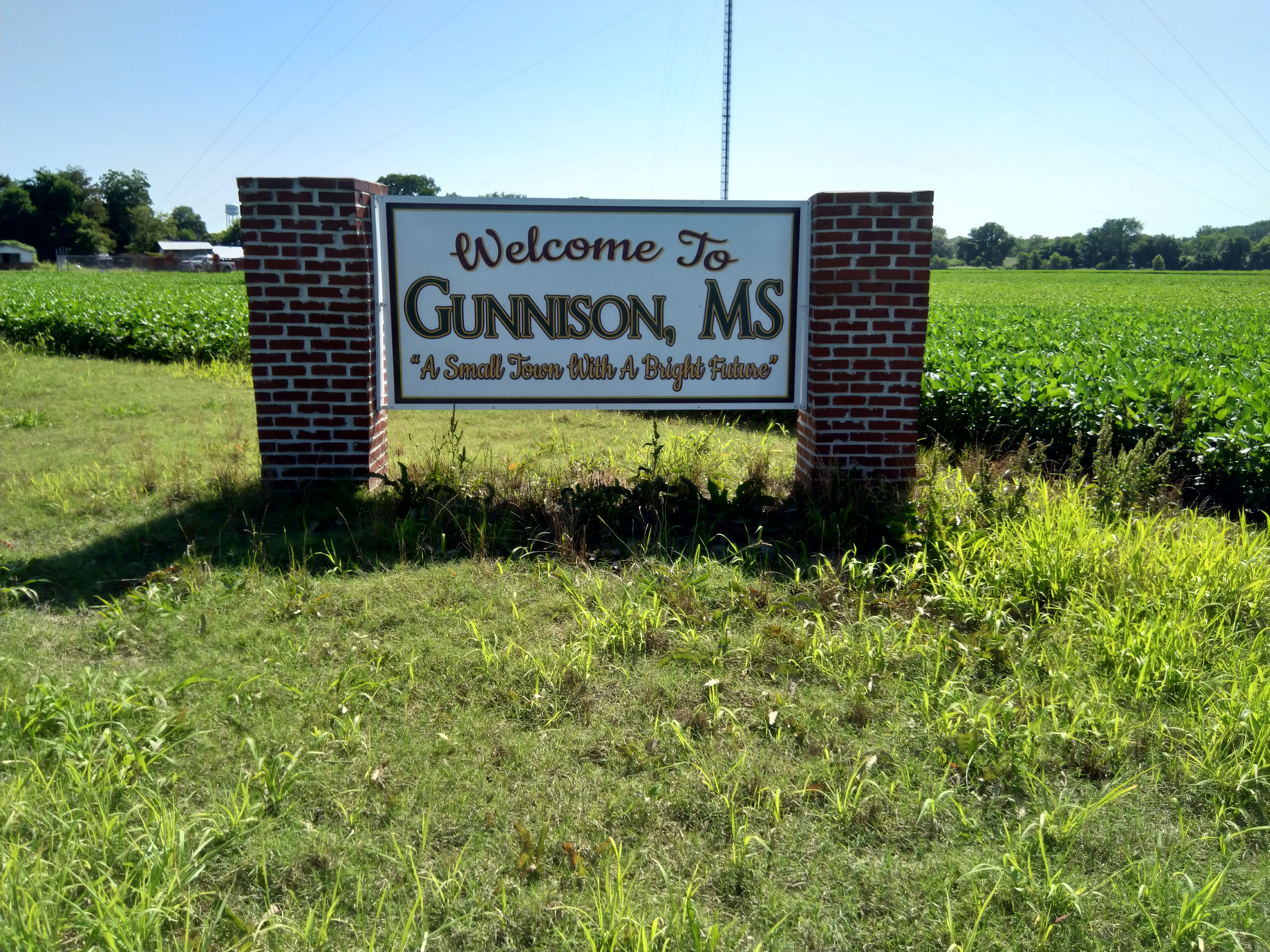
- Welcome sign in Gunnison
- Motto: "A Small Town With A Bright Future"
- Location of Gunnison, Mississippi

- Location in the United States
- Coordinates: 33°56′37″N 90°56′48″W
- Country: United States
- State: Mississippi
- County: Bolivar

Area
  - Total: 1.00 sq mi (2.59 km^{2})
  - Land: 0.98 sq mi (2.54 km^{2})
  - Water: 0.019 sq mi (0.05 km^{2})
- Elevation: 154 ft (47 m)

Population (2020)
  - Total: 295
  - Density: 300.9/sq mi (116.17/km^{2})
- Time zone: UTC-6 (Central (CST))
  - Summer (DST): UTC-5 (CDT)
- ZIP code: 38746
- Area code: 662
- FIPS code: 28-29900
- GNIS feature ID: 2406629

Gunnison is a town in Bolivar County, Mississippi, United States. Per the 2020 census, the population was 295.

== Geography ==
According to the United States Census Bureau, the town has a total area of 1.0 square mile (2.6 km^{2}), of which 0.019 square miles (0.05 km^{2}), or 1.84%, is water.

== Demographics ==
Historical population
Census	Pop.	Note	%±
1900	477		—
1910	515		8.0%
1920	485		−5.8%
1930	484		−0.2%
1940	396		−18.2%
1950	453		14.4%
1960	448		−1.1%
1970	545		21.7%
1980	708		29.9%
1990	611		−13.7%
2000	633		3.6%
2010	452		−28.6%
2020	295		−34.7%
U.S. Decennial Census; 2010 2020

=== Racial and ethnic composition ===
Gunnison town, Mississippi – Racial and ethnic composition Note: the US Census treats Hispanic/Latino as an ethnic category. This table excludes Latinos from the racial categories and assigns them to a separate category. Hispanics/Latinos may be of any race.
Race / Ethnicity (NH = Non-Hispanic)	Pop 2000	Pop 2010	Pop 2020	% 2000	% 2010	% 2020
White alone (NH)	80	46	33	12.64%	10.18%	11.19%
Black or African American alone (NH)	549	397	246	86.73%	87.83%	83.39%
Native American or Alaska Native alone (NH)	1	4	0	0.16%	0.88%	0.00%
Asian alone (NH)	0	0	1	0.00%	0.00%	0.34%
Native Hawaiian or Pacific Islander alone (NH)	0	0	0	0.00%	0.00%	0.00%
Other race alone (NH)	0	0	0	0.00%	0.00%	0.00%
Mixed race or Multiracial (NH)	3	0	4	0.47%	0.00%	1.36%
Hispanic or Latino (any race)	0	5	11	0.00%	1.11%	3.73%
Total	633	452	295	100.00%	100.00%	100.00%

=== 2000 Census ===
As of the census of 2000, there were 633 people, 202 households, and 146 families residing in the town. The population density was 651.1 inhabitants per square mile (251.4/km^{2}). There were 217 housing units at an average density of 223.2 per square mile (86.2/km^{2}). The racial makeup of the town was 12.64% White, 86.73% African American, 0.16% Native American, and 0.47% from two or more races.

There were 202 households, out of which 40.6% had children under the age of 18 living with them, 25.7% were married couples living together, 41.6% had a female householder with no husband present, and 27.7% were non-families. 26.7% of all households were made up of individuals, and 9.4% had someone living alone who was 65 years of age or older. The average household size was 3.13 and the average family size was 3.79.

In the town, the population was spread out, with 37.3% under the age of 18, 11.4% from 18 to 24, 22.1% from 25 to 44, 16.6% from 45 to 64, and 12.6% who were 65 years of age or older. The median age was 26 years. For every 100 females, there were 77.3 males. For every 100 females age 18 and over, there were 66.8 males.

The median income for a household in the town was $19,432, and the median income for a family was $21,875. Males had a median income of $27,679 versus $15,500 for females. The per capita income for the town was $8,395. About 39.3% of families and 47.9% of the population were below the poverty line, including 60.4% of those under age 18 and 34.2% of those age 65 or over.

== Education ==
Gunnison is served by the West Bolivar Consolidated School District (formerly the West Bolivar School District), which operates West Bolivar High School.

== Notable people ==
Cousins Tim Barnett and Fred Barnett both played in the NFL.
