= Sillers =

Sillers is a surname. Notable people with the surname include:

- Tia Sillers, American songwriter
- Walter Sillers, American lawyer
- Walter Sillers Jr. (1888–1966), American lawyer and politician
- Florence Sillers Ogden, American columnist and segregationist
- Florence Warfield Sillers, American historian and socialite

== See also ==
- Siller
