= Christmas, Mississippi =

- Unincorporated community
- Location within Mississippi Location within the United States
- Coordinates: 33°46′35″N 90°58′42″W
- Country: United States
- State: Mississippi
- County: Bolivar
- Elevation: 141 ft (43 m)
- Time zone: UTC-6 (Central (CST))
  - Summer (DST): UTC-5 (CDT)
- Area code: 662
- GNIS feature ID: 691768

Christmas is an unincorporated community in Bolivar County, Mississippi, United States. Christmas is located along Mississippi Highway 1, 0.7 miles (1.1 km) south of Beulah.

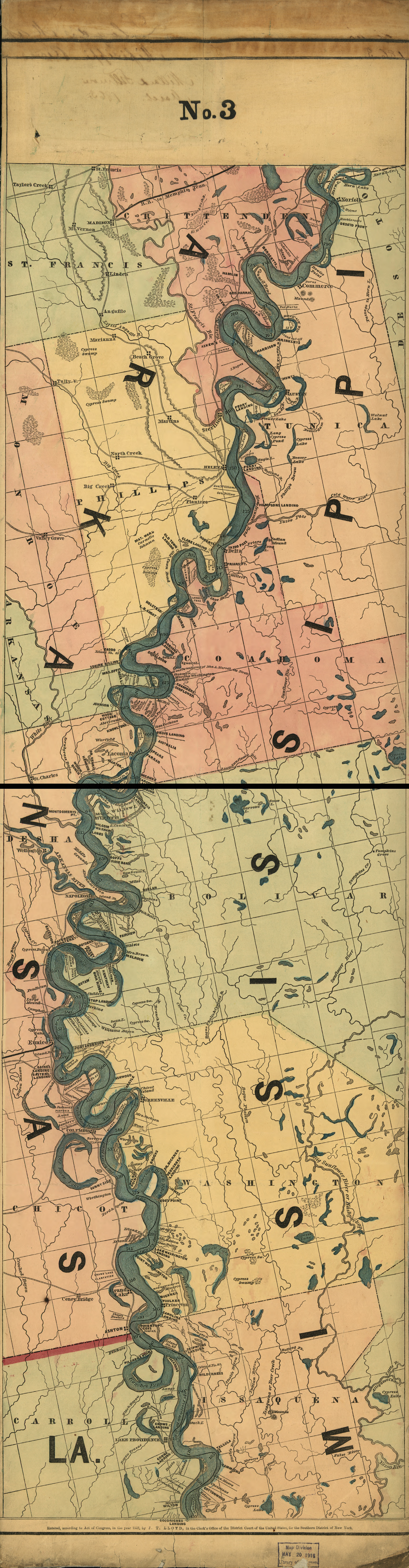
An 1862 map shows Christmas directly on the Mississippi River

Christmas was historically located directly on the Mississippi River, on a section of the river called the "Beulah Bend" (now Lake Beulah). The course of the river was artificially changed in 1863.
