= John L. Pearson (politician) =

American judge and politician (1926–2021)

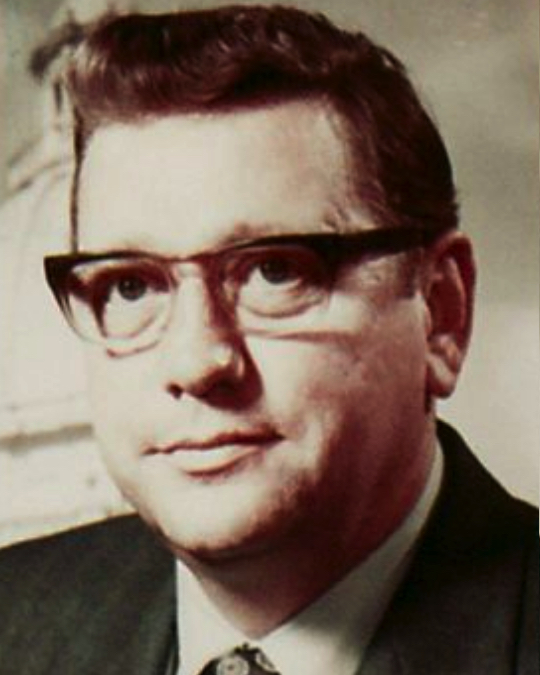

Member of the Mississippi House of Representatives from the 14th district
- In office 1966–1980
- Preceded by: Walter Sillers Jr.
- Succeeded by: John D. Pennebaker

Mayor of Rosedale, Mississippi
- In office 1951–1957
- Preceded by: J. L. Wilson
- Succeeded by: J. L. Wilson Jr.

Personal details
- Born: John Lafayette Pearson III; March 7, 1926 Rosedale, Mississippi, U.S.
- Died: June 30, 2021 (aged 95) Rosedale, Mississippi, U.S.
- Party: Democratic
- Spouse: Katherine Myres (m. 1955)
- Education: University of Mississippi

Military service
- Allegiance: United States
- Branch/service: United States Navy
- Years of service: 1945–1946
- Battles/wars: World War II

John Lafayette Pearson III (March 7, 1926 – June 30, 2021) was an American judge and politician who served in the Mississippi House of Representatives and as mayor of Rosedale, Mississippi. A nephew of Speaker Walter Sillers Jr., Pearson was elected to the House in 1966 when Sillers died in 1966.

== Personal life ==
Pearson married the former Katherine Myres in 1955. They live in the house his grandfather, Walter Sillers, built, which is on the National Register of Historic Places.
