= Wright, Mississippi =

- Unincorporated community
- Location within Mississippi Location within the United States
- Coordinates: 33°53′4.9″N 90°59′55.39″W
- Country: United States
- State: Mississippi
- County: Bolivar
- Elevation: 148 ft (45 m)
- Time zone: UTC-6 (Central (CST))
  - Summer (DST): UTC-5 (CDT)
- ZIP code: 38769
- Area code: 662
- GNIS feature ID: 692312

Wright is an unincorporated community located in Bolivar County, Mississippi, United States. Wright is approximately 3.5 miles (5.6 km) south of Waxhaw and approximately 3 miles (4.8 km) north of Rosedale on Mississippi Highway 1.

Wright is located on the former Illinois Central Gulf Railroad and was once home to two general stores.

A post office operated under the name Wright from 1890 to 1924.
