= Florence Sillers Ogden =

American columnist and segregationist

- Born: Florence Carson Sillers; October 2, 1891; Rosedale, Mississippi, U.S.
- Died: June 23, 1971 (aged 79); Beulah, Mississippi, U.S.
- Resting place: Beulah Cemetery
- Occupations: columnist; conservative activist; society hostess
- Spouse: Harry Cline Ogden
- Parent(s): Walter Sillers; Florence Warfield
- Relatives: Walter Sillers Jr. (brother)

Florence Carson Sillers Ogden (October 2, 1891 – June 23, 1971) was an American newspaper columnist, socialite, conservative political activist, and segregationist. She wrote the column Dis 'n' Dat for the Delta Democrat Times in Greenville and The Clarion-Ledger in Jackson, where she commented on political, social, and economic issues in the United States. A member of a prominent Mississippi family, Ogden was an active member of multiple women's organizations including the Daughters of the American Revolution and the United Daughters of the Confederacy, and was a founding member of Women for Constitutional Government. She used her social influence to organize conservative political movements in Mississippi, promote women's involvement in politics, and defend white supremacy. Ogden was an avid supporter of the White Citizens' Councils, criticized liberal shifts in the National Council of Churches, opposed immigration reform, and publicly denounced the U.S. Supreme Court's ruling in Brown v. Board of Education. A Dixiecrat, she pushed for conservative agendas within the Democratic Party and contributed to the Republican Party's shift to political and cultural dominance in the Deep South.

== Early life and family ==
Ogden was born on October 2, 1891, to Walter Sillers, Sr. and his second wife, Florence Warfield Sillers. She was the sister of Walter Sillers Jr., a white nationalist and politician who served as the Speaker of the Mississippi House of Representatives. A member of an aristocratic Mississippi Delta family, her paternal grandparents were planters and slaveholders operating cotton plantations in Rosedale. Her father's family descended from Scottish colonists from Perthshire, who settled in North Carolina prior to the American Revolutionary War. Her mother was a daughter of Colonel Elisha Warfield, who served in the 2nd Arkansas Infantry Regiment during the American Civil War. On her mother's side, she was a great-great-granddaughter of the physician Elisha Warfield and a great-grandniece of suffragist and abolitionist Mary Jane Warfield Clay. Ogden's father helped engineer the disfranchisement of African Americans in Mississippi in the 1890s and her mother was a prominent socialite who authored a book on the history of Bolivar County that glorified the Antebellum South and the Confederate States of America.

== Career and political activism ==
Ogden earned a reputation as a political columnist in the 1930s, writing her own column titled Dis 'n' Dat. Her writing appeared in the Delta Democrat Times and The Clarion-Ledger. She reported on agricultural issues, economic policies, society events, political happenings, and criticized liberal politicians. Like her mother, Ogden was a leader in her local chapter of the Daughters of the American Revolution, where she networked with other society women and led a movement to celebrate and preserve Mississippi's Confederate history. She also became an active member of the United Daughters of the Confederacy. She was a supporter of the New Deal, implemented by President Franklin D. Roosevelt, for the aid it brought to Mississippi.

In 1948 Ogden spoke at a Dixiecrat gathering of eight hundred women, urging women to become more active in American politics. She reportedly stated, "We, the women, have a big stake in theses issues." In 1952 she publicly expressed her disappointment and frustration with Mississippi's male political leaders who had voted for Adlai Stevenson, a liberal politician, to represent the Democrats as the party's presidential nominee. Ogden then endorsed Dwight D. Eisenhower, the Republican presidential nominee, and formed a chapter of Democrats for Eisenhower in Bolivar County declaring, "now I've got to elect Ike all by myself—with the help of the women."

Although Ogden insisted that her work was inspired by conservative principles and not racial issues, her activism coincided with key moments of the Civil Rights Movement and opposed the overturning of Jim Crow laws. She was an outspoken supporter of racial segregation and defended white supremacy. In 1954 she opposed the U.S. Supreme Court's ruling in Brown v. Board of Education, ending segregation in public schools, calling it "the most outrageous seizure of power in all the history of our country, worthy of Stalin and Russia."

Ogden was a staunch supporter of the White Citizens' Councils, a network of white supremacists. In 1962 she helped found Women for Constitutional Government, an organization born out of the Ole Miss riot of 1962, which occurred when the University of Mississippi decided to integrate. Ogden served as a keynote speaker at the organization's inaugural meeting in Jackson, which was attended by almost two thousand women. In her speech, Ogden called for a return to constitutional and judicial conservatism. The organization would later oppose the United States' participation in the United Nations and campaigned against the Equal Rights Amendment.

Ogden accused churches in the Southern United States of "falling right into the Communist plan" after the National Council of Churches was founded. Odgen felt that Communism and liberalism were synonymous, and saw liberalism as a threat to traditional Protestant Christian values. She openly opposed liberalizing immigration policy, and was part of a grassroots movement to defend the existing government approach to immigration, based on the Immigration Act of 1924, which favored Western European immigrants over immigrants from Asia, Africa, and Latin America. She believed that the existing system protected the American way of life.

== Personal life and death ==
She married Harry Cline Ogden of Chicago on June 29, 1911. They had no children. She died on June 23, 1971, in Beulah, Mississippi.

== Works cited ==
- Benowitz, June Melby (2019). "Mothers of Massive Resistance: White Women and the Politics of White Supremacy by Elizabeth Gillespie McRae (review)". Register of the Kentucky Historical Society. 117 (3–4) (Autumn ed.): 641–643. doi:10.1353/khs.2019.0087. S2CID 239230188.
