= Henry Bufford =

Henry Bufford may refer to:

- John Henry Bufford (1810–1870), American lithographer
- Joseph Henry Bufford (1854–1923), American politician from Mississippi
