= Perry Peyton =

American politician

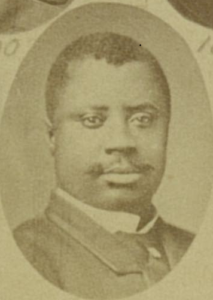

Perry Payton was a state legislator in Mississippi. He represented Bolivar County, Mississippi in the Mississippi House of Representatives in 1884 and 1885. He also served as a justice of the peace.

On January 9, 1884 W. L. Love contested Payton's election victory but he was unsuccessful and Payton was listed as the representative for Bolivar.

He was born c. 1852 in Mississippi.

He was noted along with other "Negro" legislators as being part of a meeting planning involvement in laying a cornerstone for a monument to General Lee.

== See also ==
- African American officeholders from the end of the Civil War until before 1900
