= Choctaw, Mississippi =

Choctaw may refer to either of the following places in the U.S. state of Mississippi:

- Choctaw, Bolivar County, Mississippi
- Choctaw, Neshoba County, Mississippi
