= Waxhaw =

Waxhaw may refer to:

- Waxhaw people, a historic tribe native to South Carolina and North Carolina
  - Waxhaws, a geographical area on the border of South Carolina and North Carolina
- Waxhaw, North Carolina, United States
- Waxhaw, Mississippi, United States, formerly also known as Waxhaw Plantation

== See also ==
- Battle of Waxhaws, 1780
