= Riverton, Mississippi =

- Ghost town
- Location within the state of Mississippi Riverton, Mississippi (the United States)
- Coordinates: 33°49′11″N 91°01′15″W
- Country: United States
- State: Mississippi
- County: Bolivar
- Elevation: 131 ft (40 m)
- Time zone: UTC-6 (Central (CST))
  - Summer (DST): UTC-5 (CDT)
- GNIS feature ID: 692179

Riverton (also Riverton Landing) is a ghost town in Bolivar County, Mississippi, United States.

Riverton was located directly on the Mississippi River, and flourished during the 1870s and 1880s. The location is today occupied by a shipping port and industrial park. North of the former settlement is Great River Road State Park.

== History ==
Riverton was located along a bend in the Mississippi River called "Rosedale Bend", and nearby Rosedale was located at the top of the bend.

The location was originally known as "Wood Yard" and "Old Pride's Point", and was a place where steamboats would stop during the 1840s to load fuel-wood harvested from the dense forests near the river.

Riverton was one of many Mississippi settlements established on the Mississippi River opposite the mouths of the White River and Arkansas River in Arkansas.

B. J. Martin built the first railroad in Bolivar County from Riverton to Bogue Phalia, approximately 8 mi (13 km) east. The railcars were pulled by mules.

Charles T. Christmas, a former slave from Riverton, patented a bailing press in 1880 which made cotton bales more compact, and therefore cut shipping costs.

In 1884, D. Reinach built one of the largest stores in the Bolivar County at Riverton, and served as postmaster of the Riverton post office.

A post office operated under the name Riverton from 1873 to 1896.

== Decline ==
Large sandbars formed along the east bank of Rosedale Bend, leaving both Rosedale and Riverton without access to the river. Riverton "gave up the battle in the 1880s and quietly disappeared".

== Port of Rosedale ==
During the late 1970s, the United States Army Corps of Engineers constructed a 2.7 mi (4.3 km)-long channel running southwest from the Riverton location to the Mississippi River. The Port of Rosedale was erected on the site of the former settlement, featuring a port facility and 270-acre (110 ha) industrial park. In 2011, the Port of Rosedale processed 1.5 million tons of cargo.
