= Walter Sillers =

American lawyer (1852–1931)

Walter Sillers Sr.

Member of the Mississippi House of Representatives from the Bolivar County district
- In office 1886–1890

Chairman of the Mississippi Levee Board of Commissioners
- In office 1924–1931

Personal details
- Born: March 2, 1852 Jefferson County, Mississippi; United States
- Died: January 3, 1931 (aged 78)
- Party: Democratic
- Spouse(s): Ida Gayden; Florence Warfield
- Children: 8 (including Walter and Florence)
- Parent(s): Joseph Sillers; Matilda Clark
- Education: University of Mississippi

Walter Sillers Sr. (March 2, 1852 – January 3, 1931) was an American lawyer, politician, businessman, and planter in Mississippi. He played a significant role in the economic, agricultural, and political culture of the Mississippi Delta region. A cotton planter, he was an advocate for the establishment of crop control policies for the Southern United States through the development of planter's cooperatives. He was a key figure in the Mississippi Democratic Party and was responsible for the construction of levees in the Mississippi River Valley.

== Early life ==
Sillers was born on March 2, 1852, in Jefferson County, Mississippi. He was the son of Joseph Sillers, a planter and Confederate soldier who was captured by Union forces during the Siege of Vicksburg, and Matilda Clark, sister of Mississippi Governor Charles Clark. Sillers was descended from Scottish colonists. He grew up on one of his family's plantations in Bolivar County, where he moved in 1854. He attended the University of Mississippi.

== Career ==
Sillers took part in the 1875 political revolution in Mississippi, overthrowing Reconstruction Republican governance and restoring the Democratic Party to power in the Mississippi Delta, by organizing the first Democratic Club of Bolivar. He served as a member of the Mississippi Democratic Executive Committee. Sillers held public office for one term, as a state representative for Bolivar County in 1886.

Sillers ran multiple cotton plantations, labored by African-American tenant workers after Emancipation, that he had inherited from his family. He owned a law office and Rosedale's bank. He practiced law in Bolivar County for sixty years. As a cotton planter, he played a prominent role in the economic and agricultural culture of the Delta region. He advocated for crop control policies via the development of planter's cooperatives throughout the Southern United States. He was a charter member of the Staple Cotton Cooperative Association of Greenwood, one of the first co-ops to be established in the region.

Sillers was a member of the Levee Board and served as the board's attorney from 1895 to 1904. He began his interest in the development of levees on his family's plantation at Lake Beulah, where he worked as a levee guard during the flood seasons. He was officially appointed to the board by Governor Earl Brewer in 1915. He was elected president of the Board of Levee Commissioners in 1924 and held that position until his death in 1931. In this capacity, he played a leading role in designing, building, and policing the levees. He advocated for Congressional approval for the separation of flood control from the provisions of the Rivers and Harbors Act. Sillers also advocated for changes in flood control projects before the U.S. Army Corps of Engineers. He was responsible for the creation of the Ashbrook impoundment area near Greenville, the reopening of the Brunswick Gap as an outlet for the Yazoo River, Coldwater River and Sunflower River, and advocated for the construction of the Eudora Spillway through Cypress Creek, Atchafalaya River, and Red River.

== Personal life ==
Sillers married Ida Gayden and had two children, Maude Evelyn Sillers and Walter Sillers. In 1884 he moved to Rosedale from Beulah after the death of his first wife and infant son, Walter, shortly after the boy was born. He remarried seventeen-year-old Florence Carson Warfield in April 1887. They had had six children; Anna Farrar Sillers, Mary Sillers Skinner, Florence Sillers Ogden, Walter Sillers Jr., Evelyn Sillers Pearson, and Lillian Burrill Sillers Holleman. Sillers built a large mansion on Levee Street in Rosedale in 1889.
