= Lake Beulah =

Lake Beulah may refer to:

- Lake Beulah (Florida), a lake in Florida
- Lake Beulah (Mississippi), a lake in Mississippi
- Lake Beulah, Wisconsin, an unincorporated community
