= Florence Warfield Sillers =

American socialite and historian

- Born: Florence Carson Warfield; September 25, 1869; Boonville, Missouri; United States
- Died: April 5, 1958 (aged 88)
- Resting place: Beulah Cemetery; Beulah, Mississippi
- Occupations: historian; socialite
- Spouse: Walter Sillers
- Children: 6 (including Walter and Florence)
- Parent(s): Elisha Warfield; Mary Anderson Carson
- Writing career
- Notable works: History of Bolivar County, Mississippi

Florence Carson Warfield Sillers (September 25, 1869 – April 5, 1958) was an American socialite and historian. A member of an influential American family with colonial ties, Sillers was a prominent figure of Mississippi society and was a founding member of the Mississippi Delta Chapter of the Daughters of the American Revolution. She was a member of multiple lineage and historical societies including the Colonial Dames of America, the National Society Magna Charta Dames and Barons, and the Mississippi Historical Society. In 1948 she published the History of Bolivar County, Mississippi, a book on the history of Bolivar County that glorified the Confederacy and contributed to the Lost Cause narrative.

== Biography ==
Sillers was born on September 25, 1869, in Booneville, Missouri, and grew up in Louisiana and Mississippi. She was the daughter of Colonel Elisha Warfield and Mary Anderson Carson. Her father, a planter who owned a plantation in Bolivar County, Mississippi, near Rosedale, served as a Confederate Officer in the 2nd Arkansas Infantry Regiment during the American Civil War. Her paternal ancestors had come from Great Britain to the Province of Maryland in the 17th century. Sillers was the great-granddaughter of the physician and horse-breeder Elisha Warfield and a grandniece of the suffragist Mary Jane Warfield Clay.

In 1887, at the age of seventeen, she married Walter Sillers, a lawyer and member of a prominent Mississippi Delta family, and had six children; Anna Farrar Sillers, Mary Sillers Skinner, Florence Sillers Ogden, Walter Sillers Jr., Evelyn Sillers Pearson, and Lillian Burrill Sillers Holleman. She was his second wife. Her husband owned several plantations in Bolivar County and was a Mississippi Democratic executive committee member. She lived with her family in a Victorian style mansion on Levee Street in Rosedale.

As a prominent society figure in Mississippi, Sillers was member of multiple social societies and civic organizations including local chapters of the Colonial Dames of America, American Farm Bureau Federation, American Red Cross, Mississippi Delta Council, and the Rosedale Country Club. She was a member of the Methodist Episcopal Church and served as treasurer of the King's Daughters Hospital of Rosedale for twenty years. She was also a member of the Texas State Historical Association and the Mississippi Historical Society. Sillers was a founding member of the Mississippi Delta Chapter of the Daughters of the American Revolution. She later served as regent of the Chapter. In 1948 Sillers authored a book on the history of Bolivar County, titled History of Bolivar County, Mississippi, that glorified the Antebellum South and the Confederate States of America. Sillers was also a member of the National Society Magna Charta Dames and Barons, a society for descendants of signers of Magna Carta.

Sillers died on April 5, 1958, and is buried at Beulah Cemetery in Beulah, Mississippi.
