= Napoleon, Arkansas =

Former populated place in Desha County, Arkansas

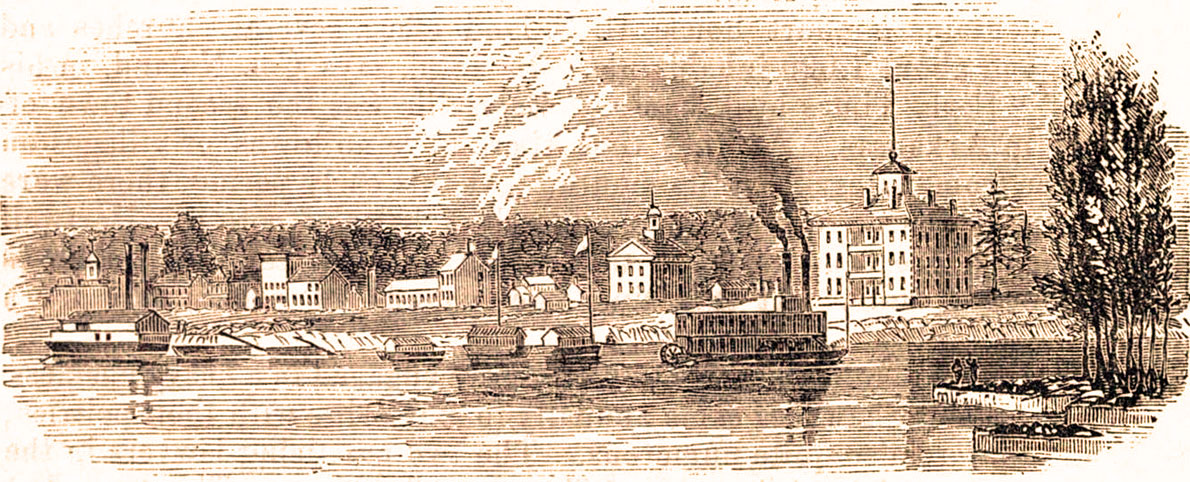
- Napoleon from the northern bank of the Arkansas River

- Location within Arkansas
- 33°47′44″N 91°06′26″W
- Location: Desha County, Arkansas

History
- Founder: Frederick Notrebe

Napoleon was a river port and the county seat of Desha County, Arkansas, from 1838 to 1874. It was located at the confluence of the Arkansas and the Mississippi rivers. Napoleon was badly damaged during the Civil War and then finally abandoned after most of it had washed into the Mississippi River.

== History ==
=== Founding ===
Napoleon was founded at the confluence of the Arkansas and Mississippi River, on the West bank of the Arkansas's mouth, by Frederick Notrebe who named the town in honor of "his old commander". The area was one of the most common thoroughfares that existed along the Mississippi but was sure to meet hardship due to the unwieldy Arkansas and Mississippi which would commonly flood and change course. The exact date of Napoleon's founding is not certain. A Post office was established in 1832. A primary school was founded on December 10, 1838. Bishop Joseph Rosati of St. Louis sent Father Peter Donnelly to establish a Catholic church in Arkansas, where he purchased land and held the first mass there in May 1839.

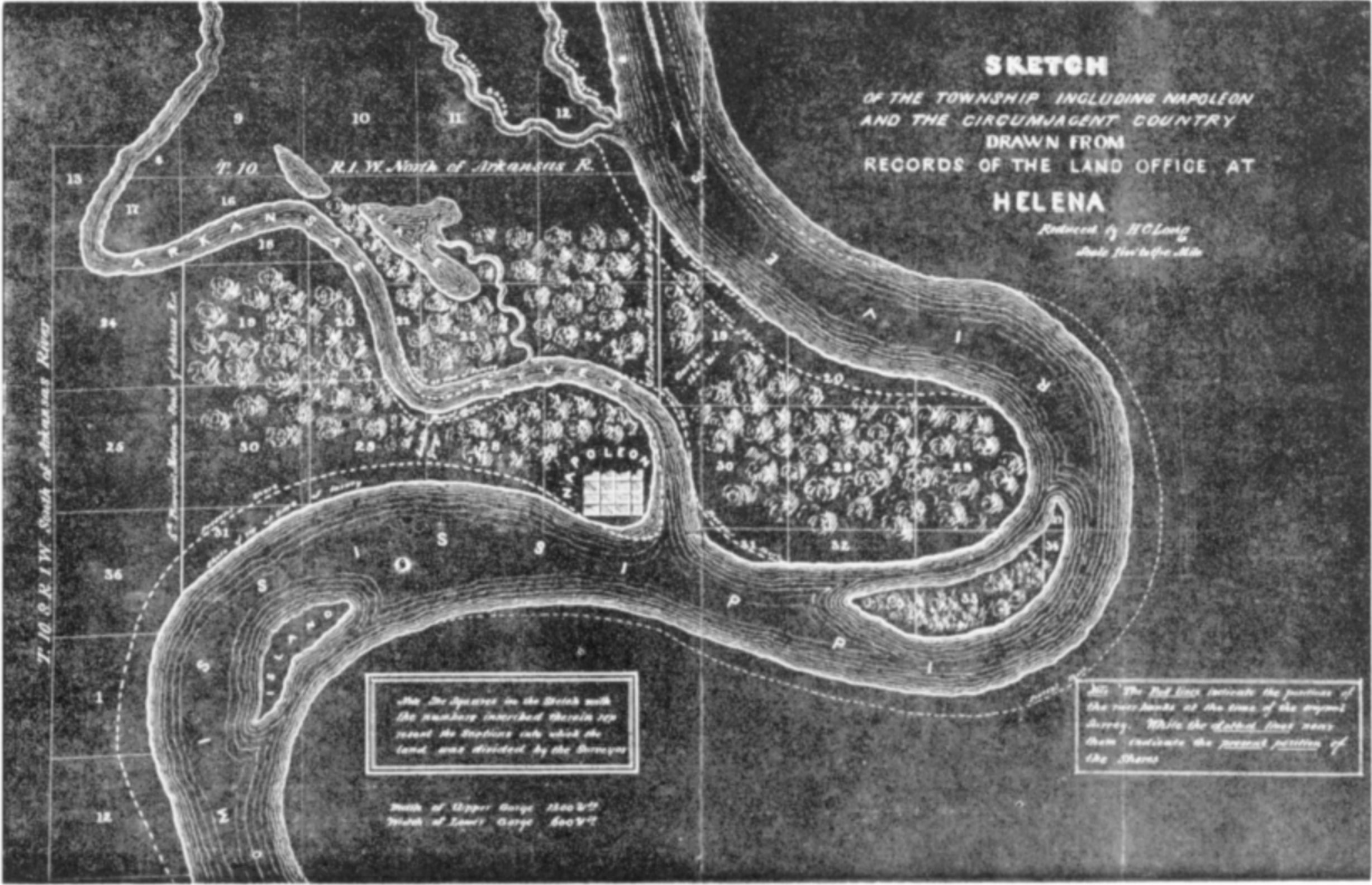
Sketch of the Township Including Napoleon and the Circumjacent County by Major Stephen Long, c. 1849

The leaders of Napoleon were ambitious, not only did they create a town with a large wharf, they lobbied to be the location of one of the Federal Marine Hospitals and aspired to build a railroad linking Napoleon to the Pacific Ocean. Despite such aspiration the town quick established a sour reputation for filth, bugs and crime. U.S. Supreme Court Justice Peter Vivian Daniel wrote to his daughter about his visit to Napoleon in 1851 calling it a "miserable place [that] consists of a few slightly build wood houses, hastily erected no doubt under some scheme of speculations, and which are tumbling down without ever having been finished…"

In 1852, Bolivar County established Wellington, Mississippi, as its county seat, nearly opposite Napoleon, on the east bank of the Mississippi River. There would have been a natural rivalry between business and civic leaders in Desha County, Arkansas, and Bolivar County for river-related commerce at the confluence of the Arkansas and Mississippi rivers. From 1850 to 1860 the town had nearly doubled in population. Other nearby townships were recorded as using Napoleon's post office and the Marine Hospital had become the primary fixture of the town. While the population grew, floods levees were highly discussed but rarely constructed. Such levees were common work at other towns such as New Orleans and Baton Rouge but above the river at Napoleon an army report mentioned, "few or none had yet been attempted." Still the promise of levees had at least secured the building of the Marine Hospital.

=== Marine Hospital ===
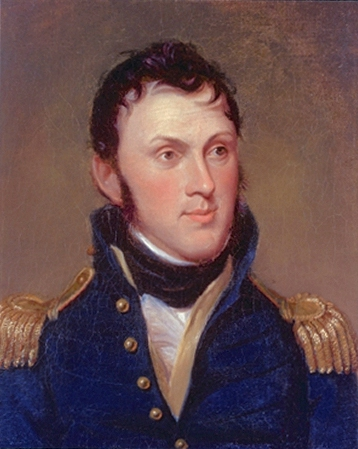
Major Stephen Long

In 1837 Congress authorized the building of seven Marine Hospitals. Napoleon was one of the locations chosen by Congress on August 29, 1842. Major Stephen Long of the U.S. Topographical Engineers was instructed to build the first hospital at Louisville, Kentucky. Long was commissioned to build the Marine Hospital at Napoleon in 1849. Long noticed the flooding problems right away in Napoleon writing, "I cannot but regard the site selected for this hospital objectionable." He had petitioned for the high bluffs at Helena, Arkansas to be the location for the hospital for that area. His objections to the location were ignored. Senator Solon Borland wrote to the Corps of Topographical Engineers that the situation at Napoleon had been discussed before the bill was passed that would create the Marine Hospital at Napoleon. The hospital at Napoleon ordered to begin without delay.

In the Spring of 1850 Long requested $10,250 in order to begin construction but it wasn't until August that construction finally started thanks to flooding which had hampered the work on the foundation and cellar. Delays continued to dog the construction and by the Spring of 1851 the supervisor wrote Long suggesting suspension of the work as contracts were expiring due to delays and sickness had been rampant. Work resumed in October 1851 and the slow pace continued over the next three years. By August 1854 the hospital was finally finished but the hospital did not accept its first patients until 1855.

Long's observations and objections had been accurate. By March 11, 1868, the river had eroded the land to 52 feet from the hospital's doors. Less than a month later, and nearly four years after Long's death, a corner of the hospital fell into the River. The Weekly Arkansas Gazette of May 19, 1868, wrote: "We learn from Mr. Boyd, who has just returned from Napoleon, that the U. S. Marine Hospital at that place has about one half broken off and caved into the river." As the hospital gradually fell into the water, its custodian tried to sell what he could rescue from it.

The entire town of Napoleon would be swallowed by the river only twenty-five years after Long first objected to building the hospital at Napoleon.

=== American Civil War ===
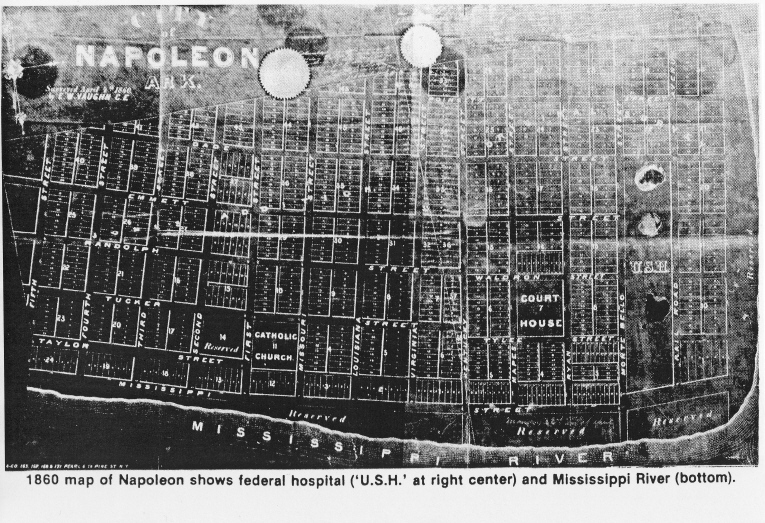
1860 map of Napoleon, Arkansas

On February 12, 1861, before Arkansas seceded from the Union in May, Gov. Henry Rector ordered the seizure of the Marine Hospital and ammunition shipments. In April 1861 secessionists set up two cannons at Napoleon with the intention of forcing riverboats to stop for inspection.

By September 1862 the Union army occupied Napoleon and the Union Navy controlled the rivers. While the city was under Federal control, the once bustling port had all but been deserted. The economy was in ruins, slavery was coming to a sudden end, and river traffic was entirely Union controlled. During the winter of 1863 the town had been largely pillaged for firewood. The Catholic church had its pews ripped apart and the only structure still standing was the Marine Hospital, which Federal forces did not use the for its intended purpose, instead sending patients elsewhere. While the hospital would survive the war it wouldn't survive the river.

Even after the Confederates were routed at the Battle of Saint Charles in June 1862 and the Battle of Fort Hindman in January 1863 (at Arkansas Post where the Union advance landed at the Notrebe plantation), the Union forces could not stop rebels from harassing union ships. Following one such ambush in 1863, a Federal gunship led by William Tecumseh Sherman landed at Wellington and burned it.

== Geography ==
The river that allowed the prosperity of Napoleon, Arkansas began its demise on April 14, 1863. Union Commander Thomas Oliver Selfridge who lead the USS Conestonga on patrols around the area of Napoleon had grown furious as to the inability to stop the rebels from firing at Union ships using the Beulah Bend. Selfridge's boss David Porter, called the bend, "one of the worst points for guerrillas."

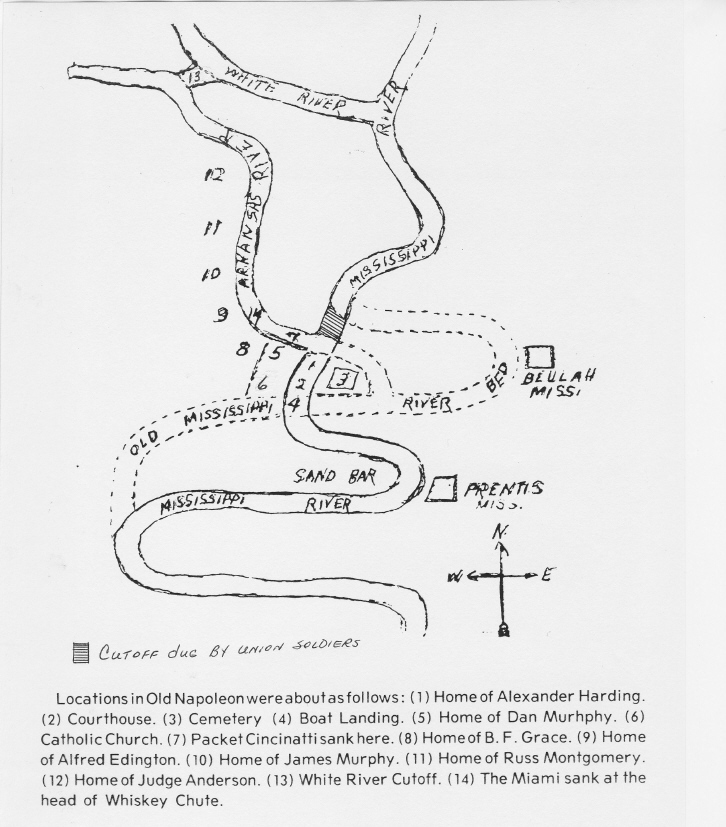
Antebellum sketch of Napoleon

East of Napoleon, the Beulah Bend (now Lake Beulah) was a 10-mile arc of the Mississippi River that started at the mouth of the Arkansas and semi-circled back around to within a mile of the Arkansas river's mouth. During the American Civil War, Confederate soldiers would move east by foot from Napoleon, hide in a wooded area near the bend, and then fire on passing Union ships. The bend was so tight that Rebels could fire at a ships headed down stream the Mississippi and leisurely move cannons a few hundred yards to wait and fire at the same ships.

Selfridge sought to dig a canal that would reroute the river from the Beulah bend. He obtained the idea when he noticed the floodwaters near Beulah Bend made the distance feasible. The tactic (Grant's Canal) had failed miserably at the Siege of Vicksburg but Selfridge put his men to work on digging a canal only a few hundred yards long. It didn't take long. In just a single day the water had made a raging torrent cut into the earth and carried even large trees. The next morning Selfridge couldn't wait. He opened up the new canal at full speed in the Conestonga, estimating the current to be at 12 knots and surprised transport ship that had seen them behind them the day prior.

Admiral Porter was impressed. He wrote to the secretary of the Navy, Gideon Welles, on April 16, 1863, saying, "I have the honor to enclose a letter from Lieutenant-Commander Thomas O. Selfridge, which is interesting from the fact that it shows how easily cut-offs are made in the Mississippi when conducted with ordinary intelligence. I send a diagram which will explain the operation. We have been threatened for some time past with an attack from the Arkansas rebels in steamers. Every provision was made to meet it. Lieutenant-Commander Selfridge saw the difficulty in defending the mouths of White and Arkansas rivers while kept so far apart by a useless neck of land and proposed to me to cut it. I ordered him to do so, and he passed through with his vessel twenty- four hours after he cut the bend, this saving a distance of over 10 miles. The mouths of Arkansas and White River are now brought close together, and a small force can defend both. One of the worst points for guerrillas is also cut off, as these pests of the human race could, from the isthmus, attack a vessel on one side and be ready to meet her on the other as she came around; the distance being 10 miles around and half a mile across."

== Abandonment and destruction ==
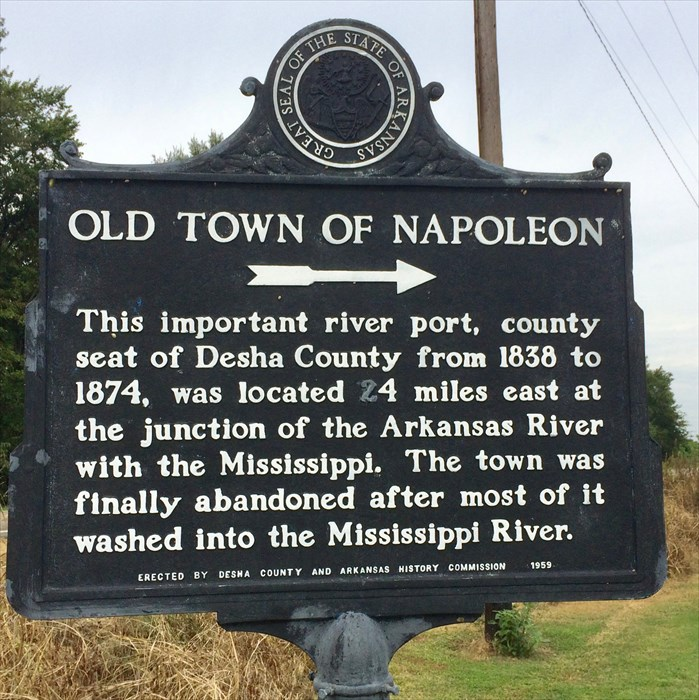
State historical marker

Though the cut had improved river traffic, the cut hastened the end of Napoleon. The Mississippi's water was soon eroding the banks of the town. Ten years after the canal was dug the town would be gone. Napoleon after the war was practically a ghost town.

Although several families returned, most did not. In 1870, the Napoleon News claimed that silver had been discovered near Napoleon and predicted that this would raise the town to new heights. Many were hopeful for the town to return to prosperity, but Napoleon would not become the host of a silver boom nor much else. Floods continued.

The Catholic church bell is now at McGehee.

All that is left of Napoleon are a few ruins which are only visible when the water is low.

== In popular culture ==
The town was the subject of a chapter in Mark Twain's Life on the Mississippi, in which he tells a made up story of learning from a deathbed confession that $10,000 was hidden behind a brick in a building in Napoleon. When Twain tried to retrieve it, he discovered the entire town had been washed away. Twain reports that the early explorers De Soto, Marquette and Joliet, and La Salle visited "the site of the future town of Napoleon, Arkansas" in their pioneering journeys.

== See also ==
- List of flooded towns in the United States
- List of ghost towns in Arkansas
