= Hushpuckena, Mississippi =

- Unincorporated community
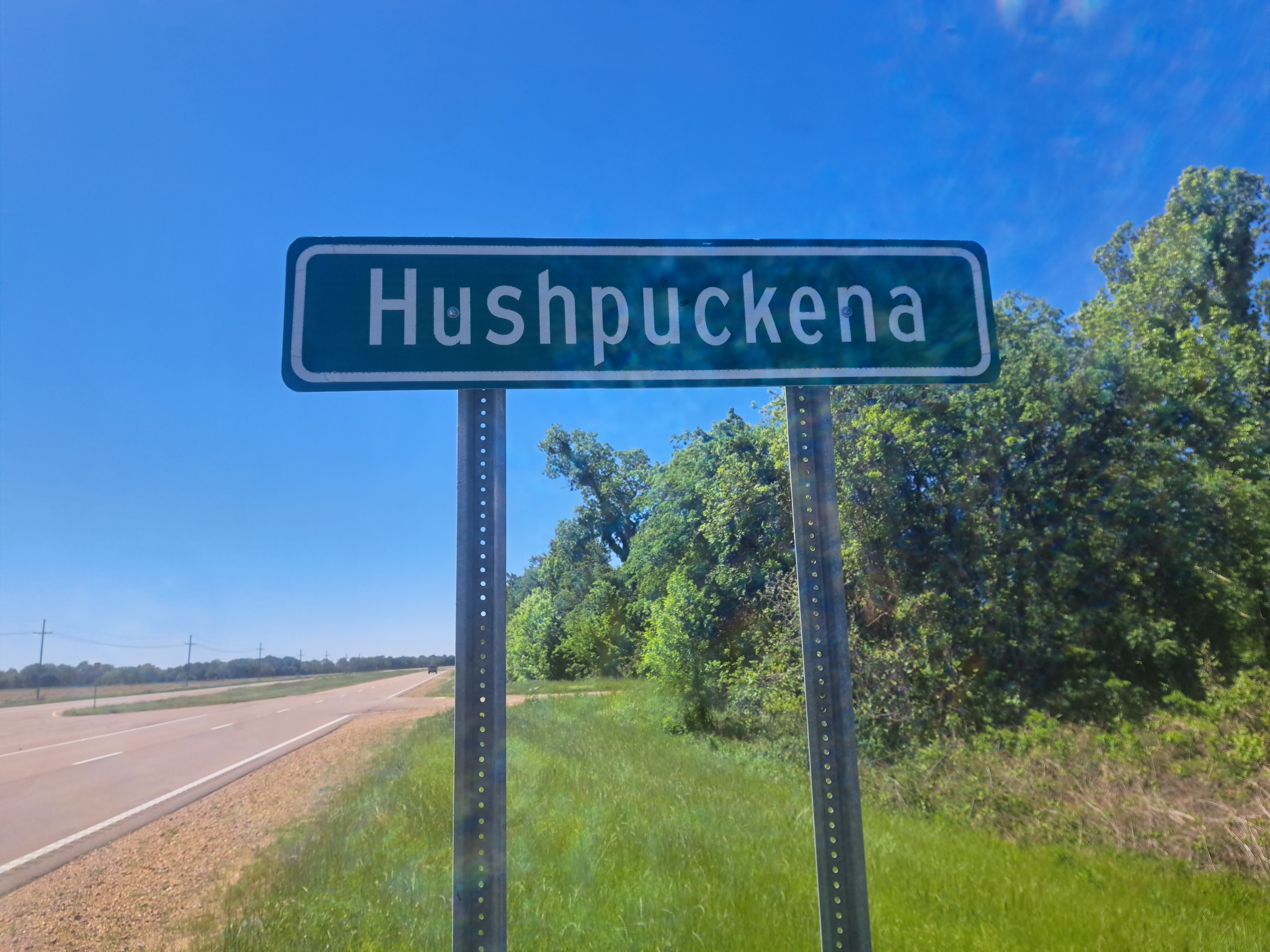
- Highway sign outside of Hushpuckena

- Location within Mississippi Location within the United States
- Coordinates: 34°00′17″N 90°45′11″W
- Country: United States
- State: Mississippi
- County: Bolivar
- Elevation: 128 ft (39 m)
- Time zone: UTC-6 (Central (CST))
  - Summer (DST): UTC-5 (CDT)
- ZIP code: 38774
- Area code: 662
- GNIS feature ID: 671639

Hushpuckena is an unincorporated community located in Bolivar County, Mississippi, United States along U.S. Route 61. Hushpuckena is located approximately 3 miles (4.8 km) south of Duncan and approximately 4 miles (6.4 km) north of Shelby. Hushpuckena is located on the former Yazoo and Mississippi Valley Railroad. Hushpuckena was named after the Hushpuckena River. Hushpuckena is a name derived from the Choctaw language purported to mean "sunflowers are abundant".

A post office operated under the name Hushpuckena from 1885 to 1968.

== In popular culture ==
Hushpuckena was mentioned in Tom Waits' 1999 song "Pony," as well as Irish singer-songwriter Hozier's 2023 song “Butchered Tongue”.

== Gallery ==
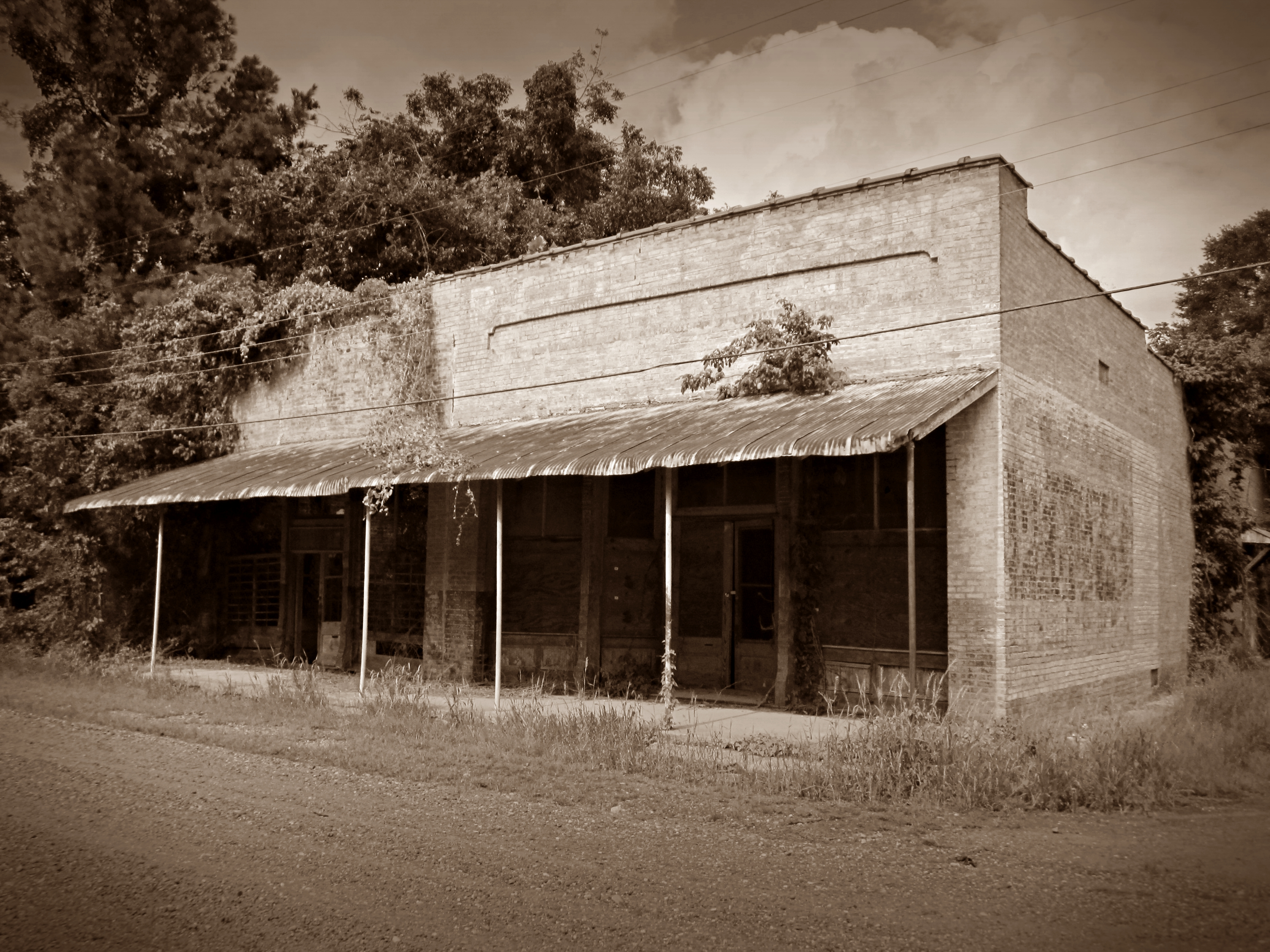
Abandoned storefronts in Hushpuckena
