= Stringtown, Mississippi =

- Unincorporated community
- Location within Mississippi Location within the United States
- Coordinates: 33°34′29″N 90°59′04″W
- Country: United States
- State: Mississippi
- County: Bolivar
- Elevation: 131 ft (40 m)
- Time zone: UTC-6 (Central (CST))
  - Summer (DST): UTC-5 (CDT)
- ZIP code: 38725
- Area code: 662
- GNIS feature ID: 678364

Stringtown is an unincorporated community located in Bolivar County, Mississippi, United States. Stringtown is approximately 6 miles (9.7 km) south/southeast of Benoit and approximately 9 miles (14 km) east of Choctaw.

A post office operated under the name Stringtown from 1906 to 1965 and under the name Stringtown Rural Station from 1965 to 1974.

== Notable people ==
- L.V. Banks, Chicago blues guitarist and singer
- Eddie Shaw, Chicago blues tenor saxophonist
