= Dahomy, Mississippi =

- Unincorporated community
- Location within Mississippi Location within the United States
- Coordinates: 33°40′28″N 90°59′06″W
- Country: United States
- State: Mississippi
- County: Bolivar
- Elevation: 141 ft (43 m)
- Time zone: UTC-6 (Central (CST))
  - Summer (DST): UTC-5 (CDT)
- GNIS feature ID: 711172

Dahomy is an unincorporated community in Bolivar County, Mississippi, United States.

== History ==
The Dahomey Plantation was founded in 1833 by F.G. Ellis, who named it after Dahomey, the homeland of his slaves. The plantation became the largest cotton plantation in the world.

The settlement of Dahomy was likely established when the Louisville, New Orleans and Texas Railway was completed through the plantation in the 1880s.

A post office was established prior to 1907 and closed in 1937.

In 1991, 9,691 acres (3,922 ha) of the original Dahomey Plantation was used to established the Dahomey National Wildlife Refuge, located 2.5 mi (4.0 km) east of the settlement of Dahomy.
