= Walter Sillers Jr. =

American politician (1888–1966)

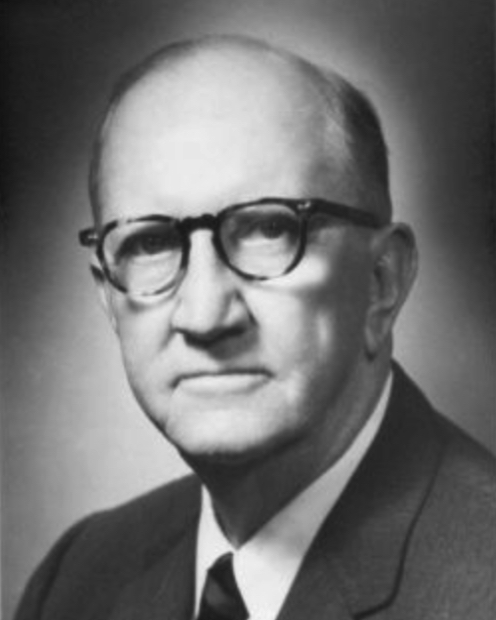

56th Speaker of the Mississippi House of Representatives
- In office January 4, 1944 – September 24, 1966
- Preceded by: Sam Lumpkin
- Succeeded by: John Junkin

Member of the Mississippi House of Representatives from Bolivar County
- In office January 4, 1916 – September 24, 1966
- Preceded by: George Shelby
- Succeeded by: John L. Pearson

Personal details
- Born: April 13, 1888 Rosedale, Mississippi, U.S.
- Died: September 24, 1966 (aged 78) Jackson, Mississippi, U.S.
- Party: Democratic
- Spouse: Lena Roberts (m. 1911)
- Parents: Walter Sillers; Florence Warfield Sillers
- Education: University of Mississippi

Walter Sillers Jr. (April 13, 1888 – September 24, 1966) was an American lawyer, politician, landowner, and white supremacist. A legislative leader from Mississippi, he served as the 56th Speaker of the Mississippi House of Representatives. An outspoken white nationalist, Sillers has been referred to as one of the most racist political leaders in Mississippi's history. He was one of the wealthiest people to have ever served in the Mississippi legislature. He served on the Mississippi Sovereignty Commission, a state agency established to combat integration and civil rights organizing.

== Background ==
Sillers was born in Rosedale, Mississippi to Walter Sillers Sr. and Florence Warfield Sillers. He was a brother of the columnist and segregationist Florence Sillers Ogden. A member of a prominent Mississippi Delta family, his paternal grandparents were planters and slaveholders in Rosedale. His maternal grandfather was Colonel Elisha Warfield, a planter and Confederate military officer who served in the 2nd Arkansas Infantry Regiment. He was a great-great-grandson of Elisha Warfield and a great-grandnephew of Mary Jane Warfield Clay. He was a grandnephew of Charles Clark, a Confederate general who served as Governor of Mississippi.

Sillers grew up in Rosedale and was raised in the Methodist Episcopal Church. He lived with his family in a large Victorian-style mansion on Levee Street. He was educated at St. Andrew's-Sewanee School, an Episcopal boarding school in Sewanee, Tennessee. He attended the University of Mississippi and was a member of St. Anthony Hall.

== Career ==
Sillers was a lawyer and a member of the American Bar Association. He served in the Mississippi House of Representatives from 1916 to 1966. He served as Speaker of that body from January 4, 1944, until his death on September 24, 1966. He was a delegate to the Democratic National Conventions of 1916, 1924, 1944, 1948, 1952, and 1956.

He has been called "one of the most racist political leaders in Mississippi's history."

He inherited multiple plantations from his father and held interests in banks, oil companies, and other businesses in Mississippi. Due to his inheritance and business ventures, he was one of the wealthiest people to have ever served in the Mississippi legislature.

== Naming and controversy ==
Given Sillers' preeminence in the state legislature, several public buildings were named for him during his fifty years in office. The fine arts complex was named after him at the historically black Mississippi Valley State University. The Walter Sillers State Office Building, a government high-rise in Jackson, Mississippi is also named after him.

Delta State University's Walter Sillers Coliseum, built in 1960 with proceeds from a sale of bonds which Sillers opposed, has also come under scrutiny, with public calls for the building to be named after Lusia Harris instead, an African American woman who led the Delta State Lady Statesmen basketball team to three consecutive national championships and became the first and only woman ever drafted into the NBA.

Sillers himself, an outspoken white supremacist, advocated for the removal of the names of white namesakes from public spaces should they become integrated.

== Personal ==
On November 22, 1911, he married Lena Roberts, the daughter of longtime state senator W. B. Roberts. He was a member of the Freemasons and the Shriners. Sillers died at the age of 78 on September 24, 1966. He was buried at Beulah Cemetery in Beulah, Mississippi.
