= Siller =

Siller is a surname. Notable people with the surname include:

- Esteban Siller (1931–2013), Mexican voice actor
- Eugenio Siller (born 1981), Mexican actor, singer, and model
- Jerónimo Siller (1880–1962), Mexican inventor, politician and military man
- Morag Siller (1969–2016), Scottish actress, voice artist, and radio personality
- Raymond Siller (born 1939), American television writer and political consultant
- Sebastian Siller (born 1989), Austrian footballer

== See also ==
- Sillers
