= The Bolivar Commercial =

The Bolivar Commercial was a newspaper printed in Cleveland, Mississippi, United States, from 1916 to 2020. It was owned by Walls Newspapers and served the area of the Bolivar County in the Mississippi Delta. Its closure in 2020 was attributed to a loss of ad revenue from the Great Recession, the COVID-19 pandemic in Mississippi, and the rise of alternative news sources.

== History ==
The Bolivar Commercial began publishing in 1916. In 1972, the paper converted from a weekly to a daily under the leadership of editor Norman Van Liew. The newspaper was bought by the Walls family in the 1980s. In 2001, the paper was observed to have a daily circulation of 7,200, nearly tripling the circulation about 30 years prior. In 2002, editorial writer Wayne Nicholas was awarded the J. Oliver Emmerich Award for Editorial Excellence from the Mississippi Press Association. One year later, Van Liew was inducted into the association's hall of fame.

=== Closure ===
The newspaper's closure was announced in April 2020. Lee Walls, the president and CEO of Walls Newspapers, said that the decision to close the Commercial was due to a loss in ad revenue, attributed to the Great Recession, the impact of the COVID-19 pandemic in Mississippi, and the rise of social media news sources such as those on Facebook.

With social media, a user can choose to have a ‘news’ feed of legitimate stories, incorrect stories, hateful rhetoric, harmful gossip and defamatory commentary. As if that’s not enough, they can have all of that in the form of video or text. You get all of that by simply giving up your personal data and privacy, no money required ... We don’t have the option to compete against that business model because we are held to a higher standard. ... Based on very objective statistics, it is clear that people are choosing social media and to give up their privacy, over community journalism.

— Lee Walls, owner of The Bolivar Commercial, on its closure

At the time of its closure, the newspaper employed nine full-time employees and one part-time employee. The newspaper operated at a loss for many years, which was personally covered by Walls. The closure of the Commercial was the only newspaper closure in the state during the pandemic, though publications across the state furloughed staff and cut back publication schedules. Cleveland, Mississippi, resident Scott Coopwood, a publisher of two magazines based in the Delta, announced he would begin the publication of a new newspaper, The Bolivar Bullet to fill the gap left by the Commercial.
