= L.V. Banks =

American singer (1932–2011)

- Born: October 28, 1932; Stringtown, Mississippi, United States
- Died: May 2, 2011 (aged 78) Chicago, Illinois
- Genres: Chicago blues, electric blues, soul blues
- Occupations: Guitarist, singer, songwriter
- Instruments: Guitar, vocals
- Years active: 1960s–2011
- Label: Wolf

L.V. Banks (October 28, 1932 – May 2, 2011) was an American Chicago blues and soul blues guitarist, singer and songwriter. He was a respected club performer in Chicago for many years. He recorded two albums for Wolf Records.

== Life and career ==
Banks was born in Stringtown, Mississippi. He taught himself to play the guitar and fronted a blues band in Greenville, Mississippi. His musical influences included B.B. King, Howlin' Wolf, and Little Milton. Banks moved to St. Louis, Missouri, before he was drafted into the U.S. Army. After his duty was over, in the early 1960s, he relocated to Chicago, Illinois. He played on Maxwell Street and later was a regular fixture for over three decades in local clubs, particularly on the South Side. In the early 1990s, Banks acted as mentor to the then-teenaged blues musician Marty Sammon.

Banks's debut album, Let Me Be Your Teddy Bear, was released in June 1998 on the Austrian label Wolf. John Primer played guitar on the album. A second album, Ruby, was released by Wolf in 2000. It was his final album.

He died of heart failure in the South Shore Hospital, in Chicago, in May 2011, aged 78. His son, Tre' is following his father's tradition as a Chicago-based blues musician.

== Discography ==
Year	Title	Record label
1998	Let Me Be Your Teddy Bear	Wolf Records
2000	Ruby	Wolf Records

== See also ==
- List of Chicago blues musicians
- List of soul-blues musicians
