= Litton, Mississippi =

- Unincorporated community
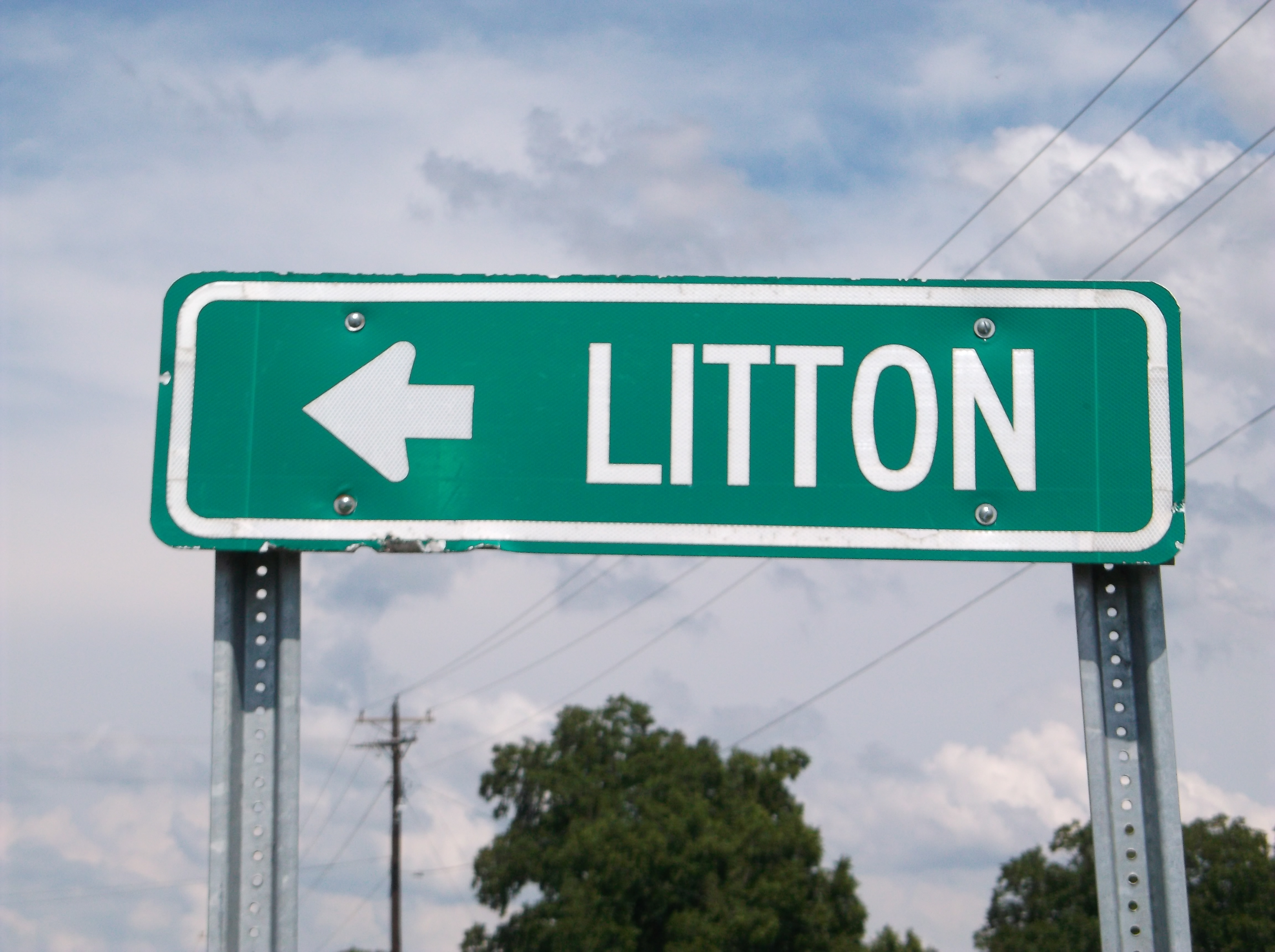
- Highway sign in Litton

- Location within Mississippi Location within the United States
- Coordinates: 33°38′45″N 90°50′14″W
- Country: United States
- State: Mississippi
- County: Bolivar
- Elevation: 131 ft (40 m)
- Time zone: UTC-6 (Central (CST))
  - Summer (DST): UTC-5 (CDT)
- ZIP code: 38773
- Area code: 662
- GNIS feature ID: 692007

Litton, (also known as Ivy), is an unincorporated community located in Bolivar County, Mississippi, United States. Litton is approximately 10 miles (16 km) east of Benoit and approximately 7 miles (11 km) north of Shaw.

A post office operated under the name Ivy from 1900 to 1913.
