= Grace Episcopal Church (Rosedale, Mississippi) =

Historic church in Mississippi, United States

- U.S. National Register of Historic Places
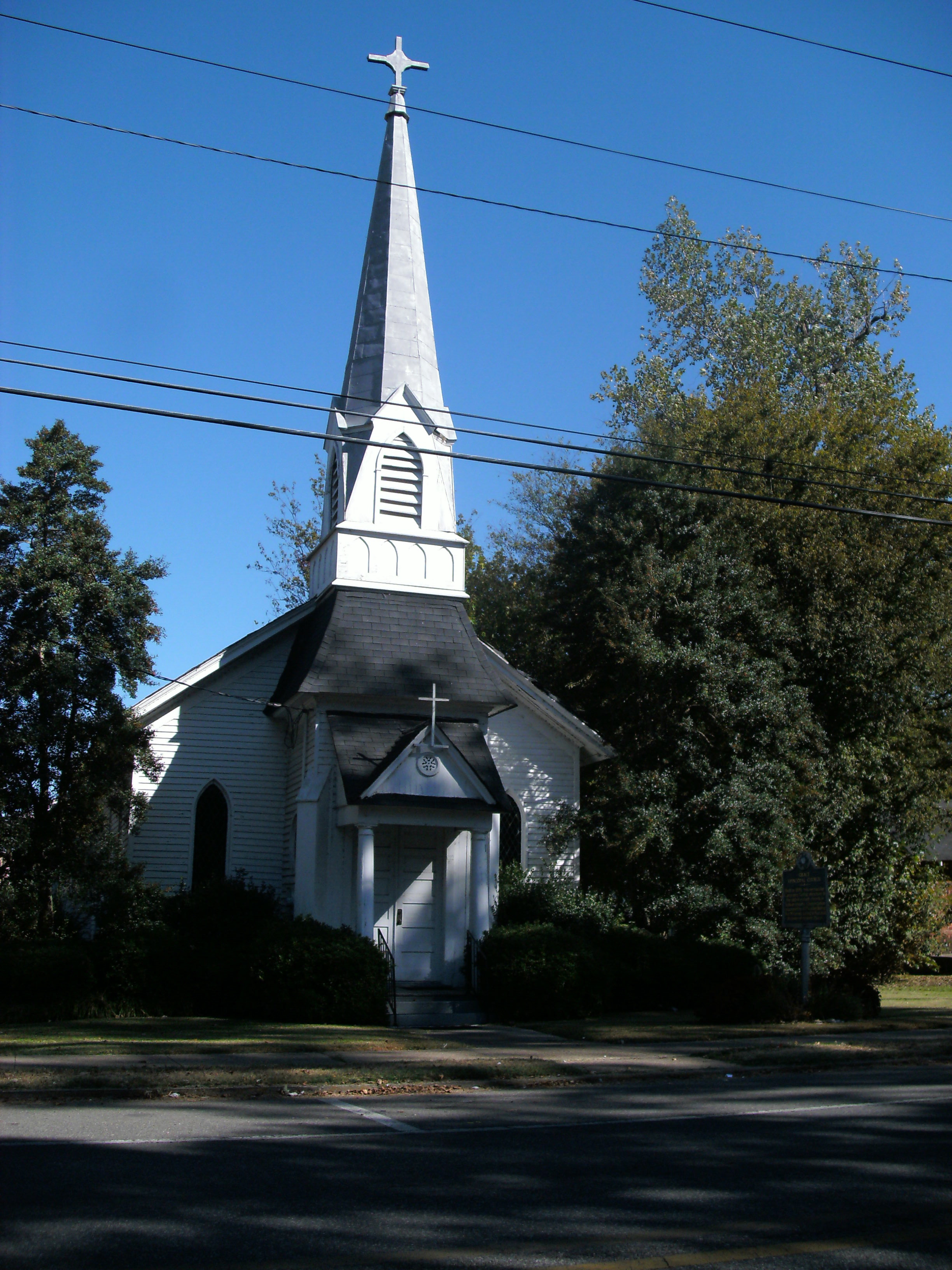

- Location within Mississippi Location within the United States
- Location: 203 Main St., Rosedale, Mississippi
- Coordinates: 33°51′22″N 91°1′38″W
- Area: less than one acre
- Built: 1879
- Architectural style: Late Gothic Revival, Carpenter Gothic
- MPS: Rosedale Historic District
- NRHP reference No.: 80002202
- Added to NRHP: December 11, 1980

Grace Episcopal Church is a historic church building, built in 1879 and located at 203 Main Street in Rosedale, Mississippi. It was added to the National Register of Historic Places in 1980, and is part of the Rosedale Historic District since 2000. The site contains a historical marker erected 1987 by the Mississippi Department of Archives and History.

This congregation founded in 1875, under Bishop William M. Green. It is the oldest standing church in the county, with much of the historic architectural details still intact.
