= Joseph Henry Bufford =

Mississippi state legislator

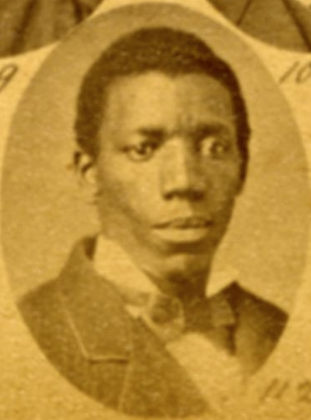
- Joseph Henry Bufford, Mississippi state legislator
- Born: c. 1854; Marshall County, Mississippi, U.S.
- Died: July 16, 1923
- Occupation: Politician
- Known for: Member of the Mississippi House of Representatives

Joseph Henry Bufford (c. 1854 - July 16, 1923) was a state legislator in Mississippi.

He was born in Marshall County, Mississippi. He lived in Rosedale, Mississippi and represented Bolivar County, Mississippi in the Mississippi House of Representatives from 1880 to 1882.

== See also ==
- African American officeholders from the end of the Civil War until before 1900
