= Australia, Mississippi =

Australia
- Former town
- Location within Mississippi Location within the United States
- Coordinates: 34°03′56″N 90°52′40″W
- Country: United States
- State: Mississippi
- County: Bolivar
- Elevation: 157 ft (48 m)
- Time zone: UTC-6 (Central (CST))
  - Summer (DST): UTC-5 (CDT)

Australia (also Australia Landing) is a former town located in Bolivar County, Mississippi, United States. Australia was located on the Mississippi River.

== History ==
Andrew Jackson Donelson, a planter, purchased 1,579 acres (639 ha) of land at Australia in 1857.

Australia had a post office from 1858 to 1908.

The population was 38 in 1900.

The "Cessions Towhead Chute", a cutoff constructed on the Mississippi River, left Australia situated on a narrow channel no longer used for navigation.

Nothing remains of the settlement.
