= Dahomey National Wildlife Refuge =

United States National Wildlife Refuge in Mississippi

- IUCN category IV (habitat/species management area)
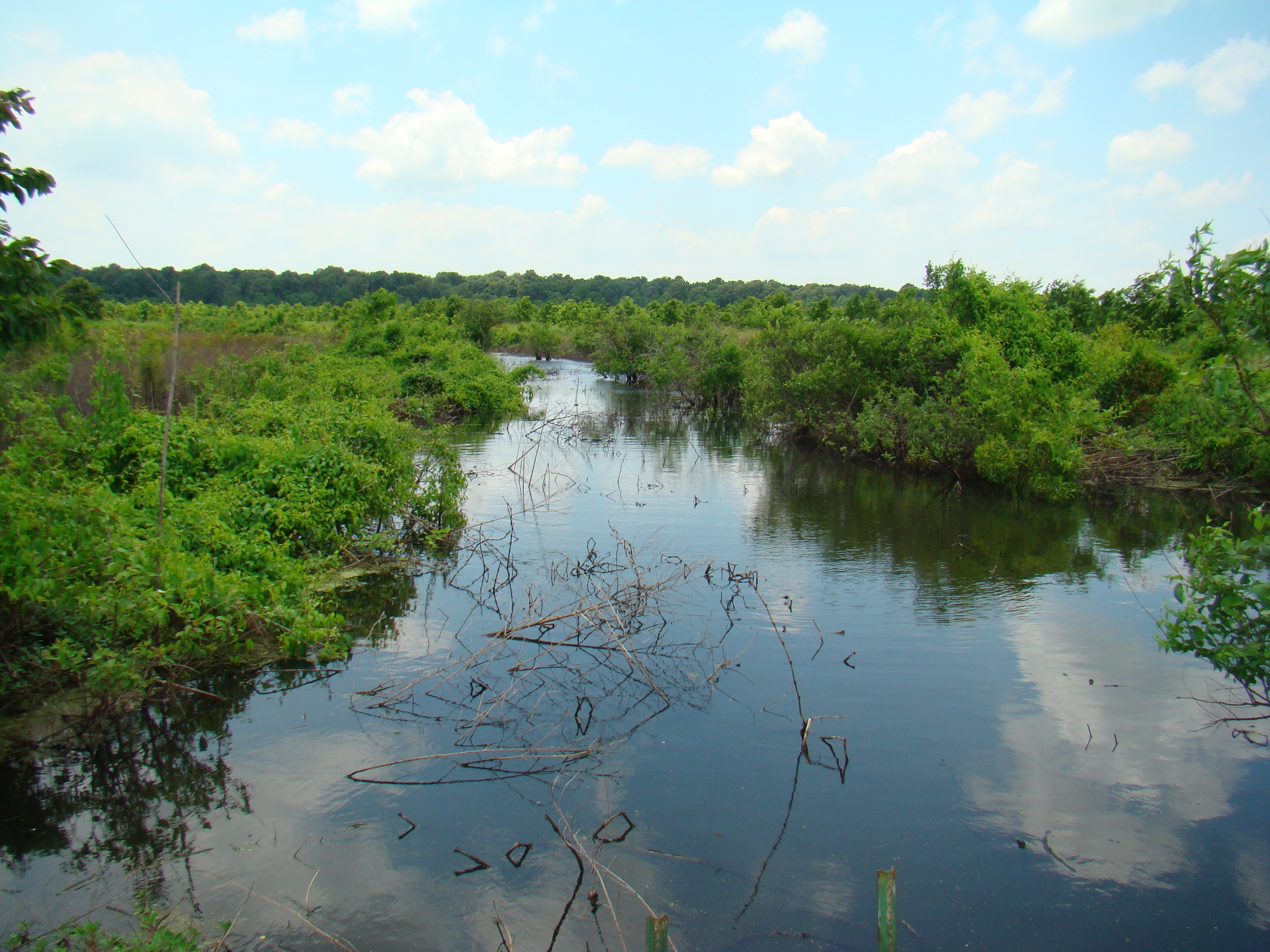
- Pond in Dahomey National Wildlife Refuge

- Location within the United States Location within Mississippi
- Location: Bolivar County, Mississippi, United States
- Nearest city: Cleveland, Mississippi
- Coordinates: 33.7178°N 90.92389°W
- Area: 9,691 acres (39.22 km^{2})
- Established: 1990
- Governing body: U.S. Fish and Wildlife Service
- Website: Dahomey National Wildlife Refuge

Dahomey National Wildlife Refuge is located 15 miles (24 km) southwest of Cleveland, Mississippi, and 2.5 mi (4.0 km) east of the settlement of Dahomy. It was established in 1990 when the Nature Conservancy (TNC) purchased 9,269 acres (37.51 km^{2}) and leased the land back to the United States Fish and Wildlife Service for management. In 1993, the Service completed acquisition of the TNC lands. One additional 162-acre (0.66 km^{2}) tract was purchased by the Mississippi Department of Transportation (MDOT) and turned over to the Service in 1991. A 260-acre 16th section tract is leased from the West Bolivar School Board bringing the total land base to 9,691 acres (39.22 km^{2}). The refuge is the largest remaining tract of bottomland hardwood-forested wetlands in the northwest portion of Mississippi.
