= Prentiss, Bolivar County, Mississippi =

Prentiss, Mississippi
- Ghost town
- Location within Mississippi
- Coordinates: 33°46′19″N 91°5′9″W
- Country: United States
- State: Mississippi
- County: Bolivar
- Elevation: 121 ft (37 m)
- Time zone: UTC-6 (Central (CST))
  - Summer (DST): UTC-5 (CDT)
- GNIS feature ID: 710138

Prentiss (also known as "Wellington", "Indian Point Landing", and "Indian Town") is a ghost town in Bolivar County, Mississippi, United States.

Once a thriving river port and county seat, Prentiss was destroyed during the Civil War, and then washed over by the Mississippi River during the 1870s. There is also a Prentiss, Ms in the Southwest. It is the county seat of Jefferson Davis county.

== History ==
Official records for Wellington began just after 1800, when a few families settled there on the banks of the Mississippi River. Following the War of 1812, soldiers returning home by boat from New Orleans stopped at Wellington, and some remained as settlers.

Wellington was only accessible by boat, and settlers occupied land along the shore and inward no more than a mile. There were no roads east into the dense vegetation and hardwood forest known as bottomlands.

In 1838, Judge Joseph McGuire—one of the earliest settlers and owner of a plantation next to Wellington—was given a contract to cut a road, and a house was purchased for $500 which became the courthouse. In 1840, a new courthouse and a jail were constructed.

Wellington was a lively riverport, and supported gambling houses and saloons.

In 1851, three acres of land were purchased from McGuire for $1000 with a right-of-way to the river of 60 ft (18 m). In 1852, the county records were moved to Wellington, and it became the county seat.

The town was laid out in 1856, and renamed "Prentiss", after Seargent Smith Prentiss, a Congressman from Mississippi and noted orator.

Just prior to the Civil War, Prentiss had several buildings, a racetrack, a good hotel, and a newspaper, the Bolivar Times. It also had the only ferry crossing of the Mississippi between Vicksburg and Memphis.

=== Civil War and destruction ===
North of Prentiss, the river followed a sharp curve east into Mississippi along what was then called the "Beulah Bend" (now Lake Beulah). During the Civil War, Confederate soldiers would move east by foot from Napoleon, Arkansas, hide in a wooded area near the bend, and then fire on passing Union ships. The bend was so tight that the same cannon could be used on ships as they entered, and then left Beulah Bend.

Following one such ambush in 1862, a Union gunship led by William Tecumseh Sherman landed at Prentiss and burned the town to the ground. Just one small building on the outskirts was spared. Efforts to rebuild began immediately.

Seeking to permanently avoid the ambush point at Beulah Bend, Union commander Thomas Oliver Selfridge ordered a channel dug across the peninsula around which Beulah Bend flowed. The soft land and strong river current enabled the "Napoleon Channel" to be cut in just a day. The Napoleon Channel improved the Mississippi River for shipping, as it removed 10 mi (16 km) from the navigable route. Unfortunately, the diverted river currents caused by the Napoleon Channel caused both Prentiss and Napoleon to be completely submerged within a few years.

=== Reappearance of ruins ===
After decades under water, Prentiss briefly reappeared in 1954 when two hunters spotted chimneys and the side of a brick wall during a period of low water on the Mississippi River. Other silt-covered buildings were soon discovered, prompting thousands of visitors to come see the ruined town. Soon after, high waters on the Mississippi again submerged the town.
