= Zumbro, Mississippi =

- Unincorporated community
- Location within Mississippi Location within the United States
- Coordinates: 33°46′46″N 90°40′34″W
- Country: United States
- State: Mississippi
- County: Bolivar
- Elevation: 141 ft (43 m)
- Time zone: UTC-6 (Central (CST))
  - Summer (DST): UTC-5 (CDT)
- ZIP code: 38732
- Area code: 662
- GNIS feature ID: 680054

Zumbro is an unincorporated community located in Bolivar County, Mississippi, United States, east of Renova.

Zumbro is named for the former Zumbro Plantation. The 5,000 acre plantation was founded in 1898 by Joseph L. Smith.

== Notable person ==
- Charley Patton, Delta blues musician. Lived for a time in Zumbro.
