= Frederick Notrebe =

Early settler of Arkansas

- Born: 1780; France
- Died: April 4, 1849 (aged 68–69); New Orleans, Louisiana
- Occupation: Merchant
- Known for: Early settler and wealthy businessman in Arkansas Post
- Spouse: Mary Felicite Bellette (m. 1811)
- Children: 6
- Military service
- Allegiance: France

Frederick Notrebe (1780 – April 4, 1849) was an early settler and businessman in Arkansas Post, Arkansas. A Frenchman and former soldier, Notrebe immigrated to the United States around the year 1810 and soon moved to Arkansas Post. He originally was involved with the fur trade and trade with the Native Americans, but became a dominant figure in the eastern Arkansas cotton market, both growing his own cotton and purchasing cotton from others for resale. He was one of the founders of Napoleon, Arkansas, which he named after Napoleon Bonaparte. Having to conduct some of his business on the barter basis and desiring greater circulation of money in the region, Notrebe helped bring a branch of the State Bank of Arkansas to Arkansas Post, for which purposes he donated land.

Notrebe's land holdings grew to 5,500 acres (2,200 ha) and he owned 119 slaves; for a time he was the largest slaveholder in Arkansas County, Arkansas. He entertained many notable guests at his home, including Albert Pike and Washington Irving; Notrebe may have been the inspiration for a character in Irving's short story "The Creole Village". Notrebe died in 1849 of either cholera or pneumonia in New Orleans, Louisiana.

== Biography ==
Little is known about the early life of Frederick Notrebe. He was born in France in 1780. That he served in the French military is known, but the details of this are unclear. Some sources state that he served under Bon-Adrien Jeannot de Moncey, while others indicate service during the time of the French Consulate. It is possible that he was a soldier during the Peninsular War. Notrebe was an admirer of Napoleon Bonaparte. Circa 1810, Notrebe immigrated to the United States of America. According to archaeologist Kathleen Cande, Notrebe entered the country at New Orleans, Louisiana Territory before moving to Arkansas Post. By 1811, Notrebe owned a house in Arkansas Post, and another early settler later stated that Notrebe was there in mid-1810. He married Mary Felicite Bellette (Note: Also spelled Billette) in 1811, she was 17 at the time. According to George William Featherstonhaugh, Mary was a Creole with some Native American ancestry. Boyd W. Johnson, in a biographical article about Notrebe, writes that the couple had "at least five" children, while Cande states that the couple had six. A contemporary stated that Notrebe had a dark complexion and black hair.

Notrebe traded with the Native Americans for bear oil and pelts, and became a successful businessman, eventually owning a plantation 3 miles (4.8 km) from Arkansas Post. A business partnership with Antoine Barraque for trading and fur trapping employed over 100 people. Notrebe owned 119 slaves, the first of which was acquired in 1817. Notrebe first expanded his business interests from the trading operation to include the ownership of a dry goods store. In 1819, he entered the cotton trade, and in the words of Cande, "eventually had a virtual monopoly on the cotton market in eastern Arkansas". Notrebe's prominence in cotton growing was the result of the high quality of the cotton he grew; he experimented with foreign strains of cotton. After constructing a cotton gin in 1827, Notrebe made improvements to it that reduced the risk of fire. Besides producing cotton under his own auspices, Notrebe would purchase cotton from others, often contracting with local farmers at the beginning of the growing season to purchase their entire crop; after paying cash for the cotton, he would ship it down to New Orleans. According to Arkansas County tax records, between 1825 and 1840, his property grew from 800 acres (320 ha) to 5,400 acres (2,200 ha) and from 8 "taxable slaves" to 43; he was the largest slaveholder in Arkansas County in 1840. Notrebe alone accounted for 18% of the increase in taxable property for the entire county. His land holdings eventually grew to 5,500 acres (2,200 ha) across what became five counties in Arkansas. The historian S. Charles Bolton describes Notrebe, as of 1840, as "the only merchant of note in Arkansas Post". By 1830, the Arkansas Post area had become a major cotton production area, predicated upon slave labor and the development of the steamboat.

He was one of the founders of Napoleon, Arkansas, which he named after the French leader. A shortage of currency in the region resulted in Notrebe having to carry on some of his business on the barter basis. Desiring more circulation of money in the region, Notrebe helped bring a branch of the State Bank of Arkansas to Arkansas Post, and donated land for the site of the bank branch, which was built in 1839. The Arkansas Post region entered into an economic downturn after the 1830s; the State Bank of Arkansas failed in 1843 and the Arkansas Post branch building eventually became a stable.

He was known as Colonel Notrebe; this may have been an honorary title originating with his French military service and informally bestowed by his friends, or an actual rank derived from service in the militias of the Missouri Territory and the Arkansas Territory. He entertained a number of important visitors, including Albert Pike, Washington Irving, and Territorial Governor John Pope; Pope was surprised to find that Notrebe had silverware, cut glass, and a number of servants in the frontier setting of Arkansas Post; after the territorial capital had relocated to Little Rock in 1821, many of the Arkansas Territory's leading citizens had moved to that city. Notrebe may have been the inspiration for a character in Irving's short story "The Creole Village".

Notrebe died while on a business trip to New Orleans, on April 4, 1849. An article published in the Arkansas Democrat attributed his death to pneumonia, but Johnson notes that his death has also been attributed to cholera. Johnson describes his will as "one of the most unusual legal documents on record at the court house in DeWitt". Cande notes that one source claims Notrebe was buried at Arkansas Post but that the Arkansas River later washed the grave away.

== Sources ==
- Bolton, S. Charles (1998). Arkansas 1800–1860: Remote and Restless. Fayetteville, Arkansas: University of Arkansas Press. ISBN 1-55728-519-5.
- Bolton, S. Charles (2019). Territorial Ambition: Land and Society in Arkansas, 1800–1840. Fayetteville, Arkansas: University of Arkansas Press. ISBN 978-1-61075-687-7.
- Cande, Kathleen H. (December 7, 2023). "Frederick Notrebe (1780–1840)". Encyclopedia of Arkansas.
- Coleman, Roger E. (1987). The Arkansas Post Story: Arkansas Post National Memorial (PDF). Santa Fe, New Mexico: Southwest Cultural Resources Center.
- Johnson, Boyd W. (1962). "Frederick Notrebe". The Arkansas Historical Quarterly. 21 (3): 269–283.
