= Beulah, Mississippi =

- Town
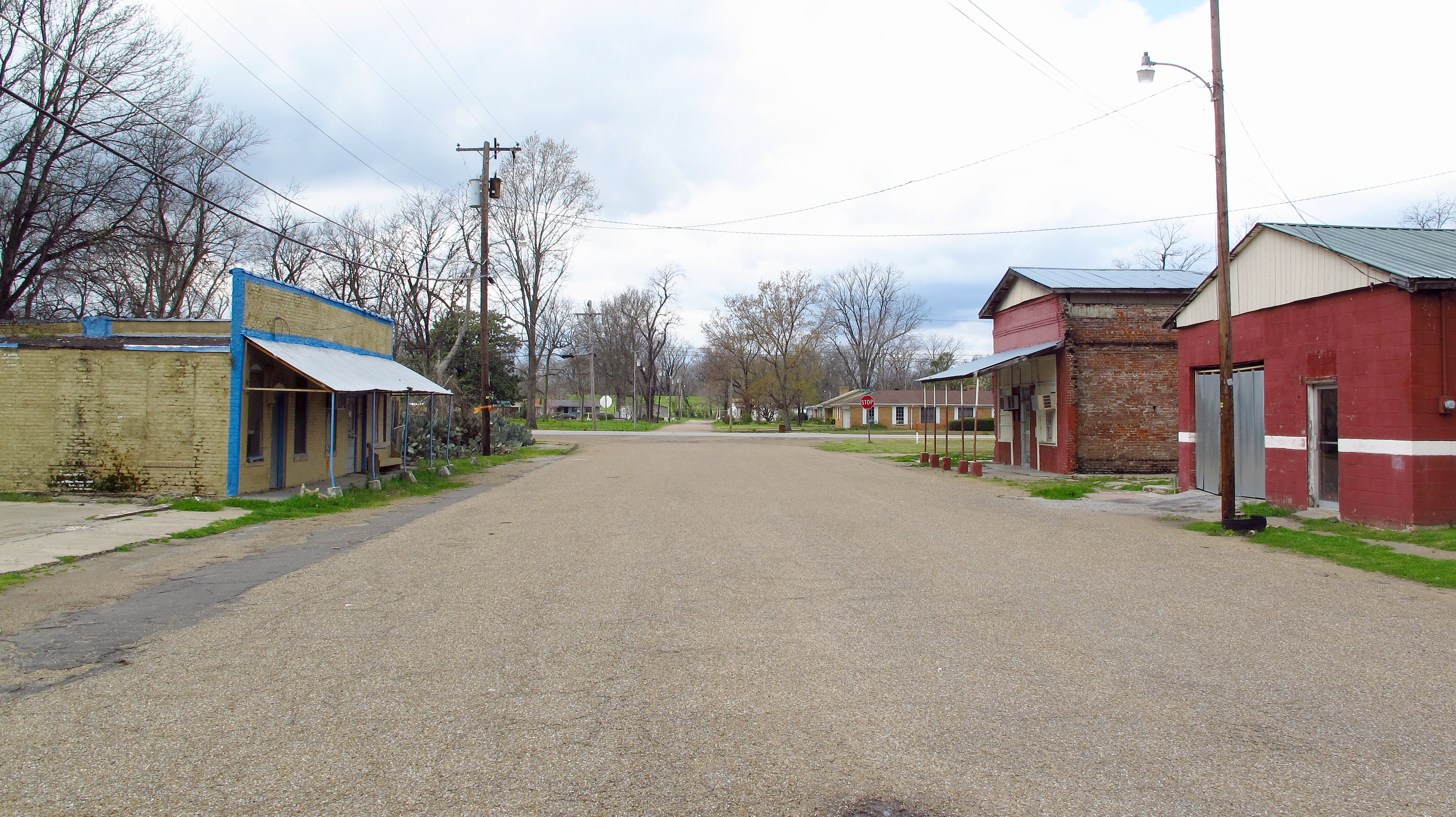
- Main Street in Beulah

- Location of Beulah, Mississippi

- Location in the United States
- Coordinates: 33°47′26″N 90°58′49″W
- Country: United States
- State: Mississippi
- County: Bolivar

Area
  - Total: 0.46 sq mi (1.20 km^{2})
  - Land: 0.46 sq mi (1.20 km^{2})
  - Water: 0 sq mi (0.00 km^{2})
- Elevation: 144 ft (44 m)

Population (2020)
  - Total: 242
  - Density: 522.4/sq mi (201.71/km^{2})
- Time zone: UTC-6 (Central (CST))
  - Summer (DST): UTC-5 (CDT)
- ZIP code: 38726
- Area code: 662
- FIPS code: 28-05820
- GNIS feature ID: 2405258

Beulah is a town in Bolivar County, Mississippi, United States. Per the 2020 census, the population was 242.

Beulah is served by Mississippi Highway 1. Lake Beulah, an oxbow lake formerly connected to the Mississippi River, is west of the town. The Illinois Central Railroad had a station in Beulah, but the line is now abandoned.

Beulah is named after the Christian hymn Beulah Land, a favorite of Frank A. Montgomery, an early settler to western Bolivar County.

== History ==
The land southwest of Beulah was owned by a Choctaw family in the 1830s. A series of lawsuits caused them to lose their land, and Charles Clark took ownership. Clark established the Doro Plantation during the late 1840s and early 1850s, which grew to over 5,000 acres (2,000 ha) and became the most prosperous slave-owning plantation in the region. It continued to operate after the end of slavery until 1913. During that time, the Mississippi River flowed next to Beulah along "Beulah Bend" (now Lake Beulah), and Clark was often visited by Mark Twain while writing Life on the Mississippi.

In 1858, Frank A. Montgomery purchased a tract of land along the river north of the Doro Plantation and established a plantation. Beulah was one of its villages.

Mississippi River boats landed at points in the community, and there was a noted river trade. Freshwater clam harvesting – "clammin" – enabled a thriving pearl button industry.

In 1863, Union soldiers altered the course of the river by constructing a channel to avoid Beulah Bend, and the town became shut off from river commerce. The pearl button industry declined, as freshwater clams tend to concentrate in the bends of rivers, though many families still participate in clam harvesting at places they can access the river. Altering the river's course also destroyed the nearby towns of Prentiss and Napoleon.

In 1866, Montgomery donated the village of Beulah to the county, and gave $1,600 to build a courthouse. A two-room log jail was also built. Beulah became the first county seat, and had a Masonic Lodge, church, school, bank, stores, and post office. The Bolivar Times newspaper was also edited there. In 1872, the county seat was moved to Floreyville (now called Rosedale).

After the Civil War, numerous freedmen bought and cleared land in the bottomlands away from the river. By 1910, declining financial and social conditions had caused most to lose their land, forcing them to work as sharecroppers and laborers. Beginning in the early 1900s, thousands of blacks left Mississippi as part of the Great Migration north by railroad to Chicago and other northern industrial cities, but others remained, with strong local ties.

Blues musician W. C. Handy once invited Charley Patton to watch his band perform in Beulah. Patton got in free, and when he observed that Handy's musicians were all strict score-reading performers, he gave up all ambition of playing with their band.

Beulah was mentioned in Eudora Welty's Death of a Traveling Salesman:

Bowman had wanted to reach Beulah by dark, to go to bed and sleep off his fatigue. As he remembered, Beulah was fifty miles away from the last town, on a graveled road. This was only a cow trail. How had he ever come to such a place? One hand wiped the sweat from his face, and he drove on.

In 1970, Beulah was chosen as the site for a large event by the Southern Female Rights Union.

Part of the movie Crossroads was filmed in Beulah.

== Geography ==
According to the United States Census Bureau, the town has a total area of 0.5 square miles (1.3 km^{2}), all land.

=== Climate ===
The climate in this area is characterized by hot, humid summers and generally mild to cool winters. According to the Köppen Climate Classification system, Beulah has a humid subtropical climate, abbreviated "Cfa" on climate maps.

== Demographics ==
Historical population
Census	Pop.	Note	%±
1930	506		—
1940	347		−31.4%
1950	342		−1.4%
1960	421		23.1%
1970	443		5.2%
1980	431		−2.7%
1990	460		6.7%
2000	473		2.8%
2010	348		−26.4%
2020	242		−30.5%
U.S. Decennial Census; 2010 2020

=== Racial and ethnic composition ===
Beulah town, Mississippi – Racial and ethnic composition Note: the US Census treats Hispanic/Latino as an ethnic category. This table excludes Latinos from the racial categories and assigns them to a separate category. Hispanics/Latinos may be of any race.
Race / Ethnicity (NH = Non-Hispanic)	Pop 2000	Pop 2010	Pop 2020	% 2000	% 2010	% 2020
White alone (NH)	12	25	13	2.54%	7.18%	5.37%
Black or African American alone (NH)	454	317	218	95.98%	91.09%	90.08%
Native American or Alaska Native alone (NH)	0	0	1	0.00%	0.00%	0.41%
Asian alone (NH)	4	2	4	0.85%	0.57%	1.65%
Native Hawaiian or Pacific Islander alone (NH)	1	0	0	0.21%	0.00%	0.00%
Other race alone (NH)	0	0	0	0.00%	0.00%	0.00%
Mixed race or Multiracial (NH)	2	0	3	0.42%	0.00%	1.24%
Hispanic or Latino (any race)	0	4	3	0.00%	1.15%	1.24%
Total	473	348	242	100.00%	100.00%	100.00%

=== 2000 census ===
As of the census of 2000, there were 473 people, 139 households, and 108 families residing in the town. The population density was 1,027.5 inhabitants per square mile (396.7/km^{2}). There were 151 housing units at an average density of 328.0 per square mile (126.6/km^{2}). The racial makeup of the town was 2.54% White, 95.98% African American, 0.85% Asian, 0.21% Pacific Islander, and 0.42% from two or more races.

There were 139 households, out of which 46.8% had children under the age of 18 living with them, 28.1% were married couples living together, 38.8% had a female householder with no husband present, and 21.6% were non-families. 19.4% of all households were made up of individuals, and 5.8% had someone living alone who was 65 years of age or older. The average household size was 3.40 and the average family size was 3.83.

In the town, the population was spread out, with 38.9% under the age of 18, 9.9% from 18 to 24, 31.5% from 25 to 44, 12.7% from 45 to 64, and 7.0% who were 65 years of age or older. The median age was 26 years. For every 100 females, there were 87.0 males. For every 100 females age 18 and over, there were 72.0 males.

The median income for a household in the town was $24,861, and the median income for a family was $25,341. Males had a median income of $22,500 versus $19,205 for females. The per capita income for the town was $8,631. About 31.8% of families and 33.8% of the population were below the poverty line, including 40.3% of those under age 18 and 44.0% of those age 65 or over.

== Education ==
Beulah is served by the West Bolivar School District.
