= Waxhaw, Mississippi =

- Unincorporated community
- Location within Mississippi Location within the United States
- Coordinates: 33°55′03″N 90°58′09″W
- Country: United States
- State: Mississippi
- County: Bolivar
- Elevation: 151 ft (46 m)
- Time zone: UTC-6 (Central (CST))
  - Summer (DST): UTC-5 (CDT)
- ZIP code: 38769
- Area code: 662
- GNIS feature ID: 692312

Waxhaw is an unincorporated community located in Bolivar County, Mississippi, United States. Waxhaw is approximately 3 miles (4.8 km) south of Gunnison and approximately 6 miles (9.7 km) north of Rosedale. It was also known as Waxhaw Plantation. Waxhaw is located on the former Yazoo and Mississippi Valley Railroad.

A post office operated under the name Waxhaw from 1927 to 1955.

The community was named after the Waxhaw people.

== Notable person ==
Otis Clay, R&B/soul singer
