= Choctaw, Bolivar County, Mississippi =

Uninicorporated community in Bolivar County, Mississippi, United States

Choctaw, Mississippi
- Unincorporated community
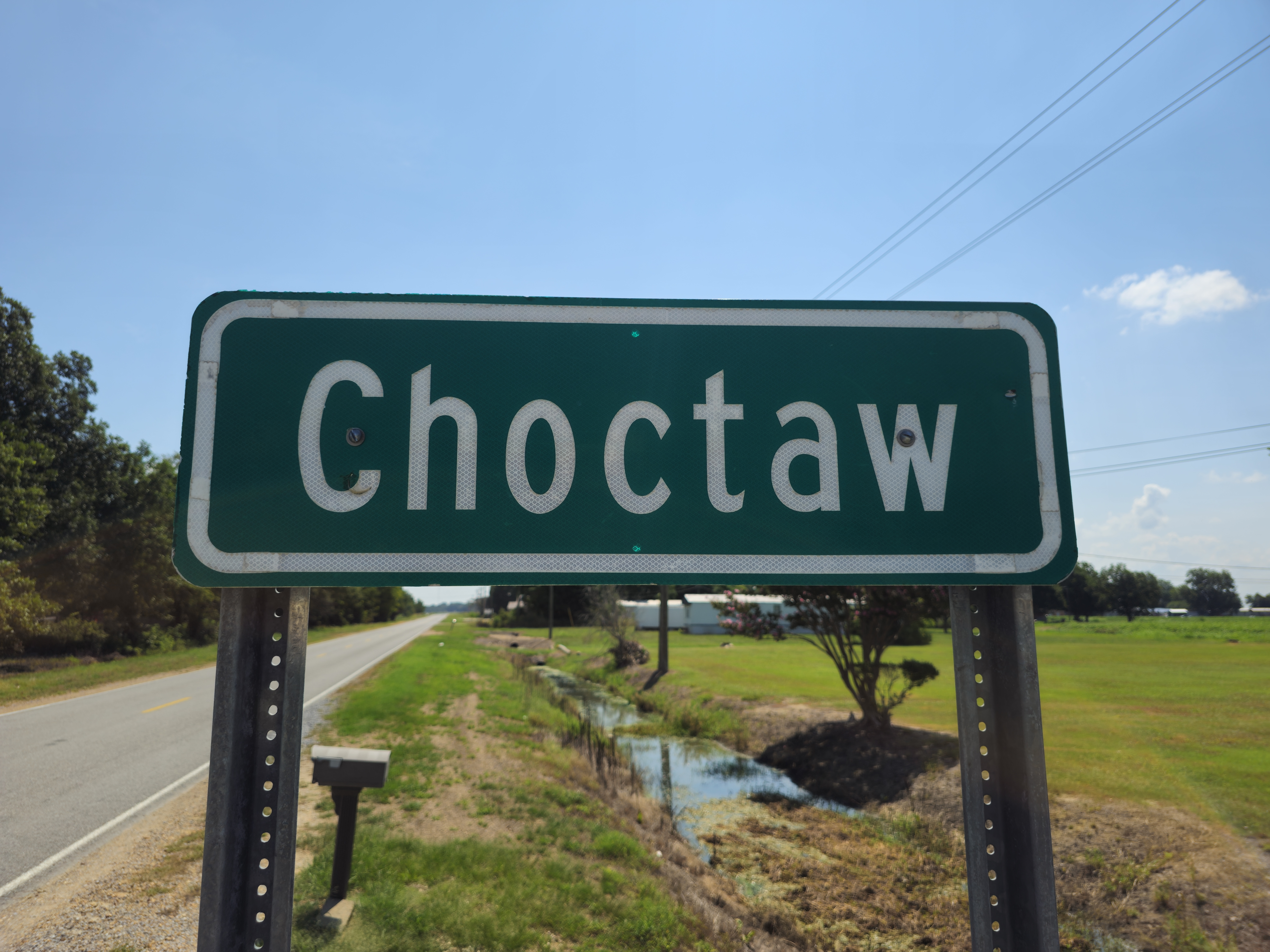
- Highway sign in Choctaw

- Location within Mississippi Location within the United States
- Coordinates: 33°33′28″N 90°48′47″W
- Country: United States
- State: Mississippi
- County: Bolivar
- Elevation: 128 ft (39 m)
- Time zone: UTC-6 (Central (CST))
  - Summer (DST): UTC-5 (CDT)
- ZIP code: 38773
- Area code: 662
- GNIS feature ID: 668406

Choctaw is an unincorporated community in Bolivar County, Mississippi, United States.

== Descriptipon ==
Choctaw is approximately four miles (6.4 km) south of Shaw and approximately twelve miles (19 km) east of Stringtown, served by Mississippi Highway 450.

It is named for the Choctaw, one of the Five Civilized Tribes of the Southeast, who were indigenous to this area at the time of European settlement. Most of the Choctaw were forced to remove to Indian Territory west of the Mississippi River in the 1830s. The federally recognized Mississippi Band of Choctaw Indians is made up of descendants of those who remained in the territory and later state.

A post office operated under the name Choctaw from 1895 to 1920.
