= Lake Beulah (Arkansas–Mississippi) =

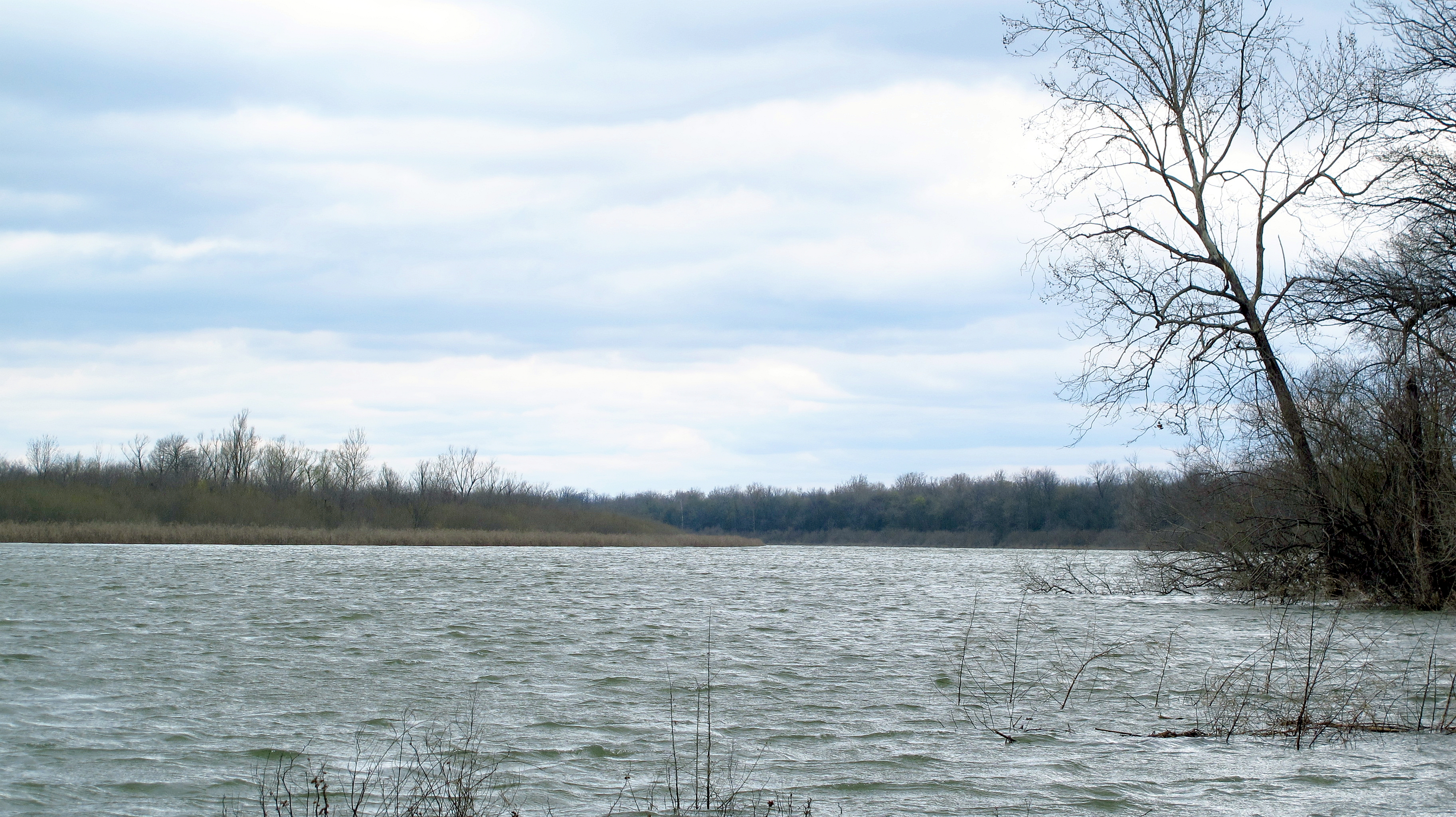

- Location within Mississippi Location within the United States
- Location: Bolivar County, Mississippi, Desha County, Arkansas, United States
- Coordinates: 33°46′28″N 90°59′36″W
- Lake type: Oxbow lake
- Basin countries: United States
- Surface area: 1,031 acres (417 ha)
- Average depth: between 6 ft (1.8 m) and 20 ft (6.1 m)
- Surface elevation: 121 ft (37 m) at normal pool

Lake Beulah is an oxbow lake located in Bolivar County, Mississippi and Desha County, Arkansas, United States. The Arkansas-Mississippi border follows the center of the narrow, curving lake.

The town of Beulah, Mississippi is located on the east shore, where there is a public boat launch.

Duckweed is the predominant aquatic vegetation, and fish include bowfin, bream, buffalo, channel catfish, common carp, crappie, drum, green sunfish, gar and largemouth bass.

== History ==
Prior to 1863, the Mississippi River curved east and flowed around the 10 mi (16 km) "Beulah Bend". During the Civil War, soldiers of the Confederate Army would move east by foot from nearby Napoleon, Arkansas, and hide in the wooded area west of Beulah Bend, where they would fire at passing Union Army ships. The same cannon could be used on ships as they entered, and then left the tight bend. To avoid this ambush point, Union commander Thomas Oliver Selfridge ordered a channel dug across the peninsula. The soft land and strong river current enabled the "Napoleon Channel" to be cut in one day, and in April 1863, Selfridge piloted the USS Conestoga along the new route.

Cut off from the main flow of the Mississippi River, the ends of Beulah Bend filled in, forming an oxbow lake.

While the Napoleon Channel enabled river traffic to follow a more direct route, the river's new course caused its waters to flow close to the town of Napoleon, then the seat of Desha County. High waters in 1868 and 1874 destroyed and permanently submerged part of the town, and by 1882, it was no longer shown on river maps.
