= Rosedale, Mississippi =

- City
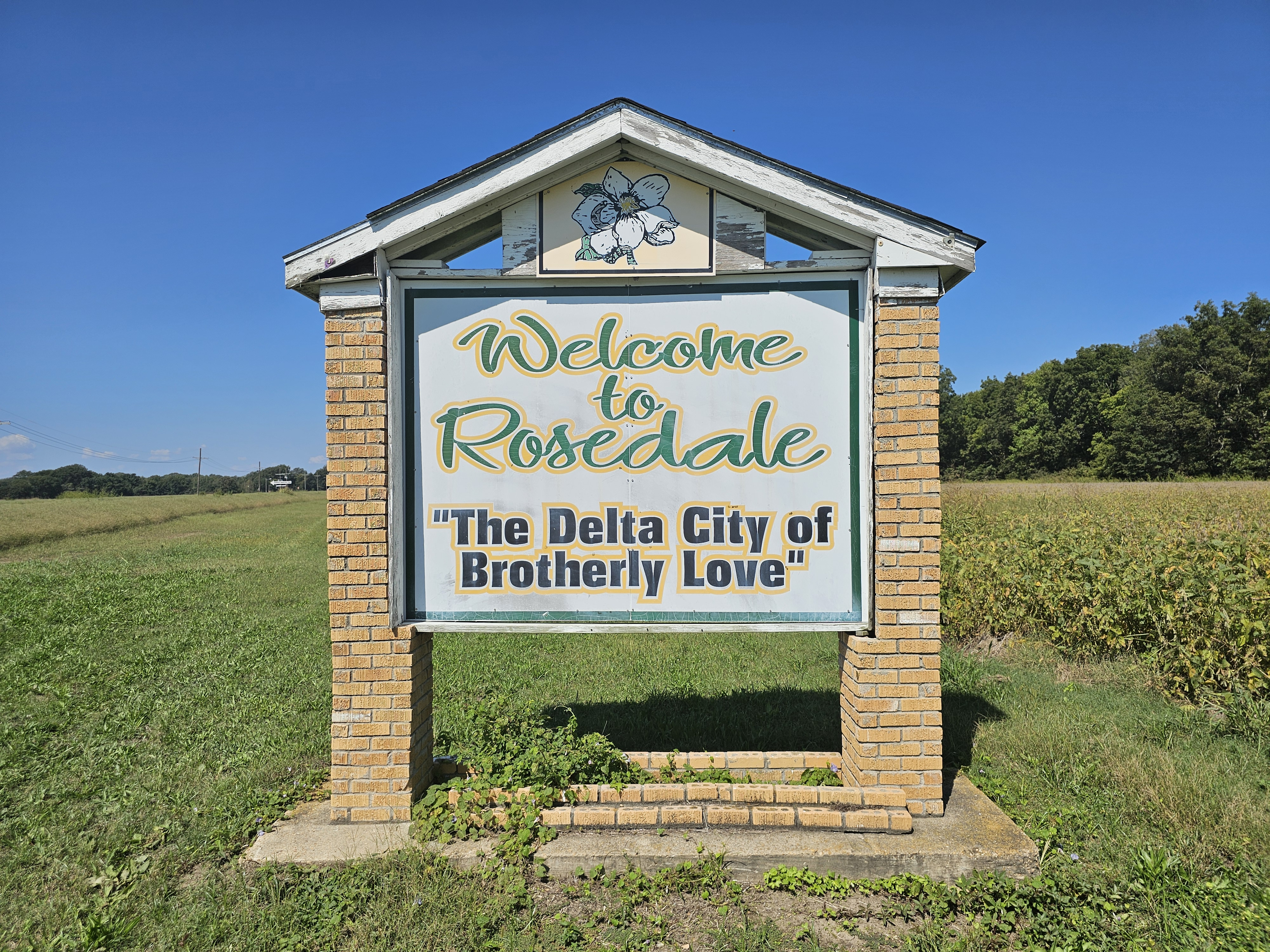
- Welcome sign in Rosedale
- Motto: The Delta City of Brotherly Love
- Location of Rosedale, Mississippi

- Location in the United States
- Coordinates: 33°51′09″N 91°02′02″W
- Country: United States
- State: Mississippi
- County: Bolivar

Area
  - Total: 5.48 sq mi (14.19 km^{2})
  - Land: 5.41 sq mi (14.02 km^{2})
  - Water: 0.062 sq mi (0.16 km^{2})
- Elevation: 138 ft (42 m)

Population (2020)
  - Total: 1,584
  - Density: 292.5/sq mi (112.95/km^{2})
- Time zone: UTC-6 (Central (CST))
  - Summer (DST): UTC-5 (CDT)
- ZIP code: 38769
- Area code: 662
- FIPS code: 28-63720
- GNIS feature ID: 2404649
- Website: www.cityofrosedale-ms.com

Rosedale is a city and one of two county seats of Bolivar County, Mississippi, United States, the other seat being Cleveland. As of the 2020 census, Rosedale had a population of 1,584. Located in an agricultural area, the city had a stop on the Yazoo and Mississippi Valley Railroad, which carried many migrants north out of the area in the first half of the 20th century.

== History ==
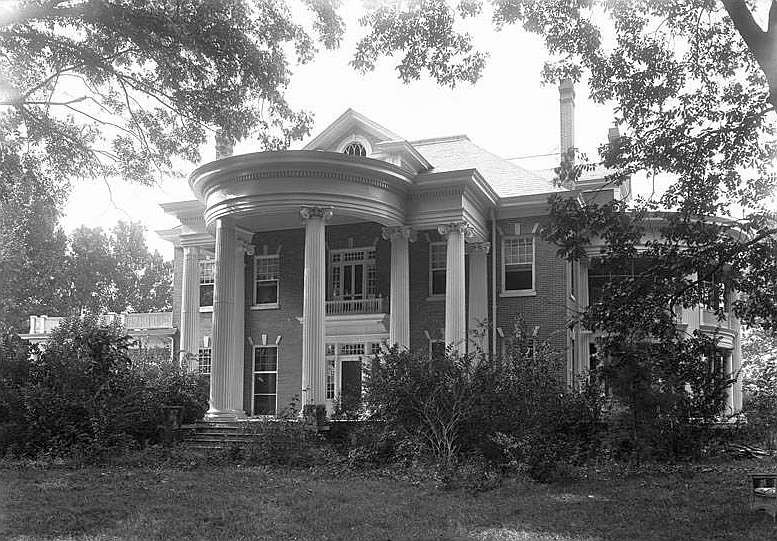
The A. Y. Scott Residence in Rosedale, 1920. Scott was a director of the Rosedale Oil Mill.

Rosedale was settled around 1838 and became one of the two county seats in 1872. This area was developed by European American planters for extensive cotton plantations, dependent on enslaved laborers. After the Civil War and emancipation, some freedmen managed to clear and buy land in the bottomlands, with many becoming landowners before the end of the nineteenth century. By 1910, a lengthy recession and declining economic and political conditions resulted in most blacks in the state losing their land. They could not compete with the financing gained by railroads, which were constructed in the area beginning in 1882 Many stayed in the area to work as sharecroppers and laborers. The railroad brought new business to Rosedale, which had a depot and shipped cotton to northern and other markets. Rosedale incorporated as a town February 2, 1882 and became a city in 1930.

Beginning in the early twentieth century, tens of thousands of blacks left the state of Mississippi as part of the Great Migration, north by railroad to Chicago and other Midwestern industrial cities. During and after World War II, others went to California to work in the defense industry. Others remained where their families had lived for generations, with strong local ties.

In 2007, the Mississippi Blues Commission placed a historic marker at Rosedale's former Yazoo and Mississippi Valley Railroad depot site, designating it as a site on the Mississippi Blues Trail. The marker commemorates the sites in the original lyrics of legendary blues artist Robert Johnson's song "Travelling Riverside Blues". He traced the railway route which ran south from Friars Point to Rosedale among other stops, including Vicksburg and north to Memphis. The marker emphasizes that a common theme of blues songs was riding on the railroad, which was seen as a metaphor for travel and escape from poverty and Jim Crow in the Delta. It also commemorates another common blues theme, life on the banks of a moody river bank, a theme heard in Charlie Patton's "High Water Everywhere".

Locals claim that Johnson sold his soul to the Devil at the intersection of Mississippi state highways 1 and 8, on the south end of town, and that he tells this story metaphorically in "Cross Road Blues." Other artists have referred to his songs. Johnson's deal with the Devil is mentioned as occurring in Rosedale in 1930 in an episode of the TV series Supernatural. However, a number of other Delta municipalities claim that the transaction took place in or near their boundaries.

== Geography ==
Rosedale is located 19 miles (31 km) northwest of Cleveland.

According to the United States Census Bureau, Rosedale has a total area of 5.5 square miles (14.2 km^{2}), of which 5.4 square miles (14.0 km^{2}) is land and 0.08 square miles (0.2 km^{2}), or 1.14%, is water.

Rosedale is situated on the eastern side of the Mississippi River, approximately midway between the mouths of the Arkansas and White rivers, which flow into the Mississippi from the Arkansas (western) side.

== Demographics ==
Historical population
Census	Pop.	Note	%±
1890	376		—
1900	622		65.4%
1910	1,103		77.3%
1920	1,696		53.8%
1930	2,117		24.8%
1940	2,063		−2.6%
1950	2,197		6.5%
1960	2,339		6.5%
1970	2,599		11.1%
1980	2,793		7.5%
1990	2,595		−7.1%
2000	2,414		−7.0%
2010	1,873		−22.4%
2020	1,584		−15.4%
U.S. Decennial Census

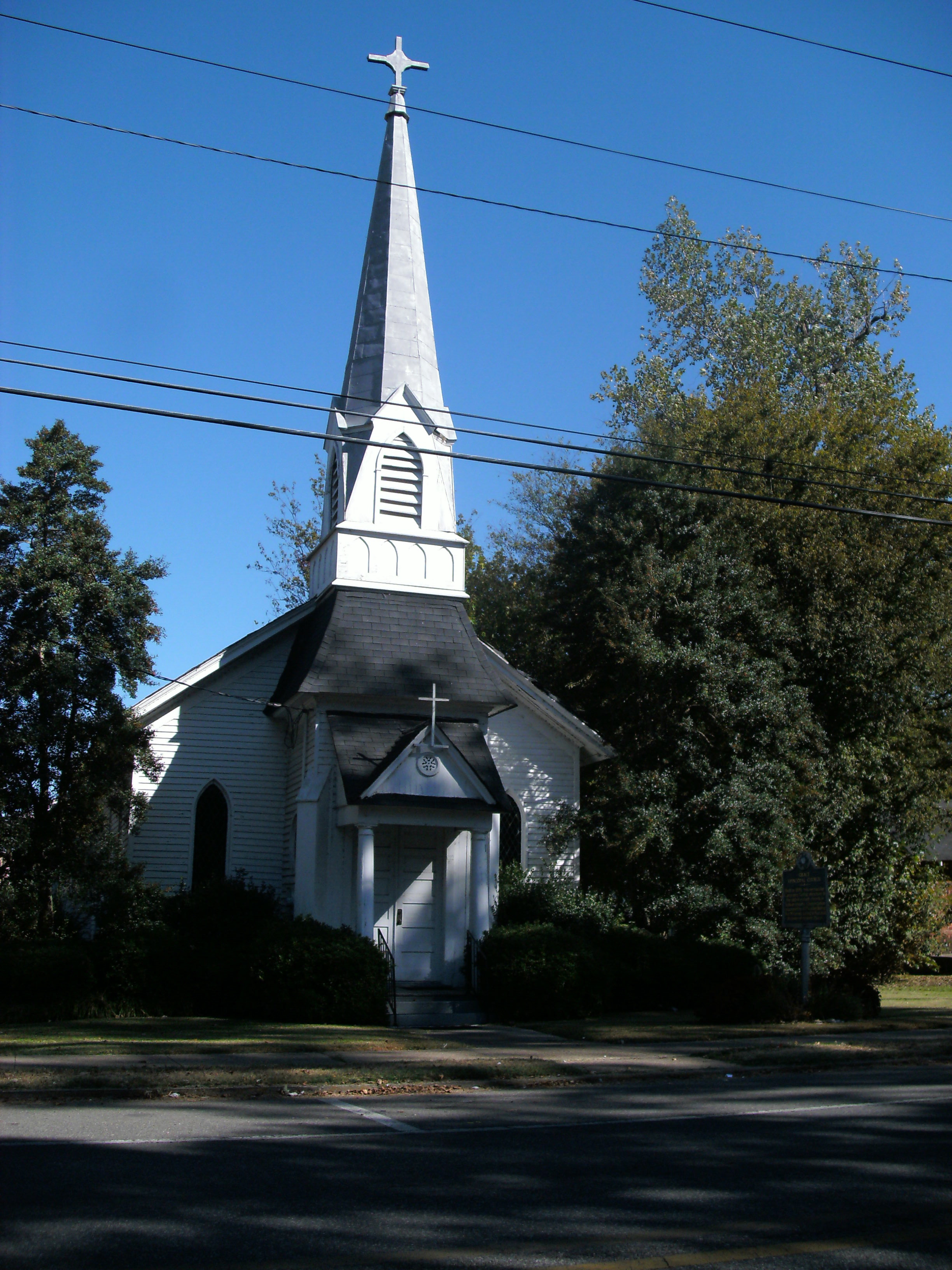
Grace Episcopal Church in Rosedale is listed on the National Register of Historic Places.

=== Racial and ethnic composition ===
Rosedale city, Mississippi – Racial and ethnic composition Note: the US Census treats Hispanic/Latino as an ethnic category. This table excludes Latinos from the racial categories and assigns them to a separate category. Hispanics/Latinos may be of any race.
Race / Ethnicity (NH = Non-Hispanic)	Pop 2000	Pop 2010	Pop 2020	% 2000	% 2010	% 2020
White alone (NH)	406	238	140	16.82%	12.71%	8.84%
Black or African American alone (NH)	1,966	1,621	1,395	81.44%	86.55%	88.07%
Native American or Alaska Native alone (NH)	0	1	1	0.00%	0.05%	0.06%
Asian alone (NH)	9	1	0	0.37%	0.05%	0.00%
Native Hawaiian or Pacific Islander alone (NH)	0	0	0	0.00%	0.00%	0.00%
Other race alone (NH)	1	0	1	0.04%	0.00%	0.06%
Mixed race or Multiracial (NH)	14	9	29	0.58%	0.48%	1.83%
Hispanic or Latino (any race)	18	3	18	0.75%	0.16%	1.14%
Total	2,414	1,873	1,584	100.00%	100.00%	100.00%

=== 2020 census ===
As of the 2020 census, there were 1,584 people, 663 households, and 398 families residing in the city.

The median age was 39.2 years. 26.1% of residents were under the age of 18 and 16.8% of residents were 65 years of age or older. For every 100 females there were 75.2 males, and for every 100 females age 18 and over there were 68.2 males age 18 and over.

0.0% of residents lived in urban areas, while 100.0% lived in rural areas.

There were 663 households in Rosedale, of which 31.8% had children under the age of 18 living in them. Of all households, 17.6% were married-couple households, 21.4% were households with a male householder and no spouse or partner present, and 55.7% were households with a female householder and no spouse or partner present. About 35.5% of all households were made up of individuals and 17.1% had someone living alone who was 65 years of age or older.

There were 752 housing units, of which 11.8% were vacant. The homeowner vacancy rate was 2.0% and the rental vacancy rate was 6.8%.

Racial composition as of the 2020 census
Race	Number	Percent
White	141	8.9%
Black or African American	1,406	88.8%
American Indian and Alaska Native	1	0.1%
Asian	0	0.0%
Native Hawaiian and Other Pacific Islander	0	0.0%
Some other race	2	0.1%
Two or more races	34	2.1%

=== 2000 census ===
As of the census of 2000, there were 2,414 people, 780 households, and 567 families residing in the city. The population density was 444.2 inhabitants per square mile (171.5/km^{2}). There were 842 housing units at an average density of 154.9 per square mile (59.8/km^{2}). The racial makeup of the city was 16.86% White, 82.02% African American, 0.37% Asian, 0.17% from other races, and 0.58% from two or more races. Hispanic or Latino of any race were 0.75% of the population.

There were 780 households, out of which 38.1% had children under the age of 18 living with them, 29.2% were married couples living together, 37.8% had a female householder with no husband present, and 27.3% were non-families. 24.5% of all households were made up of individuals, and 11.4% had someone living alone who was 65 years of age or older. The average household size was 2.99 and the average family size was 3.56.

In the city, the population was spread out, with 34.9% under the age of 18, 10.4% from 18 to 24, 27.2% from 25 to 44, 17.6% from 45 to 64, and 9.9% who were 65 years of age or older. The median age was 28 years. For every 100 females, there were 85.3 males. For every 100 females age 18 and over, there were 78.3 males.

The median income for a household in the city was $17,955, and the median income for a family was $18,810. Males had a median income of $24,922 versus $15,714 for females. The per capita income for the city was $8,534. About 43.3% of families and 46.0% of the population were below the poverty line, including 58.6% of those under age 18 and 34.6% of those age 65 or over.

=== Income and poverty ===
In 2010, Rosedale had the 22nd-lowest median household income of all places in the United States with a population over 1,000.

== Education ==
Rosedale is served by the West Bolivar Consolidated School District (formerly West Bolivar School District). Children in Rosedale are assigned to West Bolivar Elementary School, West Bolivar Middle School, and West Bolivar High School.

The case of Gong Lum v. Rice, wherein the U.S. Supreme Court held that a Chinese student was ineligible to attend the school for white children, and instead, was required to attend the school for colored children, originated in Rosedale.

== Notable people ==
- Travarus Bennett, former professional basketball player
- Dennis Binder, rhythm & blues musician and singer
- Joseph Henry Bufford, state legislator
- Redd Holt, jazz and soul music drummer
- Percy Malone, Arkansas politician and pharmacist
- Cliff Meely, professional basketball player
- W. B. Roberts, lawyer, planter, banker, and legislative leader
- Walter Sillers, lawyer and planter
- Walter Sillers, Jr., segregationist, lawyer and legislative leader
- Florence Sillers Ogden, columnist and segregationist
- Florence Warfield Sillers, historian and socialite
