= Bolivar County, Mississippi =

County in Mississippi, United States

- County
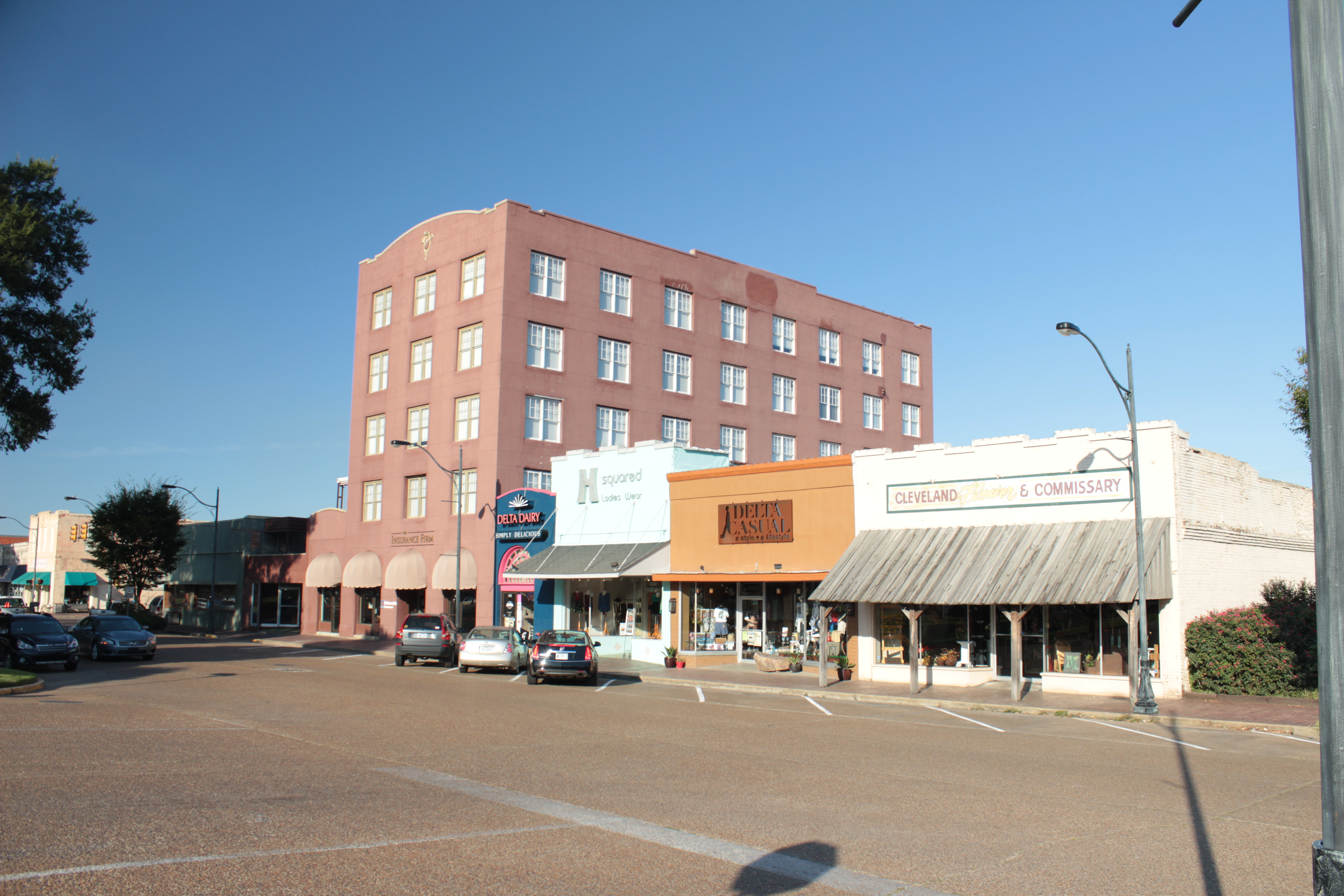
- Historic Grover Hotel in Downtown Cleveland

- Location within the U.S. state of Mississippi
- Country: United States
- State: Mississippi
- Established: February 9, 1836 (190 years ago)
- Named for: Simón Bolívar
- Seat: Rosedale and Cleveland
- Largest city: Cleveland

Area
  - Total: 906 sq mi (2,350 km^{2})
  - Land: 877 sq mi (2,270 km^{2})
  - Water: 29 sq mi (75 km^{2}) 3.2%

Population (2020)
  - Total: 30,985
  - Estimate (2025): 28,262 ▼
  - Density: 35.3/sq mi (13.6/km^{2})
- Time zone: UTC−6 (Central)
  - Summer (DST): UTC−5 (CDT)
- Congressional district: 2nd
- Website: co.bolivar.ms.us

Bolivar County (/ˈbɒlɪvər/ BOL-ih-vər) is a county located on the western border of the U.S. state of Mississippi. As of the 2020 census, the population was 30,985. Its county seats are Rosedale and Cleveland. The county is named in honor of Simón Bolívar, early 19th-century leader of the independence of several South American territories from Spain.

The Cleveland, Mississippi, Micropolitan Statistical Area includes all of Bolivar County. It is located in the Mississippi Delta, or Yazoo Basin, of Mississippi. This area was first developed for cotton plantations. Large industrial-scale agricultural operations have reduced the number of farm workers needed, and the population is half of its peak in 1930. Today, soybeans, corn, and rice are also commodity crops.

== History ==
On February 9, 1836, when it was established, the land was originally Choctaw, and was taken for use in agriculture, with some of the most valued land in the state. In 1840, there was only one free black person, 384 free whites, and 971 enslaved people, making its population 60% slaves. This number only increased, because around 1860, the population was about 87% slaves, due to its lucrative, mostly agricultural economy.

After the Civil War, the county continued to maintain a predominantly black population as freed African American cleared and developed wild bottom lands for agriculture. Additionally, African Americans were drawn to the successful settlement of Mound Bayou, which was founded and run by African Americans. The county had 18 documented lynchings in the period from 1877 to 1950. In the 1920s, Bolivar county was a hotspot for UNIA chapters, with 17 chapters, and by 1960, it had a significant local civil rights movement, and remains a mostly black area today.

== Geography ==
According to the U.S. Census Bureau, the county has a total area of 906 square miles (2,350 km^{2}), of which 877 square miles (2,270 km^{2}) is land and 29 square miles (75 km^{2}) (3.2%) is water. It is the second-largest county in Mississippi by land area and fourth-largest by total area.

=== Major highways ===
- Future Interstate 69
- U.S. Route 61
- Mississippi Highway 1
- Mississippi Highway 8
- Mississippi Highway 32

=== Adjacent counties ===
- Coahoma County (north)
- Sunflower County (east)
- Washington County (south)
- Desha County, Arkansas (west)

=== National protected area ===
- Dahomey National Wildlife Refuge

== Demographics ==
Historical population
| Census | Pop. | Note | %± |
|---|---|---|---|
| 1840 | 1,356 | | — |
| 1850 | 2,577 | | 90.0% |
| 1860 | 10,471 | | 306.3% |
| 1870 | 9,732 | | −7.1% |
| 1880 | 18,652 | | 91.7% |
| 1890 | 29,980 | | 60.7% |
| 1900 | 35,427 | | 18.2% |
| 1910 | 48,905 | | 38.0% |
| 1920 | 57,669 | | 17.9% |
| 1930 | 71,051 | | 23.2% |
| 1940 | 67,564 | | −4.9% |
| 1950 | 63,004 | | −6.7% |
| 1960 | 54,464 | | −13.6% |
| 1970 | 49,409 | | −9.3% |
| 1980 | 45,965 | | −7.0% |
| 1990 | 41,875 | | −8.9% |
| 2000 | 40,633 | | −3.0% |
| 2010 | 34,145 | | −16.0% |
| 2020 | 30,985 | | −9.3% |
| 2025 (est.) | 28,262 | ▼ | −8.8% |
U.S. Decennial Census; 1790-1960 1900-1990; 1990-2000 2010-2013

=== 2020 census ===
Bolivar County, Mississippi – Racial and ethnic composition Note: the US Census treats Hispanic/Latino as an ethnic category. This table excludes Latinos from the racial categories and assigns them to a separate category. Hispanics/Latinos may be of any race.
| Race / Ethnicity (NH = Non-Hispanic) | Pop 1980 | Pop 1990 | Pop 2000 | Pop 2010 | Pop 2020 | % 1980 | % 1990 | % 2000 | % 2010 | % 2020 |
|---|---|---|---|---|---|---|---|---|---|---|
| White alone (NH) | 16,854 | 15,123 | 13,365 | 11,241 | 9,946 | 36.67% | 36.11% | 32.89% | 32.92% | 32.10% |
| Black or African American alone (NH) | 28,114 | 26,214 | 26,345 | 21,839 | 19,257 | 61.16% | 62.60% | 64.84% | 63.96% | 62.15% |
| Native American or Alaska Native alone (NH) | 26 | 25 | 39 | 38 | 22 | 0.06% | 0.06% | 0.10% | 0.11% | 0.07% |
| Asian alone (NH) | 165 | 136 | 199 | 186 | 262 | 0.36% | 0.32% | 0.49% | 0.54% | 0.85% |
| Native Hawaiian or Pacific Islander alone (NH) | x | x | 3 | 10 | 0 | x | x | 0.01% | 0.03% | 0.00% |
| Other race alone (NH) | 15 | 0 | 11 | 15 | 52 | 0.03% | 0.00% | 0.03% | 0.04% | 0.17% |
| Mixed race or Multiracial (NH) | x | x | 194 | 177 | 652 | x | x | 0.48% | 0.52% | 2.10% |
| Hispanic or Latino (any race) | 791 | 377 | 477 | 639 | 794 | 1.72% | 0.90% | 1.17% | 1.87% | 2.56% |
| Total | 45,965 | 41,875 | 40,633 | 34,145 | 30,985 | 100.00% | 100.00% | 100.00% | 100.00% | 100.00% |

=== 2020 census ===
As of the 2020 census, the county had a population of 30,985. The median age was 37.7 years. 23.6% of residents were under the age of 18 and 17.5% of residents were 65 years of age or older. For every 100 females there were 87.8 males, and for every 100 females age 18 and over there were 83.7 males age 18 and over.

The racial makeup of the county was 32.6% White, 62.5% Black or African American, 0.1% American Indian and Alaska Native, 0.8% Asian, <0.1% Native Hawaiian and Pacific Islander, 1.4% from some other race, and 2.6% from two or more races. Hispanic or Latino residents of any race comprised 2.6% of the population.

46.3% of residents lived in urban areas, while 53.7% lived in rural areas.

There were 11,994 households in the county, of which 31.5% had children under the age of 18 living in them. Of all households, 31.9% were married-couple households, 19.9% were households with a male householder and no spouse or partner present, and 42.9% were households with a female householder and no spouse or partner present. About 31.9% of all households were made up of individuals and 12.9% had someone living alone who was 65 years of age or older.

There were 13,628 housing units, of which 12.0% were vacant. Among occupied housing units, 56.7% were owner-occupied and 43.3% were renter-occupied. The homeowner vacancy rate was 1.3% and the rental vacancy rate was 10.7%.

=== 2010 census ===
As of the 2010 United States census, there were 34,145 people living in the county. 64.5% were Black or African American, 33.5% White, 0.6% Asian, 0.1% Native American, 0.9% of some other race and 0.6% of two or more races. 1.9% were Hispanic or Latino (of any race).

=== 2000 census ===
As of the census of 2000, there were 40,633 people, 13,776 households, and 9,725 families living in the county. The population density was 46 people per square mile (18/km^{2}). There were 14,939 housing units at an average density of [7] per square mile (7/km^{2}). The racial makeup of the county was 65.11% Black or African American, 33.24% White, 0.10% Native American, 0.49% Asian, 0.01% Pacific Islander, 0.48% from other races, and 0.56% from two or more races. 1.17% of the population were Hispanic or Latino of any race.

There were 13,776 households, out of which 35.20% had children under the age of 18 living with them, 38.20% were married couples living together, 27.30% had a female householder with no husband present, and 29.40% were non-families. 25.30% of all households were made up of individuals, and 9.90% had someone living alone who was 65 years of age or older. The average household size was 2.79 and the average family size was 3.36.

In the county, the population was spread out, with 29.60% under the age of 18, 14.00% from 18 to 24, 25.70% from 25 to 44, 19.60% from 45 to 64, and 11.00% who were 65 years of age or older. The median age was 30 years. For every 100 females there were 87.80 males. For every 100 females age 18 and over, there were 81.70 males.

The median income for a household in the county was $23,428, and the median income for a family was $27,301. Males had a median income of $27,643 versus $20,774 for females. The per capita income for the county was $12,088. About 27.90% of families and 33.30% of the population were below the poverty line, including 43.90% of those under age 18 and 27.90% of those age 65 or over.

== Life expectancy ==
According to the most recent data on U.S. life expectancy, published in 2010 by the Institute for Health Metrics and Evaluation, a male in Bolivar County could expect to live 65.0 years, the second shortest for any county in the United States, following McDowell County, West Virginia. The national average is 76.1 years for a male.

Senators Robert F. Kennedy and Joseph S. Clark, Jr. had visited "pockets of poverty" in the Mississippi Delta 40 years earlier. In Cleveland, they observed barefoot, underfed African-American children in tattered clothing, with vacant expressions and distended bellies. Kennedy stated that he thought he had seen the worst poverty in the nation in West Virginia, but it paled in comparison to the poverty he observed in Cleveland.

== Government ==
The county has a county administrator, who acts upon the requests of the board of supervisors primarily.

== Education ==
=== Colleges and universities ===
- Delta State University (Cleveland)

The county is within the boundaries of two community college districts: Coahoma Community College and Mississippi Delta Community College. CCC's main campus is in rural Coahoma County outside of Clarksdale, and MDCC's campus is in Moorhead in Sunflower County.

=== Public School Districts ===
School districts:

- Cleveland School District (Cleveland)
- North Bolivar Consolidated School District (Mound Bayou; previously in Shelby)
- West Bolivar Consolidated School District (Rosedale, Shaw, and Benoit)

Former school districts:

- Benoit School District (Benoit)
- Mound Bayou School District (Mound Bayou)
- Shaw School District (Shaw)

The five school districts other than the Cleveland School District, were, in 2012, among the 20 smallest of the 152 school districts in the State of Mississippi. In the State of Mississippi, Bolivar County was the only county that had six school districts. Consolidation was urged to save money and facilitate cooperation. In 2012 the Mississippi Senate Education Committee passed a bill asking the State of Mississippi to consolidate the six school districts in Bolivar County to three or two. The Mississippi Senate passed the bill 37–11.

As recently as the 1960s the school board of Bolivar County censored what black children were allowed to learn, and mandated that "Neither foreign languages nor civics shall be taught in Negro schools. Nor shall American history from 1860 to 1875 be taught.”

=== Private School ===
- Bayou Academy (Cleveland)

== Media ==
The Bolivar Commercial was distributed in Bolivar County.

== Politics ==
Bolivar County, like most other Mississippi Delta counties, is a Democratic stronghold. The last Republican to carry the county was Richard Nixon in 1972.

United States presidential election results for Bolivar County, Mississippi
| Year | Republican | | Democratic | | Third party(ies) | |
| Year | No. | % | No. | % | No. | % |
|---|---|---|---|---|---|---|
| 1912 | 10 | 2.81% | 324 | 91.01% | 22 | 6.18% |
| 1920 | 326 | 23.80% | 1,039 | 75.84% | 5 | 0.36% |
| 1924 | 266 | 16.90% | 1,212 | 77.00% | 96 | 6.10% |
| 1928 | 266 | 12.06% | 1,939 | 87.94% | 0 | 0.00% |
| 1932 | 204 | 9.48% | 1,941 | 90.24% | 6 | 0.28% |
| 1936 | 101 | 4.21% | 2,296 | 95.79% | 0 | 0.00% |
| 1940 | 234 | 7.29% | 2,974 | 92.68% | 1 | 0.03% |
| 1944 | 378 | 13.39% | 2,444 | 86.61% | 0 | 0.00% |
| 1948 | 115 | 3.95% | 219 | 7.52% | 2,580 | 88.54% |
| 1952 | 2,096 | 53.21% | 1,843 | 46.79% | 0 | 0.00% |
| 1956 | 754 | 21.48% | 1,176 | 33.49% | 1,581 | 45.03% |
| 1960 | 1,012 | 26.85% | 1,119 | 29.69% | 1,638 | 43.46% |
| 1964 | 4,680 | 86.49% | 731 | 13.51% | 0 | 0.00% |
| 1968 | 1,790 | 15.56% | 4,696 | 40.82% | 5,018 | 43.62% |
| 1972 | 7,397 | 66.12% | 3,616 | 32.32% | 174 | 1.56% |
| 1976 | 5,136 | 39.89% | 7,561 | 58.73% | 178 | 1.38% |
| 1980 | 5,148 | 35.53% | 8,839 | 61.00% | 504 | 3.48% |
| 1984 | 6,939 | 43.85% | 8,769 | 55.42% | 116 | 0.73% |
| 1988 | 6,105 | 43.34% | 7,606 | 54.00% | 374 | 2.66% |
| 1992 | 4,752 | 33.40% | 8,801 | 61.87% | 673 | 4.73% |
| 1996 | 4,027 | 30.56% | 8,670 | 65.80% | 479 | 3.64% |
| 2000 | 4,847 | 35.80% | 8,436 | 62.31% | 255 | 1.88% |
| 2004 | 5,535 | 36.16% | 9,631 | 62.92% | 141 | 0.92% |
| 2008 | 4,891 | 31.80% | 10,334 | 67.19% | 156 | 1.01% |
| 2012 | 4,701 | 30.47% | 10,582 | 68.59% | 145 | 0.94% |
| 2016 | 4,590 | 33.20% | 9,046 | 65.44% | 188 | 1.36% |
| 2020 | 4,671 | 33.99% | 8,904 | 64.78% | 169 | 1.23% |
| 2024 | 3,943 | 37.79% | 6,419 | 61.51% | 73 | 0.70% |

== Communities ==
=== Cities ===
- Cleveland (county seat)
- Rosedale (county seat)
- Mound Bayou
- Shaw (small portion in Sunflower County)
- Shelby

=== Towns ===
- Alligator
- Benoit
- Beulah
- Boyle
- Duncan
- Gunnison
- Merigold
- Pace
- Renova
- Winstonville

=== Census-designated places ===
- Bolivar
- Scott
- Skene
- Symonds

=== Unincorporated places ===
- Choctaw
- Christmas
- Dahomy
- Deeson
- Hushpuckena
- Lamont
- Litton
- Malvina
- O'Reilly
- Perthshire
- Round Lake
- Stringtown
- Waxhaw
- Wright
- Zumbro

=== Ghost towns ===
- Australia
- Concordia
- Eutaw
- Huntington
- Mound Landing
- Prentiss
- Riverton
- Victoria

== Notable people ==
- Mary Booze
- Charles Capps
- Charles Clark (governor)
- Charles Clark (judge)
- Medgar Evers, civil rights activist
- T.R.M. Howard
- Amzie Moore
- Peter B. Starke, state representative and state senator, Confederate general in the Civil War
- Henry Townsend, blues musician

== See also ==
- National Register of Historic Places listings in Bolivar County, Mississippi
- Delta and Providence Cooperative Farms
