= Mississippi Highway 149 =

Highway in Mississippi

Mississippi Highway 149

Route information
- Maintained by MDOT
- Length: 58.073 mi (93.459 km) Total of eight sections; 57.081 miles (91.863 km) excluding concurrencies
- Existed: 2006–present

Location
- Country: United States
- State: Mississippi
- Counties: Stone, Covington, Simpson, Rankin, Yazoo, Humphreys, Sunflower, Coahoma

Highway system
- Mississippi State Highway System; Interstate; US; State
| ← MS 145 | → MS 161 |

Mississippi Highway 149 (MS 149) is a state highway in Mississippi. The route designation is given to six former segments of U.S. Route 49 (US 49), and two former sections of US 49W, within the state that have been bypassed. The sections run through Wiggins, Mount Olive, between Magee and Sanatorium, between Mendenhall and Braxton, in Richland, Mississippi, between Yazoo City and Silver City, Inverness, and Clarksdale. The total length of the eight sections of MS 149 is 58.073 miles (93.459 km).

== Route description ==
MS 149 begins at an intersection with US 49 south of Wiggins in Stone County, heading north along two-lane undivided South Magnolia Drive. The road passes through a mix of woodland and industrial and business areas. Farther north, the highway comes to an interchange with MS 26, at which point MS 149 becomes concurrent with MS 29. The two highways continue north and pass businesses as a three-lane road with a center left-turn lane a short distance to the west of Kansas City Southern Railway's Gulfport Branch line. The name of the road changes to North Magnolia Drive at the College Avenue intersection. MS 29 splits from MS 149 by heading east while MS 149 curves northwest along with the railroad tracks and passes through wooded residential and commercial areas as a two-lane road. The tracks head further from the road as it continues through woods and development before MS 149 passes to the west of industry and comes to its northern end at another intersection with US 49 north of Wiggins.

MS 149 begins at an intersection with US 49 south of Mount Olive in Covington County, heading north-northwest on two-lane undivided South Main Street. The road runs through woodland with some homes and enters Mount Olive, where it comes to an intersection with MS 35. The highway runs northwest through wooded neighborhoods before it passes businesses and parallels Canadian National Railway's Beaumont Subdivision line along Main Street. MS 149 turns west-northwest away from the tracks and gains median parking spaces as it runs through the downtown area of Mount Olive. Past downtown, the road becomes a two-lane divided highway as it heads past homes. MS 149 leaves Mount Olive and heads northwest on two-lane undivided Old Highway 49 North through wooded areas with some fields and homes, ending at another intersection with US 49.

MS 149 begins at a junction with US 49 south of Magee in Simpson County, heading north-northwest as a two-lane undivided Simpson Highway 149. The road passes through wooded areas with some homes before it enters Magee. The highway intersects MS 28 in an areas of businesses, with that route turning north for a concurrency with MS 149. The two highways head north and pass under Canadian National Railway's Beaumont Subdivision line before MS 28 splits to the east. MS 149 turns northwest and runs through commercial areas parallel to the railroad tracks, passing to the south of Magee General Hospital. The road forms a one-block concurrency with MS 541 south of the downtown area. MS 149 runs past more businesses before it curves to the west-northwest and runs through residential areas. The highway leaves Magee and continues west through rural areas of homes before it reaches an interchange with US 49 and crosses MS 545 a short distance later. MS 149 heads northwest through wooded areas with some homes, passing to the northeast of the Boswell Regional Center mental hospital in the community of Sanatorium. The highway continues northwest through forests and reaches its northern terminus at an intersection with US 49.

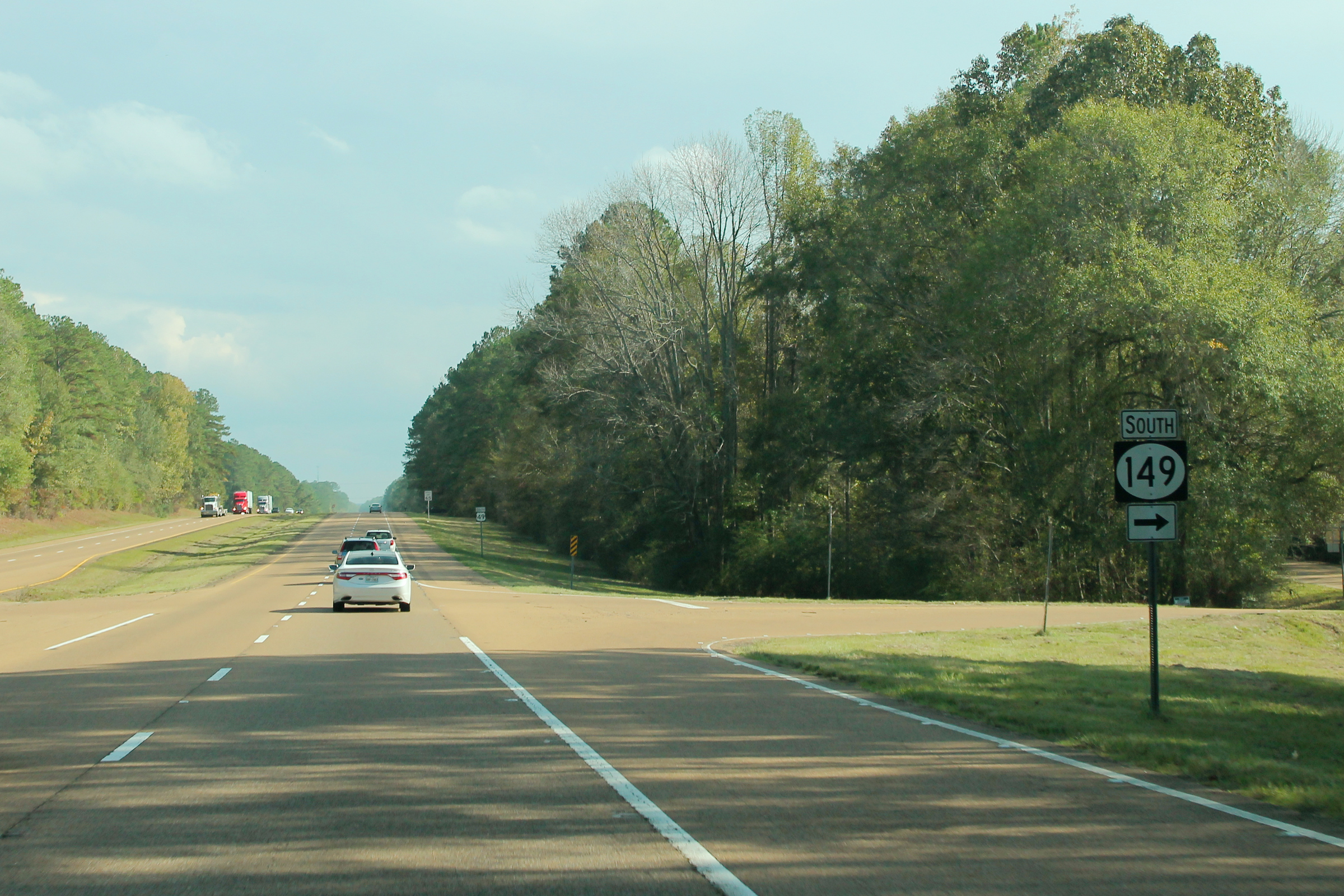
Northern terminus of this segment of MS 149 at US 49 near Braxton

MS 149 begins at a junction with US 49 southeast of Mendenhall in Simpson County, heading northwest on two-lane undivided Simpson Highway 149. The road passes through wooded areas and intersects the western terminus of the eastern segment of MS 540. The highway continues west through forests before it enters Mendenhall and passes through residential and commercial areas a short distance to the north of Canadian National Railway's Beaumont Subdivision line. MS 149 passes to the south of the downtown area and continues past more development, curving northwest. The road comes to an interchange with MS 13 before it leaves Mendenhall and runs through forests. The highway crosses the Strong River before it enters D'Lo. Here, MS 149 turns north and passes homes and businesses, intersecting the eastern terminus of the western segment of MS 540. The road passes through residential areas and curves northwest, leaving D'Lo and heading through wooded areas with occasional homes. The highway continues through rural areas before it passes to the northeast of the wooded residential village of Braxton. MS 149 continues northwest through forested areas before it ends at another intersection with US 49.

MS 149 begins at an intersection with US 49 within the city of Richland. It first heads north-northwest along a two-land road passing through an industrial park. After going through a wooded area, the road curves to the north-northeast passing through more industrial parks. After it passes under Interstate 20 (I-20) and its interchange ramps for exits 46 and 47A, the road becomes a divided highway (though still one lane in each direction). The road curves to the northwest before ending at a signalized intersection with US 80.

For its entire length, the highway is unsigned and is only known by Old Highway 49. This segment of MS 149 is not maintained by the state.

MS 149 begins at an intersection with US 49 and MS 16 in Yazoo City, Yazoo County, heading west concurrent with MS 16 on East Broadway Street, a three-lane road with a center left-turn lane. The road heads through wooded areas with some homes and businesses, narrowing to two lanes and continuing west-northwest. The highway becomes lined with homes before it reaches the commercial downtown of Yazoo City, where the name changes to West Broadway Street at the Main Street intersection. MS 16/MS 149 heads out of the downtown area and crosses Canadian National Railway's Yazoo Subdivision line at-grade adjacent to the Yazoo City station serving Amtrak's City of New Orleans train. The road runs past homes and businesses before it reaches an interchange with MS 3 at the western edge of Yazoo City. Past this interchange, the highway becomes unnumbered and crosses the Yazoo River before heading through a mix of farmland and woodland. MS 16/MS 149 crosses Broad Lake and continues through rural land, turning northwest and entering Humphreys County.

MS 16 splits from MS 149 by turning west, while MS 149 curves north and heads through agricultural areas. The road passes to the east of the residential town of Louise before it comes to an intersection with the eastern terminus of the western segment of MS 14. The highway continues north through farmland before it bends east to bypass the residential community of Midnight, with Old U.S. Highway 49W passing through Midnight. From here, MS 149 continues northeast through more rural areas before it comes to its northern terminus at an intersection with US 49W (unsigned MS 3) in Silver City.

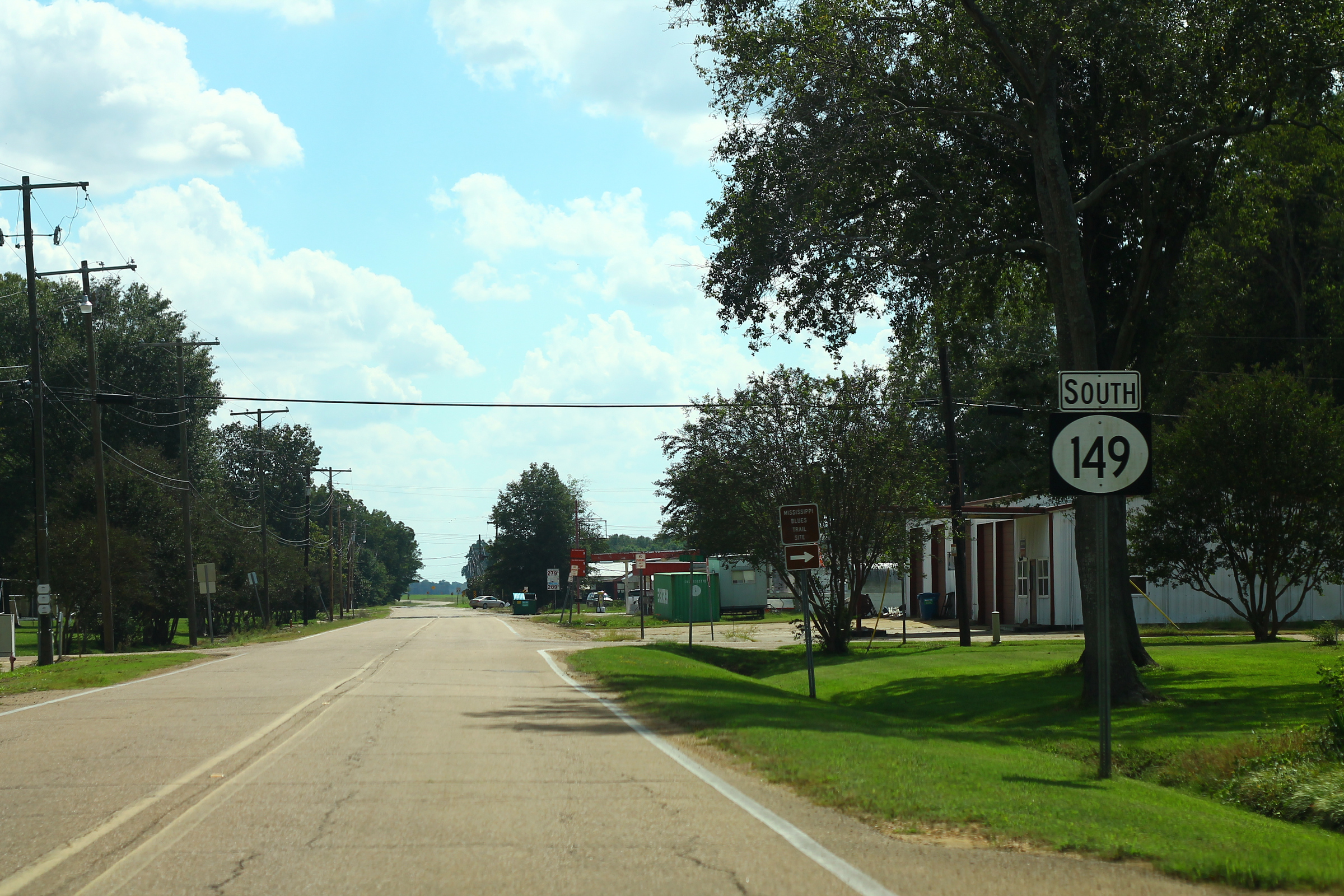
MS 149 in Inverness

MS 149 runs for 1.3 miles (2.1 km) in the town of Inverness in Sunflower County, Mississippi.

MS 149 begins at an intersection with US 49W/MS 3 at the southern edge of town. It heads north through neighborhoods to pass just east of downtown, where it has an intersection where unsigned MS 816 (Third Street). The highway continues north to pass through more rural areas before coming to an end at another intersection with US 49W/MS 3. The entire route of MS 149 in Inverness is a two-lane highway.

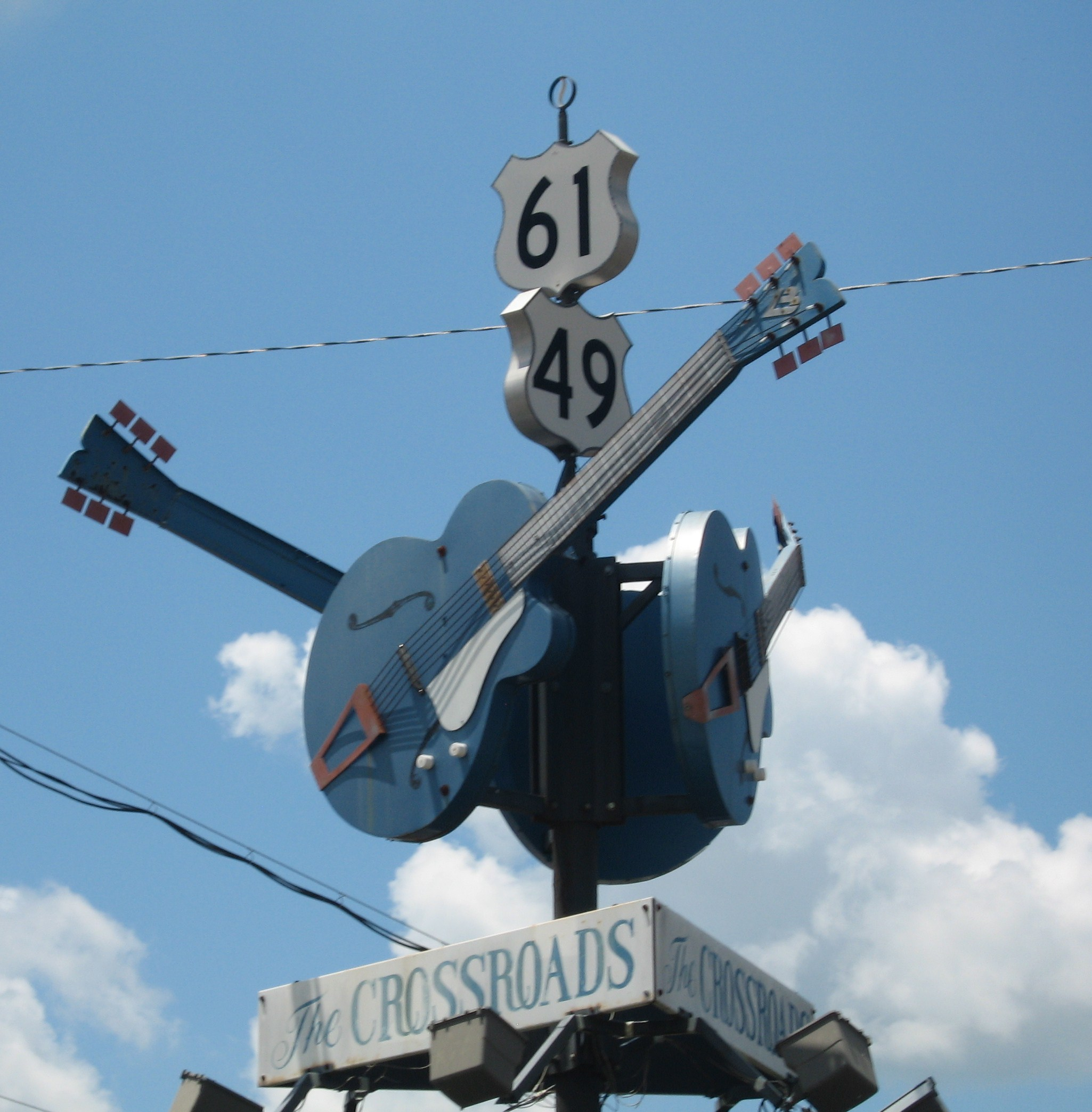
Monument for Cross Road Blues at the northern terminus of MS 149

MS 149 in Clarksdale is known as Desoto Avenue for its entire length. It begins at an interchange with US 49, US 61, US 278 and MS 322 southeast of the downtown. Within the interchange, the highway is a divided four-lane highway, however it narrows to a two-lane undivided road north of there. Heading northwest past various light industrial and agricultural buildings, the road ends at MS 161 which is also the site of a monument dedicated to the Robert Johnson song Cross Road Blues.

== Major intersections ==
| County | Location | mi | km | Destinations | Notes |
|---|---|---|---|---|---|
| Stone | Wiggins | 0.000 | 0.000 | US 49 (South Azalea Drive) | Southern terminus |
| Stone | Wiggins | 0.927– 1.140 | 1.492– 1.835 | MS 26 to US 49 – Lucedale, Poplarville MS 29 begins | Interchange, south end of MS 29 overlap |
| Stone | Wiggins | 1.707 | 2.747 | MS 29 north (East Hatten Avenue) – Flint Creek Water Park | North end of MS 29 overlap |
| Stone | Wiggins | 3.870 | 6.228 | US 49 (North Azalea Drive) | |
Gap in route
| Covington | Mount Olive | | | US 49 – Jackson, Hattiesburg | |
| Covington | Mount Olive | | | MS 35 – Mize, Bassfield | |
| Covington | Mount Olive | | | US 49 – Jackson, Hattiesburg | |
Gap in route
| Simpson | Magee | | | US 49 – Jackson, Hattiesburg | |
| Simpson | Magee | | | MS 28 west (Pinola Drive) – Jackson, Hazelhurst | South end of MS 28 overlap |
| Simpson | Magee | | | MS 28 east (Laurel Drive) – Laurel | North end of MS 28 overlap |
| Simpson | Magee | | | MS 541 north (1st Avenue NE) | South end of MS 541 overlap |
| Simpson | Magee | | | MS 541 south (Main Avenue South) | North end of MS 541 overlap |
| Simpson | Magee | 3.311– 3.366 | 5.329– 5.417 | US 49 – Jackson, Hattiesburg | Interchange |
| Simpson | Magee | | | MS 545 south | Northern terminus of MS 545 |
| Simpson | Sanatorium | | | US 49 – Hattiesburg, Jackson | |
| Simpson | Gap in route | | | | |
| Simpson | Mendenhall | | | US 49 – Jackson, Hattiesburg | |
| Simpson | Mendenhall | | | MS 540 east | Southern end of unsigned MS 540 concurrency |
| Simpson | Mendenhall | 2.332– 2.476 | 3.753– 3.985 | MS 13 to US 49 – Puckett, Prentiss | Interchange |
| Simpson | D'Lo | | | MS 540 west (Jupiter Road) | Northern end of unsigned MS 540 concurrency |
| Simpson | Braxton | | | US 49 – Jackson, Hattiesburg | |
Gap in route
| Rankin | Richland | 0.000– 0.125 | 0.000– 0.201 | US 49 | |
| Rankin | Richland | | | US 80 | |
Gap in route
| Yazoo | Yazoo City | | | US 49 / MS 16 east – Greenwood, Indianola, Jackson | Eastern end of MS 16 overlap |
| Yazoo | Yazoo City | 2.567– 2.718 | 4.131– 4.374 | MS 3 to US 49W – Moorhead, Indianola, Vicksburg, Trucks to US 49 / US 49E | Interchange |
| Humphreys | | | | MS 16 west – Holly Bluff | West end of MS 16 overlap |
| Humphreys | Louise | | | MS 14 west – Anguilla | Eastern terminus of western segment of MS 14 |
| Humphreys | Silver City | | | US 49W (MS 3) – Belzoni, Yazoo City | |
Gap in route
| Sunflower | Inverness | | | US 49W / MS 3 – Belzoni, Isola, Moorhead, Indianola | |
| Sunflower | Inverness | | | Third Street (MS 816 west) - Downtown | Eastern terminus of unsigned MS 816 |
| Sunflower | Inverness | | | US 49W / MS 3 – Belzoni, Isola, Moorhead, Indianola | |
Gap in route
| Coahoma | Clarksdale | | | US 49 / US 61 / US 278 / MS 322 – Memphis, Cleveland, Greenville | |
| Coahoma | Clarksdale | | | MS 161 (State Street) / Desoto Avenue – Downtown Clarksdale | Northern terminus |
1.000 mi = 1.609 km; 1.000 km = 0.621 mi

== See also ==
- Arkansas Highway 349
