= U.S. Route 49W =

U.S. Highway in Mississippi

U.S. Highway 49W

Route information
- Maintained by MDOT
- Length: 89.3 mi (143.7 km) (81.894 mi according to state mileage)
- Existed: 1932–present

Major junctions
- South end: US 49 / US 49E in Yazoo City
- MS 3 in Yazoo City; MS 149 in Silver City; MS 7 / MS 12 in Belzoni; US 82 in Indianola; MS 8 in Ruleville; MS 32 in Parchman
- North end: US 49 / US 49E / MS 3 in Tutwiler

Location
- Country: United States
- State: Mississippi
- Counties: Yazoo, Humphreys, Sunflower, Coahoma, Tallahatchie

Highway system
- United States Numbered Highway System; List; Special; Divided; Mississippi State Highway System; Interstate; US; State
← US 49E	→ MS 50

U.S. Route 49W (US 49W) is an 89.3-mile-long (143.7 km) U.S. Highway in the Delta region of Mississippi, passing through Yazoo, Humphreys, Sunflower, and Tallahatchie counties.

== Route description ==
US 49W begins just north of downtown Yazoo City at an interchange between US 49 and US 49E. It heads northwest to have an interchange with and become concurrent with MS 3 before leaving Yazoo City and crossing over the Yazoo River. The highway then crosses into Humphreys County just southwest of Carter.

US 49W/MS 3 now cross over the Will M. Whittington Auxiliary Channel and Lake Atchaflya before passing through Silver City and having an intersection with MS 149. The highway continues north, paralleling the Yazoo River, to pass through Belzoni, where it bypasses downtown along its west side and has a short concurrency with MS 12 and an intersection with MS 7. US 49W/MS 3 continue northwest to pass through Isola, where it has an intersection with unsigned MS 806 (Belzoni Street) and crosses over Lake Dawson, before entering Sunflower County.

The highway passes through Caile and Inverness, where it intersects another section of MS 149, before MS 3 splits off towards Moorhead near Baird. US 49W crosses over the Sunflower River to enter Indianola. It bypasses downtown along its east side, passing through neighborhoods to have an intersection with US 82. The highway then narrows to two-lanes to leave Indianola and cross the Sunflower River for a second time. Prior to this point, the entire route of US 49W is a four-lane highway. US 49W passes through Sunflower, where it intersects unsigned MS 810 and rejoins MS 3, before passing through Dwyer and Blaine. US 49W/MS 3 passes through Doddsville, where it has a short concurrency with MS 442 and intersects unsigned MS 832, and Cottondale before passing through Ruleville, where it has an intersection with unsigned MS 812 and MS 8. The highway passes through Drew, where it intersects unsigned MS 820, before passing by the Mississippi State Penitentiary, where it has an intersection with MS 32. US 49W/MS 3 passes through Rome before cutting a corner of Coahoma County. Soon after, the route reaches Tallahatchie County.

The highway passes northeast through rural areas for several miles before entering Tutwiler and coming to an end at a Y-Intersection between US 49 and US 49E, with MS 3 continuing north along US 49.

== History ==
U.S. Route 49W didn't come about until 1932, when the US 49 split was made. The southern section of this route was designated for 4-laning under the 1987 Highway Program, and was also marked as NHS.

The highway previously traveled straight through downtown Yazoo City along what is now MS 149/MS 16 (Broadway Street). No trucks were allowed along this portion of the highway, with trucks forced to detour via routes on the edge of the city. In 2004, a completely new four-lane alignment between Yazoo City and Silver City opened. This had the effect of lengthening US 49, shortening US 49W, and allowing trucks to follow US 49W without detouring around the middle of Yazoo City. The former two-lane alignment of US 49W between Yazoo City and Silver City became part of MS 149 in 2006.

It is notable that for several years during the 1930s, a second split route existed on US 49 in South Mississippi, similar to but shorter than the split that still exists in the Delta region. Between Brooklyn and Hattiesburg, travelers had the option of a 24-mile-long (39 km) direct route via US 49W, or a somewhat shorter but broken route on US 49E, serving the Forrest County Agricultural High School and the small community of McLaurin, Mississippi.

== Major intersections ==
County	Location	mi	km	Destinations	Notes
Yazoo	Yazoo City	0.0	0.0	US 49 south / US 49E north – Jackson, Greenwood	Interchange; US 49 splits into US 49W and US 49E
Yazoo	Yazoo City	0.97– 1.6	1.56– 2.6	MS 3 south – Yazoo City, Vicksburg	Interchange; south end of MS 3 overlap
Humphreys	Silver City	17.3	27.8	MS 149 south to MS 14 / MS 16 – Midnight, Louise	Northern terminus of Yazoo City-Silver City section of MS 149
Humphreys	Belzoni	23.1	37.2	MS 12 east	South end of MS 12 overlap
Humphreys	Belzoni	23.8	38.3	MS 7 north / MS 12 west (1st Street) – Indianola, Hollandale	North end of MS 12 overlap; southern terminus of MS 7
Humphreys	Isola	31.1	50.1	S Belzoni Street (MS 806 north) – Downtown	Southern terminus of unsigned MS 806
Humphreys	Isola	32.0	51.5	N Belzoni Street (MS 806 south) – Downtown	Northern terminus of unsigned MS 806
Sunflower	Inverness	37.5	60.4	MS 149 north (Old Highway 49W) – Downtown	Southern terminus of Inverness section of MS 149
Sunflower	Inverness	38.9	62.6	MS 149 south (Old Highway 49W) – Downtown	Northern terminus of Inverness section of MS 149
Sunflower		40.0	64.4	MS 3 north – Moorhead, Mississippi Delta Community College	North end of MS 3 overlap
Sunflower	Indianola	46.5	74.8	US 82 – Greenville, Greenwood	
Sunflower	Sunflower	54.6	87.9	MS 3 south – Moorhead, Mississippi Delta Community College	South end of MS 3 overlap
Sunflower	Sunflower	55.1	88.7	Quiver Street (MS 810 west) – Downtown	Eastern terminus of unsigned MS 810
Sunflower	Doddsville	62.9	101.2	MS 442 west – Shaw	South end of MS 442 overlap
Sunflower	Doddsville	63.1	101.5	MS 442 east – Schlater; 5th Avenue (MS 832 west) – Downtown	North end of MS 442 overlap; eastern terminus of unsigned MS 832
Sunflower	Ruleville	67.5	108.6	Sunflower Street (MS 812 north) – Downtown	Southern terminus of unsigned MS 812
Sunflower	Ruleville	68.6	110.4	MS 8 (Quiver Street) – Cleveland, Minter City	
Sunflower	Drew	74.3	119.6	Park Avenue (MS 820 west) – Downtown	Eastern terminus of unsigned MS 820
Sunflower	Parchman	81.8	131.6	MS 32 east – Webb	Western terminus of eastern segment MS 32
Coahoma	No major junctions				
Tallahatchie	Tutwiler	89.3	143.7	US 49 north (MS 3 north) / US 49E south – Clarksdale, Greenwood	North end of MS 3 overlap; US 49W and US 49E merge to form US 49
1.000 mi = 1.609 km; 1.000 km = 0.621 mi: Concurrency terminus
