= James D. Montgomery =

James D. Montgomery may refer to:

- James D. Montgomery (attorney) (born 1932), African-American civil rights attorney in Chicago and Trustee of the University of Illinois
- James D. Montgomery (economist) (born 1963), labor market economist at the University of Madison, Wisconsin
