= Blaine, Mississippi =

- Unincorporated community
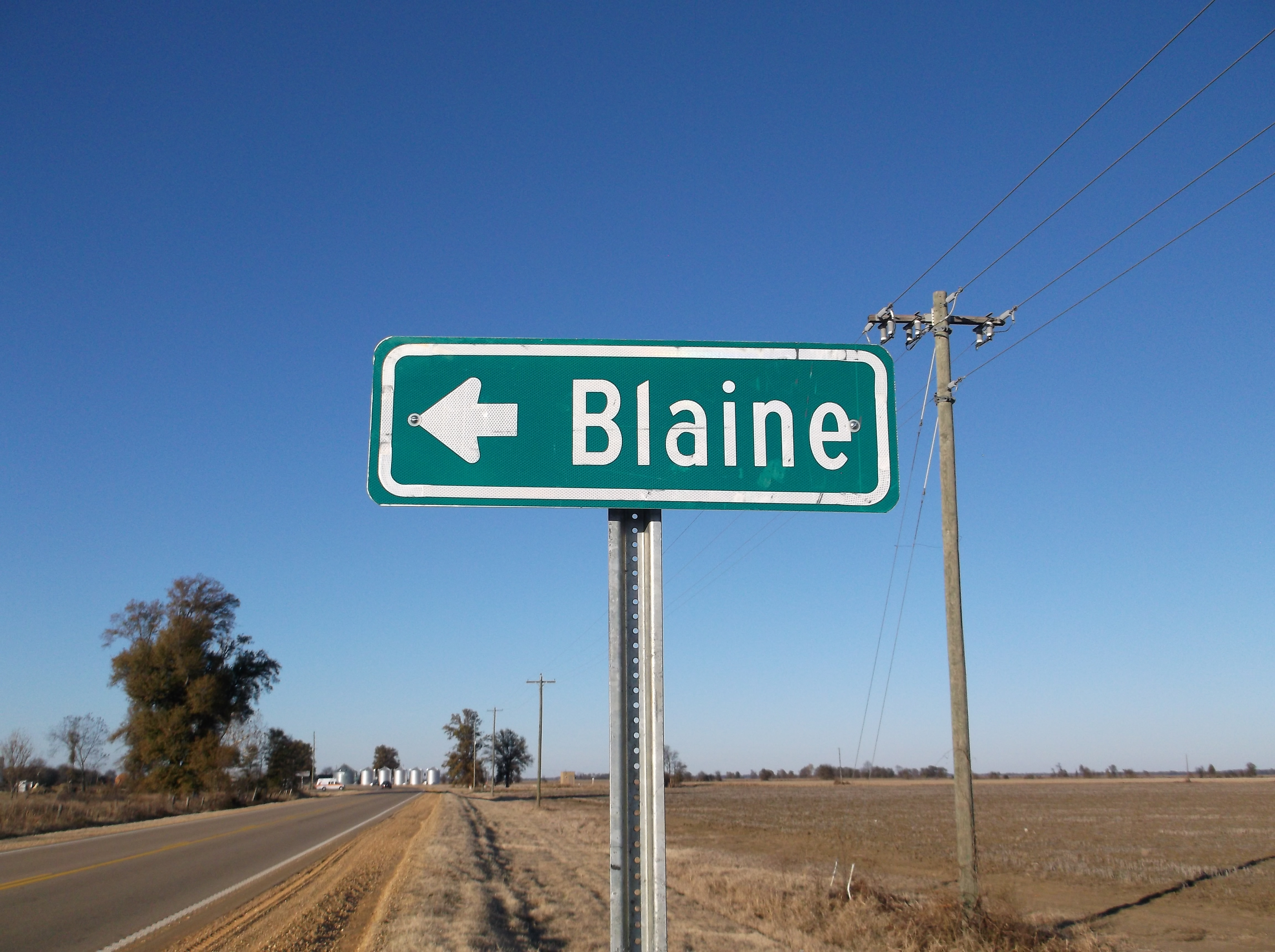
- Highway sign outside of Blaine

- Location within Mississippi Location within the United States
- Coordinates: 33°36′28″N 90°31′21″W
- Country: United States
- State: Mississippi
- County: Sunflower
- Elevation: 125 ft (38 m)
- Time zone: UTC-6 (Central (CST))
  - Summer (DST): UTC-5 (CDT)
- ZIP code: 38778
- Area code: 662
- GNIS feature ID: 667259

Blaine is an unincorporated community located in central Sunflower County, Mississippi. Blaine is approximately 5 miles (8.0 km) north of Sunflower and 3 miles (4.8 km) south of Doddsville along U.S. Route 49W.

== Gallery ==
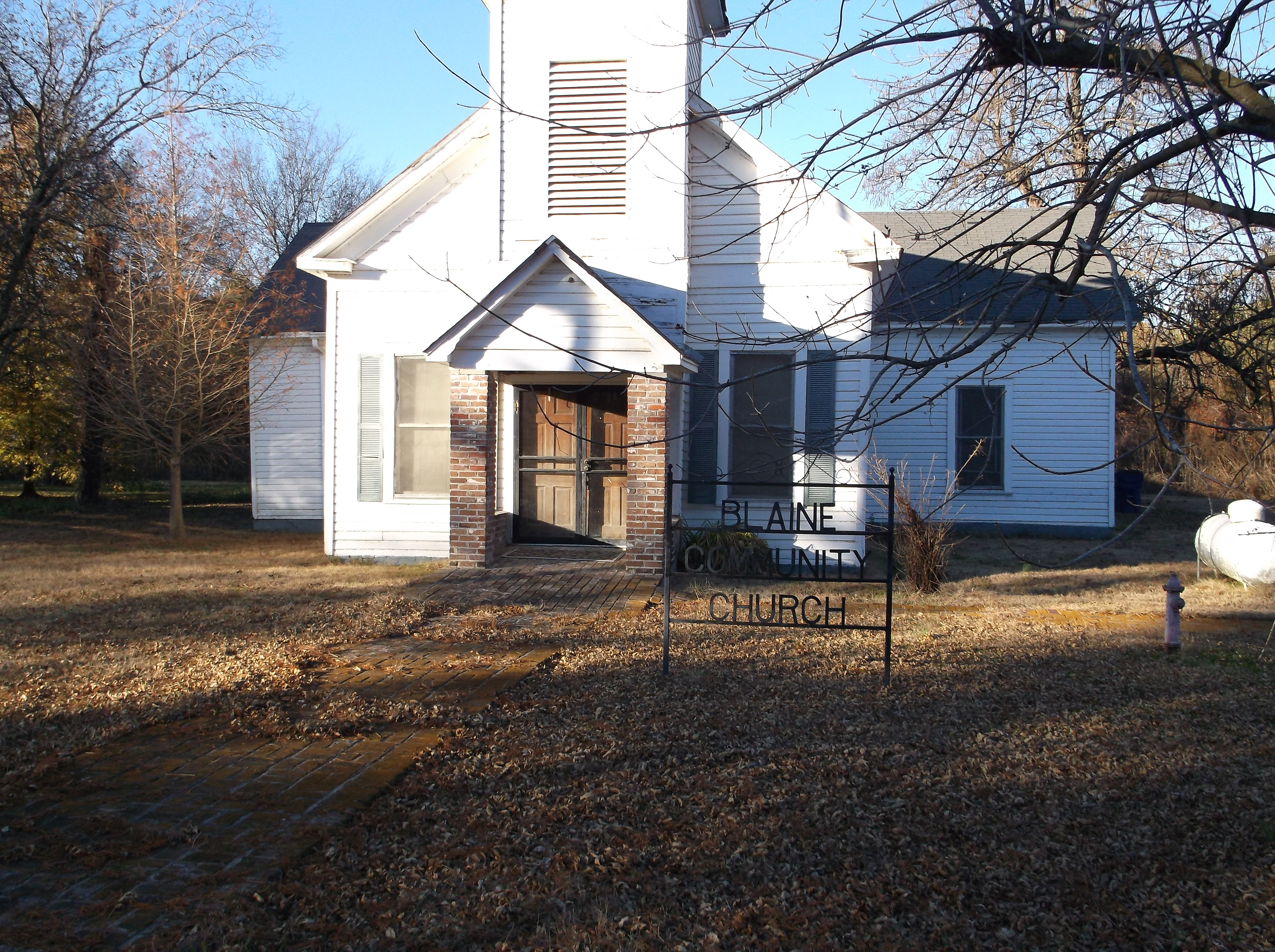
Blaine Community Church (on Bush Holeman Road)

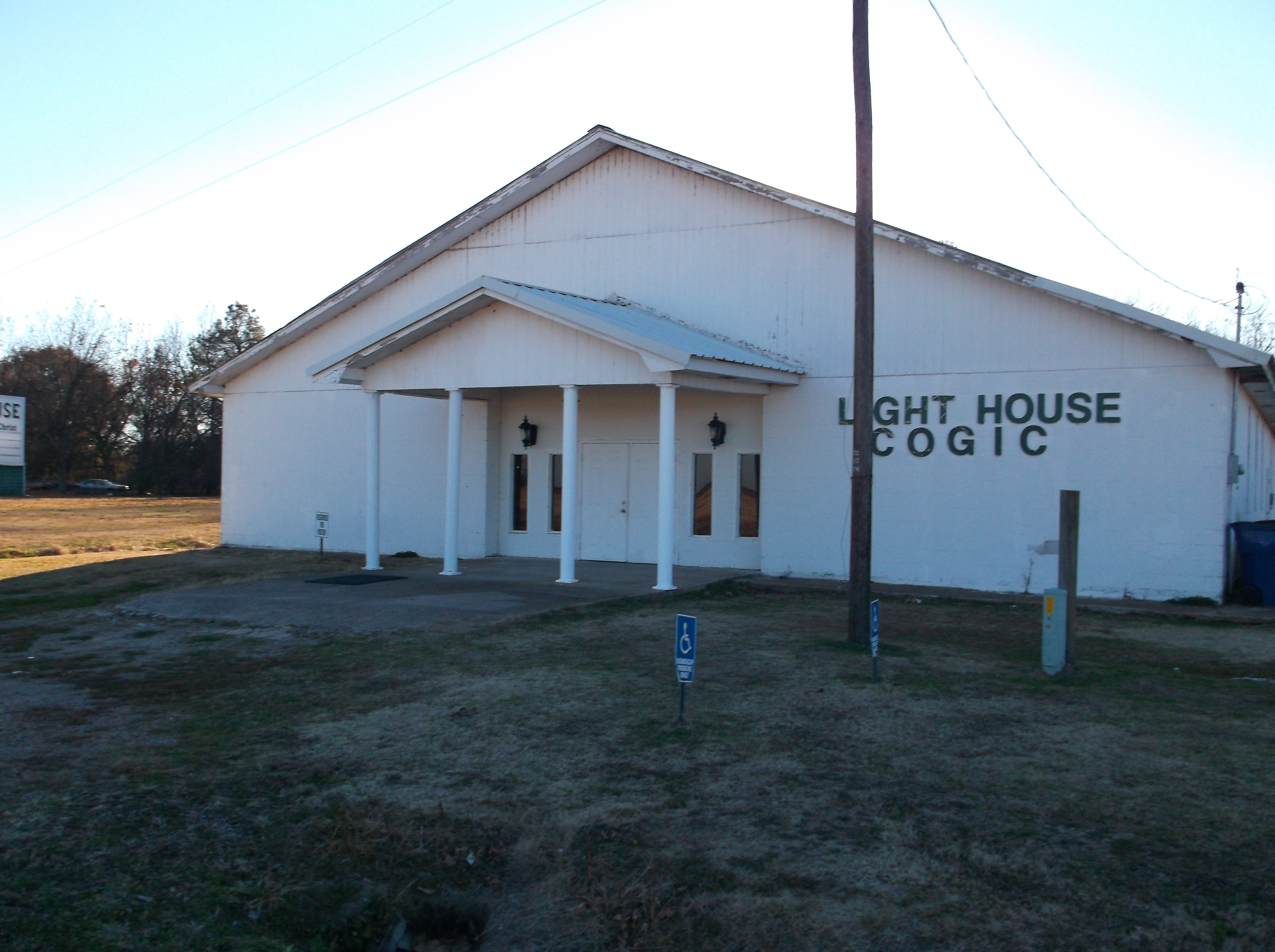
Lighthouse C.O.G.I.C. (on Bush Holeman Road)

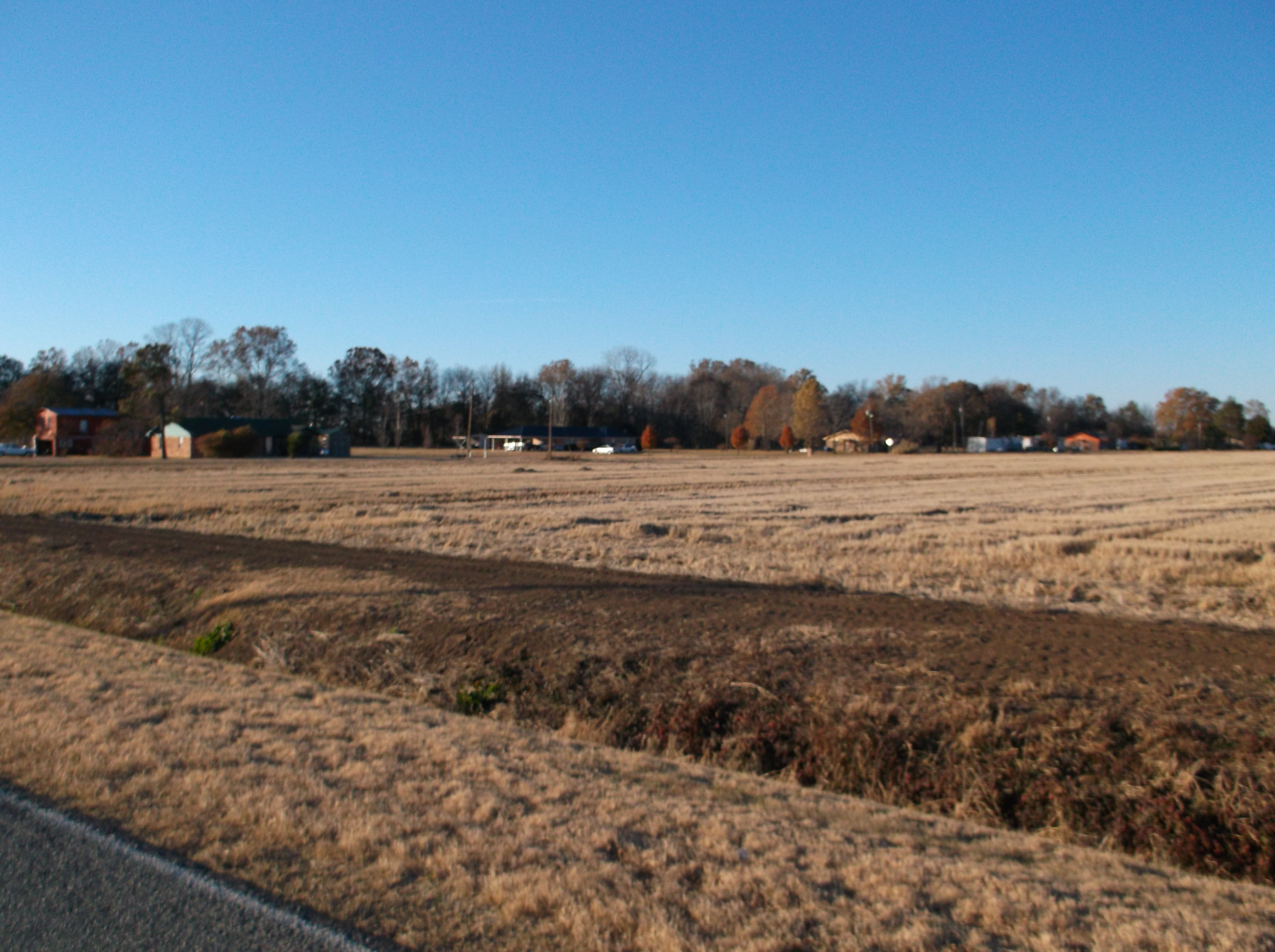
Homes in the community along the Sunflower River
