= Mississippi Highway 161 =

Highway in Mississippi

Mississippi Highway 161
- Various sections of MS 161 highlighted

Route information
- Maintained by MDOT

Location
- Country: United States
- State: Mississippi
- Counties: Bolivar, Coahoma, Desoto

Highway system
- Mississippi State Highway System; Interstate; US; State
← MS 149	→ MS 172

Mississippi Highway 161 (MS 161) is a state highway designation for three highways in the U.S. state of Mississippi, consisting of old alignments of U.S. Route 61 (US 61). Totaling at 19.872 miles (31.981 km), the three sections are located in Bolivar, Coahoma, and Desoto counties. The Bolivar County section, designated in 2000, travels from Merigold to Mound Bayou and Shelby. In Coahoma County, MS 161 was designated in 2004 and runs through Clarksdale and Lyon. In Desoto County, MS 161 travels through the town of Walls and was created in 1999.

== Merigold–Shelby ==
Mississippi Highway 161
- Location: Merigold–Shelby
- Length: 10.866 mi (17.487 km)
- Existed: 2000–present

MS 161 starts at US 61 and US 278, south of the town of Merigold. After intersecting Merigold–Drew Road, the road travels north into the town, where it is known as Second Street. The route crosses over the Jones Bayou past South Street and intersects several streets inside Merigold before exiting city limits near Lee Street. It passes through a small tract of farmland and intersects South Lane Road. About one mile (1.6 km) later, MS 161 intersects Ford Road and enters the city limits of Mound Bayou. Inside the city, the road (now known as Edwards Avenue) is the boundary of the Mound Bayou Historical District from South Street to Martin Luther King Jr. Street. The Taborian Hospital is also located on the route, outside the historic district. MS 161 also passes by the John F. Kennedy Memorial High School and crosses the waterway known as Mound Bayou near Lampard Street. The route leaves the city near Mohawk Street, and it crosses northwesterly over US 61 and US 278.

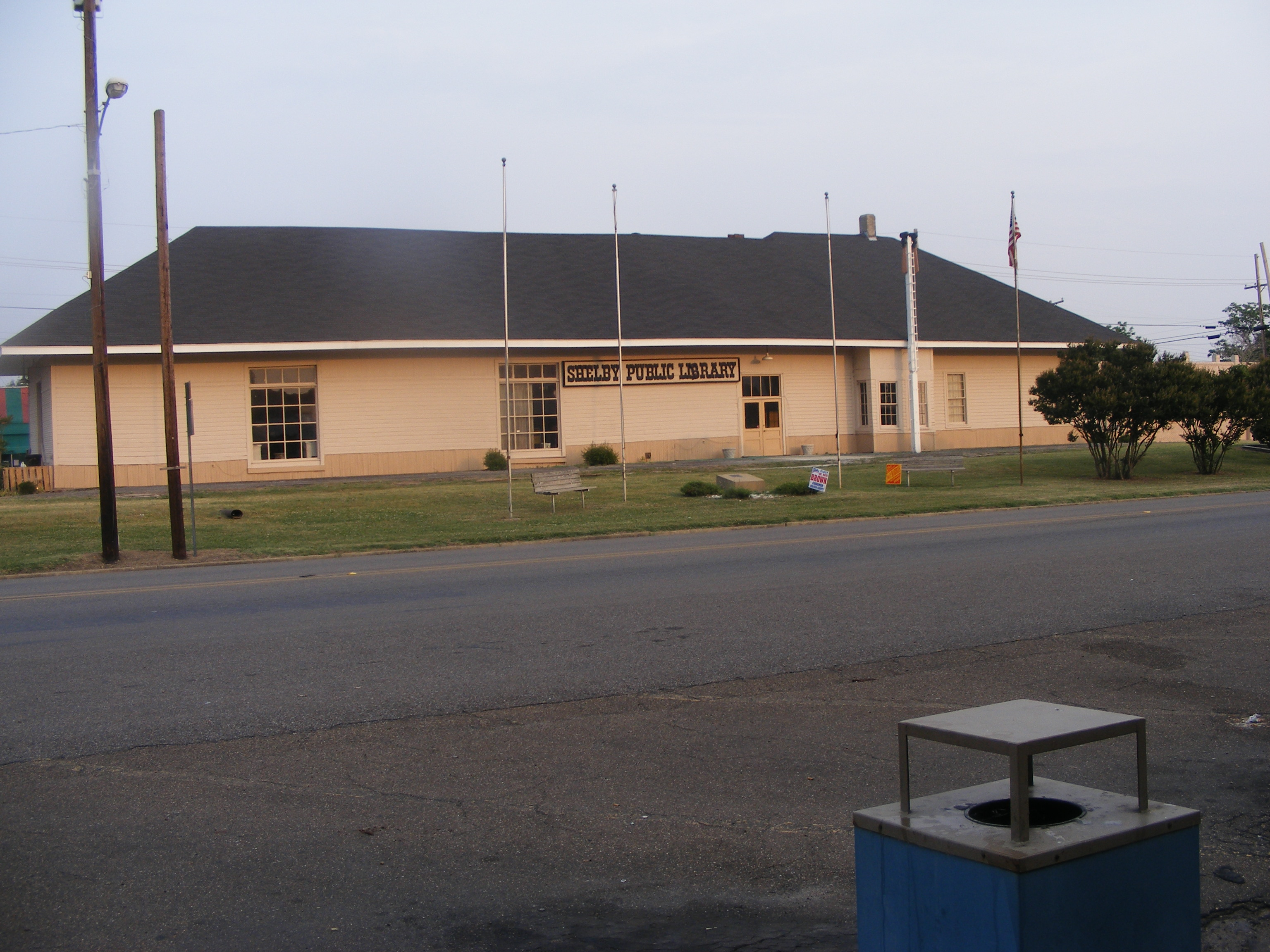
Shelby Public Library, located on MS 161

Past US 61 and US 278, the route intersects Moody Road, the closest connector to US 61 and US 278. The road enters Winstonville at Winston Street, crosses Mount Bayou near Bruce Street, and it leaves the town at Mack Williams Street. Near Tarsi Road, the route turns north and enters Shelby as Broadway Street. MS 161 travels through the residential area of Shelby, and downtown Shelby near Fourth Avenue. The route intersects MS 32 at Second Avenue and travels northward through the town. The road exits the city limits past Blue Cain Road, and it turns eastward past the intersection. MS 161 ends at a three-way junction with US 61 and US 278 north of Shelby.

In 2000, US 61 was rerouted between Merigold and Shelby, and its old alignment became MS 161. Before US 61 was relocated to a four-lane divided highway, the two-lane road had stop signs and low speed limits that significantly slowed through traffic.

Major intersections

The entire route is in Bolivar County.

Location	mi	km	Destinations	Notes
	0.000	0.000	US 61 / US 278	Southern terminus
Shelby	9.381	15.097	MS 32 (Second Avenue)	
	10.866	17.487	US 61 / US 278	Northern terminus
1.000 mi = 1.609 km; 1.000 km = 0.621 mi

== Clarksdale–Lyon ==
Mississippi Highway 161
- Location: Clarksdale–Lyon
- Length: 6.250 mi (10.058 km)
- Existed: August 2004–present

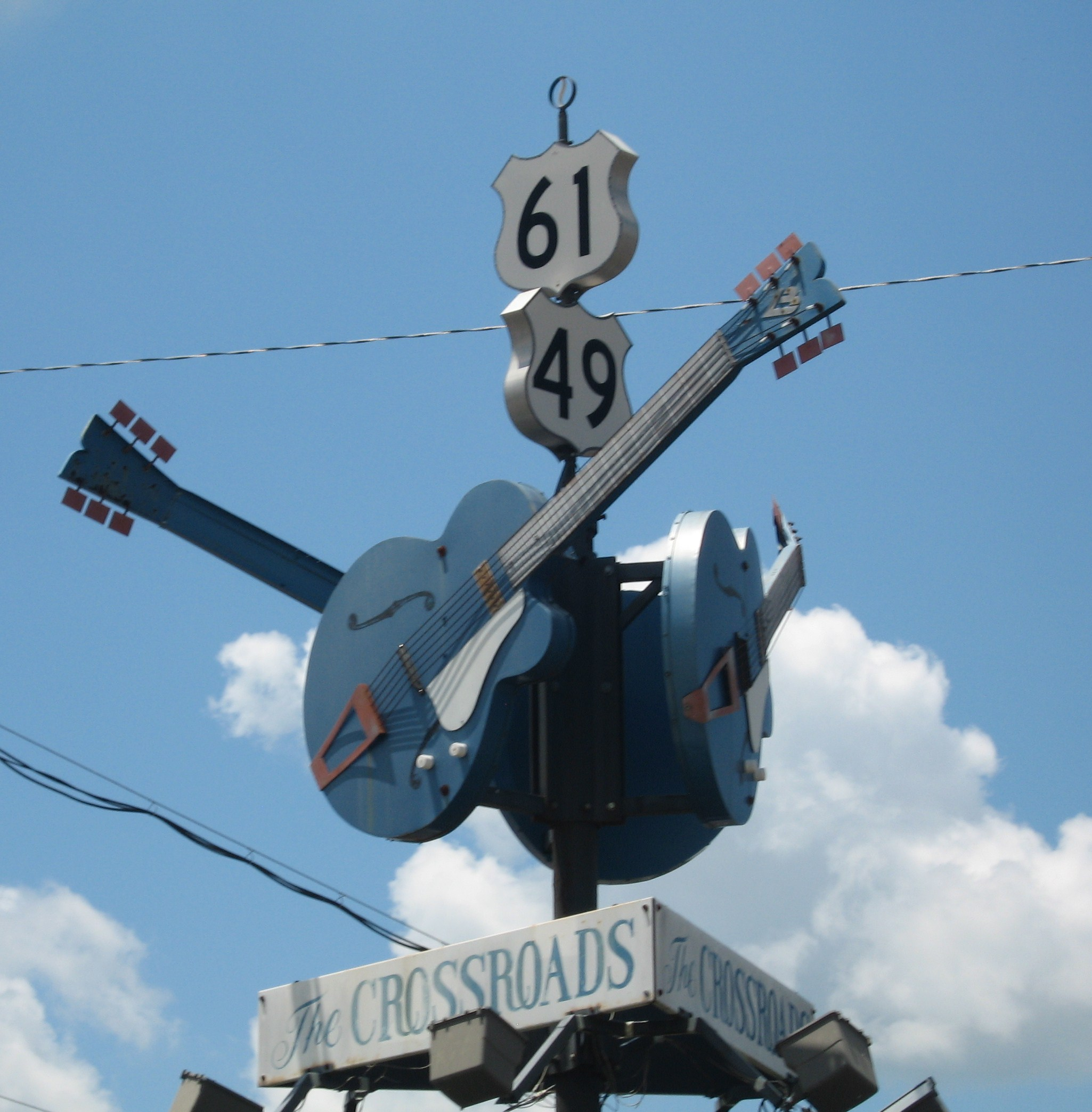
The Crossroads sign at MS 161 and MS 149

MS 161 starts at an intersection with US 61, US 278, and MS 322 in Clarksdale. The route travels northeast, concurrent to MS 322, across several farms before reaching Sherard Road, where MS 322 continues westward to Sherard. Known as South State Street, MS 161 continues northeastward towards a commercial area of Clarksdale, and it crosses the Sunflower River. The road name changes to North State Street, and it intersects Desoto Avenue, which travels to downtown Clarksdale northbound and US 49 southbound. The intersection is home to the "Crossroads" sign, a sculpture that commemorates the alleged location where musician Robert Johnson sold his soul to the devil to learn how to play the blues. MS 161 turns east briefly at Lincoln Place, before continuing northeastward past Sycamore Street. The route travels along the edge of the city, and it soon intersects the western terminus of MS 6, which leads to US 278. The road enters Lyon north of the intersection, and it intersects Bobo and Fontaine Streets. MS 161 leaves the town north of Hopson Street and Roberson Road, and the road ends at a three-way junction with US 49 and US 61.

US 61 was rerouted onto the new bypass around Clarksdale in August 2004, and MS 161 was designated on its old alignment.

Major intersections

The entire route is in Coahoma County.

Location	mi	km	Destinations	Notes
Clarksdale	0.000	0.000	US 61 / US 278 / MS 322 east – Cleveland, Greenville	Southern terminus; southern end of MS 322 concurrency
Clarksdale	1.189	1.914	MS 322 west (Sherard Road) – Sherard	Northern end of MS 322 concurrency
Clarksdale	2.838	4.567	Desoto Avenue to US 49 south – Greenwood	Former US 49
Clarksdale	4.689	7.546	MS 6 east – Marks, Batesville	Western terminus of MS 6
	6.250	10.058	US 61 / US 49 – Tunica, Memphis	Northern terminus
1.000 mi = 1.609 km; 1.000 km = 0.621 mi: Concurrency terminus

== Walls ==
Mississippi Highway 161
- Location: Walls
- Length: 2.756 mi (4.435 km)
- Existed: 1999–present

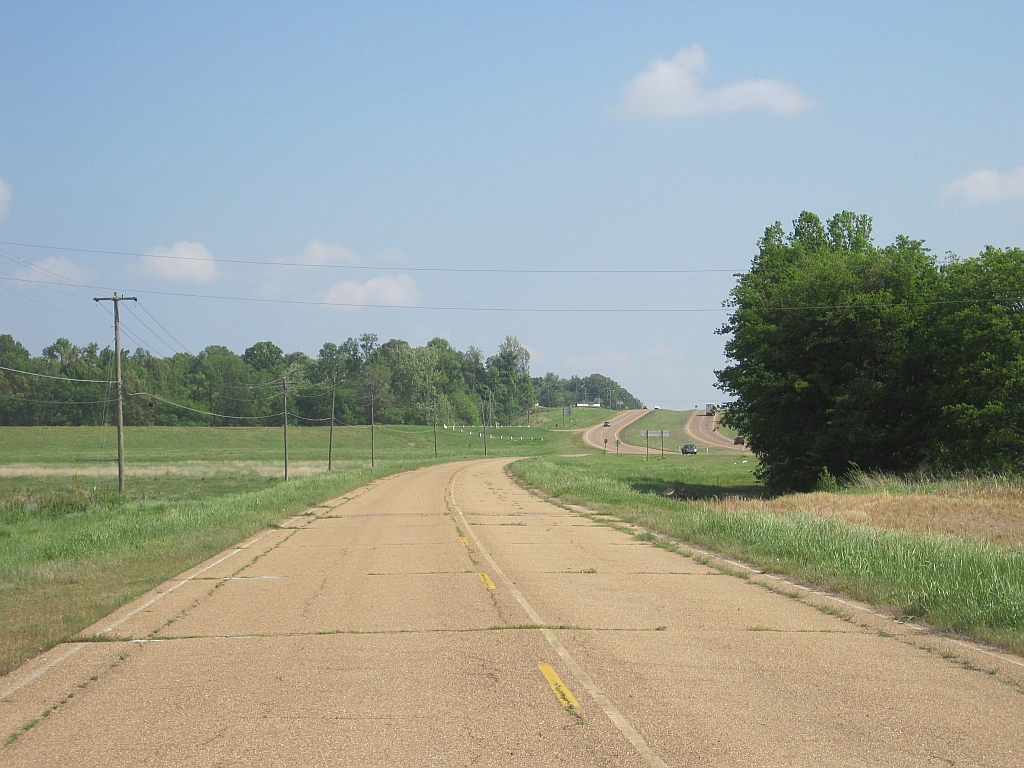
MS 161 northbound near US 61 in Walls

MS 161 starts at US 61 inside the city limits of Walls, and it travels along a two-lane road northeastward through a rural area. At Sullivan Road, the route enters the center of the town and begins to turn northward. MS 161 passes through the town, intersecting Second Street and Delta View Road. Past the center of the town, the road travels through more farmland and intersects MS 302 at a T-intersection. The route leaves the city limits of Walls, and it continues for one mile (1.6 km) before ending at US 61.

In 1999, US 61 was rerouted out of Walls, and the old alignment became MS 161.

Major intersections

The entire route is in DeSoto County.

Location	mi	km	Destinations	Notes
Walls	0.000	0.000	US 61	Southern terminus
Walls	1.713– 1.730	2.757– 2.784	MS 302 east – Memphis, Horn Lake	Western terminus of MS 302
	2.756	4.435	US 61	Northern terminus
1.000 mi = 1.609 km; 1.000 km = 0.621 mi
