= Carter, Mississippi =

- Unincorporated community
- Location within Mississippi Location within the United States
- Coordinates: 32°59′20″N 90°26′57″W
- Country: United States
- State: Mississippi
- County: Yazoo
- Elevation: 102 ft (31 m)
- Time zone: UTC-6 (Central (CST))
  - Summer (DST): UTC-5 (CDT)
- ZIP code: 39194
- Area code: 662
- GNIS feature ID: 668106

Carter is an unincorporated community located in northern Yazoo County, Mississippi, United States. Carter is approximately 5 miles (8.0 km) north of Yazoo City and 9 miles (14 km) south of Silver City near U.S. Route 49W.

Residents are within the Yazoo County School District. Residents are zoned to Yazoo County Middle School and Yazoo County High School.
