= Mississippi Highway 322 =

Highway in Mississippi

Mississippi Highway 322

Route information
- Maintained by MDOT
- Length: 43.859 mi (70.584 km) 35.202 miles (56.652 km) excluding concurrencies
- Existed: 1956–present

Major junctions
- West end: MS 1 in Sherard
- Future I-69 / US 49 / US 61 / US 278 in Clarksdale; MS 3 in Lambert
- East end: MS 35 near Crowder

Location
- Country: United States
- State: Mississippi
- Counties: Coahoma, Quitman, Panola

Highway system
- Mississippi State Highway System; Interstate; US; State
← MS 321	→ MS 328

Mississippi Highway 322 (MS 322) is an east-west state highway connecting Sherard at MS 1 to Crowder at MS 35. Traveling through Coahoma, Quitman, Panola counties, it has a length of 43.9 miles (70.7 km) and connects Clarksdale, Hopson, Lambert, and Crowder.

== Route description ==
MS 322 begins in the unincorporated community of Sherard at MS 1. The highway heads due east and enters the city limits of Clarksdale, but travels to the west and south of the downtown area. In the city, it carries the name Sherard Road. Within the city, MS 322 travels mostly past commercial and light industrial businesses. At MS 161, MS 322 turns to the southwest to form a concurrency with it for just over one mile (1.6 km). At the southwest corner of Clarksdale, MS 161 ends at an intersection with U.S. Route 61 (US 61) and US 278 however MS 322 continues along US 61 and US 278 along its freeway bypass of Clarksdale. MS 322 exits the freeway at the interchange with US 49 and then runs concurrent with it to the southeast for about one-half mile (0.80 km) in the community of Hopson. An independent route again, the roadway heads east through agricultural fields and leaves Coahoma County for Quitman County.

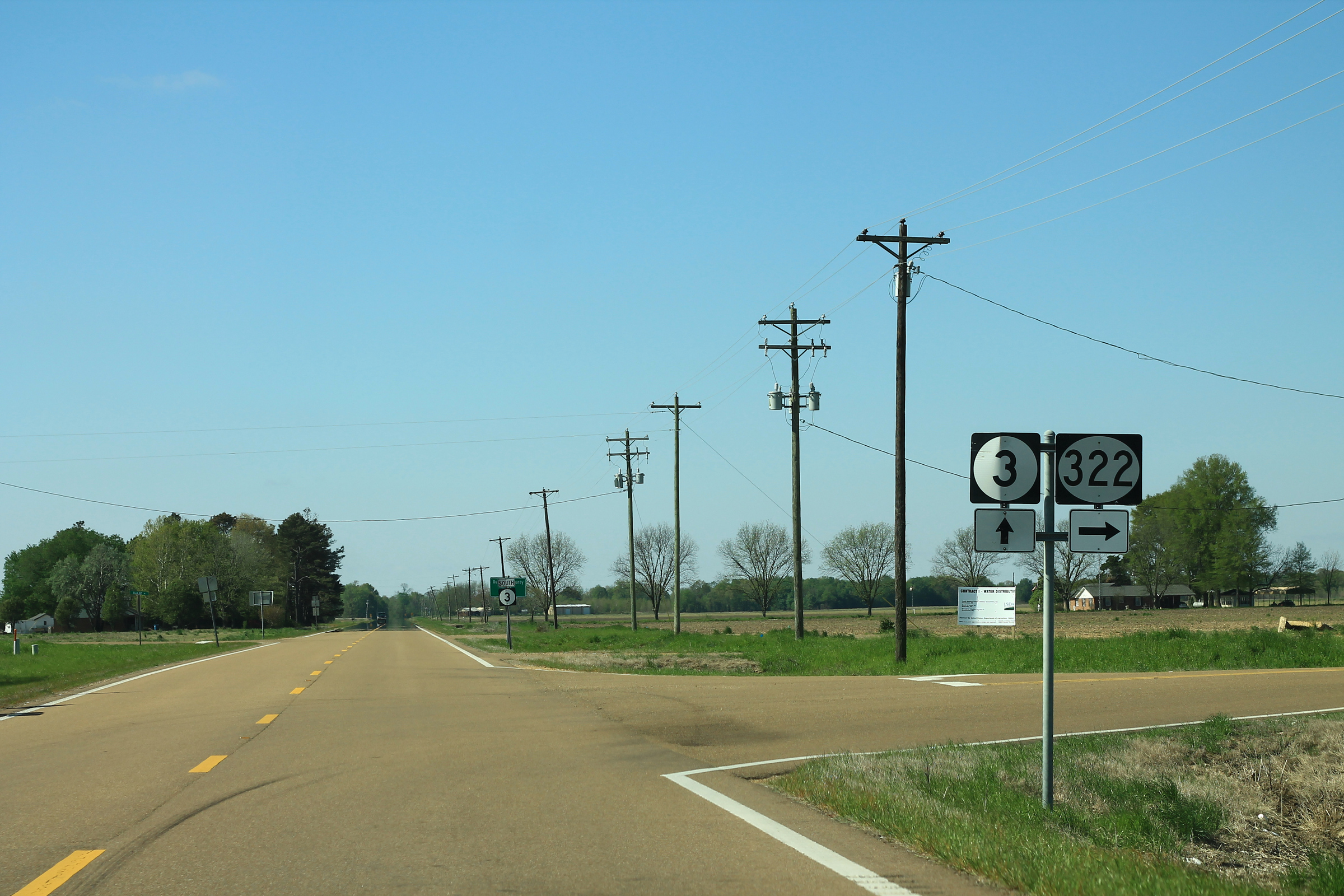
Southern end of MS 3/MS 322 concurrency

After continuing east through farmlands in Quitman County for 8.5 miles (13.7 km), MS 322 reaches an intersection with MS 3. The two routes head north and enter the town of Lambert. At Scott Avenue, MS 322 leaves the concurrency and heads east, crossing a railroad and intersecting MS 321. At first, the highway heads due east, but then takes a more curvy path around bayous, Little Tallahatchie River, and Old Yocona River. MS 322 enters the town of Crowder on 3rd Street. Near the center of town, MS 322 takes a one-block jog north on Quitman Avenue before resuming an easterly course on 2nd Street. MS 322 heads into Panola County, still within the town of Crowder, heading in a general eastern direction, again crossing the Little Tallahatchie River, and ends at MS 35.

Except along its concurrencies with U.S. highways around Clarksdale, the entire road is two lanes wide and is fully state-maintained.

== Major intersections ==
County	Location	mi	km	Destinations	Notes
Coahoma	Sherard	0.000	0.000	MS 1 – Rosedale, Greenville, Friars Point	Western terminus
Coahoma	Clarksdale	7.444	11.980	MS 161 north (South State Street) – Clarksdale	Western end of MS 161 concurrency
Coahoma	Clarksdale	8.633	13.893	Future I-69 south / US 61 south / US 278 west / MS 161 ends – Cleveland	Western end of US 61 / US 278 concurrency; eastern end of MS 161 concurrency; southern terminus of MS 161
Coahoma	Clarksdale	9.637– 10.078	15.509– 16.219	New Africa Road - Downtown Clarksdale	Interchange
Coahoma	Clarksdale	11.944– 12.340	19.222– 19.859	Future I-69 north / US 49 north / US 61 north / US 278 east (Desoto Avenue) / MS 149 north – Clarksdale, Helena-West Helena, Memphis, Delta Blues Museum	Interchange; eastern end of US 61 / US 278 concurrency; western end of US 49 concurrency; southern terminus of MS 149
Coahoma	Clarksdale	12.899	20.759	US 49 south (Hopson Pixley Road) – Greenwood, Indianola	Eastern end of US 49 concurrency
Quitman		27.011	43.470	MS 3 south	Western end of MS 3 concurrency
Quitman	Lambert	30.213	48.623	MS 3 north (10th Street) / Scott Avenue	Eastern end of MS 3 concurrency
Quitman	Lambert	30.500	49.085	MS 321 south (6th Street) – O'Keefe WMA	Northern terminus of MS 321
Panola		43.859	70.584	MS 35	Eastern terminus
1.000 mi = 1.609 km; 1.000 km = 0.621 mi: Concurrency terminus
