= A Land Remembered =

Book by Patrick D. Smith

- First edition
- Author: Patrick D. Smith
- Original title: A Land Remembered
- Translator: English
- Illustrator: Patrick D. Smith
- Cover artist: Patrick D. Smith
- Language: English
- Genre: Historical fiction
- Publisher: Pineapple Press
- Publication date: 1984
- Publication place: United States
- Media type: Print (Hardcover)
- Pages: 403pp
- ISBN: 0-910923-12-4
- OCLC: 10825213
- Dewey Decimal: 813/.54 19
- LC Class: PS3569.M53785 L3 1984

A Land Remembered is a best-selling novel written by author Patrick D. Smith, and published in 1984 by Pineapple Press. It is historical fiction set mostly in pioneer or "cracker" Florida. The story covers over a century of Florida history from 1858 to 1968.

It is available in both hardcover and trade paperback editions. There is also a two-volume edition for children, which is used in many Florida schools.

== Plot summary ==
A Land Remembered focuses on the fictional story of the MacIveys, who migrated from Georgia into Florida in the mid-19th century. After settling, this family struggles to survive in the harsh environment. First they scratch a living from the land and then learn to round up wild cattle and drive them to Punta Rassa to ship to Cuba. Over three generations, they amass more holdings and money, and move further from their connection to the native, untamed land.

== The author ==
Patrick D. Smith, a multiple award-winning author, was born in Mendenhall, Mississippi, and later moved to Florida in 1966. A Land Remembered is his sixth published novel, following The River Is Home, The Beginning, Forever Island, Allapattah, and Angel City.

== Characters ==
Tobias MacIvey
In the beginning of the novel, Tobias moves from his home in Georgia down to Florida. He becomes rich from cattle herding with his family and later an orange grove. He gets malaria from an attack of several hundred thousand mosquitos, but is healed (temporarily) by Miami Billie, an Indian medicine man. Tobias dies near the end of the portion of the book in which his son Zech is the main character when he becomes too weak to fight his malaria from the cold. He dies trying to save their orange trees from a freeze. Tobias is known in the novel as being selfless and caring for others, and throughout the novel he respects Indian and black men, in a time where many white men are racist.
Emma MacIvey
Emma is Tobias's wife. Her main occupation is cooking for all the men, with the help of Pearlie Mae and Glenda. She never complains. Everybody who knows her loves her. She dies from a heart attack a few years before her husband Tobias.
Zechariah MacIvey
Zech is the main character during the second generation. He lives a somewhat lonely life away from other children and had two dogs, Nip and Tuck, who are killed, and a Marsh Tackie horse named Ishmael. He marries Glenda and has a son Solomon, called Sol. He has a fling with an Indian woman named Tawanda, which results in another son, Toby Cypress. Zech is an experienced gunman and horse rider and kills several bandits. When getting revenge his foot is shot and he is weaker till his death in a horse-riding accident and drowns.
Glenda MacIvey
Zech's wife. She seems more of a tomboy in her adulthood and gives birth to two children throughout her life, one of which ends in a miscarriage. She dies near the end of Zech's life when she's impaled by a bull. Zech shoots the bull out of rage.
Solomon MacIvey
The third generation's main character. He lives a sad life of power. After his father's death he becomes power-hungry, wanting to leave a mark with his money and the business his family started. He calls himself "the least of the MacIveys". Eventually he finds Bonnie, a young waitress, and changes. After her death in a hurricane and a reunion with Toby he eventually realizes the destruction his greed has brought upon the land. He goes to Punta Rassa to live his last days. He dies of a heart attack at the end of the book.
Bonnie
Solomon's love interest. She's the daughter of an abusive father and is hired by Solomon as a housewife. The two live together for almost seven years. They finally admit they want to get married as she and Sol are in the roof rafters trying to ride out a hurricane. She is ripped away from Sol and is counted among the 2,000 dead. Sol later dislikes the lake which carried their house away and dikes it.
Skillit
A black former slave. He is encountered by Tobias after slavery is banned, wearing only a pair of feed-sack pants. He has nowhere to go, and is on the run when Tobias's dogs find him hiding in a hole. Tobias hires him. He is a great help in catching cows, since he is much stronger than all the other cattle drovers. He eventually marries a former slave, Pearlie Mae. He leaves later to start a farm, calling himself Skillit MacIvey on the land deed. Skillit only appears two more times in the book: when he returns for Tobias's funeral and when Sol remembers all the people in his life.
Pearlie Mae
A black former slave. Though half his age, she marries Skillit and gives birth to five children.
Frog
A hired worker, former town drunk. Bonzo and he begin working for Tobias for their first successful mission. Frog is seen as almost a brother to Tobias and he is always a help. He dies from being impaled by the same bull that killed Glenda, and is buried next to Tobias and Emma. As he lies dying, he asks Zech if his gravestone can read "Frog MacIvey" and Zech agrees, claiming he would have done that anyway.
Bonzo
A hired worker, former town drunk. He says little, compared to Frog. He dies from malaria early in the book.
Lester
A worker hired by Zech to replace Bonzo.
Tawanda
Zech's Seminole Indian mistress. He only sees her three times. The first time when he and his father deliver cows to the Indian village, the second when Zech comes to get two new horses, the third when he comes back to visit the village again. When they come to Tobias' funeral, Tawanda's parents inform Zech of her death during childbirth. Zech buys a headstone for her that reads "Tawanda MacIvey, Beloved".
Toby
Son of Tawanda and Zech. Although ridiculed by other children in his village because of his white father, he is respected by the adults because of his MacIvey blood. When Zech visits the village, the two bond. When he is 15, he sees his father again, now with his other son, Sol, and the two brothers start to bond. Toby later becomes the village chief and has three children with his wife, Minnie. He comes to hate Sol for ruining the forest, and the two avoid contact for almost half a century. He sees Sol again when Sol is about to die, making his peace with his half-brother.
Nip & Tuck
Two dogs given to the MacIveys by the Indians, they get killed by bushwhackers and only add to how much Zech hates bushwhackers.

== See also ==
- Florida cracker
- Florida cracker architecture
- Florida Cracker Trail
- Marjorie Kinnan Rawlings
- Zora Neale Hurston
