= KhaDarel Hodge =

American football player (born 1995)

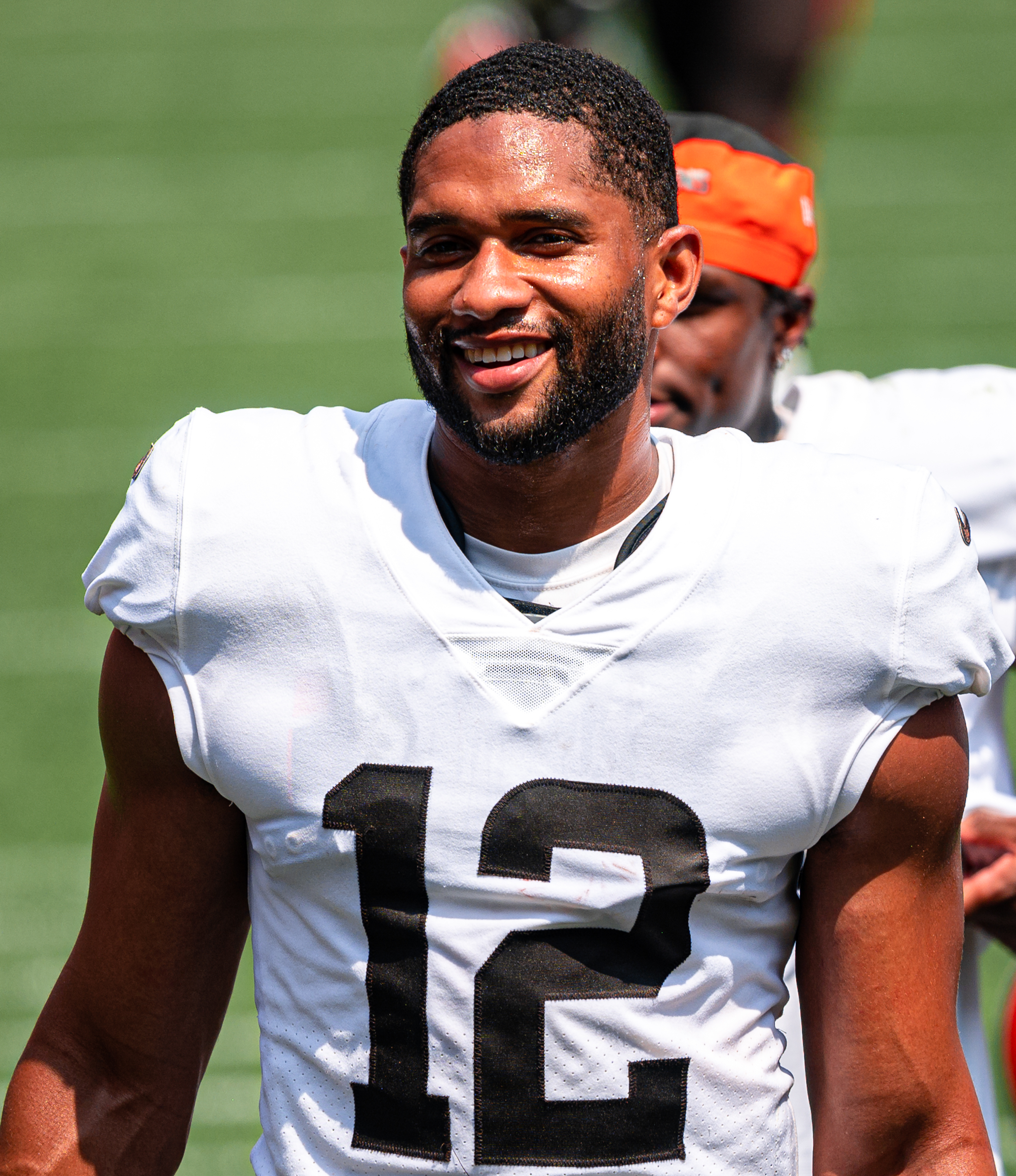
- Hodge with the Cleveland Browns in 2021

No. 86 – San Francisco 49ers
- Position: Wide receiver
- Roster status: Practice squad

Personal information
- Born: January 3, 1995 (age 31); D'Lo, Mississippi, U.S.
- Listed height: 6 ft 2 in (1.88 m)
- Listed weight: 210 lb (95 kg)

Career information
- High school: Mendenhall (Mendenhall, Mississippi)
- College: Alcorn State (2013); Hinds CC (2014); Prairie View A&M (2015–2017)
- NFL draft: 2018: undrafted

Career history
- Los Angeles Rams (2018); Cleveland Browns (2019–2020); Detroit Lions (2021); Atlanta Falcons (2022–2025); San Francisco 49ers (2026–present)

Awards and highlights
- Pro Bowl (2024); First-team All-SWAC (2017)

Career NFL statistics as of Week 3, 2026
- Receptions: 68
- Receiving yards: 1,044
- Total tackles: 58
- Fumble recoveries: 3
- Total touchdowns: 3
- Stats at Pro Football Reference

KhaDarel Jamal Hodge (born January 3, 1995) is an American professional football wide receiver for the San Francisco 49ers of the National Football League (NFL). He played college football for the Prairie View A&M Panthers and signed with the Los Angeles Rams as an undrafted free agent in 2018. Hodge has also played for the Cleveland Browns, Detroit Lions, and Atlanta Falcons.

== Early life ==
Hodge was born on January 3, 1995 in D'Lo, Mississippi and raised there with three siblings by a single mother, Michelle Hodge, and by his grandfather, who is a preacher. Hodge attended and played high school football at Mendenhall High School. He became the starting quarterback at Mendenhall during his sophomore season and threw for over 3,000 passing yards and ran for over 2,000 yards along with 68 total touchdowns during his junior and senior seasons. Hodge was named second-team All-State his senior season.

== College career ==
Hodge began his career as a quarterback at Alcorn State but left after one year, during which he redshirted. He then went to Hinds Community College, where he transitioned to wide receiver, for one season before moving on to Prairie View A&M. Hodge played three seasons for the Panthers, catching 104 passes for 1,797 yards and 21 touchdowns. As a senior, Hodge had 48 receptions for 844 yards and 12 touchdowns and was named first-team All-Southwestern Athletic Conference and Black College All-America.

== Professional career ==
Pre-draft measurables
Height	Weight	Arm length	Hand span	Wingspan	40-yard dash	Vertical jump	Broad jump
6 ft 1 3/4 in (1.87 m)	198 lb (90 kg)	31 1/4 in (0.79 m)	9 1/2 in (0.24 m)	6 ft 4 1/8 in (1.93 m)	4.58 s	38.0 in (0.97 m)	10 ft 4 in (3.15 m)
All values from Pro Day

=== Los Angeles Rams ===
Hodge signed with the Los Angeles Rams as an undrafted free agent on July 25, 2018, after participating in a tryout. He was cut by the Rams at the end of training camp on September 1 and was subsequently signed to their practice squad the following day. Hodge was promoted to the active roster on September 19. Hodge caught his first career pass, a 14-yard reception, on October 7 against the Seattle Seahawks. Hodge played in 14 regular season games during his rookie season, catching two passes for 17 yards and making five tackles on special teams and one tackle in three postseason games, including Super Bowl LIII.

Hodge signed an exclusive rights contract with the Rams on March 12, 2019. He was waived during final roster cuts on August 31.

=== Cleveland Browns ===
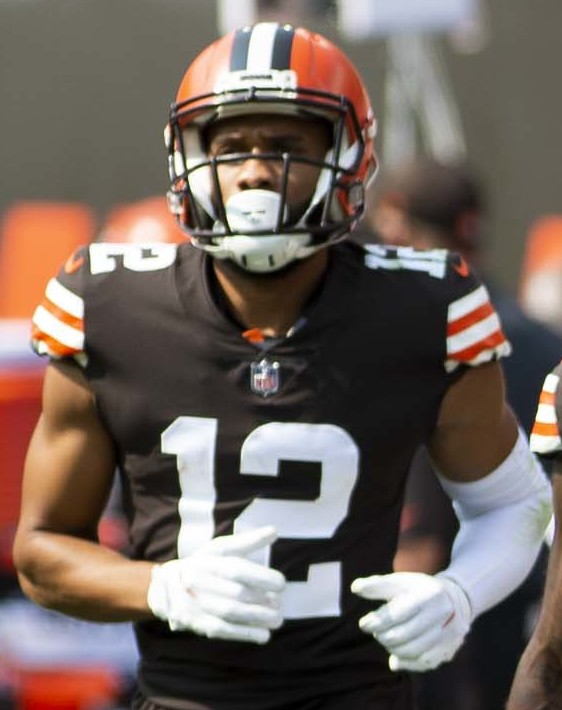
Hodge in 2020

Hodge was claimed off waivers by the Cleveland Browns on September 1, 2019. Hodge played in all 16 of the Browns games, catching four passes for 76 yards and led the team with 13 special teams tackles.

Hodge was tendered by the Browns for the 2020 season, and signed the one-year tender on April 16, 2020. Hodge was placed on injured reserve on October 6. Hodge was activated from injured reserve on October 31. He was placed on the reserve/COVID-19 list by the team on December 26, and activated on December 31. Hodge was placed back on the COVID-19 list on January 5, 2021, and activated on January 14. Hodge finished the season with 11 receptions for 180 yards on 17 targets in nine games played.

The Browns placed a restricted free agent tender on Hodge on March 16, 2021, which he signed on May 26. Hodge was waived by the Browns on August 31.

=== Detroit Lions ===
Hodge was claimed off waivers by the Detroit Lions on September 1, 2021. He made 16 appearances (one start) for Detroit, recording 13 receptions for 157 yards.

=== Atlanta Falcons ===
On March 25, 2022, Hodge signed with the Atlanta Falcons. He played in all 17 games for Atlanta, recording 13 receptions for 202 yards and one touchdown.

On April 11, 2023, Hodge re-signed with the Falcons on a one-year contract. He once again appeared in all 17 games for the Falcons, logging 14 receptions for 232 scoreless yards.

On March 14, 2024, Hodge re-signed with the Falcons again on a one-year deal. During Week 5 against the Tampa Bay Buccaneers, Hodge scored the game-winning 45 yard receiving touchdown in the 36–30 overtime victory. During a Week 15 victory over the Raiders, Hodge blocked a punt and tipped another, earning him NFC Special Teams Player of the Week. Appearing in all 17 games, registering seven receptions for 131 yards and one touchdown. Hodge was named the NFC Special Teamer for the Pro Bowl at the end of the 2024 season, the first of his career.

On March 17, 2025, Hodge once more re-signed with Atlanta on a two-year, $6 million contract. He made 12 appearances (one start) for the Falcons, posting three receptions for 31 scoreless yards. On December 19, Hodge was placed on season-ending injured reserve due to a shoulder injury.

On March 9, 2026, Hodge was released by the Falcons.

=== San Francisco 49ers ===
On August 5, 2026, Hodge signed with the San Francisco 49ers on a one-year contract. Hodge was released on August 30 as a part of final roster cuts, but was re-signed to the team's practice squad the next day. On September 10, Hodge was elevated to the active roster for the game against the Los Angeles Rams. Six days later, he was promoted to the active roster. Hodge was released on October 1. On November 2, 2026, Hodge was re-signed to the team's practice squad.

== NFL career statistics ==
=== Regular season ===
Year	Team	Games		Receiving							Fumbles	
Year	Team	GP	GS	Rec	Tgt	Yds	Avg	Lng	TD	FD	Fum	Lost
2018	LAR	14	0	2	3	17	8.5	14	0	1	0	0
2019	CLE	16	1	4	10	76	19.0	41	0	3	1	0
2020	CLE	9	0	11	17	180	16.4	42	0	11	0	0
2021	DET	16	1	13	27	157	12.1	42	0	7	0	0
2022	ATL	17	1	13	20	202	15.5	39	1	7	0	0
2023	ATL	17	4	14	23	232	16.6	52	0	13	0	0
2024	ATL	17	2	7	12	131	18.7	45	1	6	0	0
2025	ATL	12	1	3	10	31	10.3	16	0	2	0	0
Career		118	10	67	122	1,026	15.3	52	2	50	1	0
