= James D. Montgomery & Associates =

Law firm. Formerly known as Chicago Office of the Cochran Firm

James D. Montgomery & Associates, Ltd.
- Headquarters: Chicago, Illinois, USA
- No. of offices: 1
- No. of attorneys: 8
- Major practice areas: Personal injury Wrongful death
- Company type: LLC
- Website: www.jamesdmontgomery.com

James D. Montgomery & Associates, Ltd. is a Chicago-based personal-injury and wrongful-death law firm. The firm formerly served as the Chicago office of The Cochran Firm.

== Attorneys ==
Partners

- James D. Montgomery Sr. James D. Montgomery Sr. currently serves as a Trustee on the board of trustees to the University of Illinois. Mr. Montgomery served as Corporation Counsel to the City of Chicago under Harold Washington.
- James M. Sanford
- John K. Kennedy

Associates

- Daniel Watkins, II
- Michelle M. Montgomery

== Cases ==
- The firm represents the family of Rekia Boyd, who was shot and killed by Dante Servin, an off-duty Chicago police officer.
- The firm represents the family of Anthony Kyser, who was choked to death by a CVS store manager in an alley after allegedly stealing some toothpaste from a CVS store.
- The firm represents the family of Ontario Billups, who was shot and killed by Tracey A. Williams of the Chicago Police Department while unarmed.
- The firm was the lead counsel for plaintiffs in the litigation arising from the E2 nightclub stampede.
- The firm achieved a $16 million settlement from the City of Chicago for the killing by a police officer of Latanya Haggerty.

== See also ==
- Fitch, Even, Tabin & Flannery
