= Cottondale, Mississippi =

- Ghost town
- Location within Mississippi Location within the United States
- Coordinates: 33°41′24″N 90°32′34″W
- Country: United States
- State: Mississippi
- County: Sunflower
- Elevation: 121 ft (37 m)
- Time zone: UTC-6 (Central (CST))
  - Summer (DST): UTC-5 (CDT)
- ZIP code: 38771
- Area code: 662
- GNIS feature ID: 668853

Cottondale is a ghost town located in Sunflower County, Mississippi. Cottondale is located on U.S. Highway 49W and is approximately 2 miles (3.2 km) south of Ruleville and approximately 2.6 miles (4.2 km) north of Doddsville.

Cottondale was located on the former Illinois Central Gulf Railroad.

A post office operated under the name Cottondale from 1918 to 1919.
