= Southern Academy of Letters, Arts and Sciences =

American scientific award

The Southern Academy of Letters, Arts and Sciences awarded the Order of the South. Recipients include Eudora Welty, James Dickey, David Nolan and Patrick D. Smith. The award was established in 1971. The Academy included an Institute of Southern Affairs in Jacksonville, Florida. Andrew Lytle, editor of the Sewanee Review, also received the award.
