= Sanatorium, Mississippi =

Unincorporated community in Mississippi, US

- Unincorporated community
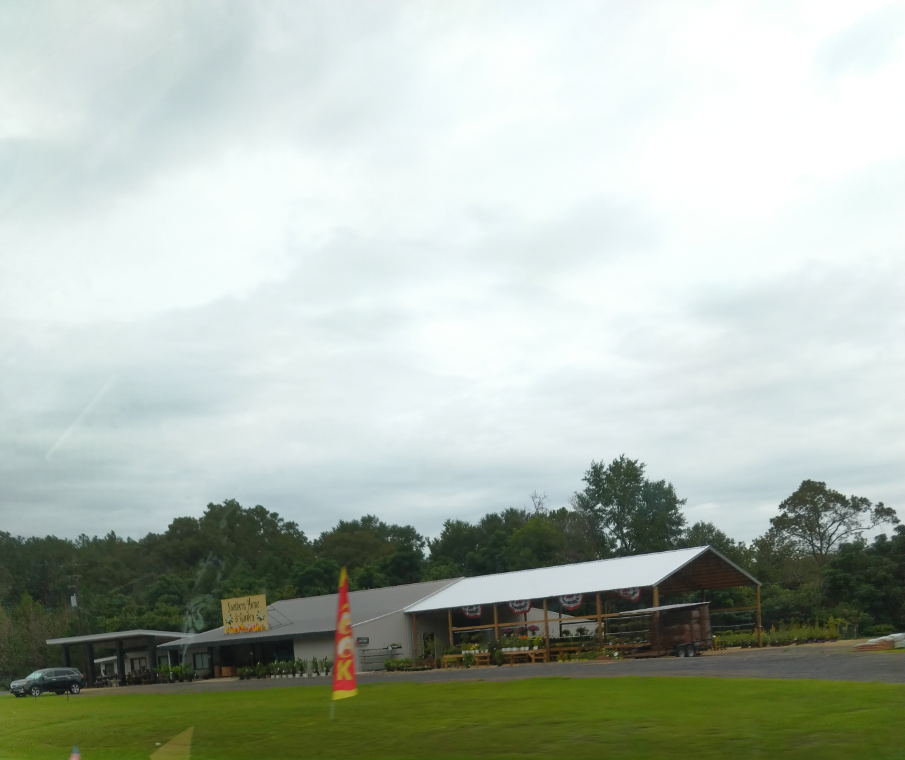

- Location within Mississippi Location within the United States
- Coordinates: 31°53′55.57″N 89°46′39.27″W
- Country: United States
- State: Mississippi
- County: Simpson
- Elevation: 528 ft (161 m)
- Time zone: UTC-6 (Central (CST))
  - Summer (DST): UTC-5 (CDT)
- Area code: 601
- GNIS feature ID: 677315

Sanatorium is an unincorporated community in Simpson County, Mississippi, United States, northwest of Magee. The community was named for the Mississippi Tuberculosis Sanatorium, founded in 1916, which was a hospital for tuberculosis patients from 1918 to the 1950s.

In 1976, the old Sanatorium facilities were transferred to the Mississippi Department of Mental Health and renamed Boswell Regional Center, which is now an Intermediate Care Facility for Persons with Mental Retardation and other developmental disabilities (ICF-MR). Its central building, Dexter Hall, received a Heritage Award for Restoration in 2014.

Sanatorium lies between the current U.S. Route 49 and Mississippi Highway 149 (Old Highway 49), and it was once home to the only drive-in movie theatre in the region. The Scaife (San) Hotel on Highway 149 which was converted into a halfway house in the 1990s. The hotel was destroyed by fire on May 18, 2020.

Legion Lake, a state-operated recreational lake, sits due north of the community. In the 1990s, the Sanatorium postal address was abolished, and the local post office on the grounds of Boswell Regional Center was demolished.
