= Mississippi Highway 321 =

Highway in Mississippi

Mississippi Highway 321

Route information
- Maintained by MDOT and Quitman County
- Existed: 1956–present

Section 1
- Length: 5.916 mi (9.521 km)
- South end: MS 32 near Webb
- North end: Brazil Quitman County Road in Brazil

Section 2
- Length: 3.215 mi (5.174 km)
- South end: Anderson Road / Schieleville Road near Lambert
- North end: MS 322 in Lambert

Location
- Country: United States
- State: Mississippi
- Counties: Tallahatchie, Quitman

Highway system
- Mississippi State Highway System; Interstate; US; State
← MS 316	→ MS 322

Mississippi Highway 321 (MS 321) is a state highway consisting of two segments, one connecting Webb to Brazil in Tallahatchie County, the other in Quitman County in and around Lambert. It is a two-lane road for its entire length.

== Route description ==
The southern segment of MS 321 begins about one mile (1.6 km) east of Webb along MS 32 and Pecan Road. The two-lane state maintained highway heads north eventually paralleling the Tallahatchie River. The road is otherwise surrounded by agricultural fields. In the unincorporated community of Brazil, state maintenance ends before the road, continuing north as Brazil Quitman County Road, crosses Buzzard Bayou.

The northern segment of MS 321, completely maintained by Quitman County and the town of Lambert, begins at the intersection of Anderson Road and Schieleville Road. The intersection is located near the former Camp B of the Mississippi State Penitentiary, now mostly the O'Keefe Wildlife Management Area. The road heads due north paralleling a railroad and traveling through farmland before the road enters the town of Lambert. In the town, MS 321 carries the name 6th Street and passes by houses and churches. MS 321 ends at an intersection with MS 322 in Lambert.

== Major intersections ==
County	Location	mi	km	Destinations	Notes
Tallahatchie		0.000	0.000	MS 32 / Pecan Road – Webb, Charleston	Southern terminus of southern segment
Tallahatchie	Brazil	5.916	9.521	Brazil Quitman County Road	Northern terminus of southern segment
Gap in route
Quitman		5.916	9.521	Anderson Road / Schieleville Road	Southern terminus of northern segment
Quitman	Lambert	9.131	14.695	MS 322 (Scott Avenue) / 6th Street	Northern terminus of northern segment
1.000 mi = 1.609 km; 1.000 km = 0.621 mi
