= Patrick D. Smith =

American novelist (1927–2014)

Patrick Davis Smith
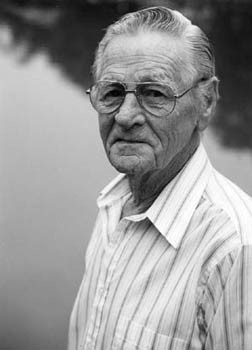
- Born: October 8, 1927; D'Lo, Mississippi
- Died: January 26, 2014 (aged 86); Merritt Island, Florida
- Education: University of Mississippi
- Occupations: Public relations, author
- Spouse: Iris Doty
- Children: Patrick Smith, Jr., Jane Smith
- Writing career
- Language: English
- Genre: Historical fiction
- Notable work: A Land Remembered
- Notable awards: Order of the South
- Website: patricksmithonline.com

Patrick Davis Smith (October 8, 1927 – January 26, 2014) was an American author. His work was nominated seven times for the Pulitzer Prize and five times for the Nobel Prize for Literature. He was inducted into the Florida Artists Hall of Fame in 1999.

== Biography ==
Born in D'Lo, Mississippi, Smith graduated from the University of Mississippi in 1947. On August 1, 1948, he married Iris Doty, with whom he remained until his death. He continued his studies until 1959, when he completed his M.A. Smith worked in public affairs at Hinds Junior College until 1962 and at the University of Mississippi until 1966, when he moved to Florida and took the position of Director of Public Relations at Brevard Community College, which became Eastern Florida State College in August 2013.

Smith wrote his first novel, The River is Home, when he was 25. It is the story of the Skeeters, a poor family of "river rats" in Mississippi. His next novel was Forever Island, the story of an old Seminole struggling against the development of the land where he has lived his whole life. That was followed by Allapattah, another novel of the Seminole culture. Smith's next book, Angel City, is the story of a poor family's struggles after being ensnared in a migrant camp. In 1980, it was made into a CBS movie of the week, starring Ralph Waite and Jennifer Jason Leigh.

Smith's best-known work is A Land Remembered, a multi-generational novel of a family's struggles from pioneers to wealthy tycoons.

He died in Merritt Island, Florida, at age 86.

== Bibliography ==
Forever Island (1973)
Angel City: A Novel (1978)
Allapattah (1979)
A Land Remembered (1984)
The River is Home (1989)
The Beginning: A Novel (1998)
The Last Ride (2000)
In Search of the Russian Bear: An American Writer's Odyssey in the Former Soviet Union (2001)
The Seas That Mourn (2003)
A White Deer and Other Stories (2007)
