= James D. Montgomery (attorney) =

James D. Montgomery Sr.
- Born: February 17, 1932 (age 94); Louise, Mississippi, U.S.
- Education: University of Illinois (BA); University of Illinois College of Law (JD)
- Occupation: Attorney
- Employer: James D. Montgomery & Associates
- Organization: Black Panther Party (legal counsel)
- Known for: Civil rights litigation
- Board member of: University of Illinois
- Website: jamesdmontgomery.com

James D. Montgomery Sr. (born February 17, 1932, in Louise, Mississippi) is a prominent African-American attorney in Chicago and one of the Trustees for the University of Illinois.

Montgomery previously served as Corporation Counsel for the City of Chicago under Mayor Harold Washington.
