= D'Lo, Mississippi =

- Town
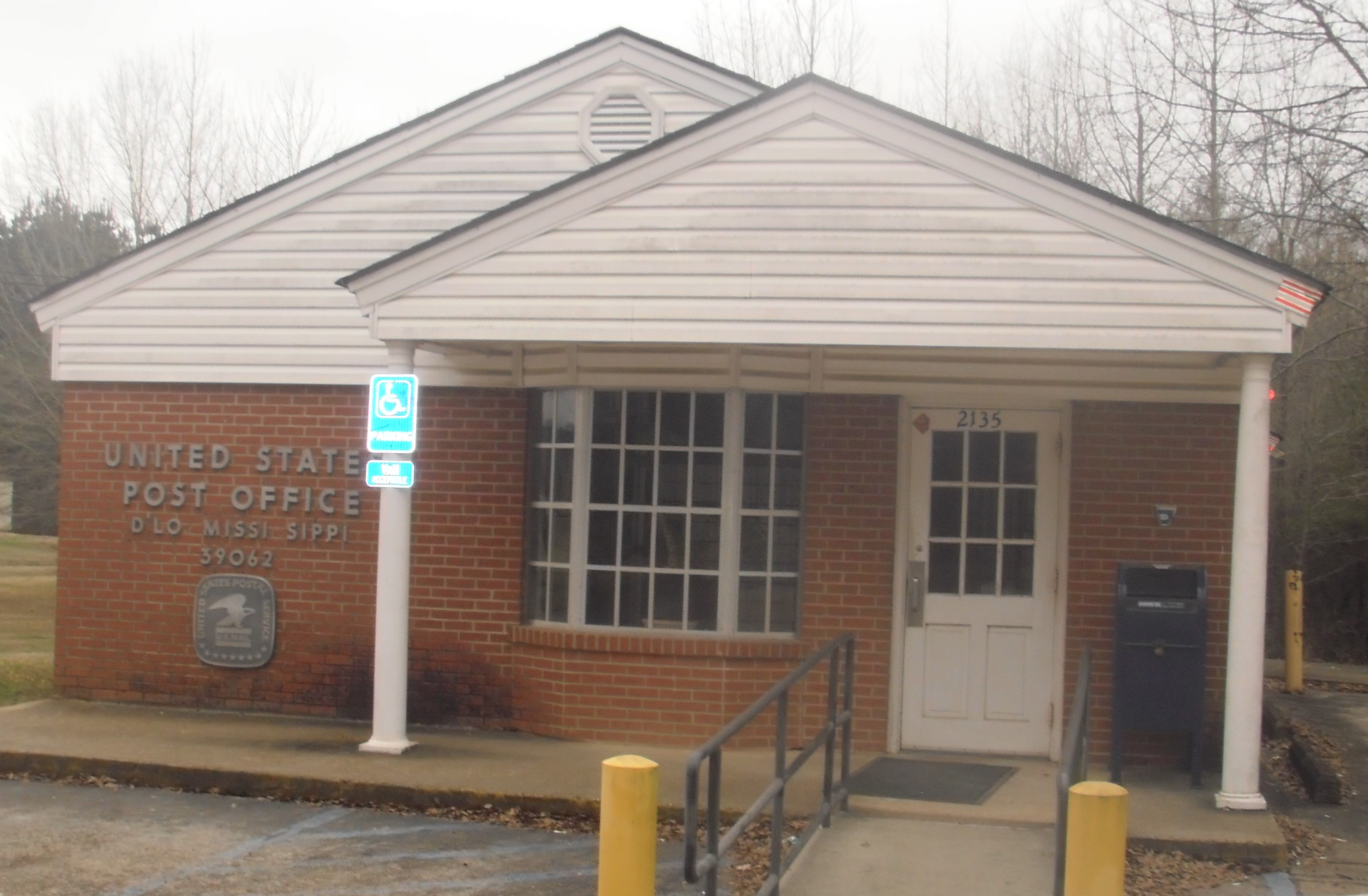
- D'Lo Post Office

- Location of D'Lo, Mississippi

- Location in the United States
- Coordinates: 31°59′12″N 89°54′4″W
- Country: United States
- State: Mississippi
- County: Simpson

Government
  - Type: Mayor-Council
  - Mayor: John Henry Berry
  - Board of Aldermen: Pam Smith; Terry Hartwig; Ruth Griffin; Danny Bankston; Michael Shoemaker

Area
  - Total: 0.69 sq mi (1.80 km^{2})
  - Land: 0.69 sq mi (1.80 km^{2})
  - Water: 0 sq mi (0.00 km^{2})
- Elevation: 299 ft (91 m)

Population (2020)
  - Total: 373
  - Density: 536.2/sq mi (207.02/km^{2})
- Time zone: UTC-6 (CST)
  - Summer (DST): UTC-5 (CDT)
- ZIP code: 39062
- Area code: 601
- FIPS code: 28-19340
- GNIS feature ID: 0669070

D'Lo is a town in Simpson County, Mississippi, United States, along the Strong River. The population was 373 at the 2020 census. It is part of the Jackson, Mississippi metropolitan area.

The town was featured in Life magazine for sending more men per capita to serve in World War II than any other town of its size; 38 percent of the men who lived in D'Lo served.

In 2016, the town was featured on the UP reality TV series, Small Town, Big Mayor.

== History ==
The town of D'Lo was founded by R. W. May on March 1, 1900, when a town plat was registered with the Simpson County Board of Supervisors, March 1, 1900. On August 16, 1901, a village by the name "D'Lo" was incorporated and boundaries identified by Governor of Mississippi. The village of "D'Lo" was raised to the rank of "town" on October 27, 1905, by proclamation and signed by the Governor Mississippi.

The name D'Lo is a modification of the name of the local U.S. Post Office, which was named "Dlo" from 1881 to January 1, 1950. The Post Office was established and approved June 17, 1881, under the name "Dlo". The first postmaster was May's wife, Mary Frances May, and the post office was run from May's home until it moved with the establishment of the town. The name "Dlo" was chosen by the contract postal rider on the Brandon-Westville mail route after the initial choice, "Millhaven", was rejected by the Post Office Department. Just as the Strong River got its name from a translation of a Choctaw word describing the strong taste of the river water – which has a large amount of tannic acid dissolved in it – "Dlo" derives from a French phrase meaning "Bitter Undrinkable Water", which appears on an early map of the area. The phrase beginning "De l'eau non potable..." was shortened to "Dlo", and then "D'Lo."

The town expanded in 1916 when the Finkbine Lumber Company chose it as the location for a $1,000,000 sawmill plant. Finkbine constructed many houses in the community for their workers, as well as a combination dry goods, hardware, grocery store, farm supply, feed and seed, and general store known as Kew Mercantile Company. During the peak of the Finkbine's sawmill plant operation, between 1916 and 1930, Millhaven was recognized as the largest town between Jackson and Hattiesburg. It had two large YMCA buildings, a movie theater, ten grocery stores, a furniture store, three appliance dealers, ten gas stations, seven butcher's markets, a dry cleaner, five cafes, three auto shops, a boat building and cabinet shop, a machine shop, three pharmacies, a bank, lighted basketball courts, professional basketball and baseball teams, and a newspaper called The D'Lo Herald.

The town also had Baptist and Methodist churches, and a three-story brick school with 550 students and 17 teachers. Its three-story Pine View Hospital was considered the best hospital between Jackson and the Mississippi Gulf Coast, as far as equipment and doctors were concerned. During this time the population of Millhaven was estimated to be around 5,000, which made it the second largest milling town in the United States. However, by the 1930s the Finkbine Mill had consumed almost all the timber in the surrounding counties, and the plant was shut down.

With the Finkbine sawmill closed, D'Lo lost jobs and suffered a major decline in population. It took several years for the town's economy to begin to recover. With the construction of U.S. Route 49 through the town, Lumber companies could reach second-growth of timber in the surrounding areas. A new hardwood sawmill reportedly supplied timber to firms that built weapons and equipment for World War II. Although the mill was effective at keeping the town going for many years, it was never a large enough operation to recoup the huge loss of population. Once with a population of 5,000, during the 1940s, the town had around 400 residents. This is the estimated population in the 21st century.

Of the town's population of about 400, around 150 males served in the Armed Forces during World War II. About 46 volunteers also served prior to the bombing of Pearl Harbor. So many citizens served in the war that the town's story was featured in the July 6, 1942, edition of Life magazine. The story featured a picture of two young boys standing in the deserted streets of D'Lo with the headline, "D'Lo Men Have Gone Off to War", with a caption that stated, "There is a war and a country is in danger. When that happens the men drop what they are doing and go off from the deep southern hamlet of D'Lo, Miss." A monument located at the town's community center lists the D'Lo citizens who served during the war.

The name was changed to D'Lo effective January 1, 1950.

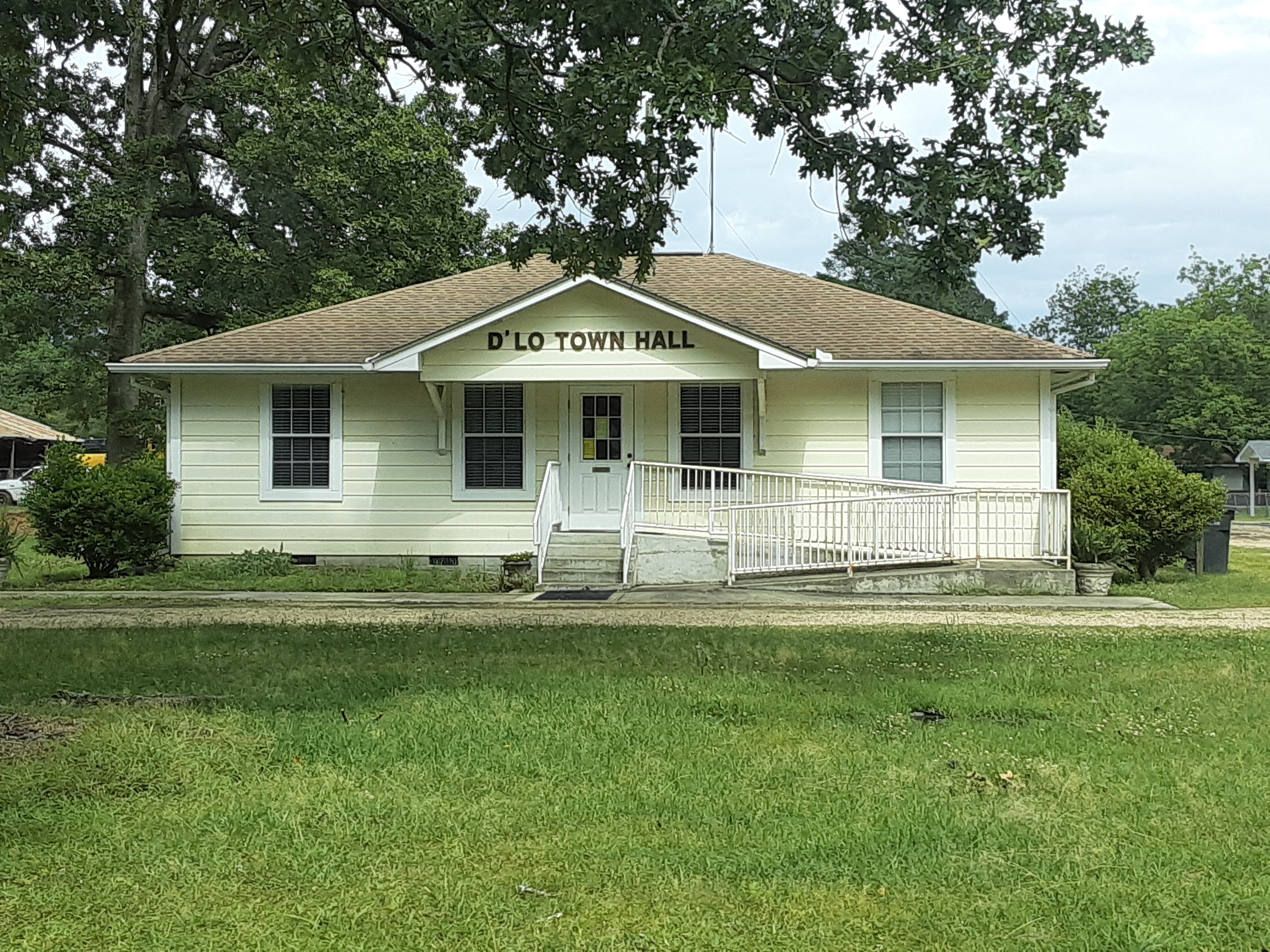
D'Lo Town Hall

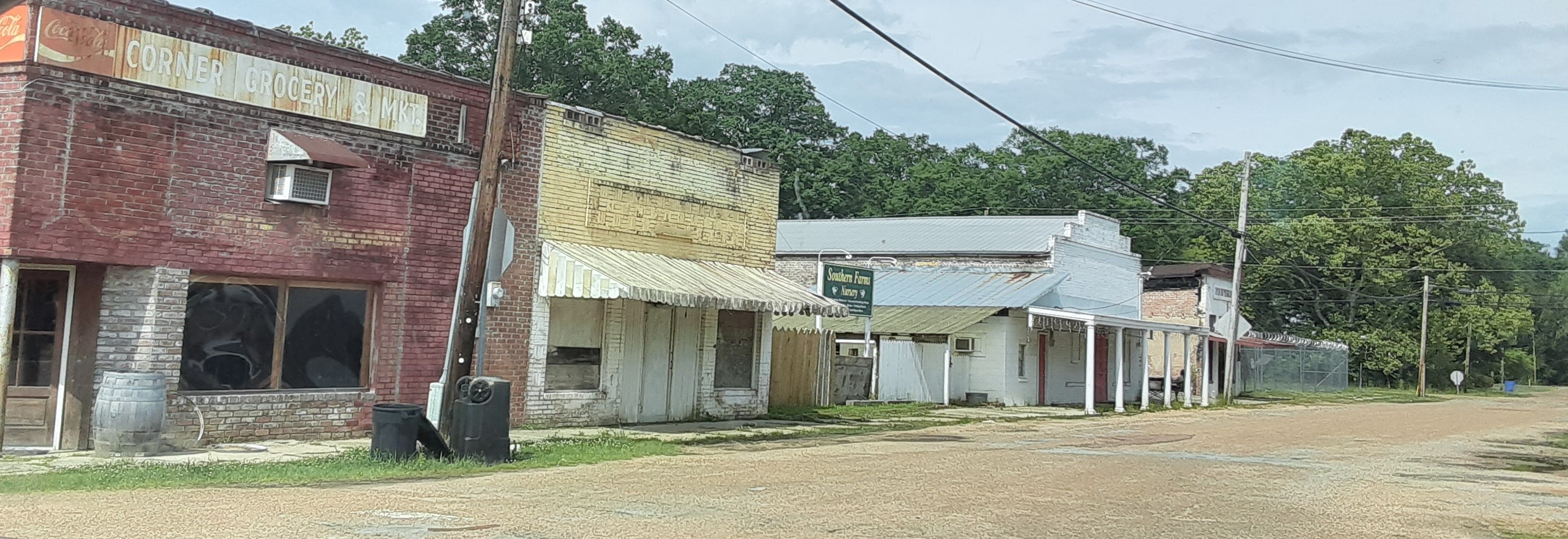
D'Lo, 2021

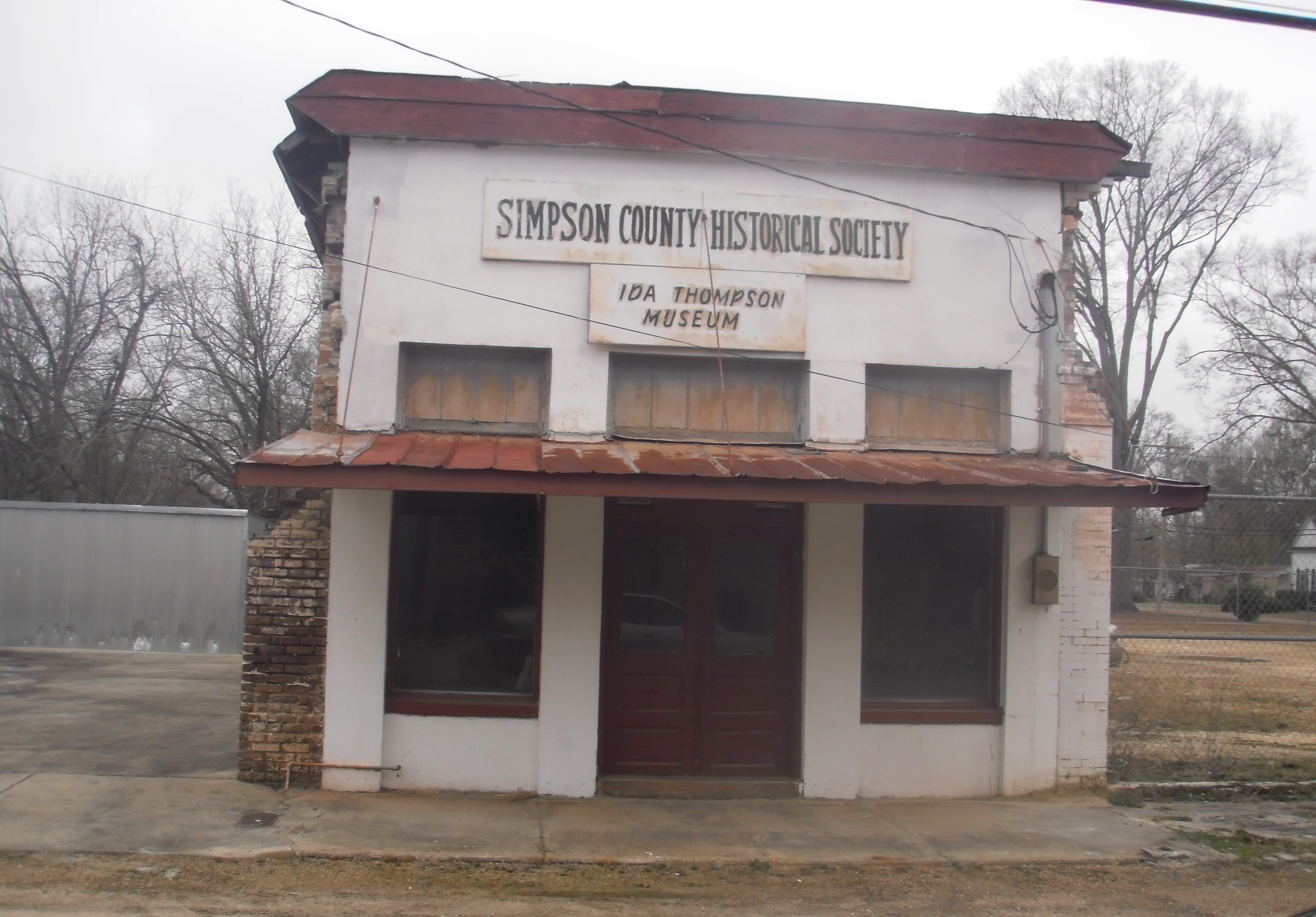
Simpson County Historical Society building in D'Lo

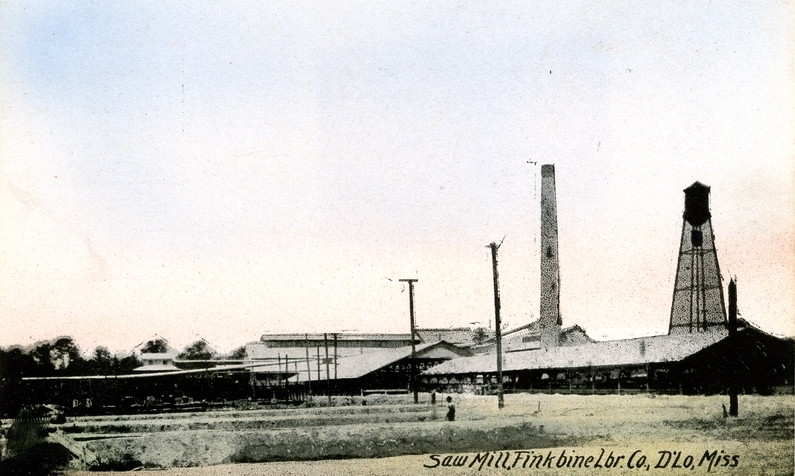
Finkbine Lumber Company Sawmill, D'Lo, circa 1920

== Geography ==
According to the United States Census Bureau, the town has a total area of 0.7-square-mile (1.8 km^{2}), all land.

== Demographics ==
Historical population
| Census | Pop. | Note | %± |
|---|---|---|---|
| 1910 | 284 | | — |
| 1920 | 646 | | 127.5% |
| 1930 | 514 | | −20.4% |
| 1940 | 400 | | −22.2% |
| 1950 | 516 | | 29.0% |
| 1960 | 428 | | −17.1% |
| 1970 | 485 | | 13.3% |
| 1980 | 463 | | −4.5% |
| 1990 | 421 | | −9.1% |
| 2000 | 394 | | −6.4% |
| 2010 | 452 | | 14.7% |
| 2020 | 373 | | −17.5% |
U.S. Decennial Census

As of the census of 2000, there were 394 people, 179 households, and 114 families residing in the town. The population density was 569.7 inhabitants per square mile (220.0/km^{2}). There were 206 housing units at an average density of 297.8 per square mile (115.0/km^{2}). The racial makeup of the town was 79.19% White, 19.54% African American, 0.51% Native American, 0.25% Pacific Islander, and 0.51% from two or more races.

There were 179 households, out of which 24.0% had children under the age of 18 living with them, 50.3% were married couples living together, 10.6% had a female householder with no husband present, and 35.8% were non-families. 34.1% of all households were made up of individuals, and 19.0% had someone living alone who was 65 years of age or older. The average household size was 2.20 and the average family size was 2.77.

In the town, the population was spread out, with 20.3% under the age of 18, 9.6% from 18 to 24, 22.6% from 25 to 44, 27.9% from 45 to 64, and 19.5% who were 65 years of age or older. The median age was 42 years. For every 100 females, there were 79.9 males. For every 100 females age 18 and over, there were 81.5 males.

The median income for a household in the town was $28,750, and the median income for a family was $33,125. Males had a median income of $27,500 versus $21,731 for females. The per capita income for the town was $15,469. About 11.7% of families and 13.7% of the population were below the poverty line, including 15.6% of those under age 18 and 17.6% of those age 65 or over.

== Parks and recreation ==
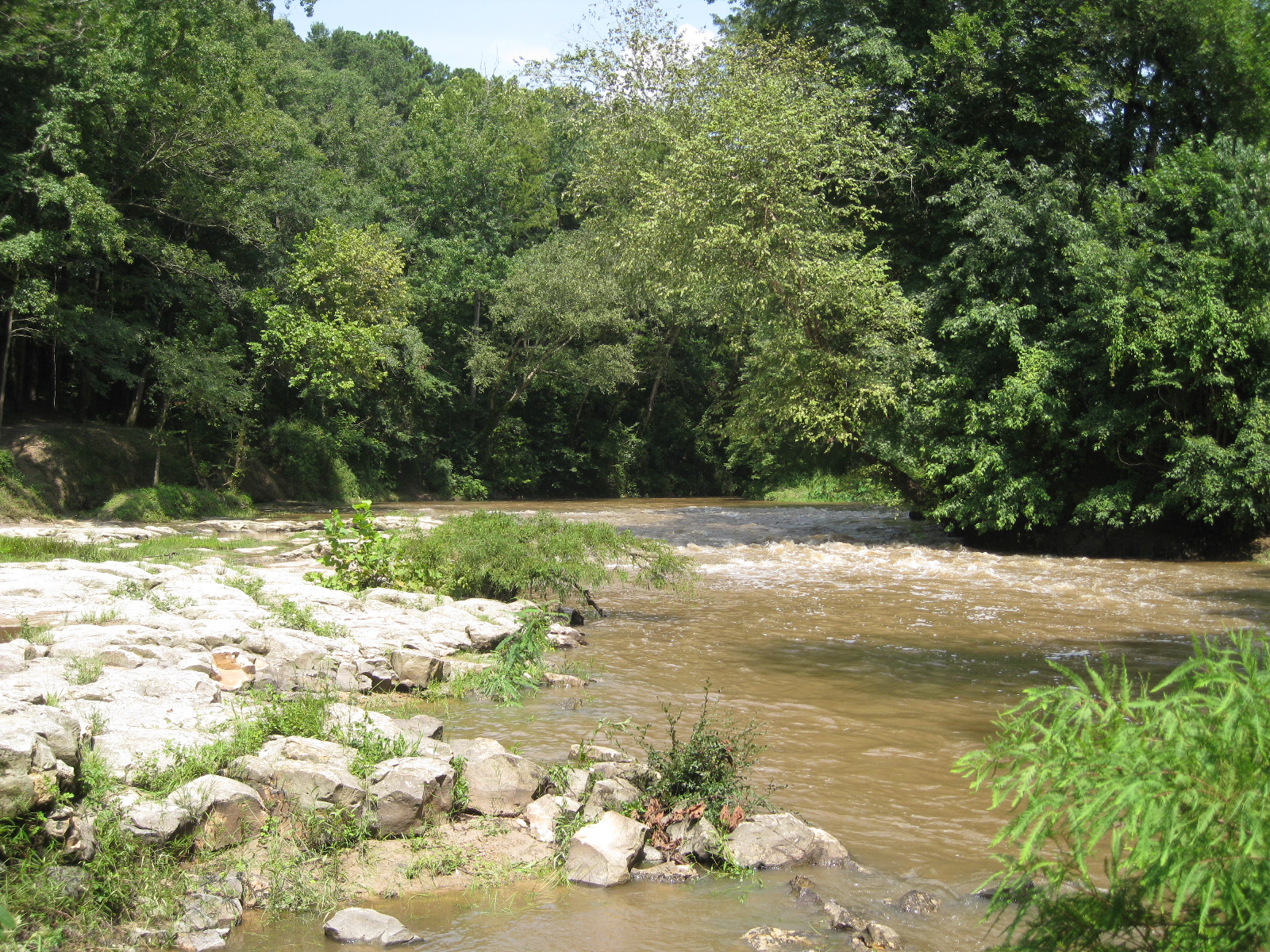
The Strong River at the D'Lo Water Park

D'Lo has a water park on the Strong River, called D'Lo Water Park. A one-screen movie theatre, called the "Lux Theatre", closed in the 1950s.

== Education ==
The town of D'Lo is served by the Simpson County School District.

== Notable people ==
- Joe L. Allbritton (1924–2012), businessman
- KhaDarel Hodge, NFL football player
- Fred James Cassibry, United States federal judge
- Patrick D. Smith, author

== In popular culture ==
- A portion of the 2000 film O Brother, Where Art Thou?, known as the "Siren Scene", was filmed on the banks of the Strong River at the D'Lo Water Park.

== Etymology ==
Three different stories explain how the odd name originated. The oldest and probably the most common story claims that an early settler referred to this area along the Strong River, where it commonly floods, as being "too damn low". When it came time for the village to get a post office, he suggested that the village be named "too damn low", but the postal authorities would not approve of the name because of the profanity. Someone supposedly suggested the name "D-Low", which over the years was shortened to "D'Lo".

Another account said that Millhaven was rejected by the postal authorities as a town name. Purportedly the US Postal Service provided the village with a list of alternative four-letter names for the residents to choose from. Among these names was one spelled "Delo". After the citizens chose this name, a penman prepared a letter to be sent back to the authorities informing them of the name they had chosen. The letter was written in a script that may have put the lower case "e" in Delo above the "lo". The story concludes that the little "e" was probably misinterpreted as an apostrophe and therefore the post office documented the village name as being D'Lo.

The last version involves the adaptation of a French phrase: See § History.
