= Strong River =

River in south-central Mississippi in the United States

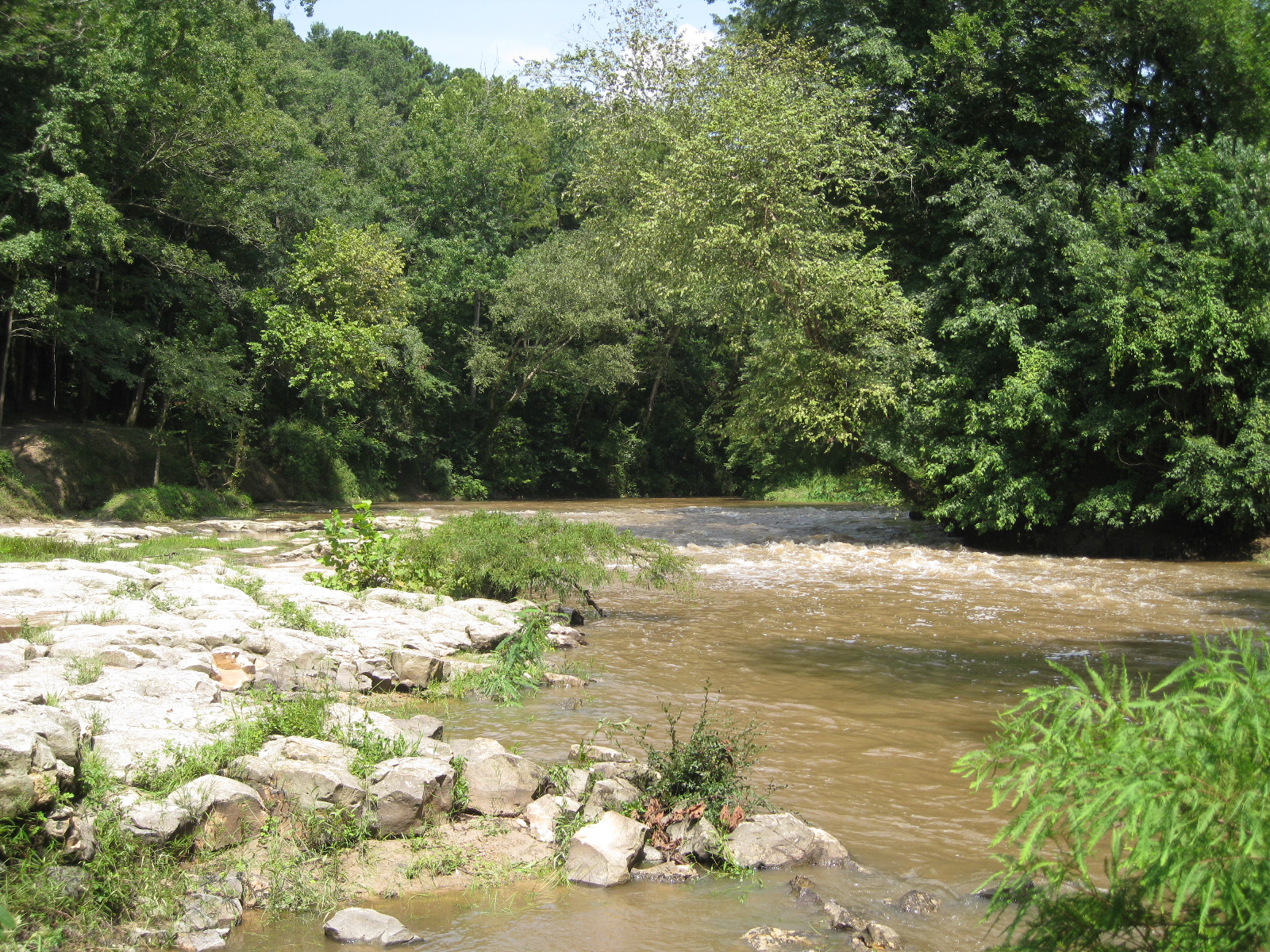
The Strong River at the D'Lo Water Park in D'Lo, where the "Siren Scene" in O Brother, Where Art Thou? (2000) was filmed.

The Strong River is a 95.2-mile-long (153.2 km) river in south-central Mississippi in the United States. It is a tributary of the Pearl River, which flows to the Gulf of Mexico.

== Course ==
The stream headwaters arise in the Bienville National Forest in Scott County, about 6 miles (10 km) west of Forest at 32°23′08″N 89°35′04″W and at an elevation of about 465 feet (142 meters). and flows generally to the southwest through Smith, Rankin and Simpson counties, past the town of D'Lo. It flows into the Pearl River 2 miles (3 km) southeast of Georgetown at 31°50′59″N 90°08′09″W at an elevation of 197 feet (60 meters).

The Strong River takes its name from the English translation of the Choctaw words boke or boge homi, which means "bitter creek" or "strong tasting creek", a result of the tannic acid dissolved in the water by decomposing leaves. The name has nothing to do with the velocity of the stream.

== See also ==
- List of Mississippi rivers
