= Louise, Mississippi =

- Town
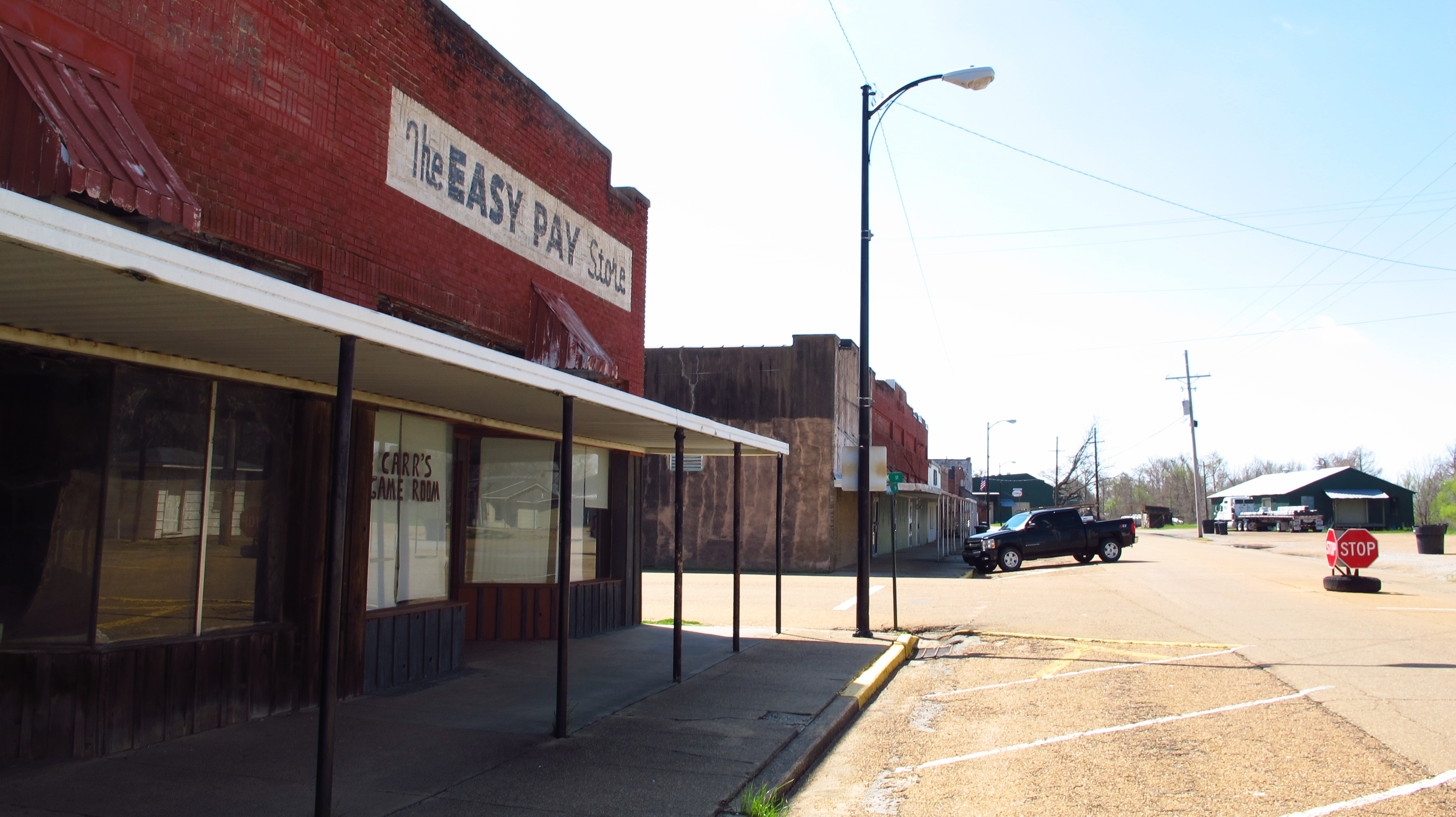
- Main Street in Louise

- Location of Louise, Mississippi

- Location in the United States
- Coordinates: 32°58′53″N 90°35′26″W
- Country: United States
- State: Mississippi
- County: Humphreys

Area
  - Total: 0.18 sq mi (0.46 km^{2})
  - Land: 0.18 sq mi (0.46 km^{2})
  - Water: 0 sq mi (0.00 km^{2})
- Elevation: 105 ft (32 m)

Population (2020)
  - Total: 178
  - Density: 1,008.1/sq mi (389.24/km^{2})
- Time zone: UTC−6 (Central (CST))
  - Summer (DST): UTC−5 (CDT)
- ZIP code: 39097
- Area code: 662
- FIPS code: 28-42240
- GNIS feature ID: 2406048

Louise is a town in Humphreys County, Mississippi. As of the 2020 census, Louise had a population of 178.

== History ==
Louise was initially established following land purchases made during the 1840s and 1850s, including property acquired by James S. Reid in 1852. The town developed after William H. Reid and his wife, Sallie Luse Reid, conveyed a 100 foot strip of land to the Yazoo and Mississippi Valley Railroad on 28 April 1905. Reid subsequently laid out a settlement beside the railway, named it for his daughter, Louise Reid Rainer, and recorded the town plat in Yazoo County on 3 February 1906.

Louise was incorporated on 8 December 1909. Railway access attracted new residents and timber businesses, including the Barr Holaday and Bellgrade lumber companies, for whose employees housing was constructed. Bellgrade selected a mill site at Louise on the branch railway line in November 1916 and began operations on 5 February 1917. The mill had a cutting capacity of approximately 40,000 feet per day and remained in operation through 1936. In 1918, Louise became part of the newly established Humphreys County, having previously been situated in Yazoo County.

The Yazoo and Mississippi Valley Railroad’s Silver City to Kelso branch, which passed through Louise, closed in 1940.

== Geography ==
Louise is located in southern Humphreys County along Silver Creek in the Mississippi Delta region.

According to the United States Census Bureau, the town of Louise has a total area of 0.18 square miles (0.46 km^{2}), all land.

== Demographics ==
Historical population
Census	Pop.	Note	%±
1910	69		—
1920	537		678.3%
1930	514		−4.3%
1940	456		−11.3%
1950	479		5.0%
1960	481		0.4%
1970	444		−7.7%
1980	400		−9.9%
1990	343		−14.2%
2000	315		−8.2%
2010	199		−36.8%
2020	178		−10.6%
U.S. Decennial Census

=== Racial and ethnic composition ===
Louise town, Mississippi – Racial and ethnic composition Note: the US Census treats Hispanic/Latino as an ethnic category. This table excludes Latinos from the racial categories and assigns them to a separate category. Hispanics/Latinos may be of any race.
Race / Ethnicity (NH = Non-Hispanic)	Pop 2000	Pop 2010	Pop 2020	% 20010	% 2010	% 2020
White alone (NH)	138	113	83	43.81%	56.78%	46.83%
Black or African American alone (NH)	171	84	90	54.29%	42.21%	50.56%
Native American or Alaska Native alone (NH)	0	0	0	0.00%	0.00%	0.00%
Asian alone (NH)	5	0	0	1.59%	0.00%	0.00%
Native Hawaiian or Pacific Islander alone (NH)	0	0	0	0.00%	0.00%	0.00%
Other race alone (NH)	0	0	0	0.00%	0.00%	0.00%
Mixed race or Multiracial (NH)	0	1	4	0.00%	0.50%	2.25%
Hispanic or Latino (any race)	1	1	1	0.32%	0.50%	0.56%
Total	315	199	178	100.00%	100.00%	100.00%

=== 2000 census ===
As of the census of 2000, 315 people, 117 households, and 80 families resided in the town. The population density was 1,898.5 inhabitants per square mile (733.0/km^{2}). The 125 housing units averaged 753.4 per square mile (283.9/km^{2}). The racial makeup of the town was 54.29% African American, 44.13% White and 1.59% Asian. Hispanic or Latino people of any race were 0.32% of the population.

Of the 117 households, 25.6% had children under the age of 18 living with them, 45.3% were married couples living together, 21.4% had a female householder with no husband present, and 30.8% were not families. About 24.8% of all households were made up of individuals, and 11.1% had someone living alone who was 65 years of age or older. The average household size was 2.69 and the average family size was 3.28.

In the town, the population was distributed as 26.3% under the age of 18, 8.9% from 18 to 24, 26.0% from 25 to 44, 24.8% from 45 to 64, and 14.0% who were 65 years of age or older. The median age was 34 years. For every 100 females, there were 88.6 males. For every 100 females age 18 and over, there were 75.8 males.

The median income for a household in the town was $28,750, and for a family was $31,875. Males had a median income of $25,625 versus $22,500 for females. The per capita income for the town was $14,658. About 14.0% of families and 13.2% of the population were below the poverty line, including 15.9% of those under age 18 and 40.4% of those age 65 or over.

The per capita income for Humphreys County is $10,926 and ranked 76 of 82 counties. The per capita income for Louise, Mississippi, is $14,658 and ranked 129 of 329 places listed in Mississippi.

== Education ==
The town of Louise is served by the Humphreys County School District.

== Culture and economy ==
Hoover sauce is a bbq sauce made in Louise and exported around the US and to other countries. The sauce was created in Louise by a Chinese immigrant businessman, Lee Hong, who died in 2020.

The United States Postal Service operates the Louise Post Office at 1378 Main Street, which serves ZIP Code 39097.

== Notable people ==
- Houston Antwine, former professional football player
- Leon Finney Jr., minister and community organizer
- Hip Linkchain, Chicago blues guitarist
- James D. Montgomery, attorney
- Warren Smith, rockabilly singer
