= National Register of Historic Places listings in Coahoma County, Mississippi =

Location of Coahoma County in Mississippi

This is a list of the National Register of Historic Places listings in Coahoma County, Mississippi.

This is intended to be a complete list of the properties and districts on the National Register of Historic Places in Coahoma County, Mississippi, United States. Latitude and longitude coordinates are provided for many National Register properties and districts; these locations may be seen together in a map.

There are 23 properties and districts listed on the National Register in the county.

This National Park Service list is complete through NPS recent listings posted October 23, 2026.

== Current listings ==
	Name on the Register	Image	Date listed	Location	City or town	Description
1	Barner Site (22CO542)	Barner Site (22CO542)	March 8, 1984 (#84002129)	Address restricted	Clarksdale	
2	Bobo Senior High School Building		March 19, 2008 (#08000196)	131 School St. 34°11′57″N 90°34′43″W	Clarksdale	
3	Carson Mounds		April 19, 1979 (#79003382)	Northeastern quarter of the northwestern quarter of Section 24, Township 28 North, Range 5 West; 34°17′37″N 90°40′17″W	Clarksdale	
4	John Clark House		July 5, 2003 (#03000589)	211 Clark St. 34°12′23″N 90°34′28″W	Clarksdale	
5	Clarksdale Historic District		September 14, 2009 (#09000763)	Roughly bounded by the Sunflower River, 10th St., DeSoto Ave., and Clark St. 34°11′55″N 90°34′10″W	Clarksdale	
6	Coahoma Community College		February 23, 2026 (#100012729)	3240 Friars Point Road; 34°15′21″N 90°34′11″W	Clarksdale vicinity	
7	Rufus Davis Site		June 15, 1978 (#78001597)	Northeastern quarter of the northeastern quarter of Section 5, Township 27 North, Range 4 West; 34°14′54″N 90°37′32″W	Clarksdale	
8	Dickerson Site (22CO502)	Dickerson Site (22CO502)	September 11, 1986 (#86002323)	Address restricted	Friars Point	
9	Friars Point Historic District	Friars Point Historic District	January 28, 1999 (#98001608)	Along 2nd St. 34°22′20″N 90°38′14″W	Friars Point	
10	Humber Site	Humber Site	May 12, 1975 (#75001043)	Address restricted	Farrel	
11	Myrtle Hall Branch Library for Negroes		January 25, 2018 (#100002027)	1109 N. State St. 34°11′44″N 90°33′41″W	Clarksdale	
12	New Alcazar Hotel	New Alcazar Hotel	June 24, 1994 (#94000646)	127 3rd St. 34°12′05″N 90°34′25″W	Clarksdale	
13	Oliver Site		December 30, 1974 (#74001061)	Northwestern quarter of the northwestern quarter of Section 10, Township 25, Range 4 West; 34°03′28″N 90°36′14″W	Clarksdale	
14	Parchman Place Site		May 17, 1973 (#73001005)	Southwestern quarter of the northwestern quarter of Section 30, Township 29 North, Range 3 West; 34°21′34″N 90°33′00″W	Coahoma	
15	Prairie Plantation House		November 10, 1994 (#94001305)	1545 Old River Rd. 34°18′22″N 90°39′12″W	Clarksdale	
16	Salomon (Salmon) Site		March 8, 1984 (#84002134)	Northeastern quarter of the northeastern quarter of Section 22, Township 29 North, Range 3 West; 34°22′39″N 90°29′24″W	Coahoma	
17	Spendthrift Site (22CO520)		September 11, 1986 (#86002330)	Northwestern quarter of the northwestern quarter of Section 13, Township 26 North, Range 3 West; 34°07′44″N 90°27′51″W	Mattson	
18	Sunflower Landing		October 2, 1991 (#91001422)	Address restricted	Rena Lara	
19	Wilsford		December 30, 1974 (#74001062)	Address restricted	Lula	
20	Woolworth Building		March 19, 2009 (#09000110)	207 Yazoo Ave. 34°12′10″N 90°34′25″W	Clarksdale	
21	WROX Building	WROX Building	August 9, 2002 (#02000854)	257 Delta Ave. 34°12′05″N 90°34′29″W	Clarksdale	
22	Yazoo and Mississippi Valley Passenger Depot	Yazoo and Mississippi Valley Passenger Depot	October 31, 1995 (#95001194)	1 Blues Alley; 34°12′03″N 90°34′15″W	Clarksdale	Later the Illinois Central
23	Yazoo Pass Levee		June 19, 1973 (#73001006)	Near Moon Lake on Mississippi Highway 1; 34°26′57″N 90°33′02″W	Moon Lake	

== See also ==
- List of National Historic Landmarks in Mississippi
- National Register of Historic Places listings in Mississippi
