= Cagles Crossing, Mississippi =

- Unincorporated community
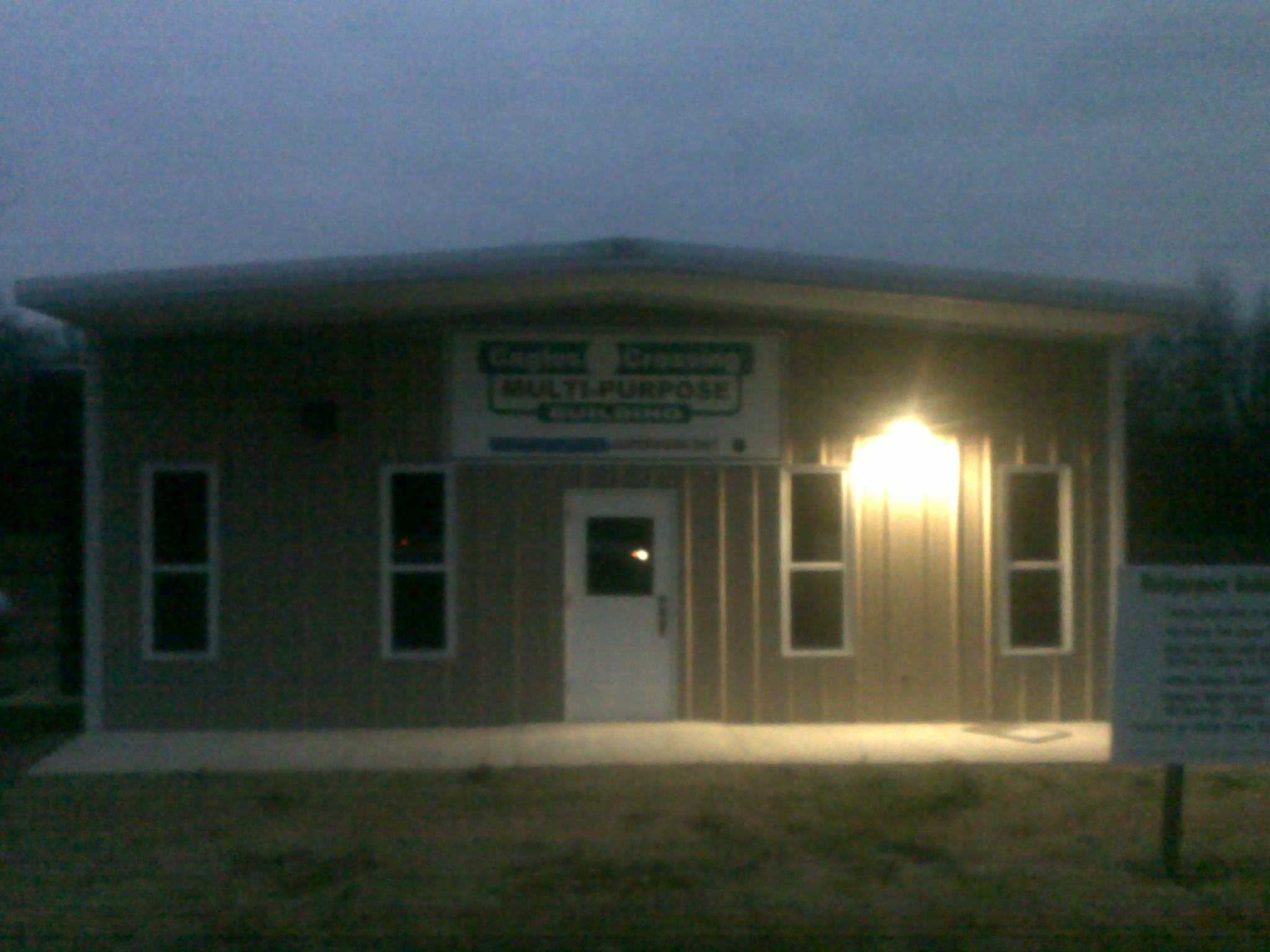
- Cagles Crossing Multi-Purpose Building

- Location within Mississippi Location within the United States
- Coordinates: 34°01′47″N 90°30′13″W
- Country: United States
- State: Mississippi
- County: Coahoma
- Time zone: UTC-6 (Central (CST))
  - Summer (DST): UTC-5 (CDT)
- ZIP code: 38963
- Area code: 662

Cagles Crossing is an unincorporated community located in Coahoma County, Mississippi, United States. Cagles Crossing is located on Dog Walk Road, approximately 4 miles (6.4 km) north of Rome and approximately 5 miles (8.0 km) south of Dublin.

Cagles Crossing is included in the 11th District of Mississippi Circuit Court.
