= Minnie Ball House =

Historic residence in Mississippi

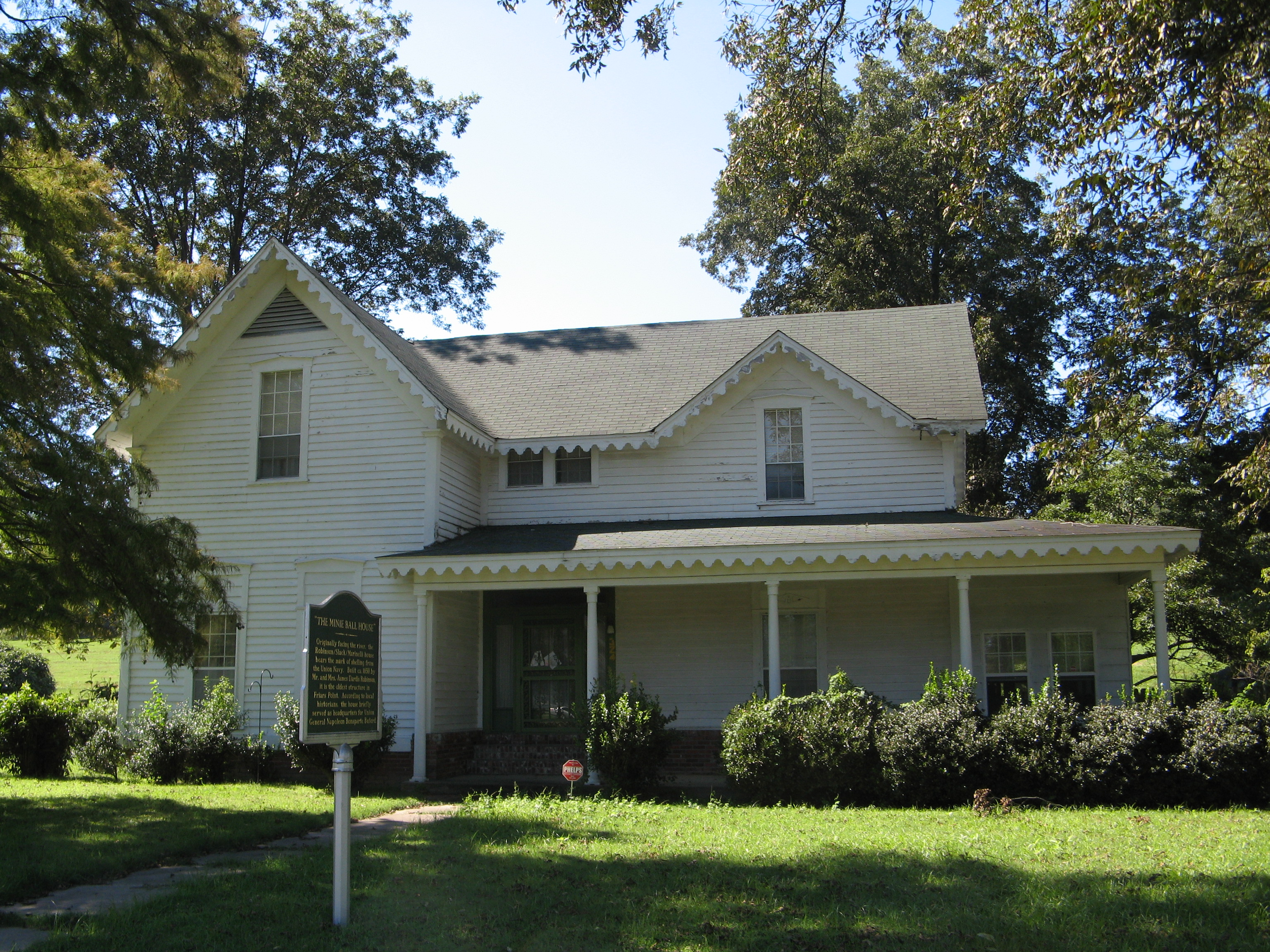

The Minnie Ball House, also known as the Robinson-Slack-Marinelli House, is a historic residence in Friars Point in Coahoma County, Mississippi. It is marked from U.S. Navy shelling during the American Civil War. It is listed on the National Register of Historic Places. A historical marker commemorates its history.

It was built of cypress and red poplar. It had a lookout tower. It was moved around after levee construction. It was occupied by the Union Army during the Civil War.

== See also ==
- National Register of Historic Places listings in Coahoma County, Mississippi
- Minié ball
