= Malcolm Mabry =

American politician (1933–2020)

Member of the Mississippi Senate from the 11th district
- In office January 1980 – January 1988
- Preceded by: William B. Alexander (post 1); Robert L. Crook (post 2)

Member of the Mississippi House of Representatives from the Coahoma County district
- In office January 1964 – January 1980

Personal details
- Born: June 28, 1933 Dublin, Mississippi, US
- Died: June 12, 2020 (aged 86) Clarksdale, Mississippi, US
- Party: Democratic
- Occupation: teacher, farmer, legislator

Malcolm H. Mabry Jr. (June 28, 1933 – June 12, 2020) was an American politician from the state of Mississippi. He served in the Mississippi House of Representatives from 1964 to 1980, representing Coahoma County, and in the Mississippi State Senate from 1980 to 1988, representing the 11th (Coahoma and Tunica Counties) district. He was also a teacher and farmer.
