= Morganfield (surname) =

Morganfield is a surname. Notable people with the surname include:

- Big Bill Morganfield (born 1956), American blues singer and guitarist
- McKinley Morganfield (1913-1983), birth name of blues singer Muddy Waters
- Mud Morganfield (born 1954), American blues singer
- Willie Morganfield (1927–2003), American gospel musician and minister
