= Myrtle Hall Branch Library for Negroes =

Myrtle Hall Branch Library for Negroes is a historic site in Coahoma County, Mississippi. listed on the National Register of Historic Places.

== See also ==
- National Register of Historic Places listings in Coahoma County, Mississippi
