= Claremont, Mississippi =

- Unincorporated community
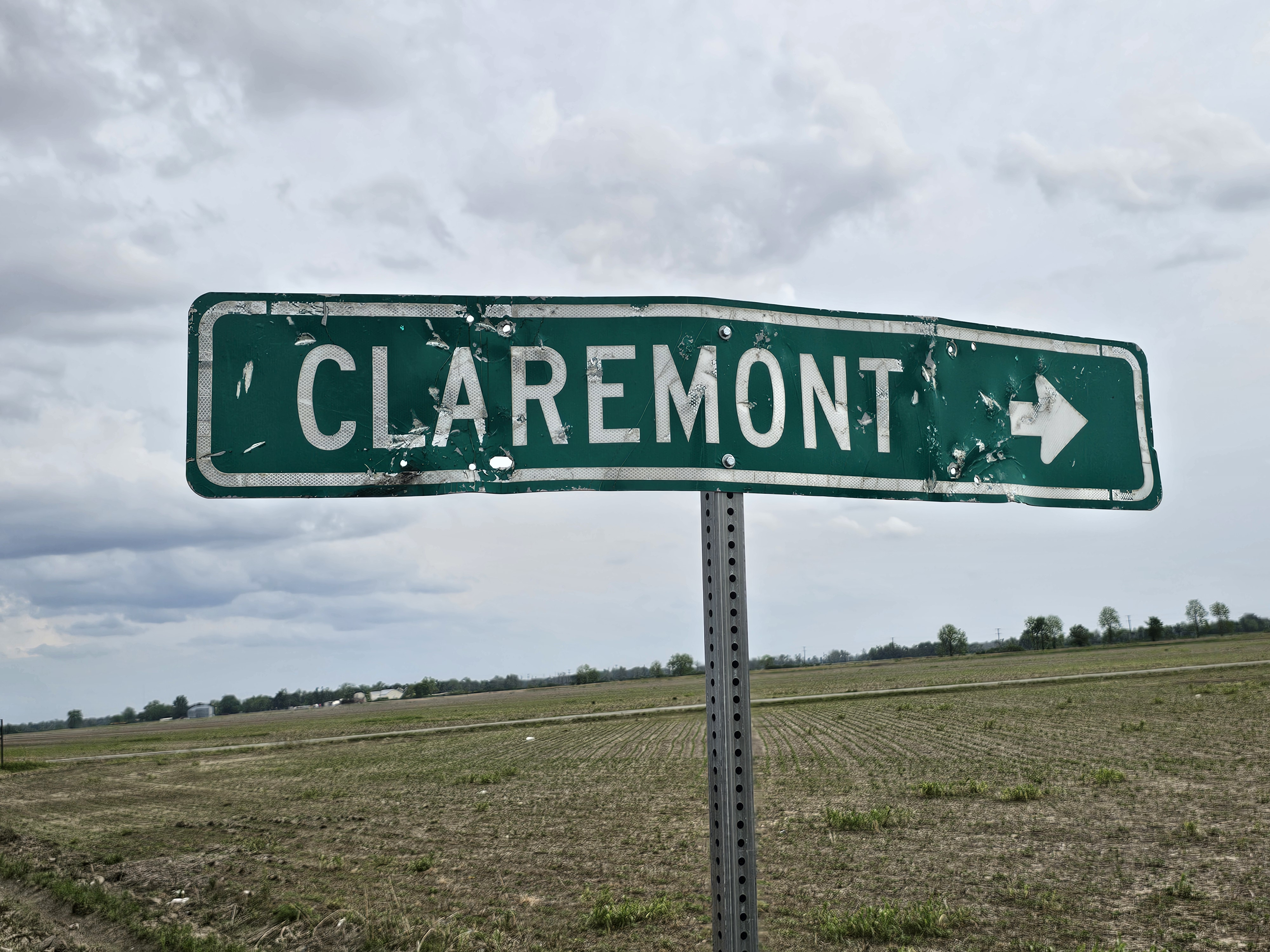
- Highway sign just outside of Claremont

- Location within Mississippi Location within the United States
- Coordinates: 34°07′14″N 90°31′26″W
- Country: United States
- State: Mississippi
- County: Coahoma
- Elevation: 164 ft (50 m)
- Time zone: UTC-6 (Central (CST))
  - Summer (DST): UTC-5 (CDT)
- ZIP code: 38739
- Area code: 662
- GNIS feature ID: 668499

Claremont, (also known as Rose), is an unincorporated community located in Coahoma County, Mississippi, United States. Claremont is approximately 2 miles (3.2 km) north of Mattson and approximately 4 miles (6.4 km) south of Clarksdale. Claremont is located on the former Yazoo and Mississippi Valley Railroad. A post office operated under the name Rose from 1904 to 1905 and under the name Claremont from 1905 to 1932.
