= Moon Lake (Mississippi) =

- Lake
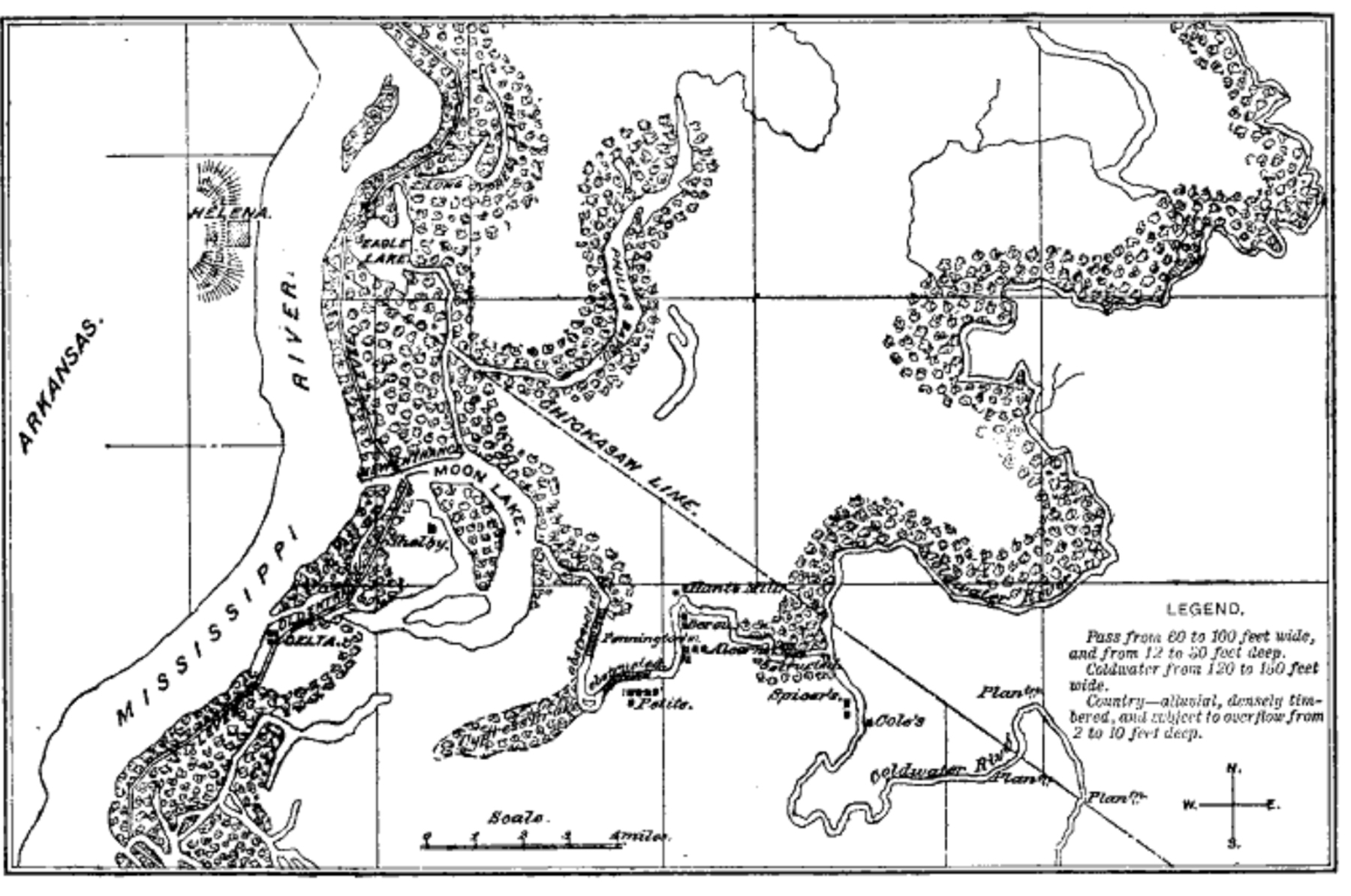
- 1863 map of the area

- Location within Mississippi Location within the United States
- Coordinates: 34°25′34″N 90°30′09″W
- Country: United States
- State: Mississippi
- County: Coahoma
- Elevation: 154 ft (47 m)
- Time zone: UTC-6 (Central (CST))
  - Summer (DST): UTC-5 (CDT)
- Area code: 662
- GNIS feature ID: 673765

Moon Lake is a lake located in Coahoma County, Mississippi, United States. Moon Lake is 3 square miles (8 km^{2}) in size.

The community of Moon Lake is located on the eastern shore.

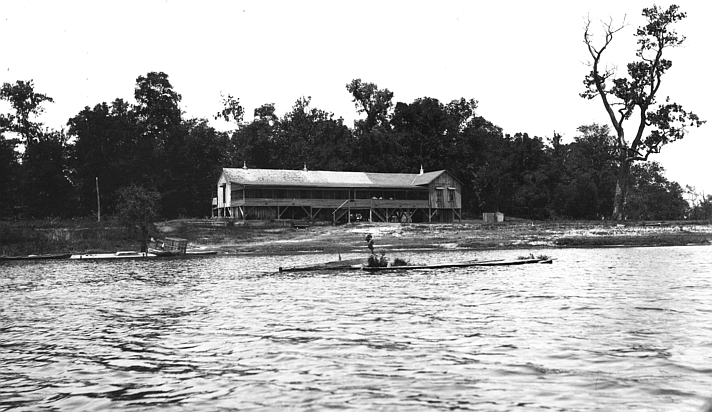
Fishing clubhouse on edge of Moon Lake, circa 1900

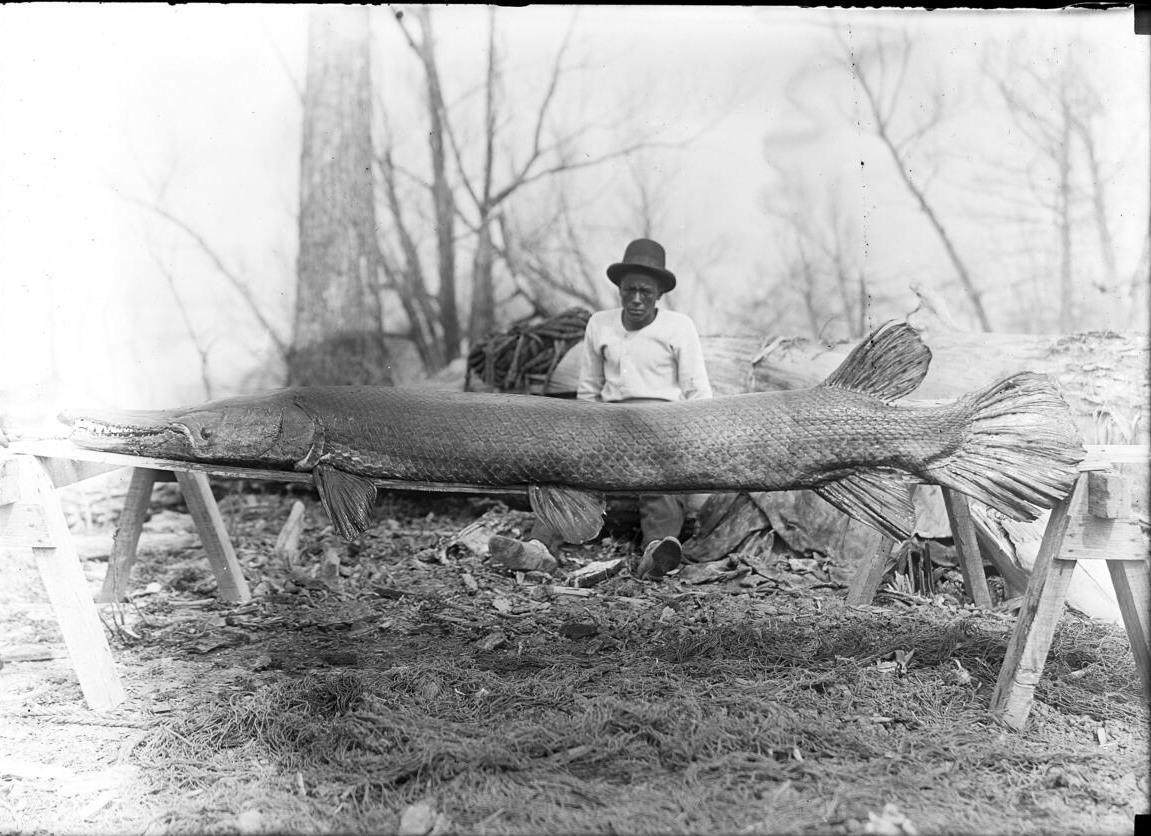
Alligator gar caught in Moon Lake, Mississippi, March 1910
