= Casey Jones (catcher) =

American baseball player (1918-1998)

- Catcher
- Born: July 19, 1918; Dublin, Mississippi, U.S.
- Died: November 17, 1998 (aged 80); Memphis, Tennessee, U.S.
- Batted: Left Threw: Right

Negro league baseball debut
- 1943, for the Memphis Red Sox

Last appearance
- 1955, for the Memphis Red Sox
- Stats at Baseball Reference

Teams
- Memphis Red Sox (1940–1955)

Clinton Casey Jones Jr. (July 19, 1918 – November 17, 1998) was an American Negro league catcher who played for the Memphis Red Sox from 1943 to 1955.

A native of Dublin, Mississippi, Jones broke into the Negro leagues in 1943 with the Memphis Red Sox, and played his entire career with the team. He was selected to play in the East–West All-Star Game in 1950 and 1951, and remained with the Red Sox through the 1955 season. Jones died in Memphis, Tennessee in 1998 at age 80.
