= Stovall, Mississippi =

- Unincorporated community
- Location within Mississippi Location within the United States
- Coordinates: 34°17′48″N 90°38′41″W
- Country: United States
- State: Mississippi
- County: Coahoma
- Elevation: 174 ft (53 m)
- Time zone: UTC-6 (Central (CST))
  - Summer (DST): UTC-5 (CDT)
- ZIP code: 38614
- Area code: 662
- GNIS feature ID: 692248

Stovall, also known as Prarieville, is an unincorporated community in Coahoma County, Mississippi, United States, along Mississippi Highway 1, 7 miles (11 km) north of Sherard and approximately 6 miles (9.7 km) south of Friars Point.

== History ==
Stovall is named after the Stovall family, who owned the land where the railroad depot was located. It is located on the former Yazoo and Mississippi Valley Railroad and in 1910 was home to two general stores. The Stovall Gin Company once operated a cotton gin in Stovall.

Although Stovall is unincorporated, it has a ZIP code of 38614. A post office operated under the name Prarieville from 1878 to 1885 and began operating under the name Stovall in 1885.

Ethnomusicologist Alan Lomax recorded Muddy Waters in 1941 and 1942 in Stovall.

Carson Mounds, a large Mississippian culture archaeological site, is located in Stovall.

== Notable people ==
- Eddie Boyd, blues pianist, singer, and songwriter
- Willie Morganfield, gospel musician and minister
- William Howard Stovall, World War I flying ace, World War II fighter pilot
- Muddy Waters (born McKinley Morganfield), blues singer-songwriter
