= Clover Hill, Mississippi =

- Unincorporated community
- Location within Mississippi Location within the United States
- Coordinates: 34°16′30″N 90°32′39″W
- Country: United States
- State: Mississippi
- County: Coahoma
- Elevation: 131 ft (40 m)
- Time zone: UTC-6 (Central (CST))
  - Summer (DST): UTC-5 (CDT)
- ZIP code: 38645
- Area code: 662
- GNIS feature ID: 691772

Clover Hill is an unincorporated community located in Coahoma County, Mississippi, United States. Clover Hill is approximately 4 miles (6.4 km) north of Lyon and approximately 4 miles (6.4 km) south of Rudyard. The community is located on the former plantation of J. T. Fargason. Clover Hill once had a depot on the former Yazoo and Mississippi Valley Railroad. A post office operated under the name Clover Hill from 1884 to 1935.

The Clover Hill archaeological site is named after the community.
