= D. H. Hopson =

Mississippi politician

D. H. Hopson (born 1859) was a teacher, state legislator, tax assessor, and coroner in Mississippi. He represented Coahoma County in the Mississippi House of Representatives in 1888 as a Democrat.

He was born in 1859 in Coahoma County, Mississippi.

He served as tax assessor in 1884 and as coroner in 1896.

He served with fellow Coahoma representative W. H. Stovall.
