= Ingram, Mississippi =

Unincorporated community in Mississippi, United States

- Former settlement
- Location within Mississippi
- Coordinates: 34°24′55″N 90°23′54″W
- Country: United States
- State: Mississippi
- Counties: Coahoma and Quitman
- Elevation: 171 ft (52 m)
- GNIS feature ID: 710440

Ingram is a former settlement in Coahoma and Quitman counties, Mississippi, United States. Ingram was located near the Coldwater River north of Birdie.
