= Humber, Mississippi =

- Unincorporated community
- Location within Mississippi Location within the United States
- Coordinates: 34°16′50″N 90°42′12″W
- Country: United States
- State: Mississippi
- County: Coahoma
- Elevation: 160 ft (50 m)
- Time zone: UTC-6 (Central (CST))
  - Summer (DST): UTC-5 (CDT)
- GNIS feature ID: 689278

Humber is an unincorporated community in Coahoma County, Mississippi, United States.

Humber had a post office in the early 1900s, and was then located directly on the Mississippi River.

The Humber Archeological Site is located west of Humber on Island No. 63 in the Mississippi River.

The Mississippi Levee now lies between the town and the river.
