= Wildwood, Coahoma County, Mississippi =

Wildwood, Mississippi
- Ghost town
- Location within Mississippi
- Coordinates: 34°22′42″N 90°26′53″W
- Country: United States
- State: Mississippi
- County: Coahoma
- Elevation: 174 ft (53 m)
- Time zone: UTC-6 (Central (CST))
  - Summer (DST): UTC-5 (CDT)
- GNIS feature ID: 689375

Wildwood is a ghost town in Coahoma County, Mississippi, United States.

The settlement was located approximately 4 mi (6.4 km) north of Jonestown. Wildwood was a stop on the Mobile & North Western Railroad, completed in the 1870s. The population in 1900 was 37. In 1905, the post office at Wildwood was discontinued.
