= Hopson, Mississippi =

- Unincorporated community
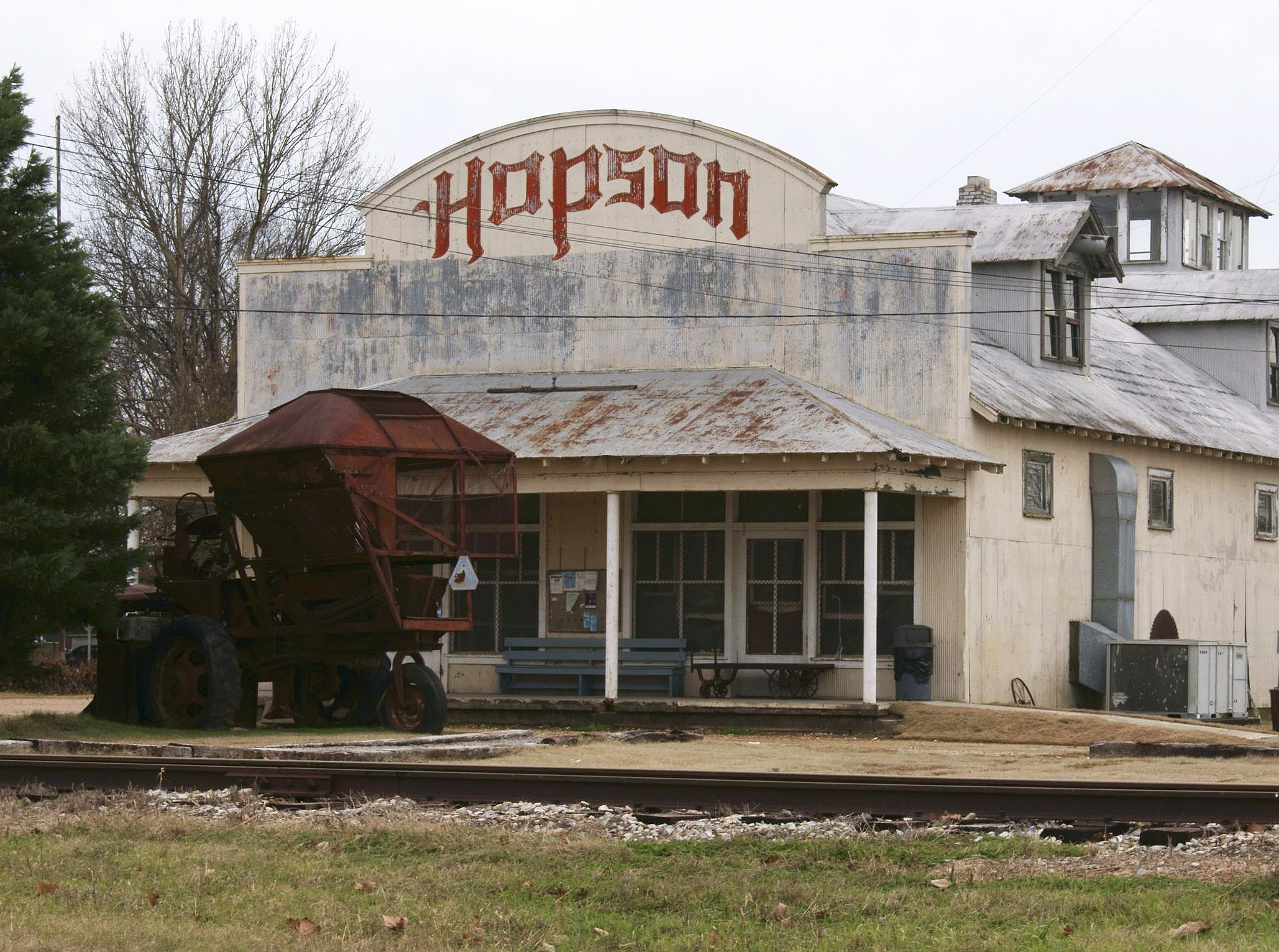
- Hopson Plantation

- Location within Mississippi Location within the United States
- Coordinates: 34°09′31″N 90°32′47″W
- Country: United States
- State: Mississippi
- County: Coahoma
- Elevation: 174 ft (53 m)
- Time zone: UTC-6 (Central (CST))
  - Summer (DST): UTC-5 (CDT)
- ZIP code: 38614
- Area code: 662
- GNIS feature ID: 671454

Hopson (also known as Hopson Plantation or Hopson Spur) is an unincorporated community located in Coahoma County, Mississippi, United States, south of Clarksdale and U.S. Route 61 along U.S. Route 49. Hopson is located on the former Yazoo and Mississippi Valley Railroad. A post office operated under the name Hopson from 1857 to 1867. In 1944 The Hopson Planting Company used International Harvester cotton pickers to harvest cotton, becoming the first farm to mechanically cultivate and produce an entire cotton crop. The former Hopson Plantation Company Store is now operated as a restaurant and music venue.

== Notable person ==
- Pinetop Perkins, blues pianist, worked at Hopson Plantation as a tractor driver

== Gallery ==
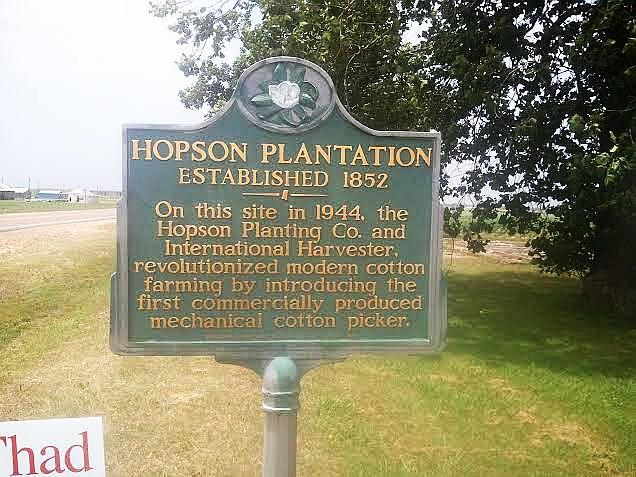
Historical marker in the Hopson community
