= Sunflower Landing, Mississippi =

- Unincorporated community
- Location within Mississippi Location within the United States
- Coordinates: 34°09′58″N 90°48′07″W
- Country: United States
- State: Mississippi
- County: Coahoma
- Elevation: 151 ft (46 m)
- Time zone: UTC-6 (Central (CST))
  - Summer (DST): UTC-5 (CDT)
- GNIS feature ID: 692250

Sunflower Landing is an unincorporated community in Coahoma County, Mississippi, United States.

The settlement is located on the easternmost shore of Desoto Lake, an oxbow lake. Prior to 1942, Desoto Lake was part of the contiguous Mississippi River, and Sunflower Landing was a riverport on the eastern shore of Sunflower Bend.

== History ==
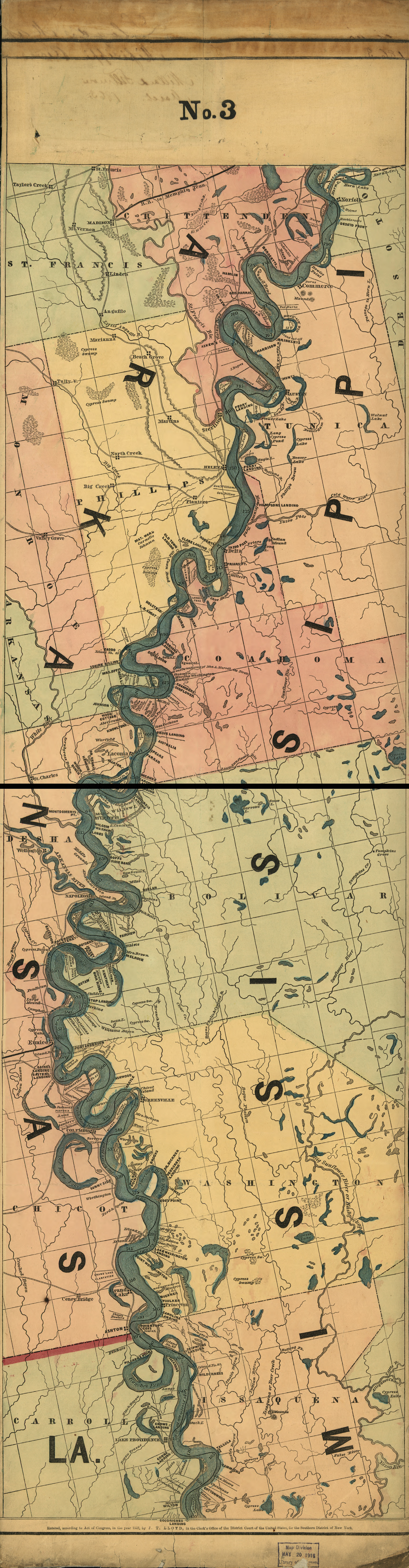
1862 map

A commission appointed by Franklin D. Roosevelt in 1935 determined that Sunflower Landing was the "most likely" place where explorer Hernando de Soto and his expedition crossed the Mississippi River in 1541. It was theorized that de Soto and his men spent a month building flatboats near Sunflower Landing, then crossed the river at night to avoid the Native Americans who were patrolling the river, and with whom de Soto had previously hostile relations. More recent research suggests other Mississippi locations may have also been the site of de Soto's crossing.

By 1838, Sunflower Landing was a well known steamboat landing.

In 1863, the Bolivar Troop, a Confederate States Army company of the First Regiment Mississippi Cavalry, under the command of Frank A. Montgomery, engaged in a land skirmish with about 250 Union troops at Sunflower Landing. Union soldiers had been removing slaves and taking cotton from farms in the vicinity.

A post office operated under the name Sunflower Landing from 1857 to 1892.

In 1942, the United States Army Corps of Engineers removed Sunflower Bend from the course of the Mississippi River. The resulting oxbow lake was named "Desoto Lake".
