= Burke Landing, Mississippi =

Burke Landing
- Unincorporated community
- Location within Mississippi Location within the United States
- Coordinates: 34°16′13″N 90°47′18″W
- Country: United States
- State: Mississippi
- County: Coahoma
- Elevation: 151 ft (46 m)
- Time zone: UTC-6 (Central (CST))
  - Summer (DST): UTC-5 (CDT)
- GNIS feature ID: 691738

Burke Landing is an unincorporated community located on the Mississippi River in Coahoma County, Mississippi, United States.

Burke Landing was formerly home to two churches, a grist mill, and sawmill.

The settlement appeared on a map from 1862.

In 2009, an EF2 tornado touched down in Burke Landing, causing some structural damage.
