= Carson Mounds =

Archeological Site

- Location in Mississippi today
- 34°17′37.4″N 90°40′16.04″W
- Cultures: Mississippian culture
- Location: Stovall, Mississippi, USA
- Region: Coahoma County, Mississippi

Site notes
- Architectural styles: platform mounds, plazas
- Carson Mounds
- U.S. National Register of Historic Places
- U.S. National Historic Landmark
- Area: 186 acres (75 ha)
- NRHP reference No.: 79003382
- Added to NRHP: April 19, 1979

The Carson Mounds (22 CO 505), also known as the Carson Site and Carson-Montgomery- is a large Mississippian culture archaeological site located near Clarksdale in Coahoma County, Mississippi, United States, in the Yazoo Basin. Only a few large earthen mounds are still present at Carson to this day. Archaeologists have suggested that Carson is one of the more important archaeological sites in the state of Mississippi.

== History ==
=== Site chronology ===
Culture	Natchez Bluffs phases	Yazoo Basin phases	Dates	Carson phases	Dates
Historic era	Natchez	Russell (Tunica)	1650–1750	Oliver	1650–1730
Plaquemine/ Mississippian	Emerald	Wasp Lake	1500–1650	Parchman	1550–1650
Plaquemine/ Mississippian	Foster	Lake George	1350–1500	Hushpuckena II	1450–1550
Plaquemine/ Mississippian	Anna	Winterville	1200–1350	Hushpuckena I	1350–1450

=== Prehistory ===
Radiocarbon dating has shown the site was occupied as early as 1040 CE with the large earthen monuments and villages being constructed at the site after 1200 CE, and significant occupation spanning 1420 to 1660 CE.

=== Protohistory ===
Archaeologists suggest that Carson is important because it was either near or part of one of the indigenous polities encountered by the expedition of Hernando de Soto, the earliest European explorers of the southeastern United States in the early 1540s. There is no physical evidence that Carson was visited by de Soto or his men during their westward trek. However, they did pass at the very least within 50 kilometres (31 mi) – 75 kilometres (47 mi) of Carson when they traveled down the Mississippi River in July 1543. Some archaeologists and historians have located the polity of Quizquiz encountered by de Soto in the general location of the Carson site and its neighbors and the polity of Quigualtam being centered further downstream at the Emerald Phase (1500–1680) of the protohistoric Natchez chiefdom in the Natchez Bluffs region. Others have suggested a more northerly location for Quizquiz at the Walls phase sites near Memphis, Tennessee. Along with the introduction of Eurasian diseases, the social disruptions caused by de Soto and his men caused native polities to fragment and fall apart. No further European contact with the area happened until the late 1600s when French missionaries and explorers entered the region both downriver from Canada and upriver from the Gulf of Mexico, by which time the paramount chiefdoms recorded by de Soto had vanished.

=== Historic period ===
Carson was first visited by early scientific explorers and archaeologists in the late nineteenth century, including surveyors for the Smithsonian's Bureau of American Ethnology, Col. Philetus W. Norris and William Henry Holmes. The site was located on the Oasis Plantation owned by the Carson family and a map of the landscape and mounds was published in 1894 in the 12th Annual Report to the Bureau of American Ethnology by Cyrus Thomas. Subsequent researchers to visit the site include the Harvard LMS survey, Ian Brown, Jay K. Johnson, John Connaway, and Jayur Madhusudan Mehta.

This map, in addition to research by archaeologists, established the significant scale of settlement at the site. The mounds stretch across an expanse of land over 1.6 kilometres (0.99 mi) in length. In the greater pantheon of Mississippian culture sites, Carson is quite large, and it was incredibly important in local and regional political dynamics.

The Carson Mounds site was listed on the National Register of Historic Places in 1979.

The mounds are listed on the Mississippi Mound Trail.

== Location and geography ==
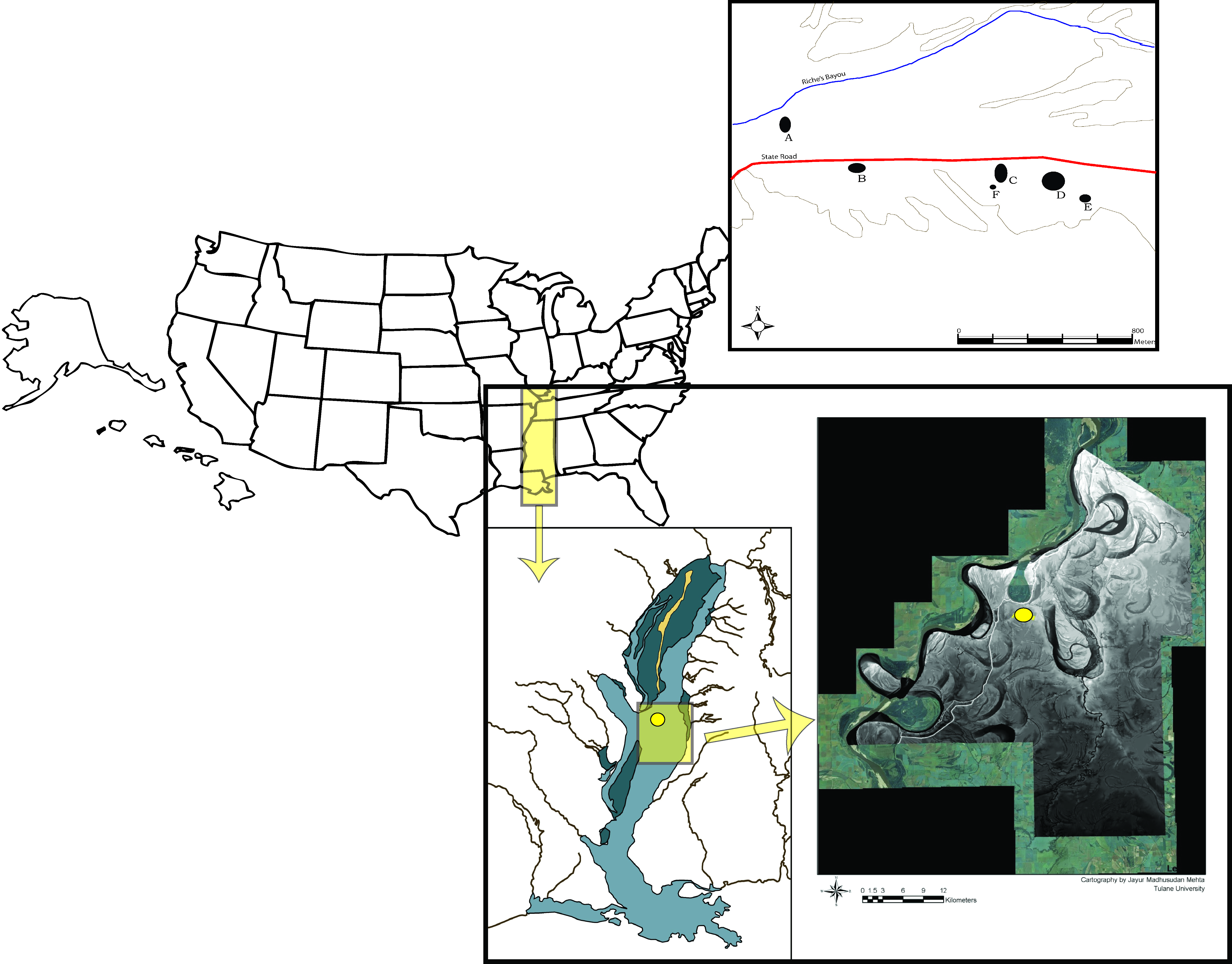
Location of Carson

Carson is located in the northern Yazoo Basin, approximately 500 kilometres (310 mi) north from the Gulf of Mexico and 120 kilometres (75 mi) south from Memphis, Tennessee. The Yazoo Basin is a floodplain of the Mississippi River and features a variety of geomorphic features created by meandering channels of the Mississippi River over the last several thousand years. Carson and the mounds were constructed over a crevasse splay which was deposited by the Mississippi River around 2800 years ago.

=== Site layout ===
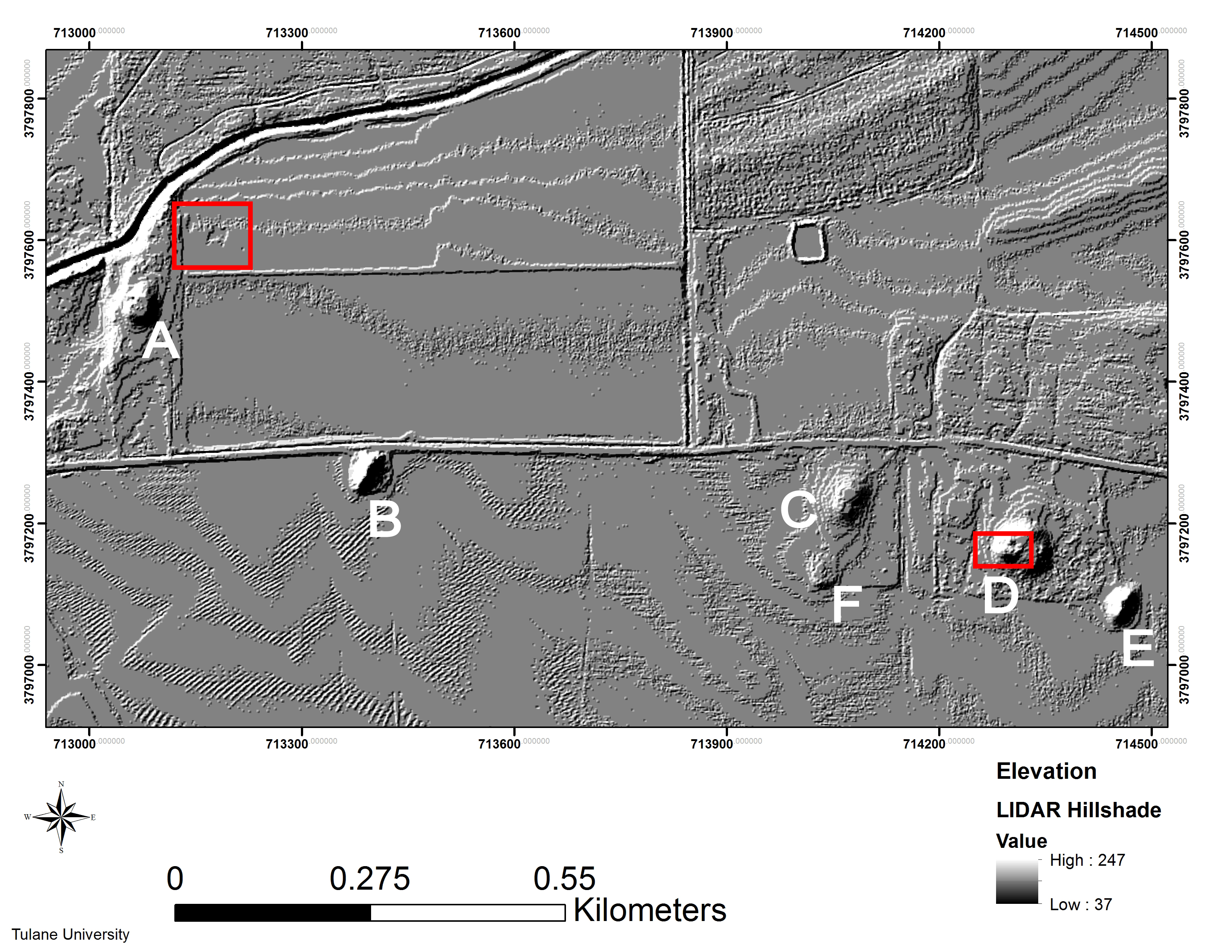
LiDAR Hillshade of Carson

The Mississippian culture component of Carson extends east to west approximately 1.5 miles (2.4 km) and north to south 0.5 miles (0.80 km) and covers approximately 150 acres (0.61 km^{2}). When it was first documented in 1894 there were over eighty small earthen mounds scattered across the site; a number only exceeded by the Cahokia site in western Illinois. Due to extensive Euroamerican farming techniques since this time, most of these small mounds have been leveled and are no longer visible. The site is presently dominated by five large platform mounds, some of which form arrangements around central plazas.

These remaining mounds, named Mounds A-F, range in size from 3 metres (9.8 ft) and 12 metres (39 ft) in height. Adjacent to Mound A, there was a large enclosed village where archaeologists have currently recovered well over 30 residential buildings. This 5 acres (0.020 km^{2}) area, located in the northwestern corner of the site, was enclosed on three sides by an earthen embankment and ditch, and on its fourth side by a river.

== Culture ==
Excavations have produced evidence of flint-knapping, the production of stone tools, some of which are consistent with blades and drills found at other major Mississippian mound centers including Cahokia and Bottle Creek Indian Mounds. Other evidence of interaction with Cahokia comes in the form of the characteristically Cahokian Ramey Incised vessels which have been found at Carson. Examples of these vessels can be seen at the Carnegie Public Library in Clarksdale, Mississippi.

Examination of human remains found in burials at Carson has also shown that the inhabitants practiced artificial cranial deformation or head flattening. The specific type of deformation is defined as fronto-occipital or fronto-vertico-occipital, the flattening of the forehead and the back of the head. This particular type of body modification is more complex than cranial modification as a byproduct of simply "cradle boarding" infants, and is thought to have been purposely done to show the hereditary elite status of the individuals; since the modifications are made in very early childhood before an elite status could have been gained in other ways.
