= Lurand, Mississippi =

- Unincorporated community
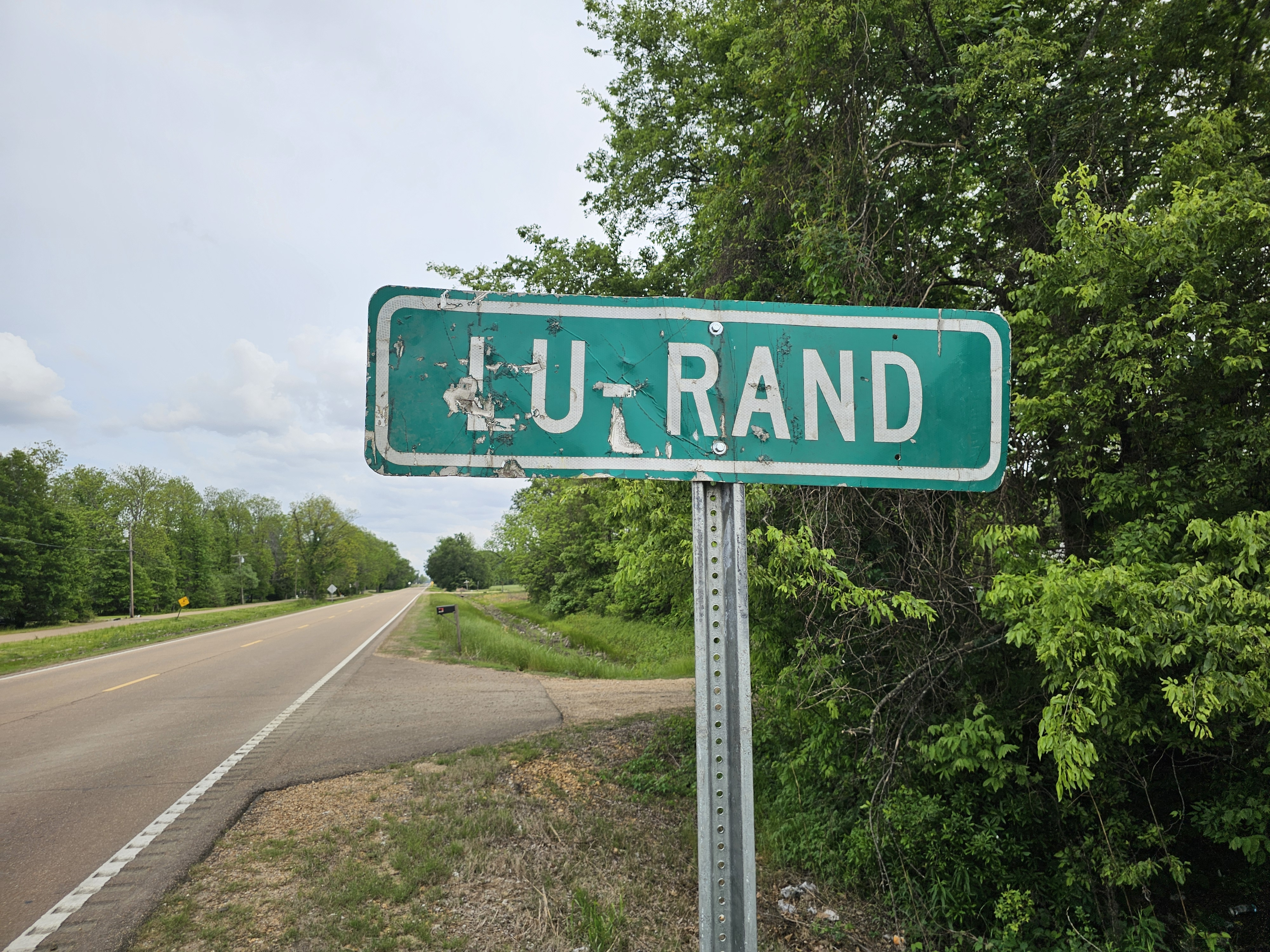
- Lu-Rand Highway Sign on U.S. Route 49.

- Location within Mississippi Location within the United States
- Coordinates: 34°08′09″N 90°31′40″W
- Country: United States
- State: Mississippi
- County: Coahoma
- Elevation: 157 ft (48 m)
- Time zone: UTC-6 (Central (CST))
  - Summer (DST): UTC-5 (CDT)
- Area code: 662
- GNIS feature ID: 672960

Lurand is an unincorporated community located on U.S. Route 49 in Coahoma County, Mississippi, United States. Lurand is 2 miles (3.2 km) south of Clarksdale.
