= Pepper Sharpe =

American baseball player

- Pitcher
- Born: December 9, 1918; Rena Lara, Mississippi, U.S.
- Died: December 4, 1997 (aged 78); San Diego, California, U.S.

Negro league baseball debut
- 1943, for the Memphis Red Sox

Last appearance
- 1948, for the Memphis Red Sox

Teams
- Memphis Red Sox (1943–1944); Chicago American Giants (1944); Memphis Red Sox (1947–1948)

Robert Ernest Sharpe (December 9, 1918 – December 4, 1997), nicknamed "Pepper", was an American Negro league pitcher for the Memphis Red Sox and Chicago American Giants in the 1940s.

A native of Rena Lara, Mississippi, Sharpe was the oldest of 12 children. His career highlights included a no-hitter against the Kansas City Monarchs. Sharpe served in the US Army in 1945 and 1946, and was honored by the city of San Diego, California in 1994, as June 24 was proclaimed "Robert 'Pepper' Sharpe Day". He died in San Diego in 1997 at age 78.
