= Big George Brock =

American blues musician (1932–2020)

- Born: George Brock; May 16, 1932; Grenada, Mississippi, U.S.
- Died: April 10, 2020 (aged 87) St. Louis, Missouri, U.S.
- Occupation: Musician
- Instrument: Harmonica
- Formerly of: Muddy Waters; Howlin' Wolf; Albert King

George Brock (May 16, 1932 – April 10, 2020), billed as Big George Brock, was an American blues musician. A native of Mississippi, he moved to Missouri in the 1950s and operated a series of nightclubs. He played alongside Muddy Waters, Howlin' Wolf, Jimmy Reed, and Albert King. Brock starred in the 2006 film Hard Times, a documentary about his life.

== Life and career ==
Brock was born in Grenada, Mississippi on May 16, 1932. By the time he was eight, he was working as a sharecropper picking cotton. Brock was surrounded by blues music, and recalled, "the blues grew like grass out of the ground." His father taught him and his brothers how to play harmonica as a child.

As a teenager he moved to Mattson, Mississippi. There he met Muddy Waters, and they performed together on weekends. In the late 1940s he moved to Walls, Mississippi. While working as a pipeliner on Highway 61, Brock met Howlin' Wolf. He became his roadie and performed with him. Brock also met Memphis Minnie in Walls and jammed with her at house parties.

Brock moved to St. Louis in 1950 where he was an amateur boxer for a while. In 1952, boxer Sonny Liston was training at a gym alongside Brock. Liston challenged Brock to sparring match. Brock won the fight in the second round, recalling that "he'd just come out of the pen. He thought he was pretty tough." He focused on his music career because it was more lucrative, forming his own band Big George & the Houserockers. Blues guitarist Albert King played in Brock's band before forming his own.

In 1952, Brock opened his own nightclub, Club Caravan, near North Garrison and Franklin avenues. Brock worked as a bouncer and performed there with his band which at times featured King, Big Baddy Smitty, or Riley Coatie on lead guitar. The club hosted acts such as Howlin' Wolf, Muddy Waters, Ike & Tina Turner, and Jimmy Reed.

In the early 1960s, Muddy Waters arranged for him to meet with the executives of Chess Records. Brock turned down the record deal because although he was offered a tour bus and proceeds from the shows, he wouldn't have received any royalties from his recordings. He continued playing the club circuit, at one point he owned as many as three nightclubs at once. Brock closed the Club Caravan after his wife was killed during a shooting incident in 1970. He opened another Club Caravan at Delmar Boulevard and Taylor Avenue, but that closed in the late 1980s.

In 2005, Brock signed to the label Cat Head Delta Blues & Folk Art. He put out the album Club Caravan which received favorable reviews and a Blues Music Award nomination for best comeback album. In 2006 he released the album Round Two, which received three Blues Music Award nominations. Also in 2006, Brock was featured in a documentary about his life titled Hard Times. In the film he visits the plantations where he worked as a child in Mississippi.

In 2017, Brock was honored with a special concert at the National Blues Museum in St. Louis. Brock toured overseas in England, Italy, Switzerland and France. He continued to perform and regularly headlined various blues festivals, including the Bluesweek Festival and the Big Muddy Blues Festival.

== Personal life ==
Brock was married three times and claimed to have 42 children. He died after a long illness at home in St. Louis on April 10, 2020, at the age of 87. In 2021 the Killer Blues Headstone Project placed a headstone for George Brock at Laurel Hill Cemetery in St. Louis.

== Discography ==
=== Albums ===
- 1987: Should Have Been There (self-released)
- 1999: I Got To Keep My Bedroom Door Locked (self-released)
- 1999: Front Door Man (Tee-Ti)
- 2005: Club Caravan (Cat Head Delta Blues & Folk Art, Inc.) – Big George Brock & The Houserockers
- 2006: Round Two (Cat Head Delta Blues & Folk Art, Inc.)
- 2006: Hard Times (Cat Head Delta Blues & Folk Art, Inc.)
- 2007: Live At Seventy Five (Cat Head Delta Blues & Folk Art, Inc.)
- 2007: Heavyweight Blues (APO Records)
