= Willie Morganfield =

American singer-songwriter

- Also known as: Rev. Willie Morganfield
- Born: Willie Morgan Fields; July 11, 1927; Stovall, Mississippi
- Died: October 18, 2003 (aged 76) Clarksdale, Mississippi
- Genres: Gospel, traditional black gospel
- Occupations: Singer, songwriter, minister
- Instruments: Vocals, singer-songwriter, piano
- Years active: 1959–2003
- Labels: Jewel, Paula

Reverend Willie Morganfield (July 11, 1927 – October 18, 2003), was an American gospel musician and minister. He started his music career, in 1959, with the release of a single, "What Is This?", which was made into a popular arrangement by the gospel music singer and pastor Walter Hawkins in 1980. His albums were primarily released by Jewel Records with a few by Paul Records. The only release that charted, Golden Hits, was released by Jewel in 1984, and this placed on the Billboard magazine Gospel Albums chart.

== Early life ==
Morganfield was born on July 11, 1927, in Stovall, Mississippi. He was raised in Memphis, Tennessee, by a father who preached at King Solomon's Church. He was the pastor of Bell Grove Baptist Church of Clarksdale, Mississippi, until his death.

He was a cousin of McKinley Morganfield, better known as the blues musician Muddy Waters, who also lived on the Stovall plantation.

== Music career ==
His music recording career commenced with the single, "What Is This?", that became a gospel music standard, the likes of Brother Joe May would go on to record another version of the song already popular with gospel music radio stations at the time being the most played track. He released albums primarily with Jewel Records with a few released by Paula Records. The album, "Golden Hits" in 1984 with Jewel Records, was the only release to chart on a Billboard magazine list of the Gospel Albums, where it placed at No. 34.

== Personal life ==
Reverend Willie Morganfield was married to Jane Anna Morganfield. Together, they were parents to Cassandra, Reginald, Delories, and Theresa Morganfield. Their grandchildren include Cynthia Williams, Tiffany Williams, Tanesha Williams, Regina Chambers and Cory Williams. Their great-grandchildren include Rayshun Williams and Jayden Williams. Reverend Morganfield died in Memphis, Tennessee, on October 18, 2003, of a sudden cardiac arrest.

== Discography ==
List of selected studio albums, with selected chart positions
Title	Album details	Peak chart positions
Title	Album details	US Gos
Golden Hits	Released: 1984; Label: Jewel; CD, digital download	34
