= Rena Lara, Mississippi =

- Census-designated place
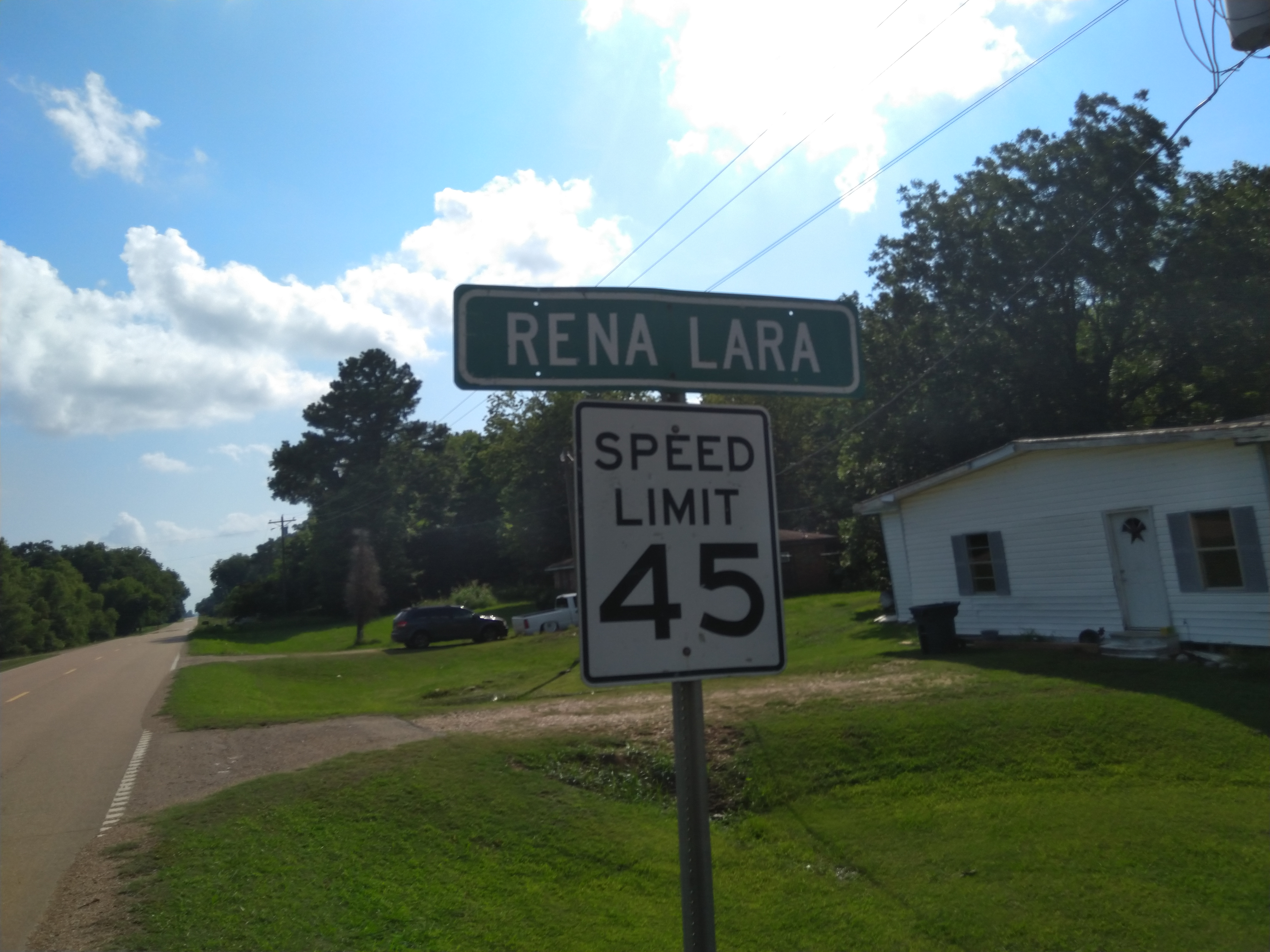
- Sign in the town of Rena Lara

- Location within Mississippi Location within the United States
- Coordinates: 34°08′59″N 90°46′49″W
- Country: United States
- State: Mississippi
- County: Coahoma

Area
  - Total: 2.29 sq mi (5.94 km^{2})
  - Land: 2.29 sq mi (5.94 km^{2})
  - Water: 0 sq mi (0.00 km^{2})
- Elevation: 154 ft (47 m)

Population (2020)
  - Total: 123
  - Density: 53.7/sq mi (20.72/km^{2})
- Time zone: UTC-6 (Central (CST))
  - Summer (DST): UTC-5 (CDT)
- Area code: 662
- GNIS feature ID: 2812719

Rena Lara is a census-designated place (CDP) and unincorporated community located along Mississippi Highway 1 in southwestern Coahoma County, Mississippi, United States. Rena Lara is located on the former Riverside Division of the Yazoo and Mississippi Valley Railroad. Rena Lara was once home to two general stores, two grocery stores, and the Richardson and May Land & Planting Company.

it has a post office, with the ZIP code 38767. The post office first began operation in 1895.

Pepper Sharpe, a Negro league pitcher, was born in Rena Lara.

Per the 2020 Census, the population was 123.

== Demographics ==
Historical population
Census	Pop.	Note	%±
2020	123		—
U.S. Decennial Census; 2020

Rena Lara was first listed as a census designated place in the 2020 U.S. census.

=== 2020 census ===
Rena Lara CDP, Mississippi – Racial and ethnic composition Note: the US Census treats Hispanic/Latino as an ethnic category. This table excludes Latinos from the racial categories and assigns them to a separate category. Hispanics/Latinos may be of any race.
Race / Ethnicity (NH = Non-Hispanic)	Pop 2020	% 2020
White alone (NH)	102	82.93%
Black or African American alone (NH)	13	10.57%
Native American or Alaska Native alone (NH)	0	0.00%
Asian alone (NH)	0	0.00%
Pacific Islander alone (NH)	0	0.00%
Some Other Race alone (NH)	0	0.00%
Mixed Race or Multi-Racial (NH)	7	5.69%
Hispanic or Latino (any race)	1	0.81%
Total	123	100.00%
