= Moon Lake, Mississippi =

- Unincorporated community
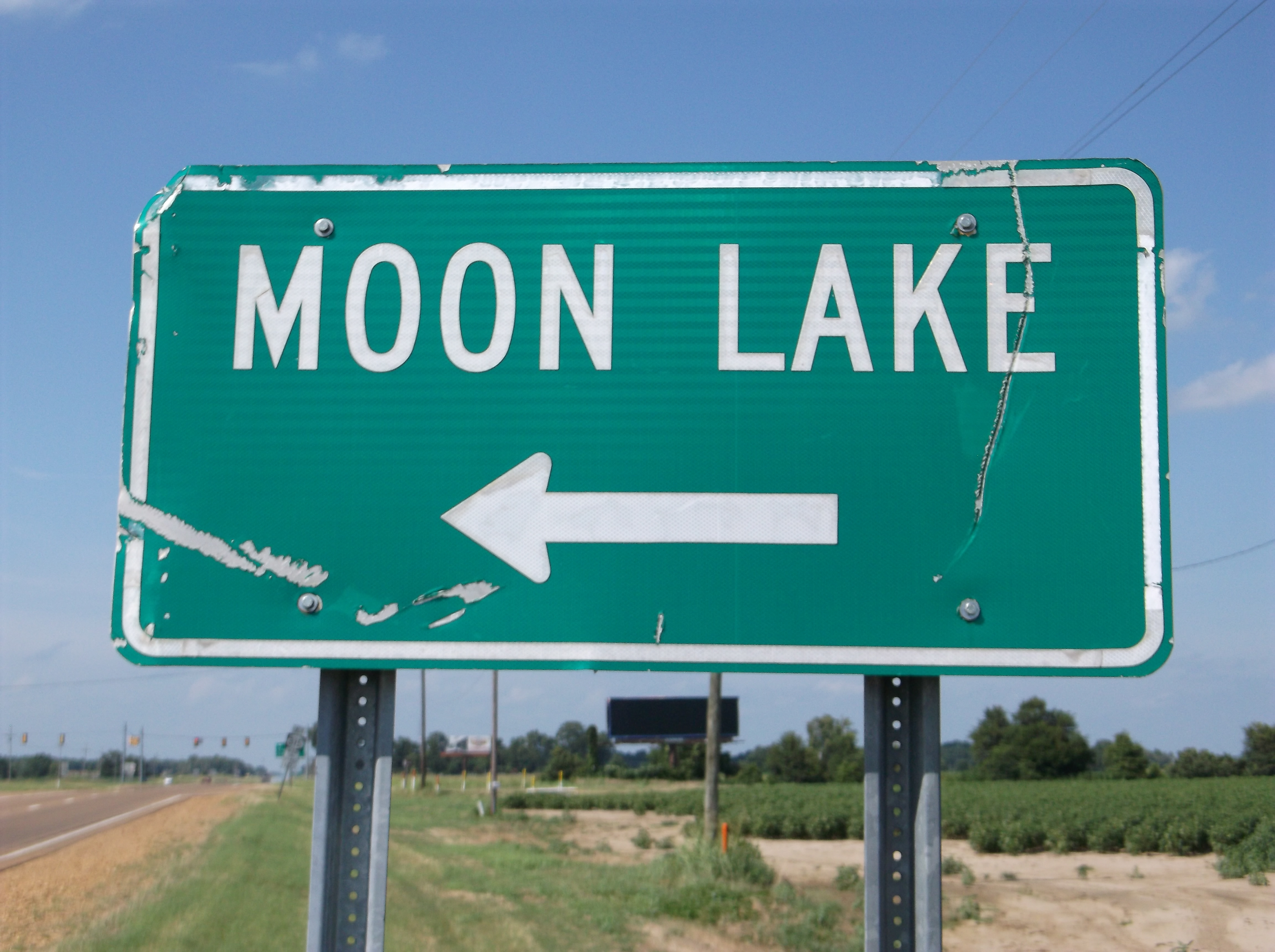
- Highway sign outside of Moon Lake located on US Highway 61

- Location within Mississippi Location within the United States
- Coordinates: 34°26′24″N 90°29′43″W
- Country: United States
- State: Mississippi
- County: Coahoma
- Elevation: 174 ft (53 m)
- Time zone: UTC-6 (Central (CST))
  - Summer (DST): UTC-5 (CDT)
- ZIP code: 38644
- Area code: 662
- GNIS feature ID: 689308

Moon Lake is an unincorporated community located in Coahoma County, Mississippi, United States. Moon Lake is approximately 3 miles (4.8 km) south of Lula and approximately 4 miles (6.4 km) north of Coahoma.

The community of Moon Lake is located along Moon Lake.

== Moon Lake Casino ==
In 1926, the Clarksdale Elks Club built a lodge on Moon Lake.

The property changed ownership in 1936, and the Moon Lake Casino was opened there.

Tennessee Williams visited Moon Lake Casino, and referred to it in all but two of his plays.

Yes, the three of us drove out to Moon Lake Casino, very drunk and laughing all the way.

— Blanche DuBois, A Streetcar Named Desire

Sarah Wright, who has owned the property since 1985, stated, "they loved to go to the Moon Lake Casino, because the place served Kansas City steaks and even flew in lobster from Maine, no easy task as airplane travel was then in its infancy. That was Tennessee's introduction to this place."

William Faulkner also visited the place, and referred to it in one of his novels as "Moon Lake Hotel."

Other writers and musicians, including John Faulkner and W.C. Handy, also visited and wrote about the property.

In 1946, new owners named it "Uncle Henry's Place."

A historic marker was placed there in 2008 by the Mississippi Department of Archives and History.
