= Mattson, Mississippi =

- Unincorporated community
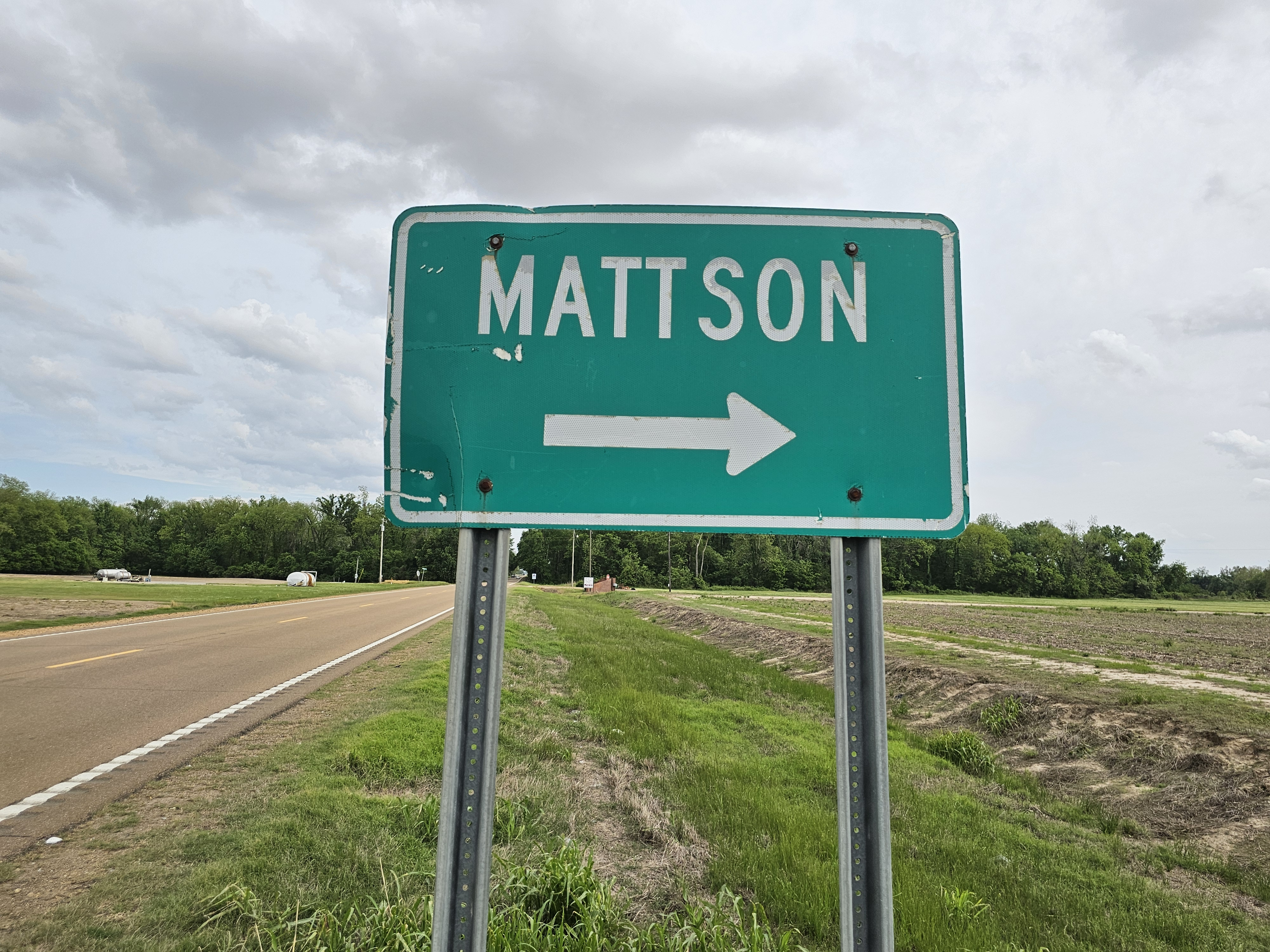
- Highway sign just outside of Mattson

- Location within Mississippi Location within the United States
- Coordinates: 34°05′52″N 90°30′36″W
- Country: United States
- State: Mississippi
- County: Coahoma
- Elevation: 160 ft (50 m)
- Time zone: UTC-6 (Central (CST))
  - Summer (DST): UTC-5 (CDT)
- Area code: 662
- GNIS feature ID: 673246

Mattson, also known as Earnest, is an unincorporated community located near U.S. Route 49 in Coahoma County, Mississippi, United States.

Mattson is 8 miles (13 km) south of Clarksdale and 2 miles (3.2 km) north of Dublin.

== History ==
Mattson is named after a local family that owned a large sawmill in the area. Mattson is located at a junction of the former Yazoo and Mississippi Valley Railroad. A post office operated under the name Earnest from 1887 to 1897 and first began operation under the name Mattson in 1897. A drug store operated by T. R. Montgomery formerly operated in Mattson.

== Notable people ==
- Big George Brock, blues harmonica player
- Clayton Love, blues pianist, bandleader, singer

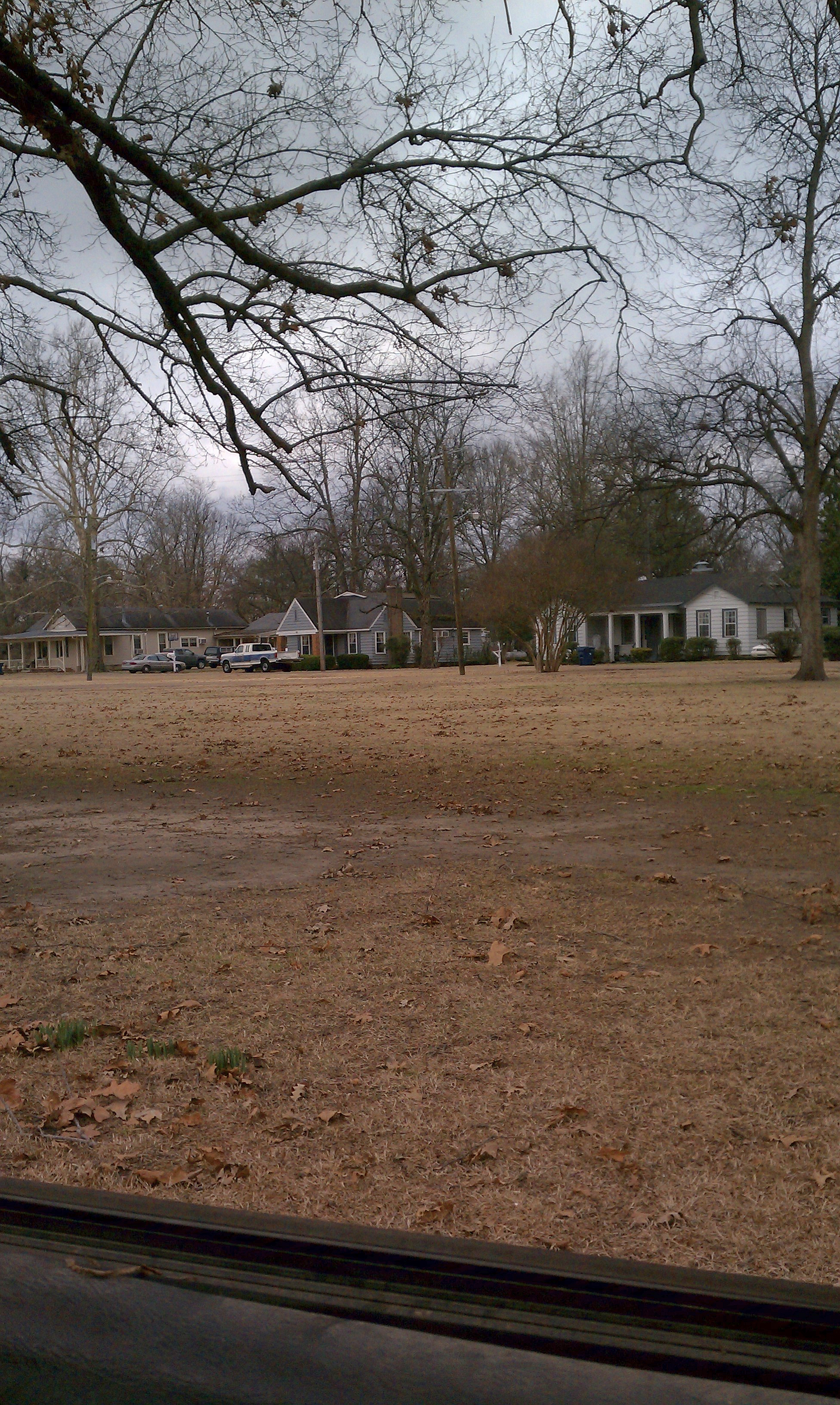
Homes in the Mattson community along Old Highway 61.
