= Dublin, Mississippi =

- Census-designated place
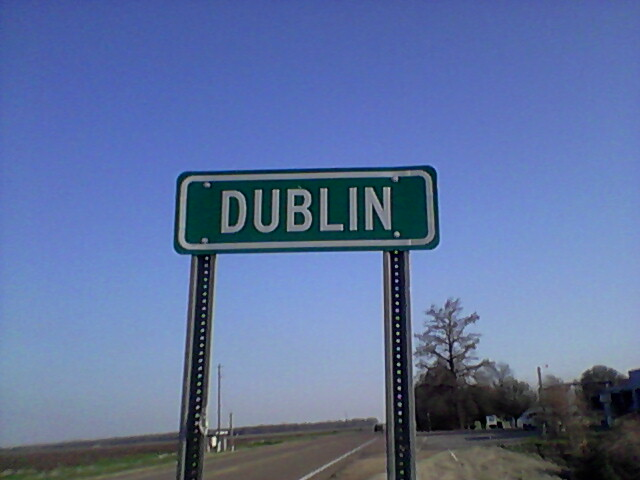
- Dublin sign on U.S. Route 49

- Location within Mississippi Location within the United States
- Coordinates: 34°04′20″N 90°29′26″W
- Country: United States
- State: Mississippi
- County: Coahoma

Area
  - Total: 0.27 sq mi (0.69 km^{2})
  - Land: 0.27 sq mi (0.69 km^{2})
  - Water: 0 sq mi (0.00 km^{2})
- Elevation: 157 ft (48 m)

Population (2020)
  - Total: 24
  - Density: 89.8/sq mi (34.68/km^{2})
- Time zone: UTC-6 (Central (CST))
  - Summer (DST): UTC-5 (CDT)
- GNIS feature ID: 2812717

Dublin, also known as Hopson Bayou, is a census-designated place and unincorporated community located along U.S. Route 49 in southeastern Coahoma County, Mississippi, United States. Dublin is located on the Mississippi Delta Railroad. Dublin has a ZIP code of 38739. A post office first began operation under the name Dublin in 1875.

Per the 2020 Census, the population was 24.

== Demographics ==
Historical population
Census	Pop.	Note	%±
2020	24		—
U.S. Decennial Census; 2020

Dublin was first listed as a census designated place in the 2020 U.S. census.

=== 2020 census ===
Dublin CDP, Mississippi – Racial and ethnic composition Note: the US Census treats Hispanic/Latino as an ethnic category. This table excludes Latinos from the racial categories and assigns them to a separate category. Hispanics/Latinos may be of any race.
Race / Ethnicity (NH = Non-Hispanic)	Pop 2020	% 2020
White alone (NH)	21	87.50%
Black or African American alone (NH)	2	8.33%
Native American or Alaska Native alone (NH)	0	0.00%
Asian alone (NH)	0	0.00%
Native Hawaiian or Pacific Islander alone (NH)	0	0.00%
Other race alone (NH)	0	0.00%
Mixed race or Multiracial (NH)	1	4.17%
Hispanic or Latino (any race)	0	0.00%
Total	24	100.00%

== Notable people ==
- Jimmy Burns, soul blues and electric blues guitarist, singer and songwriter
- Little Willy Foster (1922 – 1987) was a Chicago blues musician, who was born in Dublin.
- Aaron Henry, Civil rights leader
- Malcolm Mabry, former member of the Mississippi House of Representatives and Mississippi Senate
