= Coahoma County, Mississippi =

County in Mississippi, United States

- County
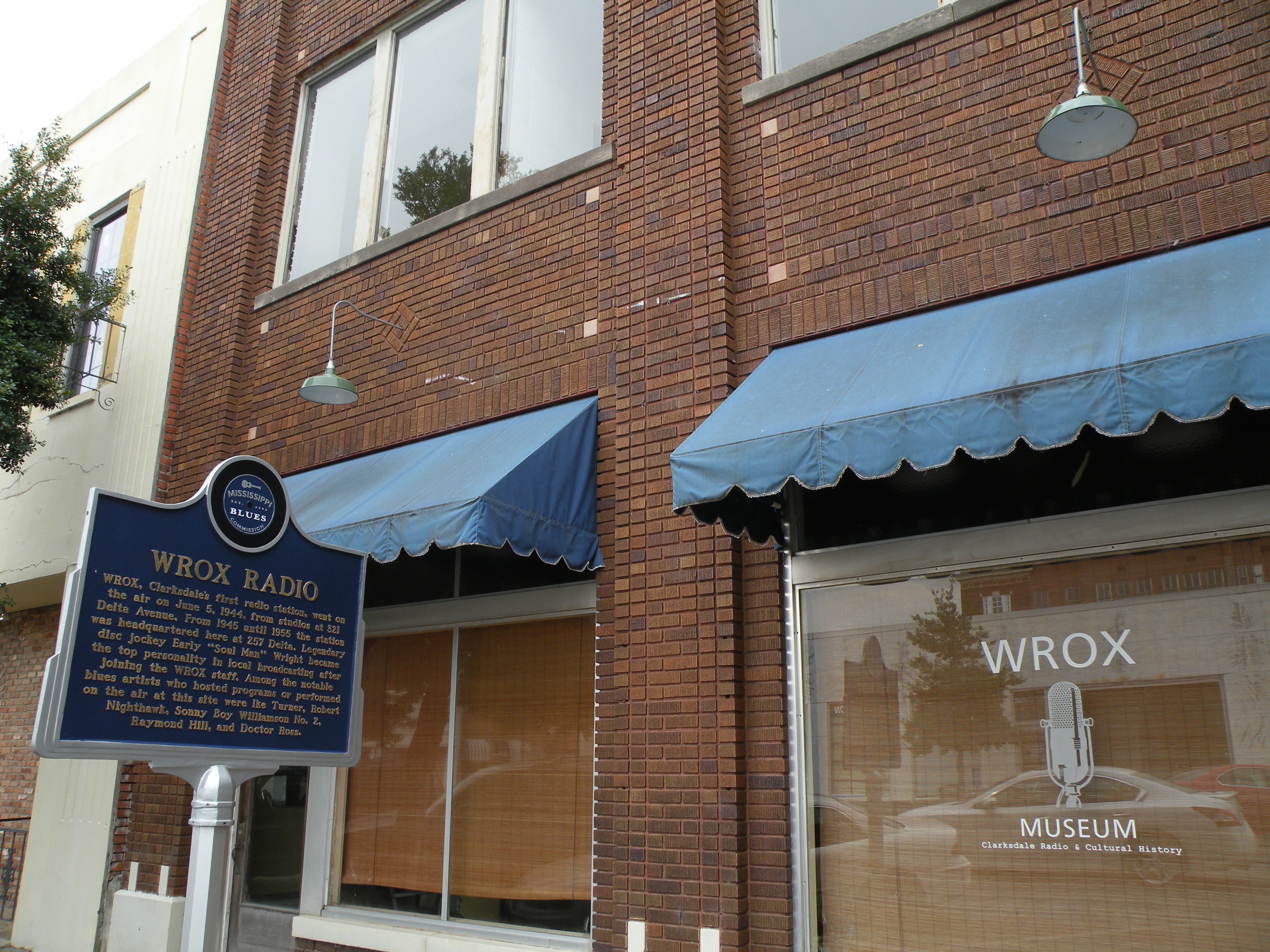
- Original WROX (AM) building in Clarksdale

- Location within the U.S. state of Mississippi
- Coordinates: 34°14′N 90°36′W
- Country: United States
- State: Mississippi
- Founded: February 9, 1836
- Seat: Clarksdale
- Largest city: Clarksdale

Area
  - Total: 583 sq mi (1,510 km^{2})
  - Land: 552 sq mi (1,430 km^{2})
  - Water: 31 sq mi (80 km^{2}) 5.3%

Population (2020)
  - Total: 21,390
  - Estimate (2025): 19,849 ▼
  - Density: 38.8/sq mi (15.0/km^{2})
- Time zone: UTC−6 (Central)
  - Summer (DST): UTC−5 (CDT)
- Congressional district: 2nd
- Website: www.coahomacounty.net

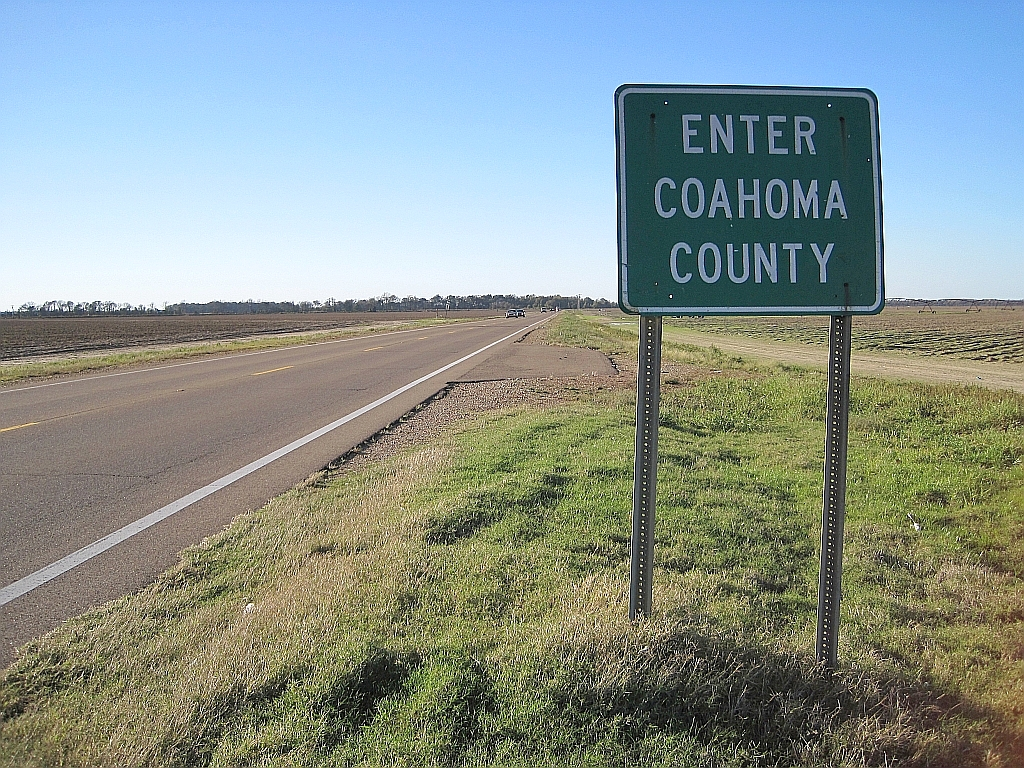

Coahoma County is a county located in the U.S. state of Mississippi. As of the 2020 census, the population was 21,390. Its county seat is Clarksdale. The Clarksdale, MS Micropolitan Statistical Area includes all of Coahoma County. It is located in the Mississippi Delta region of Mississippi. In 2023, the Clarksdale, Mississippi Micropolitan area was added to form the new Memphis-Clarksdale-Forrest City Combined Statistical Area. The Memphis-Clarksdale-Forrest City Combined Statistical Area has a population of roughly 1.4 million.

== History ==
Coahoma County was established February 9, 1836, and is located in the northwestern part of the state in the fertile Yazoo Delta region. The name "Coahoma" is a Choctaw word meaning "red panther." Chickasaw leader Coahoma is the immediate namesake of the county, he was chief of one of four annuity districts arranged by U.S. Indian agents in 1815; Coahoma's territory was in the northwestern section of what is now Mississippi.

The act creating the county defined its limits as follows:

Beginning at the point where the line between townships 24 and 25 of the surveys of the late Choctaw cession intersects the Mississippi River, and running thence up the said river to the point where the dividing line between the Choctaw and Chickasaw tribes of Indians intersects the same; thence with the dividing line to the point where the line between ranges two and three of the survey of the said Choctaw cession intersects the same; thence with said range line, to the line between townships 24 and 25 aforesaid, and thence with the said township line to the beginning.

In the early days of the county, before the construction of railways or extensive roadways inland, the Mississippi River was the primary transportation route, and the first three county seats were each located on the river. In 1836, Port Royal was designated as the first county seat. In 1841, high waters on the Mississippi River flooded Port Royal, and in 1842 the county seat was moved to the town of Delta. High waters on the Mississippi also flooded Delta, and in 1850 the county seat was moved to Friars Point, which had a population of about 1,000 in 1920, and received its name in honor of Robert Friar, an early settler. As nearby Clarksdale grew in population and influence, it challenged Friars Point's hold on the county government, and in 1892, Coahoma County was divided into two jurisdictions, one going to Friars Point and the other to Clarksdale. In 1930, the county seat was given exclusively to Clarksdale, which had a population of 7,500 in 1920. Clarksdale is now the largest and most important city in the county, and was named for John Clark, a brother-in-law of Governor James L. Alcorn, whose home, Eagle's Nest, was in this county.

== Geography ==
According to the U.S. Census Bureau, the county has a total area of 583 square miles (1,510 km^{2}), of which 552 square miles (1,430 km^{2}) is land and 31 square miles (80 km^{2}) (5.3%) is water.

=== Major highways ===
- Future Interstate 69
- U.S. Highway 49
- U.S. Highway 61
- U.S. Highway 278
- Mississippi Highway 1
- Mississippi Highway 6
- Mississippi Highway 315

=== Adjacent counties ===
- Tunica County (north)
- Quitman County (east)
- Sunflower County (south)
- Tallahatchie County (southeast)
- Bolivar County (southwest)
- Phillips County, Arkansas (west)

== Demographics ==
Historical population
Census	Pop.	Note	%±
1840	1,290		—
1850	2,780		115.5%
1860	6,606		137.6%
1870	7,144		8.1%
1880	13,568		89.9%
1890	18,342		35.2%
1900	26,293		43.3%
1910	34,217		30.1%
1920	41,511		21.3%
1930	46,327		11.6%
1940	48,333		4.3%
1950	49,361		2.1%
1960	46,212		−6.4%
1970	40,447		−12.5%
1980	36,918		−8.7%
1990	31,665		−14.2%
2000	30,622		−3.3%
2010	26,151		−14.6%
2020	21,390		−18.2%
2025 (est.)	19,849	▼	−7.2%
U.S. Decennial Census; 1790–1960 1900–1990; 1990–2000 2010–2013

=== 2020 census ===
Coahoma County, Mississippi – Racial and ethnic composition Note: the US Census treats Hispanic/Latino as an ethnic category. This table excludes Latinos from the racial categories and assigns them to a separate category. Hispanics/Latinos may be of any race.
Race / Ethnicity (NH = Non-Hispanic)	Pop 1980	Pop 1990	Pop 2000	Pop 2010	Pop 2020	% 1980	% 1990	% 2000	% 2010	% 2020
White alone (NH)	13,016	10,933	8,898	5,918	4,285	35.26%	34.53%	29.06%	22.63%	20.03%
Black or African American alone (NH)	23,306	20,335	21,099	19,698	16,209	63.13%	64.22%	68.90%	75.32%	75.78%
Native American or Alaska Native alone (NH)	13	18	26	20	26	0.04%	0.06%	0.08%	0.08%	0.12%
Asian alone (NH)	154	105	143	114	112	0.42%	0.33%	0.47%	0.44%	0.52%
Native Hawaiian or Pacific Islander alone (NH)	x	x	4	4	0	x	x	0.01%	0.02%	0.00%
Other race alone (NH)	2	3	4	7	44	0.01%	0.01%	0.01%	0.03%	0.21%
Mixed race or Multiracial (NH)	x	x	172	97	364	x	x	0.56%	0.37%	1.70%
Hispanic or Latino (any race)	427	271	276	293	350	1.16%	0.86%	0.90%	1.12%	1.64%
Total	36,918	31,665	30,622	26,151	21,390	100.00%	100.00%	100.00%	100.00%	100.00%

=== 2020 census ===
As of the 2020 census, the county had a population of 21,390. The median age was 37.4 years. 25.6% of residents were under the age of 18 and 16.8% of residents were 65 years of age or older. For every 100 females there were 86.3 males, and for every 100 females age 18 and over there were 82.1 males age 18 and over.

The racial makeup of the county was 20.2% White, 76.1% Black or African American, 0.1% American Indian and Alaska Native, 0.5% Asian, <0.1% Native Hawaiian and Pacific Islander, 1.0% from some other race, and 2.0% from two or more races. Hispanic or Latino residents of any race comprised 1.6% of the population.

67.4% of residents lived in urban areas, while 32.6% lived in rural areas.

There were 8,452 households in the county, of which 32.4% had children under the age of 18 living in them. Of all households, 26.1% were married-couple households, 21.2% were households with a male householder and no spouse or partner present, and 47.2% were households with a female householder and no spouse or partner present. About 34.2% of all households were made up of individuals and 14.0% had someone living alone who was 65 years of age or older.

There were 10,162 housing units, of which 16.8% were vacant. Among occupied housing units, 53.0% were owner-occupied and 47.0% were renter-occupied. The homeowner vacancy rate was 2.2% and the rental vacancy rate was 17.6%.

=== 2010 census ===
As of the 2010 United States census, there were 26,151 people living in the county. 75.5% were Black or African American, 22.9% White, 0.5% Asian, 0.1% Native American, 0.5% of some other race and 0.5% of two or more races. 1.1% were Hispanic or Latino (of any race).

=== 2000 census ===
As of the census of 2000, there were 30,622 people, 10,553 households, and 7,482 families living in the county. The population density was 55 people per square mile (21 people/km^{2}). There were 11,490 housing units at an average density of 21 units per square mile (8.1 units/km^{2}). The racial makeup of the county was 65.21% Black or African American, 27.28% White, 6.90% of the population were Hispanic or Latino, 0.47% Asian, 0.09% Native American, 0.02% Pacific Islander, 0.34% from other races, and 0.60% from two or more races. of any race.

There were 10,553 households, out of which 36.80% had children under the age of 18 living with them, 37.20% were married couples living together, 28.70% had a female householder with no husband present, and 29.10% were non-families. 26.20% of all households were made up of individuals, and 11.50% had someone living alone who was 65 years of age or older. The average household size was 2.83 and the average family size was 3.42.

In the county, the population was spread out, with 33.00% under the age of 18, 10.30% from 18 to 24, 25.30% from 25 to 44, 19.10% from 45 to 64, and 12.30% who were 65 years of age or older. The median age was 30 years. For every 100 females there were 84.90 males. For every 100 females age 18 and over, there were 77.50 males.

The median income for a household in the county was $22,338, and the median income for a family was $26,640. Males had a median income of $26,841 versus $19,611 for females. The per capita income for the county was $12,558. About 29.80% of families and 35.90% of the population were below the poverty line, including 45.90% of those under age 18 and 31.50% of those age 65 or over.

== Education ==
- College
  - Coahoma Community College (Clarksdale)

Coahoma County was previously in the service area of the Mississippi Delta Community College (MDCC). As a result of the 1995 Mississippi Legislature session, Coahoma County is no longer in the MDCC service area.

- Public School Districts
  - Clarksdale Municipal School District - Its high school is Clarksdale High School
  - Coahoma County School District - Its high school is Coahoma County Junior-Senior High School
- Private School
  - Lee Academy (Clarksdale)

Coahoma Early College High School closed in 2021.

== Communities ==
=== City ===
- Clarksdale (county seat)

=== Towns ===
- Coahoma
- Friars Point
- Jonestown
- Lula
- Lyon

=== Census-designated places ===
- Bobo
- Dublin
- Farrell
- Rena Lara

=== Unincorporated communities ===
- Burke Landing
- Claremont
- Clover Hill
- Hillhouse
- Hopson
- Humber
- Lu-Rand
- Mattson
- Moon Lake (community)
- Rich
- Roseacres
- Roundaway
- Rudyard
- Sherard
- Stovall
- Sunflower Landing

=== Ghost towns ===
- Delta
- Ingram (also in Quitman County)
- Port Royal
- Wildwood

== Notable people ==
- James L. Alcorn, United States Senator from Mississippi, owned and died at "Eagle Nest" in Coahoma County
- Thomas Harris, author of Hannibal Lecter novels; he was born in Jackson, Tennessee, but raised in Rich, Mississippi, an unincorporated community in Coahoma County.
- John Lee Hooker (1917–2001), blues musician born in 1917 in Coahoma County into a sharecropper and Baptist preacher family.
- D. H. Hopson (born 1859), a teacher, state legislator, tax assessor, and coroner in Mississippi
- Maud Jeffries (1869 – 1946), actress, born in Lula, Mississippi, married a wealthy Australian grazier, and settled in Australia.
- Ransom A. Myers (b. Lula, Mississippi, 1952 – d. Halifax, Nova Scotia, 2007) was a renowned Canada-based marine biologist, conservationist and scholar at Dalhousie University who published a seminal study on overfishing.
- Nate Dogg spent his childhood in Clarksdale.
- Rick Ross the rapper was born in Coahoma County in 1976. Soon moved to Miami-Dade County, Florida.
- Frederick Bruce Thomas (1872-1928), prominent entrepreneur and multi-millionaire in Moscow and Constantinople.
- Ike Turner, musician, was born in Clarksdale
- Tennessee Williams, playwright, spent much of his childhood in Clarksdale and Coahoma County. A Tennessee Williams Festival is held annually in Clarksdale.
- Blac Elvis was born in Clarksdale, Mississippi. Award-winning music producer/songwriter.
- Son House, blues singer and guitarist, (b. 1902 – d. 1988), was born at Lyon in Coahoma County, Mississippi.
- Conway Twitty, country singer, (b. 1933 - d. 1993), was born in Friars Point, Mississippi.

== Politics ==
Like the rest of the Mississippi Delta region, Coahoma County is a Democratic stronghold, having not supported a Republican presidential candidate since Richard Nixon in his 1972 landslide.

United States presidential election results for Coahoma County, Mississippi
Year	Republican		Democratic		Third party(ies)	
Year	No.	%	No.	%	No.	%
1912	16	3.64%	396	90.00%	28	6.36%
1916	21	2.91%	697	96.67%	3	0.42%
1920	61	6.40%	882	92.55%	10	1.05%
1924	121	8.16%	1,362	91.84%	0	0.00%
1928	223	11.14%	1,778	88.86%	0	0.00%
1932	62	3.57%	1,672	96.26%	3	0.17%
1936	49	2.32%	2,059	97.68%	0	0.00%
1940	137	5.32%	2,440	94.68%	0	0.00%
1944	191	7.39%	2,392	92.61%	0	0.00%
1948	113	4.87%	246	10.61%	1,960	84.52%
1952	1,619	43.36%	2,115	56.64%	0	0.00%
1956	1,082	32.80%	1,677	50.83%	540	16.37%
1960	1,096	28.34%	1,386	35.84%	1,385	35.82%
1964	4,172	81.23%	964	18.77%	0	0.00%
1968	1,875	17.20%	5,352	49.11%	3,671	33.69%
1972	6,602	61.56%	3,708	34.57%	415	3.87%
1976	4,269	38.41%	6,412	57.70%	432	3.89%
1980	4,592	38.22%	7,030	58.51%	393	3.27%
1984	5,759	44.96%	6,839	53.39%	212	1.65%
1988	4,939	43.79%	6,139	54.43%	200	1.77%
1992	4,120	36.85%	6,409	57.33%	651	5.82%
1996	3,441	35.80%	5,776	60.10%	394	4.10%
2000	3,695	38.68%	5,662	59.27%	196	2.05%
2004	3,676	34.65%	6,805	64.15%	127	1.20%
2008	2,917	27.60%	7,597	71.89%	54	0.51%
2012	2,712	25.71%	7,792	73.86%	45	0.43%
2016	2,426	27.22%	6,378	71.57%	108	1.21%
2020	2,375	27.94%	6,020	70.82%	106	1.25%
2024	2,008	29.57%	4,711	69.38%	71	1.05%

== See also ==
- National Register of Historic Places listings in Coahoma County, Mississippi
